= List of show business families =

This is a list of contemporary (20th- and 21st-century) show business families.

== Families ==
=== A ===
Adams-Beaver

- Actor Don Adams was the father of actress Cecily Adams. Cecily Adams was married to actor Jim Beaver. Adams' Get Smart series co-star Robert Karvelas was his cousin.

Aday

- Musician and part-time actor Michael Lee Aday (born Marvin Lee Aday), better known by his stage name of Meat Loaf, was the father of singer Pearl Aday and actress Amanda Aday.

Affleck

- Actor, director, writer and producer Ben Affleck was married to actress Jennifer Garner. He later married and divorced actress and singer Jennifer Lopez. His younger brother is fellow actor Casey Affleck, whose former wife is actress Summer Phoenix (see Phoenix siblings).

Alba/Warren

- Actress Jessica Alba is the daughter-in-law of actor Michael Warren. Her younger brother, Joshua Alba, is also an actor.

Alda

- Actor Robert Alda was the father of actor and director Alan Alda and actor Antony Alda.
  - Alan is married to photographer and writer Arlene Alda; their children include actresses Beatrice and Elizabeth Alda.

Aldridge

- Artist Alan Aldridge, with his first wife, is the father of photographer Miles Aldridge and model Saffron Aldridge. With his second wife, Playboy Playmate Laura Lyons, he is the father of models Lily and Ruby Aldridge.
  - Lily is married to the frontman of Kings of Leon, Caleb Followill (see Followill).
  - Miles was formerly married to model Kristen McMenamy.

Allen

- Actress Martha-Bryan Allen is sister of actress Elizabeth Bryan Allen, wife of actor Robert Montgomery (see Montgomery), by whom she had a daughter, actress Elizabeth Montgomery.

Allen

- Actor and director Kevin Allen is the older brother of actor and musician Keith Allen.
  - Keith was married to film producer Alison Owen, with whom he has two children, musician and actress Lily Allen and actor Alfie Allen. He has also been married to film producer Nira Park and has a daughter with actress Tamzin Malleson.
    - Lily is married to actor David Harbour.

Allen/Rashād

- Actress, director and singer Phylicia Rashad is the older sister of performer Debbie Allen, who is married to former NBA basketball player, Norm Nixon.
  - Phylicia Rashad is the former spouse of both Victor Willis, former lead singer of the group Village People, and former NFL football player turned sportscaster, Ahmad Rashad. Phylicia and Ahmad Rashad are the parents of actress Condola Rashad.

Allman

- Brothers Gregg Allman and Duane Allman made up the band The Allman Brothers Band, and Gregg later created The Gregg Allman Band (see also Trippy).
  - Gregg was once married to Cher (see Bono). With her he has musician son, Elijah Blue Allman. He also has son musician Devon Allman through a previous marriage. From another marriage he is also the father of Layla Allman, musician and lead singer of the band, Picture Me Broken.
    - Elijah is married to German musician Marieangela "Queenie" King, of the family pop band King, formed with her siblings (see King).

Alvarado-Page

- Mexican-American actor Don Alvarado was the father of actress Joy Page

Aniston-Theroux

- Actor John Aniston and actress Nancy Dow are the parents of Jennifer Aniston, who was married to actor Brad Pitt (see Pitt-Jolie) and also married to actor Justin Theroux (see Theroux).
  - His cousin is documentary filmmaker Louis Theroux.

Apatow

- Filmmaker Judd Apatow and actress Leslie Mann are the parents of actresses Maude Apatow and Iris Apatow.

Appleton

- Nicole Appleton and older sister Natalie perform together in All Saints and Appleton.

Arden-Osbourne

- Music manager and agent Don Arden was the father of Sharon Osbourne (see Osbourne), the wife and manager of heavy metal icon Ozzy Osbourne. Sharon entered the public consciousness for the first time with the success of the reality TV show The Osbournes.
  - The oldest of Ozzy and Sharon's children, Aimee Osbourne, chose not to appear on The Osbournes; she is an actress, singer, and writer. Her two younger siblings did appear on the show; Kelly is an actress and singer, and Jack is a director and producer.

Arkin

- Actor and composer Alan Arkin, father of actors Adam, Matthew, and Anthony Arkin.
  - Adam is the father of Molly Arkin.

Armendáriz-Marín

- Mexican actor Pedro Armendáriz and wife Carmelita, herself an actress, were the parents of fellow actor Pedro Armendáriz Jr. The father was a cousin of Mexican actress Gloria Marín.

Arnold-Jones

- Singer Monica is the cousin of record producer Polow da Don.

Arquette-Cox

- Actor, comedian, pianist and songwriter Cliff Arquette was the father of actor Lewis Arquette, who was the father of five actors:
  - Patricia Arquette, formerly married to actors Nicolas Cage and Thomas Jane.
  - Rosanna Arquette, formerly married to film composer James Newton Howard; she lived with, but never married, musician Peter Gabriel.
  - Alexis Arquette
  - David Arquette, who was married to actress Courteney Cox.

Asher

- Musician Peter Asher and actress Jane Asher are siblings. Peter is the father of musician Victoria Asher. (This family has no relation to actor William Asher below)

Asher-Bulifant

- William Asher, television actor, was born to stage actress Lillian Bonner and producer Ephraim M. Asher. His sister, Betty Asher, was an MGM publicist for Judy Garland. William was married to actress Danny Sue Nolan. Later he was married to actress Elizabeth Montgomery (see Montgomery) and they have daughter, Rebecca Asher, a film editor, and son and guitar maker, Bill Asher. Finally he married actress Joyce Bulifant (see Bulifant). He adopted Bulifant's son, actor John Asher, born to actor Edward Mallory (see Mallory).
  - John first married actress Vanessa Lee Asher. John later married actress Jenny McCarthy (see McCarthy).

Astin/Duke

- Actors and former spouses John Astin and Patty Duke are the parents of actors Sean and Mackenzie Astin.

Auberjonois

- Actor René Auberjonois is the father of actor Remy Auberjonois, who is married to actress Kate Nowlin.
  - His daughter Tessa, an actress, married Adrian LaTourelle, who voiced Unalaq in Book 2 The Legend of Korra.

=== B ===
Baio

- Actor-brothers Jimmy and Joey Baio are the cousins of actor-director Scott Baio.

Bacon

- Character Actor and Playwright Frank Bacon was the father of Actor Lloyd Bacon

Baker

- Actress Carroll Baker is the mother of Blanche Baker.

Balcon/Day-Lewis

- Film producer Sir Michael Balcon was the father of actress Jill Balcon who was married to poet and writer Cecil Day-Lewis. They are parents of documentary maker and television chef Tamasin Day-Lewis and actor Daniel Day-Lewis.
  - Daniel is married to director Rebecca Miller, daughter of playwright Arthur Miller.

Baldwin

- Brothers and actors Alec Baldwin, William Baldwin, Stephen Baldwin and Daniel Baldwin
  - Alec was married to actress Kim Basinger. Together they are the parents of model Ireland Baldwin.
  - William is currently married to singer Chynna Phillips (see Phillips).
  - Stephen is the father of model Hailey Baldwin who is married to Justin Bieber.

Note: Actor Adam Baldwin is not related to the preceding Baldwins.

Ball

- Presenter Johnny Ball is the father of broadcaster Zoe Ball.
  - Zoe is separated from her husband Norman Cook, better known as Fatboy Slim. The couple have two children.

Ball-Arnaz-Luckinbill

- Actress Lucille Ball and her first husband, musician and actor Desi Arnaz, are the parents of actors Lucie Arnaz and Desi Arnaz Jr. Lucille Ball later married comedian Gary Morton.
  - Lucie is married to actor Laurence Luckinbill. Luckinbill was previously married to actress Robin Strasser.
  - Desi Jr. was married to actress Linda Purl.

Banai

- Yossi, Gavri, Ya'akov and Chaim Banai were Israeli brothers who were all singers and actors.
  - Among Ya'akov's children was singer-songwriter Ehud Banai.
  - Among Yossi's children was Yuval Banai, lead singer of rock band Mashina. Yuval was formerly married to singer and actress Orly Silbersatz Banai.
    - One of Yuval and Orly's children is singer and musician Elisha Banai.
  - Another brother, Yitzhak, a judge, had among his children singer-songwriters Meir and Eviatar Banai, and actress Orna Banai.

Banquells-Pinal-Pasquel-Alatriste-Guzman-Salas

- Actress and producer Silvia Pinal was married first to actor Rafael Banquells, and then to actor and producer Gustavo Alatriste, and later to actor and singer Enrique Guzman.
  - Pinal and Banquells gave birth to actress Silvia Pasquel. Pasquel's younger sister by means of her father's remarriage is actress and singer Rocio Banquells. Pinal and Alatriste were the parents of actress Viridiana Alatriste, and Pinal and Guzman gave birth to Luis Enrique Guzman and singer Alejandra Guzman.
    - Actress Stephanie Salas is the daughter of Silvia Pasquel.

Bannon-Benaderet

- Actor Jim Bannon and actress Bea Benaderet were the parents of actor Jack Bannon, who is married to retired actress Ellen Travolta, older sister of actor John Travolta.

Bardem-Cruz

- Actors Rafael Bardem and Matilde Muñoz Sampedro were the parents of actress Pilar Bardem and screenwriter and director Juan Antonio Bardem.
  - Pilar is the mother of actors Carlos, Mónica and Javier Bardem.
    - Javier is married to actress Penélope Cruz, whose sister is actress Mónica Cruz.

Barry

- Actor Raymond J. Barry was the son of actress B. Constance Barry (born Beatrice Constance Duffy).

Barrymore-Costello

- 19th century stage actors Maurice Barrymore and Georgiana Drew were the parents of actors Lionel, Ethel and John Barrymore.
  - John was the father of actor John Drew Barrymore by his third wife, actress Dolores Costello, and actress Diana Barrymore by his second wife, actress Blanche Oelrichs.
    - Actor John Drew Barrymore first married actress Cara Williams. From his subsequent marriage to actress and manager Jaid Barrymore (née Ildiko Jaid Mako), he was the father of actress Drew Barrymore. Drew was briefly married to MTV host and comedian Tom Green. His last marriage was to actress Nina Wayne.
  - Lionel married silent film actresses Irene Fenwick and Doris Rankin.
  - Diana married actors Bramwell Fletcher and Robert Wilcox.

Basehart

- Actor Richard Basehart was the father of actor Jackie Basehart.

Bateman-Anka

- Producer Kent Bateman is the father of actors Jason and Justine Bateman.
  - Jason is married to actress Amanda Anka, daughter of singer Paul Anka.

Beatty-MacLaine-Bening

- Warren Beatty, brother of Shirley MacLaine and husband of Annette Bening.
  - Shirley is the mother of actress Sachi Parker.

Beery

- Actors Wallace, Noah, and William Beery are brothers.
  - Noah's son Noah Beery Jr. became a film and television star.
  - Wallace was married to actress Gloria Swanson.
    - Gloria's daughter from another marriage, Gloria Swanson Somborn, is also an actress.

Begley

- Academy Award-winning actor Ed Begley's son is actor and environmental activist Ed Begley Jr.

Bellisario

- Producer and screenwriter Donald P. Bellisario was married four times. His children include:
  - Television producers David and Julie Bellisario Watson by his first wife, Margaret Schaffran.
  - Actor Michael Bellisario by his second wife, Lynn Halpern.
  - Actress Troian Bellisario by his third wife, actress and producer Deborah Pratt. Troian is married to actor Patrick J. Adams.
  - Two stepsons – actor Sean Murray and producer Chad W. Murray, from the first marriage of his current wife, Vivienne.

Bergen

- Ventriloquist Edgar Bergen and his wife, model and actress Frances Bergen (née Westerman), are the parents of actress Candice Bergen.
  - Candice was married to French director Louis Malle.

Berggren

- Musician Jonas Berggren and his younger sisters, Malin (better known as Linn) and Jenny, are founding members of Ace of Base.
  - Jenny married musician Jakob Petrén.

Besson/Thalbach/Brasch/Kuttner/Serreau

- Director Benno Besson was in a relationship with actress Sabine Thalbach
  - their daughter is actress Katharina Thalbach, who was married to actor Vladimir Weigl (second grade nephew of actress Helene Weigel, wife of writer Berthold Brecht)
    - their daugter is actress Anna Thalbach
      - her daugter is actress Nellie Thalbach
    - Katharina later was in a relationship with writer Thomas Brasch, son of politician Horst Brasch and journalist Gerda Wenger-Brasch, brother of actor Klaus Brasch, writer Peter Brasch and radio host, journalist and writer Marion Brasch
      - Marion Brasch is with radio journalist Jürgen Kuttner mother to author and director Lena Brasch
        - television presenter, author, and podcaster Sarah Kuttner is her half sibling, from a former relationship of Jürgen Kuttner
- Besson was married to actress Ursula Karusseit
  - their son is actor Pierre Besson
    - he was in a relationship with actress Muriel Baumeister, one daughter
  - daughter from a realtionship of Besson with writer/director Coline Serreau (daughter of writer Geneviève Serreau and director Jean-Marie Serreau) is composer, singer and actress Madeleine Besson
  - another son of Benno Besson is director Philippe Besson

Bettany

- Actor, dancer, and drama teacher Thane Bettany is the father of actor Paul Bettany.
  - Paul married actress Jennifer Connelly.

Bilson

- Director and producer George Bilson is the father of Bruce Bilson, also a director, and acclaimed fortepianist Malcolm Bilson with his wife, screenwriter Hattie Bilson.
  - Bruce is the father of writer, director and producer Danny Bilson and film producer Julie Ahlberg. He also married actress Renne Jarrett.
    - Danny is the father of actress Rachel Bilson, from his first marriage. He also married actress Heather Medway.
    - Renne previously married actor Jack Stauffer (see Stauffer).
      - Rachel married actor Hayden Christensen.

Blandon

- Roberto Blandon, his second wife Rebeca Mankita, and daughter Regina Blandon are actors.

Blocker

- Actor Dan Blocker is the father of actor Dirk Blocker and producer David Blocker.

Bono

- Actor, singer, producer, and politician Sonny Bono was married to singer, director, producer, and actress Cher; they are the parents of actor and activist Chaz Bono.

Booth

- Actor Junius Brutus Booth was the father of actor Junius Brutus Booth Jr., actor Sydney Barton Booth, actor-producer Edwin Booth, actor John Wilkes Booth and writer Asia Booth.
  - Junius Jr. was married to actress Agnes Booth.
  - Asia Booth was married to actor-comedian and manager John Sleeper Clarke, and their sons were actors Creston and Wilfred Clarke.

Booth

- Actor Antony Booth married four times and fathered eight children. He is the father of Cherie Booth, a King's Counsel, with his first wife, actress Gale Howard (née Joyce Smith). With another partner, he is the father of Lauren Booth, an English broadcaster and journalist. The second of his four wives was the actress Pat Phoenix.
  - Pat was first married to actor Peter Marsh, and later married actor Alan Browning until his death.

Booth families are unrelated.

Boreanaz (Roberts)

- Broadcaster and presenter Dave Roberts (née David Thomas Boreanaz) is the father of actor David Boreanaz, who is married to former Playmate and actress Jaime Bergman.

Bracco

- Sisters Elizabeth and Lorraine Bracco are actresses.

Braga

- Brazilian Actress Alice Braga is daughter to Ana Braga and niece to Sônia Braga.

Bridges

- Actor Lloyd Bridges and his actress wife Dorothy (née Simpson) were the parents of actors Jeff and Beau Bridges.
  - Beau is father of actor Jordan Bridges.

Bridgewater/Moses

- Singer Dee Dee Bridgewater and former husband director Gilbert Moses are the parents of singer China Moses.

Brando

Actor Marlon Brando was the father of Christian Devi Brando and Cheyenne Brando.

Britton

- Actor Tony Britton was the father of presenter Fern Britton.

Broadus-Norwood

- Rapper Snoop Dogg is the first cousin of singers Brandy and Ray J, who are the children of gospel singer Willie Norwood, and of professional wrestler and actress Sasha Banks.

Broderick

- Actor Matthew Broderick is the son of actor James Broderick. Matthew is married to actress Sarah Jessica Parker.

Brolin

- see Streisand-Gould-Brolin.

Bronson

- Actor Charles Bronson was the father of Katrina Holden Bronson. Her mother was Jill Ireland, ex-wife of David McCallum.

Brooks-Bancroft

- Hollywood comedian-director Mel Brooks married actress Anne Bancroft.

Brosnan-Harris

- Actor Pierce Brosnan first wife was actress Cassandra Harris. Together, they were parents of actor Sean Brosnan.
  - Cassandra's first husband was Dermot Harris (a younger brother of Irish actor Richard Harris), with whom she had two children: Chris Brosnan and late Charlotte. After Harris' death, both were adopted by Brosnan.

Bulifant

- Actress Joyce Bulifant was married first to actor James MacArthur (see MacArthur), then to actor Edward Mallory, then to actor William Asher (see Asher-Bulifant), and finally to actor Roger Perry. She is the mother of actor John Mallory Asher (biological son of Edward Mallory).
  - Perry was once married to actress Jo Anne Worley for many years.
  - Mallory later married actress Susanne Zenor.

Burnett-Hamilton

- Actress and comedian Carol Burnett and her one-time husband, TV producer Joe Hamilton, are the parents of recording artist Erin Hamilton and actress Carrie Hamilton.

Busey

- Gary Busey is the father of Jake Busey. (Their legal names are William Gareth Jacob Busey Sr. and William Gareth Jacob Busey Jr., respectively.)

Butterworth

- Actor and comedian Peter Butterworth was married to the actress and impressionist Janet Brown. Peter and Janet were the parents of actor Tyler Butterworth; Tyler is married to actress Janet Dibley.

=== C ===
Caan

- Actor James Caan is the father of actor Scott Caan.

Cameron

- Actors Kirk and Candace Cameron are brother and sister. Kirk's wife is actress Chelsea Noble.

Capra

- Film director Frank Capra was the father of movie studio executive Frank Capra Jr.
  - Frank Jr. was in turn father to film director Frank Capra III.

Carey-Baskauskas

- Actor Macdonald Carey was the father of singer and actress Lynn Carey.
  - Another daughter, Theresa, is the mother of reality television personality Aras Baskauskas.

Carradine/Bowen/Plimpton

- Actor John Carradine was the father of four actors. Bruce Carradine, whom John adopted, was the son of his first wife Ardanelle McCool from a previous marriage, and David Carradine was his son by Ardanelle. Keith and Robert Carradine are John's sons from his second marriage to Sonia Sorel. She later had a son by artist Michael Bowen; their son is actor Michael Bowen.
  - Keith is the father of actress Martha Plimpton from a relationship with actress Shelley Plimpton.
  - Robert is the father of actress Ever Carradine.

Carpio

- Singer Teresa Carpio is the mother of actress and singer T.V. Carpio.

Carter-Cash

- The original Carter Family, a seminal country music group, consisted of A. P. Carter, his wife, Sara Carter, and his sister-in-law and Sara's cousin, Maybelle Carter.
  - Two of A. P. and Sara's children, Joe Carter and Janette Carter, followed in their parents' footsteps.
  - Maybelle had three daughters who entered the country music business, and performed with her for a time—Anita Carter, June Carter Cash, and Helen Carter.
    - June and her first husband, country singer Carl Smith, were the parents of country singer Carlene Carter. Carlene was married to singer-songwriter-producer Nick Lowe from 1979 to 1990.
    - June was the mother of country singer-songwriter Rosie Nix Adams by her second husband, Edwin "Rip" Nix.
    - June's third husband was singer Johnny Cash. They were the parents of singer, songwriter, and producer John Carter Cash.
    - Johnny was the father of country singer Rosanne Cash from his first marriage to Vivian Liberto. Rosanne was married to country superstar Rodney Crowell from 1979 to 1992. She then married musician John Leventhal.

Casadesus

- Patriarch Luis Casadesus and matriarch Mathilde Senechal began the prominent French family. They are the parents of composer Francis Casadesus, .
  - Francis is the father of pianist Rose Casadesus.
    - Rose is the mother of violist Henri Casadesus, violinist Marius Casadesus, and composer Robert-Guillaume Casadesus (known as Robert Casa).
      - Henri is the father of actor Christian Casadesus and actress Gisèle Casadesus with harpist Marie-Louise Beetz.
        - Gisèle married the actor Lucien Pascal (born Lucien Probst), with whom she had four children: conductor Jean-Claude Casadesus, actress Martine Pascal, artist Béatrice Casadesus, and composer Dominique Probst.
          - Jean-Claude has a daughter, opera singer Caroline Casadesus, and a son, film director Sebastian Copeland, with his first wife. With his second wife, he has a son, actor Olivier Casadesus.
            - Caroline was married to the violinist and composer Didier Lockwood. They are the parents of violinist and composer Thomas Enhco.
              - Didier is now married to opera singer Patricia Petibon. She was previously married to composer Eric Tanguy.
            - Sebastian was married to model and actress Brigitte Nielsen. He is also the cousin of actor Orlando Bloom.
              - Nielsen has been married five times. She was first married to composer Kasper Winding (see Winding). Their son is television personality, Julian Winding. She has also been married to actor Sylvester Stallone (see Stallone), television writer Raoul Meyer and producer Mattia Dessi.
              - Orlando was married to supermodel Miranda Kerr.
          - Martine was married to art director Willy Holt.
      - Robert-Guillaume is the father of the classical pianist Robert Casadesus.
        - Robert married pianist Gaby Casadesus. They have son and pianist, Jean Casadesus.
          - Jean married Evie Girard (see Girard).

Cassavetes

- Actress Katherine Cassavetes was the mother of director John Cassavetes.
  - John and his wife, actress Gena Rowlands, were parents to filmmakers Nick Cassavetes director of The Notebook, Zoe Cassavetes director of Broken English, and Alexandra Cassavetes.

Cassidy-Jones

- Actor Jack Cassidy was the father of singer and actor David Cassidy by his first wife, actress Evelyn Ward. He and his second wife, singer and actress Shirley Jones, had three sons—singer and actor Shaun Cassidy, and actors Patrick and Ryan Cassidy.
  - David's first wife was actress Kay Lenz. He is the father of actress and singer Katie Cassidy from a relationship with model Sherry Benedon.
  - Shaun was married to model Ann Pennington and actress Susan Diol. His current wife is producer Tracey Turner.

Chambers

- Singer Lester Chambers is the brother of Willie, George and Joe Chambers and like them a former member of 1960s group The Chambers Brothers.

Chan

- Actor Jaycee is the son of actors Joan Lin and Jackie Chan (a famous martial artist).

Chaney

- Lon Chaney Sr. is the father of actor Lon Chaney Jr.

Chapin

- Jazz drummer Jim Chapin is the father of musicians Harry, Tom, and Steve Chapin.
  - Harry was the father of singer Jen Chapin.
  - Tom is the father of Abigail and Lily Chapin, two-thirds of the Chapin Sisters folk music group. He is the stepfather of the third member, Jessica Craven, daughter of film director Wes Craven.

Chaplin

- Comedian Charlie Chaplin was the half-brother of actor Sydney Chaplin
  - Charlie was the father of actors Charles Jr., Sydney, Geraldine, Michael, Josephine, Victoria, Eugene, and Christopher
    - His granddaughter is actress Oona Chaplin.

Chong

- Actor-comedian Tommy Chong is the father of fellow actors Marcus, Robbi and Rae Dawn Chong.

Cheng

- Actress Joyce Cheng is the daughter of actors Adam Cheng and Lydia Shum.

Chuckle-Patton

- Paul and Barry Chuckle, known as the Chuckle Brothers, and their elder brothers, The Patton Brothers, are the son of James Patton Elliott, a Gang Show performer known as Gene Patton. The brothers appear together on ChuckleVision.

Cleese

- Comedian, actor and screenwriter John Cleese was married to Connie Booth and their daughter is actress Cynthia Cleese, who is married to producer and director Ed Solomon.

Clooney-Ferrer-Boone

- News anchor and politician Nick Clooney is the father of actor, producer and director George Clooney; George was married to actress Talia Balsam, daughter of Joyce Van Patten and Martin Balsam.
- Nick Clooney's sisters were Elizabeth ("Betty") Clooney and actress and singer Rosemary Clooney. Rosemary Clooney was married to actor José Ferrer, who in turn was previously married to actress and acting teacher Uta Hagen. Clooney and Ferrer were the parents of actor Miguel Ferrer and Gabriel Ferrer.
  - Gabriel married singer and actress Debby Boone; their twin daughters are Dustin and Gabi.
  - Debby is a member of the singing Boone Sisters, cousins of actor Randy Boone and the daughters of singer Pat Boone.

Note: Actor Mel Ferrer is unrelated to this family.

Clunes

- Actor and producer Alec Clunes was the father of actor Martin Clunes.
  - Martin's second wife is producer Phillipa Braithwaite.

Coen-McDormand

- Director and producer brothers Ethan and Joel Coen; Joel is married to Oscar-winning actress Frances McDormand.

Cole

- The brothers Nat King Cole, Ike Cole and Freddy Cole were all jazz singers and pianists.
  - Nat King Cole was the father of singer-songwriter Natalie Cole.
  - Freddy Cole is the father of musician and songwriter Lionel Cole.

Collier

American actor William Collier Sr. was the adopted father of William Collier Jr.

Compton-Pelissier-Reed

- Actress Fay Compton (whose brother was the writer Sir Compton Mackenzie) married the producer H. G. Pelissier; their son was producer and director Anthony Pelissier who married actor Penelope Dudley-Ward; their daughter being actor Tracy Reed who adopted the surname Reed following her mother's second marriage – to film director Sir Carol Reed, Tracy married actor Edward Fox (see Fox acting family below).

Connery

- Actor Sean Connery, whose first wife was Australian actress Diane Cilento; brother of actor Neil Connery.
  - Sean's son is actor Jason Connery, who was married to actress Mia Sara.

Conte

- Guitarist Bruce Conte of Tower of Power is the cousin of bassist Victor Conte.

Conti

- Actors Tom Conti and Kara Wilson are parents of actress and ventriloquist Nina Conti.

Contostavlos

- Mungo Jerry bassist Byron Contostavlos is the father of Dino "Dappy" Contostavlos and uncle of Tula "Tulisa" Contostavlos, both of N-Dubz.

Coppola-Shire-Schwartzman-Vogelsang-Cage

- Composers Anton Coppola and Carmine Coppola are brothers.
  - Carmine was the father of director Francis Ford Coppola and actress Talia Shire, as well as literature professor August Coppola.
    - Talia's first marriage was to composer David Shire. She is the widow of producer Jack Schwartzman. Shire and Schwartzman are the parents of actors and musicians Jason Schwartzman and Robert Carmine. Jack was the father of cinematographer John Schwartzman by an earlier marriage.
    - Francis and his wife, set decorator and artist Eleanor Neal Coppola, are the parents of film producer Gian-Carlo Coppola, director Roman Coppola, and film multihyphenate Sofia Coppola. Sofia was married to director Spike Jonze.
    - August and his former wife, dancer and choreographer Joy Vogelsang, are parents of actor and radio DJ Marc Coppola, director-producer Christopher Coppola, and actor Nicolas Coppola (Nicolas Cage). Nicolas was married to both actress Patricia Arquette (see Arquette-Cox) and singer Lisa Marie Presley (see Presley).

Corbett

- Harry Corbett, creator of the Sooty glove puppet and its TV shows, is the father of Matthew Corbett.

Coren

- Broadcaster, satirist and journalist Alan Coren is the father of Victoria Coren, who is married to comedian and actor David Mitchell.

Corfixen

- Cinematographer Teit Jørgensen and actress and editor Lizzie Corfixen are the parents of actress Liv Corfixen.
  - Liv is married to actor Nicolas Winding Refn (see Winding).

Corr

- Jim, Andrea, Caroline and Sharon Corr are members of the Irish-based folk group The Corrs

Costello

- Actor Maurice Costello and daughters Dolores Costello and Helene Costello. Great-granddaughter Drew Barrymore (granddaughter of Dolores).

Crosby-Edwards

- Singer-actor Bing Crosby was the father of: Gary; Dennis; Phillip; Harry; Lindsay; Mary and Nathaniel. Dennis was the father of actress Denise Crosby, who was married to Blake Edwards' son, Geoff. Geoff's sister is actress Jennifer Edwards.

Crosby-Raymond

- Oscar-winning cinematographer Floyd Crosby was the father of musician David Crosby (The Byrds, CSNY).
  - David is part of the jazz-rock band CPR with his biological son James Raymond.

Cruise-Mapother

- Actor Tom Cruise (born Thomas Cruise Mapother IV) is the cousin of actor William Mapother, and actress Amy Mapother, William's sister.
  - Tom has been married to actresses Mimi Rogers, Nicole Kidman (see Kidman) and Katie Holmes.

Cruttwell

- The son of theatre director Hugh Cruttwell and actress Geraldine McEwan is screenwriter and producer Greg Cruttwell.

Culkin

- Bonnie Bedelia is the sister of Kit Culkin, who is the father of actors Macaulay Culkin, Kieran Culkin, Dakota Culkin, Rory Culkin, Shane Culkin, Christian Culkin and Quinn Culkin. Macaulay was married to actress Rachel Miner.

Cumberbatch-Ventham

- Actors Timothy Carlton (full name Timothy Carlton Cumberbatch) and Wanda Ventham are the parents of actor Benedict Cumberbatch.

Curtis-Leigh-Guest

- Actors Tony Curtis and Janet Leigh were the parents of actresses Jamie Lee and Kelly Curtis; the girls' half-sister is actress Allegra Curtis.
  - Jamie Lee is married to comedian and actor Christopher Guest. His brother Nicholas Guest is also an actor, and their older half-brother Anthony Haden-Guest is a writer.

Cusack (Ireland)

- The actress Alice Violet Cole Cusack was the mother of actor Cyril Cusack.
  - Cyril is the father of six children, five of whom are actors. Niamh, Pádraig, Paul, Sorcha and Sinéad are his children with his first wife, actress Mary Margaret "Maureen" Kiely. His youngest daughter Catherine is his daughter by his second wife.
    - Niamh Cusack is married to actor Finbar Lynch.
    - Paul Cusack is a television producer.
    - Sinéad Cusack is married to the actor Jeremy Irons (see Irons). Their sons, Samuel and Max Irons, are also actors. Sinéad has another biological son, the politician Richard Boyd Barrett, who was given up for adoption.

Cusack (USA)

- Dick Cusack took to acting late in life. He is the father of actors, John, Joan, Ann, Bill and Susie Cusack.

Cyrus

- Politician Ron Cyrus is the father of singer and actor Billy Ray Cyrus.
  - Billy Ray was first married to songwriter, Cindy Smith. He is the father of singer and actress Miley Cyrus. Billy Ray's adopted son and Miley's half-brother, Trace Cyrus, is a member of pop band Metro Station. The youngest member of the family, Noah, is an actress.

=== D ===
d'Abo

- Actress Maryam d'Abo and singer-songwriter Mike d'Abo are first cousins. Among Mike's children is actress Olivia d'Abo.

Daly

- Actor James Daly was father of actress Tyne Daly and actor Tim Daly. Tyne was married to actor and director Georg Stanford Brown, and one of their daughters, Kathryne Dora Brown, is an actress. Tim was married to actress Amy Van Nostrand, their son Sam is an actor.

Daly

- Television presenter Tess Daly is married to fellow presenter Vernon Kay.

Davis (Robert)

- Comedian Jasper Carrott (born Robert Davis)is the father of actress Lucy Davis.
  - Lucy was previously married to Welsh actor Owain Yeoman.

Davis (Sammy)

- Vaudeville dancers, Sammy Davis Sr. and Elvera Sánchez, are the parents of entertainer, Sammy Davis Jr.
  - Sammy Davis Jr. was married to Swedish actress May Britt.

Davison–Dickinson–Moffett-Tennant

- English actor Peter Davison and his former wife, American actress Sandra Dickinson, are the parents of English actress Georgia Tennant (née Moffett).
  - Georgia's husband is actor David Tennant.
  - Actor Ty Tennant is Georgia's son and David's adoptive son.

Day-Lewis

- Poet and writer Cecil Day-Lewis and actress Jill Balcon are the parents of actor Daniel and Tamasin Day-Lewis, a documentary maker and television chef.
  - Daniel is married to director and screenwriter Rebecca Miller (see Miller).

DeGeneres

- Television host and comedian Ellen DeGeneres and actor Vance DeGeneres are siblings.
  - Ellen is married to actress and model Portia de Rossi.

del Toro

- Actor Benicio del Toro has a Puerto Rican cousin, basketball player Carlos Arroyo; and a Spanish cousin, pop-eurodance singer Rebeca Pous Del Toro. He has a daughter with model Kimberly Stewart (see Stewart).
  - Rebeca is the daughter of singer Franciska and painter José María Pous. She is the niece of Puerto Rican singer Eliseo Del Toro.

DeLuise

- Actor Dominick "Dom" DeLuise is the father of actors Peter, David, and Michael DeLuise.

De Laurentiis

- Motion picture-producer Dino De Laurentiis is the brother of fellow producer Luigi De Laurentiis, whose son (Dino's nephew) is fellow producer Aurelio De Laurentiis. Dino's son and daughters are fellow producers Federico, Francesca and Rafaella De Laurentiis. Dino's daughter, Veronica is an author and actress; Veronica's daughter, Dino's granddaughter, is Giada De Laurentiis, a celebrity chef, author, and television personality.

De Llano–Macedo

- Actors Luis de Llano Palmer and Rita Macedo were the parents of actress and singer Julissa and telenovela producer Luis de Llano Macedo. Julissa was married to musician Benny Ibarra.

de Mille

- Playwright Henry C. de Mille was the father of playwright film director William de Mille and film director Cecil B. DeMille. William was the father of dancer choreographer Agnes de Mille.

Demme

- Film director Jonathan Demme was the uncle of film director Ted Demme.

Dennehy

- Brian Dennehy is the father of actresses Elizabeth and Kathleen Dennehy.

Depardieu

- Gérard and Élisabeth Depardieu are the parents of actors Guillaume and Julie Depardieu.

Dern

- Actor Director Bruce Dern and actress Diane Ladd are the parents of actress Laura Dern

Deschanel

- Cinematographer Caleb Deschanel and his wife, actress Mary Jo Deschanel (née Weir), are the father and mother of actresses Zooey and Emily Deschanel.
  - Emily is married to actor David Hornsby
  - Zooey was married to indie rock musician Ben Gibbard

Dickens–Napier–Raine–Forster

- Author Charles Dickens was the great-great-great-grandfather of actors Harry Lloyd and Gerald Dickens. Dickens' great-granddaughter Aileen Dickens Hawksley, who went by Gypsy, was the wife of British actor Alan Napier. Alan's daughter, actress Jennifer Raine, was the mother of actor Brian Forster.

Dillon–Raymond

- Actors Matt and Kevin Dillon are the great-nephews of cartoonist Alex Raymond, who created Flash Gordon.

Disney

- Animation pioneer Walt Disney was brother of Roy O. Disney; the two founded The Walt Disney Company. Roy's son Roy E. Disney was once head of Walt Disney Feature Animation before resigning. They are cousins to voice artist Melissa Disney.

Dolenz–Johnson–Juste–Trimble

- Italian-born Slovenian film actor George Dolenz and his wife, stage actress and singer Janelle Johnson, were the parents of musician and actor Micky Dolenz, best known as a member of The Monkees.
  - Micky and his former wife, British model and TV presenter Samantha Juste, are the parents of actress Ami Dolenz, who is married to kickboxer-actor Jerry Trimble.

Dosamantes–Rubio

- Actress Susana Dosamantes and her husband, Enrique Rubio, have been the parents of actress and singer Paulina Rubio.

Dotrice

- Actor Roy Dotrice and late wife actress Kay Dotrice (née Newman) are the parents of actresses Karen and Michele Dotrice; Michele is the widow of actor Edward Woodward.

Douglas

- Actor Kirk Douglas is the father of actor Michael Douglas and producer Joel Douglas by his first wife, actress Diana (née Dill); and of producer Peter Douglas and comic and the late actor Eric Douglas by his second wife, actress Anne Buydens.
  - Michael is the father of actor Cameron Douglas by his first wife, Diandra Luker, and is currently married to actress Catherine Zeta-Jones.

Dragon–Tennille

- Composer Carmen Dragon is the father of composer and musician Daryl "the Captain" Dragon, partner and former husband of singer Toni Tennille.

Draper–Wolff–Mulligan

- Actress and writer Polly Draper was the star of ABC's television series Thirtysomething. She served as creator, executive producer, writer and director of Nickelodeon's The Naked Brothers Band TV show, starring her singer-songwriting musician sons Nat Wolff and Alex Wolff. Her husband and the siblings' father is jazz pianist and recording artist Michael Wolff, who was the bandleader for The Arsenio Hall Show. He was cast in the Nickelodeon series.
  - Actress Jesse Draper was a star on The Naked Brothers Band and is the producer and host of the web series The Valley Girl Show. She is the daughter of venture capitalist Tim Draper, a recurring star and consulting producer for The Naked Brothers Band. Her aunt is Polly Draper and her cousins are Nat and Alex Wolff.
  - Jesse Draper's brothers, Billy and Adam, are recurring stars on The Naked Brothers Band.
  - Coulter Mulligan, a recurring star on The Naked Brothers Band, is a nephew of Polly Draper, and cousin of Jesse, Billy and Adam Draper, and Nat and Alex Wolff.

Drucker

- The husband-and-wife classical clarinetists Stanley and Naomi Drucker are the parents of rockabilly double bassist Leon Drucker, better known as Lee Rocker, and alt-country singer-songwriter Rosanne Drucker.

Duclon–Johnson

- Actress Cherie Johnson, who starred on Punky Brewster, is the niece of that show's creator and producer David W. Duclon.

Dulfer

- Saxophonist Hans Dulfer is the father of fellow saxophonist Candy Dulfer.

Dunne–Didion

- Writer John Gregory Dunne was the husband of writer Joan Didion and brother of journalist Dominick Dunne; Dominick was the father of actor-director Griffin Dunne and actress Dominique Dunne.

Durcal–Morales

- Júnior Morales, Rocío Dúrcal and their daughter Shaila Dúrcal are singers.

Dussauge-Duval

- Actress Maria Duval is the aunt of actress-comedienne Consuelo Duval. They share the same birth surname, Dussauge.

Duvitski–Bentall

- Actress Janine Duvitski is the mother of actress Ruby Bentall.

Dylan

- Musician Bob Dylan and his first wife, former model Sara Dylan, are the parents of film director Jesse Dylan and musician Jakob Dylan. Jesse's wife Susan Traylor and Jakob's wife Paige Dylan are both actresses.

=== E ===
Eastwood

- Actor, composer, director and producer Clint Eastwood is the father of actress and director Alison Eastwood, actor and jazz musician Kyle Eastwood, and actor Scott Eastwood. Eastwood has one daughter with Frances Fisher, actress and model Francesca Fisher-Eastwood.

Ebsen

- Actor and dancer Buddy Ebsen, who performed with his sister, Vilma Ebsen, was the father of musician Kiki Ebsen.

Ecclestone

- Formula One billionaire Bernie Ecclestone and former Armani model Slavica Ecclestone are the parents of socialite and billionaire Petra Ecclestone. Their other daughter, Tamara Ecclestone, is also a model and socialite.
  - Petra is married to businessman James Stunt.

Edmondson

- Comedian, actor and singer Ade Edmondson and comedian and actress Jennifer Saunders are the parents of singer-songwriter Ella Edmondson.

Einstein

- Comedian Harry Parke (born Harry Einstein) and his wife and actress Thelma Leeds are the parents of actor and comedy writer Bob Einstein and entertainer Albert Brooks (born Albert Lawrence Einstein).

Eisley

- Actor Anthony Eisley was the father of singer and actor David Glen Eisley.
  - David is married to actress Olivia Hussey, and they are the parents of actress India Eisley.

Elfman

- Danny Elfman, musician and film composer, married to actress Bridget Fonda, his younger brother Eddie Elfman (see below, "Fonda acting family"); brother of film director Richard Elfman, Richard is father of actor Bodhi Elfman, who married actress Jenna Elfman; Jenna is niece of singer Tony Butala of The Lettermen.

Elliott

- Bob Elliott married Bob and Ray writer, Raymond Knight's widow, Lee. Their son is comedian, Chris Elliott.
  - Chris's daughter is comedian, Abby Elliott, who has sometimes performed with her younger sister, Bridey.

Elwes

- Producer Cassian Elwes and his brother, actor Cary Elwes.

Emmanuel

- Australian guitar master Tommy Emmanuel has a brother Phil Emmanuel who often plays with him on-stage.

Escovedo

- Musicians Pete, Coke, Alejandro, Mario (of The Dragons) and Javier Escovedo (of The Zeros) are all brothers.
  - Pete is the father of musicians Sheila E. and Peter Michael Escovedo.
    - Peter Michael is the biological father of designer and television personality Nicole Richie.

Estevez

- Actors Martin Sheen (born Ramón Estévez) and Joe Estevez are brothers. Martin is married to actress Janet Templeton.
  - Martin and Janet are the parents of four children, all actors: Charlie Sheen (born Carlos Estévez), Emilio Estevez, Ramon Estevez Jr., and Renée Estevez. Charlie was married to actress Denise Richards. Emilio was married to singer Paula Abdul.

=== F ===
Fabray/Fabares-Farrell

- Actress Nanette Fabray is the aunt of fellow actress Shelley Fabares (Fabares is the actual family name). Shelley is the wife of actor Mike Farrell.

Fairbanks

- Actor and producer Douglas Fairbanks married actress Mary Pickford; father of actor Douglas Fairbanks Jr. who was the first husband of actress Joan Crawford.

Fan

- Actor Louis Fan is the son of Fan Mei-Sheng, a martial arts actor of the 1970s.

Farnum

- Actor William Farnum and his brother Dustin were actors on stage and screen

Farrow-Previn-Allen

- Director John Farrow and actress Maureen O'Sullivan are the parents of actresses Mia and Tisa Farrow and film producer Prudence Farrow.
  - Mia was married to both Frank Sinatra and musician André Previn. After her divorce from Previn, she was in a long-term relationship with entertainment multihyphenate Woody Allen that ended when Allen became romantically involved with (and ultimately married) Soon-Yi Previn, Mia's adoptive daughter with Previn. With Allen, she also had a son, Ronan Farrow, an investigative journalist.

Fields

- Actress Chip Fields is the mother of actresses Kim, Jere and Alexis Fields.

Fields/Lander

- Bandleader Shep Fields was an elder brother of theatrical agent and film producer Freddie Fields who was married firstly to former child star Edith Fellows and secondly to actress Polly Bergen; by his first wife he is the father of actress Kathy Fields who is married to actor David Lander, they are the parents of actress and singer Natalie Lander.

Fiennes

- Photographer Mark Fiennes was married to novelist and painter Jennifer Lash had six children, among them actors Ralph and Joseph, film-makers Martha and Sophie and composer Magnus. Mark is part of the Twisleton-Wykeham-Fiennes family which includes his third cousin adventurer and writer Ranulph Fiennes.
  - Ralph was married to actress Alex Kingston and long-time partner of actress Francesca Annis.
  - Martha is married to director George Tiffin and their son is child actor Hero Fiennes-Tiffin.

Figueroa/Sebastian

- Joan Sebastian and his son José Manuel Figueroa (Figueroa is the actual family name) are singers, as is Sebastian's ex-wife, Maribel Guardia, who is also an actress.

Fisher-Reynolds-Taylor

- Singer Eddie Fisher married actress and singer Debbie Reynolds, by whom he fathered actress and writer Carrie Fisher and a son, producer Todd Fisher; he later married actress Elizabeth Taylor, and later still singer Connie Stevens, which produced actress Joely Fisher. Carrie Fisher had a daughter with talent agent Bryan Lourd, Billie Lourd, who is also an actress.

Fitzalan-Howard

- While the third one was not a show business figure, TV personality David Frost and actor Patrick Ryecart married daughters of Miles Fitzalan-Howard, 17th Duke of Norfolk, whose granddaughter is playwright Kinvara Balfour.

Fleeshman

- Actor David Fleeshman and actress Sue Jenkins are the parents of actors Richard, Emily and Rosie Fleeshman.

Fleischer

- Cartoonists Dave and Max Fleischer were brothers; Max's son was director Richard Fleischer.

Flowerton-Foch

- Actress Consuelo Flowerton was the mother of actress Nina Foch.

Flynn

- Actor Errol Flynn was the father of actor and journalist Sean Leslie Flynn and grandfather of actor Sean Flynn (born Sean Rio Amir) through his daughter, Rory Flynn.

Fogerty

- Musicians John and Tom Fogerty are brothers and members of Creedence Clearwater Revival.

Followill

- The alternative rock band Kings of Leon is made up of brothers Nathan, Caleb, and Jared Followill, alongside their first cousin Matthew Followill.
  - Nathan is married to singer-songwriter Jessie Baylin.
  - Caleb is married to model Lily Aldridge (see Aldridge).
  - Matthew is married to singer-songwriter Johanna Bennett. She was once the partner of Alex Turner of the band Arctic Monkeys.

Fonda

- Actor Henry Fonda was father of actress Jane Fonda and actor Peter Fonda.
  - Jane was married to director Roger Vadim, political activist Tom Hayden and media mogul Ted Turner; she and Hayden are parents of actor Troy Garity.
  - Peter is father of actress Bridget Fonda, who married musician Danny Elfman (see Elfman).

Ford

- Glenn Ford was married to Eleanor Powell (1943–1959), and was the father of actor Peter Ford.

Foulger-Ames

- Byron Foulger and his wife Dorothy Adams were the parents of actress Rachel Ames

Fox

- Theatrical agent Robin Fox married actress Angela Worthington, daughter of playwright Frederick Lonsdale. Their children were actors Edward and James Fox, and producer Robert Fox.
  - Edward was married to actress Tracy Reed, and later to actress Joanna David. Edward and Joanna are the parents of actors Emilia and Freddie Fox.
    - Emilia was married to actor Jared Harris, son of actor Richard Harris.
  - Robert was married to actress Natasha Richardson (see Redgrave).
  - James is the father of actors Laurence, Jack and Lydia Fox.
    - Laurence was married to actress Billie Piper.
    - Lydia is married to actor and comedian Richard Ayoade.

Foxworth

- Actor Robert Foxworth is the son of Erna Beth (née Seaman), a writer. Robert was married to Marilyn McCormick, who had a son, actor Bo Foxworth, and a daughter, actress Kristyn Foxworth. Robert was then married to actress Elizabeth Montgomery (see Montgomery).
  - Bo is married to actress Wendy Kaplan.

Foy

American actor Eddie Foy was the father of actors Charley Foy, Eddie Foy, Jr. and Producer and directer Bryan Foy

  - Eddie Foy, Jr. was the father Eddie Foy III

Furtwängler/Ackermann

- Archaeologist Adolf Furtwängler, son of philologist and teacher Wilhelm Furtwängler, was married to Adelheid Wendt, daughter of philologist Gustav Wendt, whose sister Mathilde Wendt was a well known pianist, and Anna Dohrn, daughter of entomologist Carl August Dohrn.
  - One son was conductor and composer Wilhelm Furtwängler; he married writer Elisabeth Albert, widowed Elisabeth Ackermann, daughter of politician Katharina von Kardorff-Oheimb and chemist and entrepreneur Heinrich Albert.
    - Their son Andreas Furtwängler is a well known archaeologist, too.
    - The daughter of the first marriage of Elisabeth Furtwängler was actress Kathrin Ackermann.
    - The third grade nephew to Wilhelm Furtwängler was physician and translator Hubert Furtwängler; he was married to pianist, painter and translator Margarete Furtwängler-Knittel, who was daughter of writer John Knittel and sister-in-law of Luise Rainer.
  - Another son, mountaineer Walter Furtwängler, is father to director Florian Furtwängler and architect Bernhard Furtwängler.
      - Kathrin Ackermann was married to Bernhard Furtwängler; their daughter is actress and physician Maria Furtwängler.
        - Maria Furtwängler was married to publisher Hubert Burda; their daughter is entrepreneur and musician Elisabeth Furtwängler.
  - Daughter Märit Furtwängler was married to philosopher Max Scheler.
    - Their son Max Scheler was a photographer.

Francis-Frakes

- Actor and director Jonathan Frakes is married to soap opera star Genie Francis, who is the daughter of Ivor Francis.

Francks

- Actor and musician Don Francks and wife Lili Francks are the parents of actress Cree Summer and actor Rainbow Sun Francks.

Franklin

- Musician Aretha Franklin often recorded her music with her two sisters Erma Franklin and Carolyn Franklin, who were solo singers in their own right; brother Cecil Franklin was a singer as was their father, the Reverend C.L. Franklin.

Freud

- Late politician, broadcaster and writer Sir Clement Freud, grandson of Sigmund Freud, was married to director and actress June Flewett and had five children, including public relations executive Matthew and broadcaster and presenter Emma Freud. Sir Clement's niece, novelist and screenwriter Esther Freud, is married to actor David Morrissey.
  - Matthew was married to Elisabeth Murdoch, daughter of media magnate Rupert Murdoch.
  - Emma is the partner of screenwriter and producer Richard Curtis.

Frith

- Musicians Mishka and Heather Frith (aka Heather Nova) are brother and sister.

Froese

- Composer and musician Edgar Froese is the father of fellow performer Jerome Froese, who works with him as part of Tangerine Dream.

Frye-Peluce-Goldberg

- Actor Virgil Frye was the father of actors Sean Frye and Soleil Moon Frye (the latter married TV producer Jason Goldberg) and stepfather of actor Meeno Peluce, whose mother Sondra Peluce Londy is Sean and Soleil's mother.

=== G ===
Gaillard-Gaye

- Cuban jazz musician Slim Gaillard is the father of singer and actress Janis Hunter, later to be known as Janis Gaye upon her marriage to singer Marvin Gaye.
  - Before they married, Marvin and Janis became the parents of future singer and actress Nona Gaye.
  - Marvin has a musical brother in singer Frankie Gaye.

Gainsbourg

- French singer, songwriter, composer, actor and director Serge Gainsbourg was the father of English-French singer and actress Charlotte Gainsbourg.

Garcia

- Actor Andy García is the father of Dominik Garcia-Lorido, an actress. Both starred as father and daughter in City Island.

Garland-Minnelli

- Judy Garland (born Frances Ethel Gumm) married film director Vincente Minnelli as her second husband, and they were the parents of actress Liza Minnelli; Garland's third husband was producer Sidney Luft, and by him was mother of cabaret singer Lorna Luft.

Gastineau

- NFL football player Mark Gastineau was formerly married to reality star Lisa Gastineau. They are the parents of model and reality star Brittny Gastineau.

Gauguin

- Sculptor Paul Gauguin is the father of footballer Emil Gauguin, artist Jean Gauguin, and painter Pola Gauguin.
  - Jean's second wife was cartoonist Sys Poulsen. Their daughter is television writer and author Lulu Gauguin.
    - Lulu was married to jazz pianist Adrian Bentzon. With him, she is the mother of jazz musician Aske Bentzon. She is also the mother of singer Alberte Winding (see Winding) with actor Thomas Winding.
      - Alberte was married to musician Jan Rørdam. She is now married to musician Andreas Fuglebæk.
  - Pola is the father of painter Paul Rene Gauguin.
    - Paul's second wife was actress Bonne Winther-Hjelm Jelstrup.

Geldof-Yates

- Singer-songwriter Bob Geldof is the father of broadcaster, journalist and model Peaches Geldof and model Pixie Geldof by his ex-wife, music journalist and presenter Paula Yates, who subsequently was the partner of singer Michael Hutchence. Yates is the biological daughter of television host Hughie Green but was raised by presenter and producer Jess Yates and his wife actress Elaine Smith as their own.
  - Peaches was married to S.C.U.M lead singer Thomas Cohen. She was married to Chester French musician Max Drummey.

Gélin

- French actor Daniel Gélin married actress Danièle Delorme (born Gabrielle Danièle Marguerite Andrée Girard) (see Girard). They have a son, actor Xavier Gélin. Daniel had an affair with model Marie Christine Schneider, which produced a daughter, actress Maria Schneider. He also has a daughter, actress Fiona Gélin (born Bénédicte), from a later marriage.

George-De Mornay-O'Neal

- TV host Wally George was the father of actress Rebecca De Mornay, who is married to sportscaster Patrick O'Neal, son of actor Ryan O'Neal.

George-White

- Rat Patrol star Christopher George was the uncle of Wheel of Fortune co-hostess Vanna White and was the husband of actress- TV personality Linda Day- George.

Gibb

- The Bee Gees were brothers Barry, Robin and Maurice Gibb. Their younger brother Andy Gibb was a successful recording artist in his own right.
  - Barry's son Steve Gibb is a rock guitarist and singer.
  - Maurice was married to singer Lulu.

Gibbs-Garrett

- Marla Gibbs and Susie Garrett, both television actresses, were sisters.

Gilbert

- Actresses Melissa and Sara are sisters. Melissa was married to actor Bruce Boxleitner.

Girard

- Painter André Girard was the father of actress Danièle Delorme (born Gabrielle Danièle Marguerite Andrée Girard) and three other daughters.
  - Delorme married actor Daniel Gélin (see Gélin), with whom she had a son, actor Xavier Gélin. She then married actor and filmmaker Yves Robert (see Robert).
  - André's daughter, Evie, married pianist Jean Casadesus (see Casadesus).

Gish

- Actresses Lillian and Dorothy Gish were famous sisters in Hollywood's early days. Dorothy married actor James Rennie.

Gallagher

- Noel and younger brother Liam are members of rock band Oasis. Nicole Appleton and Patsy Kensit have had children by Liam.

Glass

- Composer Philip Glass's cousin Ira Glass is radio host and creator of This American Life.

Gleason-Miller

- Actor Jackie Gleason's daughter Linda married actor Jason Miller; their son, Jackie's grandson, is actor Jason Patric.

Gleeson

- Actor Brendan Gleeson is the father of actors Domnhall and Brian Gleeson.

Glenister

- Director John Glenister is the father of actors Philip Glenister and Robert Glenister.

Gold

- Actor-turned-talent agent Harry Gold is the father of actresses Tracey, Missy, Brandy and Jessie Gold.

Gold-Nixon

- Oscar-winning composer Ernest Gold and his first wife, singer Marni Nixon, are the parents of singer-songwriter and producer Andrew Gold.

Goldwyn (Howard-Goldwyn)

- Samuel Goldwyn's son, Samuel Goldwyn Jr., was married to Jennifer Howard (daughter of Sidney Howard). Sam Jr. and Jennifer's sons are actors John and Tony Goldwyn.

Gomez

- Producer Roberto Gomez Fernandez is the son of actor, comedian and director Roberto Gomez Bolanos and nephew of actor and producer Horacio Gomez Bolanos.

Gooding

- Singer Cuba Gooding is father of actors Cuba Gooding Jr. and Omar Gooding.

Gordy-Ross

- Music producer and Motown founder Berry Gordy is the younger brother of songwriter and composer Anna Gordy Gaye, the first wife of singer Marvin Gaye.
  - Gordy is the father of musician Kennedy Gordy (Rockwell), from a relationship with Margaret Norton, actress Rhonda Ross Kendrick from another relationship with singer Diana Ross, and rapper and musician Stefan Gordy (Redfoo) from a relationship with writer and producer Nancy Leiviska.
- Ross is the mother of actress Tracee Ellis Ross from her marriage to Robert Ellis Silberstein, and actor Evan Ross (see Ross).

Gould

- Actors Alexander, Emma and Kelly Gould are siblings.

Gray

- Beatrice Gray was the mother of Father Knows Best star (and motorcyclist) Billy Gray.

Griffin-Haid

- Actor Charles Haid and talk show-host and TV producer Merv Griffin are cousins.

Grimes

- Actress Camryn Grimes of The Young and the Restless is the niece of actor Scott Grimes.

Groves-Roper

- Victorian stage actor Charles Groves was a father to Fred Groves, a leading actor of British silent films, and a brother to Walter Groves of the Fred Karno Company. Henry Groves, a brother to Charles and Walter, is the great-grandfather of Linda Groves, who married the comedian George Roper. Roper himself was the great-nephew of the Music Hall comedians Johnnie Cullen and George Sanford and a first cousin once removed of the wartime singer Jeannie Bradbury. His son Matt Roper is an actor and comedian.

Gunn

- James Gunn, film director, screenwriter and novelist is brothers with actor Sean, screen and television writer Brian, political entertainer Matt, and film executive Patrick Gunn. They are cousins with television and screenwriter Mark Gunn. In 2000, James Gunn married actress Jenna Fischer; the couple later divorced.

Note the family is not related to television personality Tim Gunn

Guthrie-Irion

- Folk singer-songwriter Woody Guthrie was the father of fellow folk singer-songwriter Arlo Guthrie.
  - Arlo in turn is the father of singer-songwriter Sarah Lee Guthrie, who performs with her husband as Sarah Lee Guthrie & Johnny Irion.

Gwynne-Gilford-Pine

- Actress Anne Gwynne was the mother of Gwynne Gilford.
- Actress Gwynne Gilford married actor Robert Pine, and they are the parents of actor Chris Pine.

Gyllenhaal-Foner

- Actors Maggie Gyllenhaal and Jake Gyllenhaal are the children of director Stephen Gyllenhaal and writer Naomi Foner. Maggie is married to actor Peter Sarsgaard.

=== H ===
Hagen

- Scriptwriter Hans Hagen (also known as Hans Oliva), and actress Eva-Maria Hagen are the parents of punk rock singer Nina Hagen. Eva-Maria was later married to Wolf Biermann, a singer-songwriter.
  - Nina's daughter Cosma Shiva Hagen is an actress.

Hale

- Alan Hale Sr. married actress Gretchen Hartmann and they were the parents of Alan Hale Jr.

Hall

- Sir Peter Hall is a theatre and film director. His children are Emma Hall (from his fourth marriage to theatre publicist Nichola Frei); actress Rebecca (from his third marriage to opera singer Maria Ewing); director Edward and theatre designer Lucy Hall (both from his second marriage to his assistant Jacqueline Taylor); and producer Christopher and painter, actress and singer-songwriter Jennifer (both from his first marriage to actress Leslie Caron. Caron was previously married to musician Geordie Hormel and subsequently to American producer/director Michael Laughlin).
  - Edward is married to comedian Issy van Randwyck.
  - Jennifer is married to producer and screenwriter Glenn Wilhide.
  - Christopher is married to the Hon. Jane Studd, formerly a third assistant director, and their son Freddie Hall is a second assistant director, while his younger brother Ben Hall is training to become an actor.

Hallyday/Smet-Vartan-Scotti

- French singer and actor Jean-Philippe Smet, better known by his stage name of Johnny Hallyday, and his first wife, French singer Sylvie Vartan, are the parents of singer David Hallyday (born David Smet). Johnny is the father of actress Laura Smet from a later relationship with actress Nathalie Baye.
  - David was married to French supermodel Estelle Lefébure.
- Sylvie's current husband is American actor and music producer Tony Scotti, co-founder of Scotti Brothers Records Ben Scotti.
- Sylvie's brother Eddie Vartan, a music producer, is the father of French-American actor Michael Vartan.

Hamilton-Stewart

- Actor George Hamilton is the son of musician George Hamilton. His elder half-brother, William Potter, became an interior decorator for such prestigious firms as Eva Gabor Interiors.
  - George Jr. was married to actress and model Alana Stewart (see Stewart). They are the parents of fellow actor Ashley Hamilton.
    - Ashely was married to actresses Shannen Doherty and Angie Everhart.
        - Joe Pesci was also once married to Claudia Haro, a model and actress.
  - Alana Stewart later married singer Rod Stewart. They are the parents of model Kimberly Stewart and reality TV personality Sean Stewart.
    - Kimberly Stewart has a daughter with actor Benicio del Toro (see del Toro).

Hammerstein

- Theatrical impresario Oscar Hammerstein I is the grandfather of lyricist Oscar Hammerstein II.

Hanks-Wilson

- Actor Tom Hanks's son by his first marriage, to actress Samantha Lewes, is actor Colin Hanks. Tom Hanks's second wife is actress and producer Rita Wilson, with whom he has a son, Chet Hanks, actor and musician.

Hanley

- Actor Jimmy Hanley married actress Dinah Sheridan, with whom he has three children. Their children include actress Jenny Hanley and politician Sir Jeremy Hanley.
  - Dinah later married business executive John Davis. She then married actor John Merivale (see Merivale).
  - Jeremy married Verna, Viscountess Villiers.
    - Verna was previously married to the royal George Henry Child Villiers, Viscount Villiers (see Villiers).

Hanson

- Hanson is an American pop-rock band from Tulsa, Oklahoma formed by brothers Isaac (guitar, piano, vocals), Taylor (keyboards, piano, guitar, drums, vocals), and Zac Hanson (drums, piano, guitar, vocals).

Hardin

- Actor Jerry Hardin is the father of fellow actress Melora Hardin.

Hardwicke

- Actor Cedric Hardwicke was the father of actor Edward Hardwicke.

Hargitay/Mansfield

- Actors Mickey Hargitay and Jayne Mansfield are the parents of actress Mariska Hargitay, who is married to actor Peter Hermann.
- Actor Eddie Hargitay is Mickey's nephew.

Harmon/Currie

- Actress Marie Harmon is the mother of actress Sondra Currie, singer and actress Cherie Currie, and singer and actress Marie Currie.

Harmon

- Football player and sports broadcaster Tom Harmon and actress Elyse Knox are the parents of painter and actress Kristin, actress and model Kelly, and actor Mark Harmon.
  - Kristin was previously married to singer and musician Ricky Nelson, son of Ozzie and Harriet Nelson (see Nelson family). They have four three children: actress Tracy, twins and members of Nelson Gunnar and Matthew, and musician Sam.
    - Tracy was married to actor William R. Moses.
  - Mark is married to actress Pam Dawber and they have two sons.

Harper-Schaal

- Actress Valerie Harper was the second wife of actor Richard Schaal, whose daughter by his first wife is actress Wendy Schaal.

Harrison

- Beatle George Harrison is the father of musician Dhani Harrison.

Harrison

- Actor Rex Harrison was the father of actor and singer Noel Harrison, and (with actress and writer Lilli Palmer) novelist and dramatist Carey Harrison.
  - Noel was the father of actress Cathryn Harrison.

Hart

- This Canadian professional wrestling family was founded by wrestler, trainer, and promoter Stu Hart and his wife, promoter Helen Hart. They had 12 children: Smith, Bruce, Keith, Wayne, Dean, Ellie, Georgia, Bret, Alison, Ross, Diana, and Owen. All of their sons were mainly wrestlers except for Wayne, who was mainly a referee.
  - Smith has two sons who are pro wrestlers, Mike and Matt.
  - Bruce also has two sons who have wrestled at some point, Torrin and Bruce Jr.
  - Keith has a son named Conor who pursued amateur wrestling in high school.
  - Ellie and her former husband, wrestler Jim Neidhart, have three daughters. One of them, Nattie Neidhart, is a wrestler and is married to wrestler TJ Wilson.
  - Georgia and her husband, wrestler B. J. Annis, have four children. One of them, Teddy Annis, wrestles as Teddy Hart.
  - Bret's former sister-in-law was married to wrestler Tom Billington, better known as Dynamite Kid. Billington was also the first cousin of Davey Boy Smith.
  - Alison's former husband is wrestler Ben Bassarab. One of their daughters, Brook, is married to pro wrestler Pete Wilson. Their other daughter, Lindsay, has dated wrestler Randy Myers and does make-up for the wrestling reality show Total Divas.
  - Diana and her former husband Davey Boy Smith, Dynamite Kid's cousin and a wrestler, had two children. One of them, Harry Smith, is a wrestler, also.

Hauser

- see Warner-Hauser-Sperling

Hawks

- Director Howard Hawks's first wife, Athole Shearer, was a sister of actress Norma Shearer, wife of producer Irving Thalberg. Hawks's second wife, Slim Keith, later married theatrical producer Leland Hayward. Hawks's third wife, Dee Hartford, had a sister, Eden Hartford, who married Groucho Marx of the Marx Brothers. Hawks's brother, Kenneth Neil Hawks, was the first husband of actress Mary Astor. Howard Hawks's daughter, Kitty Hawks, was the former wife of Ned Tanen.

Hawkes

- Len "Chip" Hawkes, bassist from The Tremeloes, is the father of singer Chesney.

Hawn-Russell-Hudson

- Goldie Hawn and longtime partner Kurt Russell; from her second marriage to Hudson Brothers's Bill Hudson, Goldie is mother of actors Kate Hudson, who was married to Black Crowes' frontman Chris Robinson, and Oliver Hudson, who is married to actress Erinn Bartlett. Kurt Russell was married to actress Season Hubley, whose brother is actor Whip Hubley. William Hudson was married to actress Cindy Williams.

Haworth

- Joseph Haworth, 19th century actor, and William Haworth, 19th–20th century writer, actor and director; Ted Haworth (son of William Haworth), production designer and art director; Sean Haworth (son Ted Haworth), art director; Martha Haworth (daughter of William Howarth) was married to actor Wallace Ford.

Hawtrey

- Sir Charles Hawtrey was the father of actor and director Anthony Hawtrey. Other theatrical members are actors Nicholas and Kay Hawtrey, who was married to actor and director John Clark.

Hemingway

- Author Ernest Hemingway was the grandfather of actresses Mariel Hemingway and Margaux Hemingway.
  - Mariel is the mother of model and actress Dree Hemingway.

Hemsworth

- Brothers and actors Luke Hemsworth, Chris Hemsworth and Liam Hemsworth. Chris Hemsworth is married to Spanish actress Elsa Pataky, and Liam Hemsworth was married to American singer Miley Cyrus.

Henson (I)

- Muppets creator Jim Henson was the father of filmmakers Brian, Cheryl, Heather and Lisa Henson.

Note: No relation to Henson (II)

Henson (II)

- Comedian Leslie Henson was the father of actor Nicky Henson and farmer and TV presenter Joseph Henson. Nicky was married to actress Una Stubbs; their sons were composers Christian Henson, best known as the composer of the themes to Top Gear and Two Pints of Lager and a Packet of Crisps and Joe Henson. Their cousin is Adam Henson, whose father was Joseph Henson.

Hester

- Singer-songwriter Benny Hester is the father of film and television composer Eric Hester.

Hewlett

- Actor David Hewlett is the brother of actress Kate Hewlett. David was married to actress Soo Garay.

Hepburn-Ferrer

- Actors Audrey Hepburn and Mel Ferrer were the parents of film producer Sean Hepburn Ferrer.

Hilton

- Socialite Kathy Hilton is the mother of socialites and celebutantes Paris Hilton and Nicky Hilton. Kathy's half-sisters, Kim Richards and Kyle Richards, are actresses.

Ho (Tai-Loy)

- Impresario Don Ho was the father of fellow singer-musician Hoku (full name: Hoku Christianne Tai-Loy).

Holland

- Comedian and writer Dominic Holland is the father of actor Tom Holland.

Holloway

- Actor and singer Stanley Holloway was the father of actor Julian Holloway.
  - Julian is the father of former model and author Sophie Dahl, whose maternal grandfather was children's author Roald Dahl.

Houghton-Hepburn-Grant

- Actress Katharine Hepburn was the aunt of actress Katharine Houghton, who is the aunt of actress Schuyler Grant.

Houston-Drinkard-Warwick-Brown

- Singers Cissy Houston and Lee Drinkard (members of the Drinkard Singers), aunts of singers Dionne Warwick and Dee Dee Warwick, Cissy's daughter was pop diva Whitney Houston, who was married to singer Bobby Brown.

Howard (Horowitz)

- Actor brothers Moe, Shemp (real name: Samuel) and Curly Howard (real name: Jerome) were all members of the Three Stooges.

Howard

- Actor-director Rance Howard and his wife, actress Jean Speegle Howard, are the parents of actor-director Ron Howard and character actor Clint Howard.
  - Ron is the father of actresses Paige and Bryce Dallas Howard.
    - Bryce is married to actor Seth Gabel.

Howes

- Comedian, actor, singer and variety star Bobby Howes, and actress and singer Patricia Malone are the parents of actor Sally Ann Howes and clarinettist Peter Howes.

Hulbert

- Actors Claude Hulbert and Jack Hulbert were brothers. Jack Hulbert was married to actress Cicely Courtneidge for 62 years.

Humperdinck-Hues

- Martial arts actor Matthias Hues is the great-grandson of opera-composer Engelbert Humperdinck, who authored (among others) Hansel and Gretel.

Huston

- Actor Walter Huston was the father of actor and director John Huston.
  - John in turn was the father of actress Anjelica Huston and actor and director Danny Huston. Danny was previously married to Virginia Madsen, sister of Michael Madsen.

Hutton

- Timothy Hutton is the son of actor Jim Hutton, who was popular during the 1960s and 1970s. His first wife was actress Debra Winger, with whom he has one son, Noah. His second wife was Aurore Giscard d'Estaing, niece of former president of the French Republic Valéry Giscard d'Estaing, and with whom he has one son, Milo.

=== I ===
Ifans

- Actors Rhys Ifans and Llŷr Ifans are brothers. Llŷr is married to TV presenter Lisa Gwilym.

Iglesias

- Singer Julio Iglesias is the father of journalist Chabeli Iglesias, model and singer Julio Iglesias Jr., and singer Enrique Iglesias.

Inoue

- Seiyū Kikuko Inoue is the mother of seiyū, Honoka Inoue.

Irons

- Actor Jeremy Irons is married to actress Sinéad Cusack (see Cusack), and they have two sons, actor Max and photographer and former actor Samuel.
  - Sinéad also has a son, politician Richard Boyd Barrett, who was given up for adoption.

Irving

- Actress Priscilla Pointer and director Jules Irving are the parents of actress Amy, director David and singer Katie Irving.
  - Amy was married to film director Steven Spielberg (see Spielberg).

Irving

- Actor Sir Henry Irving was the father of actors Harry Brodribb Irving and Laurence Sydney Brodribb Irving.
  - Harry was the father of set designer and art director Laurence Irving and actress Elizabeth Irving.

Isley

- Brothers, musicians and singers O'Kelly Isley, Rudolph Isley, Ronald Isley, Ernie Isley and Marvin Isley, and brother-in-law Chris Jasper were the members of the singing group The Isley Brothers. Some members of the family still perform under that name. Another brother, Vernon Isley, was originally a member, but was killed in a bicycle accident at age 13, before the group was known outside of their hometown of Cincinnati.

Iwamatsu

- Actor Mako and his sister, Momo Yashima, an actress, are children of artist and author parents Taro Yashima (Jun Atsushi Iwamatsu) and Mitsu Yashima.
  - Mako was married to actress Shizuko Hoshi. Their daughters, Mimosa and Sala Iwamatsu, are also actresses.

=== J ===
Jackson

- Joseph Jackson, who had a brief and unsuccessful music career, and his wife Katherine Jackson founded an extremely successful musical family.
  - Their first five sons (their second, third, fourth, sixth, and eighth children in all)—Jackie, Tito, Jermaine, Marlon and Michael—formed the singing group The Jackson 5. Michael went on to even greater success as a solo artist, and was briefly married to Lisa Marie Presley, daughter of musical icon Elvis Presley. Jermaine is linked to the Gordy family through his former marriage to Hazel Gordy, the daughter of Motown founder Berry Gordy.
    - Jackie is the father of rapper DealZ.
    - The R&B vocal group 3T is made up of Tito's three sons (Tariano "Taj", Taryll, and Tito Joe "TJ" Jackson).
    - Michael's son Prince Jackson began an acting career in 2013.
  - Their oldest child, Rebbie Jackson, had a moderately successful career as a solo artist.
    - Rebbie is the mother of singer Austin Brown.
    - Marlon is the father of rapper Chye Beats.
  - Their fifth child and second daughter, La Toya Jackson, had modest success as a recording artist; she received major publicity in 1988 when she landed a nude layout in Playboy.
  - Their last son, Randy, replaced Jermaine in the Jackson 5 when it became The Jacksons.
  - Their third son, Jermaine Jackson, was a solo artist at Motown.
  - Their youngest child, Janet, began as a child actress and went on to a hugely successful career as a recording artist.

Jarre

- Composer Maurice Jarre is the father of screenwriter Kevin Jarre and musician Jean Michel Jarre. The latter was married to actress Charlotte Rampling – their son is the magician David Jarre – and is now married to actress Anne Parillaud.

Jenkins

- Writer and director Horace Jenkins was the father of filmmaker and artist Sacha Jenkins.

Jiminez-McCann-Brown

- Mexican voice artist Celia Jiminez was the mother of movie extra Celia McCann and film editor David McCann. David McCann is married to actress Leonell McCann.
  - Celia McCann is the mother of screenwriter Paul Brown and actress/comedian/singer Julie Brown.

Johnson-Griffith

- Dakota Johnson is the daughter of actor Don Johnson and actress Melanie Griffith.
- Melanie Griffith is the daughter of actress Tippi Hedren and half-sister of actress Tracy Griffith.
  - Don Johnson's son Jesse Johnson, from his previous marriage to actress Patti D'Arbanville, is also an actor.
  - Melanie was later married with actor Steven Bauer. She then married actor Antonio Banderas.

Jonas

- Kevin Jonas, Joe Jonas, and Nick Jonas are brothers who have performed together as the band the Jonas Brothers as well as separately. Their youngest brother, Frankie Jonas, is an actor. Their father, Paul Kevin Jonas Sr., is a songwriter.

Jones

- British rock icon David Bowie (born David Jones) was the father of British film director and producer Duncan Jones, with his first wife Angela Bowie.
  - Duncan Jones and his wife, photographer Rodene Ronquillo, have an infant son.
  - David Bowie also fathered a daughter, Lexi, with his second wife, Somali supermodel and activist Iman.
  - Iman was formerly married to NBA basketball player Spencer Haywood; they have a daughter, Zulekha Haywood.
  - Angela Bowie also has a daughter, Stacia Larranna Celeste Lipka, from her relationship with musician Drew Blood (real name Andrew Lipka).

Jones-Gretzky-Johnson

- Actress Janet Jones and NHL legend Wayne Gretzky are the parents of singer Paulina Gretzky, who is married to golfer Dustin Johnson.

Jones-Hervey

- American tenor and actor Allan Jones and his wife actress Irene Hervey were the parents of singer and actor Jack Jones.

Jones-Lipton

- Musician and producer Quincy Jones Jr. with ex-wife actress Peggy Lipton (see Lipton) have two daughters: actress Rashida Jones and stylist Kidada Jones.
  - Quincy also has a son named Quincy Jones, III, who is a composer and music producer with Swedish actress Ulla Andersson.
  - Quincy also has a daughter with the actress Nastassja Kinski (see Kinski).
  - Quincy's younger brother, Lloyd Jones, was a radio engineer for the Seattle station KOMO-TV.

Judd

- The country music vocal duo The Judds were made up of mother Naomi Judd and daughter Wynonna Judd. Naomi is the mother of actress Ashley Judd.

Jugnot

- Gérard Jugnot; his son, Arthur Jugnot; and his step-daughter, actress Flavie Péan, are actors.

=== K ===
Kaplan-Kaye-Starr

- Organist Harvey Kaye of the Spiral Starecase was the father of singer Brenda K. Starr. They share the same birth surname, Kaplan.

Kardashian-Jenner

- Reality stars Kim Kardashian, Kourtney Kardashian, Khloe Kardashian and Rob Kardashian are the children of reality star Kris Jenner and attorney Robert Kardashian. They also have two half-sisters, model Kendall Jenner and reality star Kylie Jenner, from their mother's second marriage to Olympic gold medalist Caitlyn Jenner (formerly known as Bruce Jenner).
  - Caitlyn Jenner is also father to reality star Brody Jenner and musician Brandon Jenner, from her second marriage to actress Linda Thompson.
  - Kim Kardashian-West was first married to songwriter Damon Thomas, then professional basketball player Kris Humphries, then rapper Kanye West, with whom she has four children.

Karns

- Actor Roscoe Karns was the father of actor Todd Karns.

Kasem

- TV presenter and voice actor Casey Kasem is the father of TV presenter and voice actor Mike and television and radio hostess Kerri.

Katz-Grey

- Comedian and musician Mickey Katz was the father of actor Joel Grey.
  - Joel Grey is the father of actress Jennifer Grey.

Keaton

- Actor Joe Keaton married actress Myra Keaton. Their children were actors Buster Keaton, Harry Keaton, and Louise Keaton.
  - Buster was married to actress Natalie Talmadge (see Talmadge).

Not related to actress Diane Keaton (the stage name for Diane Hall).

Keitel

- Actor Harvey Keitel is the father of fellow actress Stella Keitel.

Keith

- Actor Robert Keith was the father of actor Brian Keith.

Kemp

- Actor and musician Martin Kemp is the brother of Gary Kemp (both members of Spandau Ballet); the husband of Shirlie Holliman, one half of Pepsi & Shirlie; and the father of broadcaster Roman Kemp.

Kendal

- Actor and manager Geoffrey Kendal is the father of actresses Jennifer and Felicity Kendal.

Kensit

- Jamie Kensit, founder-member of Eighth Wonder, is a sister of Patsy, who was married to Liam Gallagher of (Oasis, Jim Kerr of (Simple Minds) and Dan Donovan of (Big Audio Dynamite).

Kidman

- Psychologist and biochemist Antony Kidman is the father of actress Nicole Kidman and television journalist Antonia Kidman.
  - Nicole was married to actor Tom Cruise (see Mapother), and to country singer Keith Urban.

King

- Pop band King is made up of four siblings. It began with five King siblings: Trillion, Marieangela "Queenie", Jazzy, Ruby and Lucius. Jazzy and Ruby left in 2013 to form band Blonde Electra; eventually, sister Jemima joined them.
  - Marieangela "Queenie" married musician Elijah Blue Allman (see Allman), son of Gregg Allman and Cher (see Bono).

Kinski

- Actor Klaus Kinski was married three times and has a child with each wife:
  - With singer Gislinde Kühlbeck, he has a daughter, actress Pola Kinski.
  - With actress Ruth Brigitte Tocki, he has a daughter, actress Nastassja Kinski.
    - Nastassja married Egyptian filmmaker Ibrahim Moussa and they have two children together, including daughter Sonja Kinski, who works as a model and actress. Nastassja then lived with musician Quincy Jones (see Jones-Lipton), with whom she has a daughter.
  - With Minhoi Geneviève Loanic, he has a son, actor Nikolai Kinski.

Kirby

- Actor Bruce Kirby was father of late actor Bruno Kirby. (Their real names are Bruno Giovanni Quidaciolu Sr. and Jr.)

Kirkwood

- Actor James Kirkwood Sr. was married to film actress Lila Lee. Their son, James Kirkwood Jr., was an actor and playwright.

Klemperer

- Composer and conductor Otto Klemperer and singer Johanna Geisler were the parents of actor and musician Werner Klemperer. Philologist and diarist Victor Klemperer is a relative.

Knowles

- Beyoncé and Solange Knowles are the daughters of Mathew Knowles, who manages their careers. Beyoncé is married to producer Jay-Z.

Köfer

- Actor Herbert Köfer was married three times
  - His son from his first marriage is cinematographer Andreas Köfer.
  - From his second marriage, to actress Ute Boeden, he has daughters Mirjam Köfer and Geertje Boeden, who are actresses, too.
  - His third marriage is to singer and actress Heike Köfer.

Kohan-Noxon

- Comedy writer Buz Kohan and novelist Rhea Kohan are the parents of television writers and producers Jenji Kohan and David Kohan. Jenji Kohan is the creator, showrunner and executive producer for Showtime's television series Weeds. She is married to Christopher Noxon, a non-show business writer. His sister is Marti Noxon, another TV writer and producer.

Koppel

- Danish musicians, singers and composers Anders Koppel, Annisette Koppel, Herman David Koppel, Lone Koppel, Naja Rosa, Nikolaj Koppel and Thomas Koppel are closely related.

Kosugi

- Ninjitsu master-actor Sho Kosugi is the father of fellow martial arts-actors Kane and Shane Kosugi.

Kravitz-Roker-Bonet

- Filmmaker and TV news producer Sy Kravitz and actress Roxie Roker were the parents of musician Lenny Kravitz.
  - Lenny and his former wife Lisa Bonet are the parents of actress Zoë Kravitz. Bonet is now married to actor Jason Momoa.

Krabbé

- Dutch actor Jeroen Krabbé is the father of radio and television presenter Martijn Krabbé.

Kubrick

- Screenwriter, producer and director Stanley Kubrick was the father of composera and filmmaker Vivian Kubrick, who scored his movie Full Metal Jacket under the pseudonym Abigail Mead. Moreover, Christianne Harlan-Kubrick (Stanley's widow and Vivian's mother) is the sister of film producer Jan Harlan.

=== L ===
Lacey

- Actor Ronald Lacey was the father of fellow actors Jonathan and Rebecca Lacey.

Lachey

- Singer Nick Lachey is the brother of singer and actor Drew Lachey.
  - Nick was married to singer Jessica Simpson (see Simpson). He then married television personality, television host, fashion model, and actress Vanessa Minnillo.
  - Drew married high school sweetheart and dancer and choreographer Lea Lachey.

Lai

- Actress Gigi Lai is the granddaughter of Hong Kong movie pioneer Lai Man-Wai.

Lamas

- Actors Fernando Lamas and Arlene Dahl are the parents of fellow actor (and martial artist) Lorenzo Lamas.

Lamb

- Actors, TV and radio personalities Sandy, Jan and Jerry Lamb are the nephew and nieces of fellow actor Ti Lung. Jan is married to singer Cass Phang.

Lancaster

- Actor Burt Lancaster was the father of actor Bill Lancaster.

Landau-Bain-Finch

- Actors Martin Landau and Barbara Bain are the parents of fellow actress Juliet Landau, and of producer Susan Finch.

Landis

- Movie writer Max Landis is the son of director John Landis.

Lawford

- Actor Peter Lawford was the father of actor Christopher Lawford.

Lawrence

- Actors Joey Lawrence, Matthew Lawrence, and Andrew Lawrence are all brothers.

Lawrence

- Guy and Howard Lawrence are brothers who perform together as Disclosure.

Lee (Chinese)

- Cantonese opera singer and actor Lee Hoi-Chuen was the father of actor and martial arts expert Bruce Lee.
  - Bruce was the father of fellow actors Brandon and Shannon Lee.

No relation to musician Tommy Lee or to soap opera actress Anna Lee.

Lee (American)

- Tommy Lee, born Thomas Lee Bass, is the son of Vassiliki Papadimitriou (Greek: Βασιλική Παπαδημητρίου), a 1957 Miss Greece contestant. His younger sister is musician Athena Lee (Athena Michelle Bass). Tommy's second wife was actress Heather Locklear (see Sambora). He then married actress and Playboy Playmate Pamela Anderson. They have two sons, model and musician Dylan Jagger Lee, and actor, model and reality star Brandon Thomas Lee. Tommy was engaged to singer Sofia Toufa and is now married to social media personality Brittany Furlan.
  - Athena was married to James Kottak, the drummer for the band Scorpions, and she was also the drummer of his solo band, KrunK.

No relation to martial artist Lee Hoi-Chuen or to soap opera actress Anna Lee.

Lee (American)

- Musician Bill Lee is the father of filmmakers Spike, David, Joie and Cinqué Lee. He is also the uncle of filmmaker Malcolm D. Lee.

Lee (English)

- Soap opera actress Anna Lee was the adopted daughter of Sherlock Holmes creator Sir Arthur Conan Doyle.
- Anna's children are fellow actors Tim Stafford (AKA Jeffrey Byron) and Venetia Stevenson, the latter of whom was married to singer Don Everly.
- Venetia and Don have three children: Stacy, Erin and Edan Everly.

No relation to martial artist Lee Hoi-Chuen, or to musician Tommy Lee.

Lee-Field

- American Civil War general Robert E. Lee is the distant relative of actress Auriol Lee.
  - Auriol is the aunt of actress Virginia Field.
    - Virginia married actor Paul Douglas. She then married actor Willard Parker. Finally, she married composer Howard Grode.
      - Paul later married actress Jan Sterling.
        - Jan was previously married to actor John Merivale (see Merivale). Jan's sister, Ann "Mimi" Adriance, was a model and businesswoman.

Leitch

- Impresario Donovan Leitch is the father of actors Donovan Leitch and Ione Skye (Leitch). Skye's first husband was Adam Horovitz of the Beastie Boys.

Lennon

- John Lennon was the father of musician Julian Lennon by his first marriage, and musician Sean Lennon by his second marriage to artist and singer Yoko Ono.

Lennon Sisters

- Sisters Dianne Lennon, Peggy Lennon, Kathy Lennon and Janet Lennon were featured performers on The Lawrence Welk Show.

Leonetti-Robbins-Beck-Hilton

- Actors Tommy Leonetti and Cindy Robbins are the parents of actress Kimberly Beck, who was married to hotel-heir William Barron Hilton, Jr. (Kim's current husband, since 1988, is producer and fellow actor Jason Clark.)

Lewis-Gilley-Swaggart-Brown

- Rock pioneer Jerry Lee Lewis is the brother of singer and pianist Linda Gail Lewis. They are cousins of country musician Mickey Gilley and disgraced televangelist Jimmy Swaggart. Another first cousin to the Lewis siblings, J.W. Brown, was the bass guitarist in Lewis's band.
  - Brown's daughter Myra Gale Brown became Jerry Lee's third wife. Their daughter, Phoebe Lewis, is a musician and her father's manager.

Lipton

- Model Peggy Lipton is the sister of actor Robert Lipton. She married Quincy Jones (see Jones) and has actress daughters, Rashida Jones and Kidada Jones.

Lithgow

- Sarah and Arthur Lithgow are the parents of actor John Lithgow, who is the father of actor Ian Lithgow.

Livesey

- Actor Sam Livesey was the father of actors Jack Livesey and Barry Livesey. His nephew and stepson was actor Roger Livesey who were also their cousins and stepbrothers.

Lloyd-Pack

- Actor Charles Lloyd-Pack was the father of actor Roger Lloyd-Pack and grandfather of actress Emily Lloyd.

Lloyd Webber

- William Lloyd Webber is the father of Andrew Lloyd Webber, composer of musical theatre, and Julian Lloyd Webber, cellist. Andrew is the father of Imogen Lloyd Webber, theatre producer; he was formerly married to singer and actress Sarah Brightman.

Lockhart

- Actors Gene and Kathleen Lockhart are the parents of actress June Lockhart, who is the mother of fellow actress Anne Lockhart.

Loggins

- Singer-songwriters Dave Loggins and Kenny Loggins are cousins.
  - Kenny is the father of singer Crosby Loggins.

López

- Cuban musicians Orestes López and Israel "Cachao" López were brothers.
  - Orestes's son, bassist Cachaito López, became famous in his last years for his work with Buena Vista Social Club.

Lowe-Swank

- Actor Rob Lowe is the brother of Chad Lowe, who was married to fellow actress Hilary Swank.
- Rob Lowe is also the father of actor John Owen Lowe.

Lupino

- Actor and director Ida Lupino was a member of the Lupino family.

Lynch (Shane)

- Shane, Keavy, Edele, Tara, and Naomi Lynch are siblings who have all had singing careers – Shane as part of the Irish boy band Boyzone, twins Keavy and Edele as part of the Irish girl group B*Witched, Tara as part of the Irish girl group Fab!, and Naomi as part of the Irish girl group Buffalo G.
  - Shane married Easther Bennett, lead singer of Eternal. He then married singer Sheena White.
  - B*Witched bandmate and actress Lindsay Armaou was married to 911 lead singer Lee Brennan.

Unrelated to screenwriter David Lynch.

Lynch (David)

- Screenwriter and director David Lynch is the father of writer Jennifer, who authored The Secret Diary of Laura Palmer to tie in with his hit series Twin Peaks.

Unrelated to the Irish Lynch musicians.

Lyte

- Anglican divine, hymn-writer and poet Henry Francis Lyte was the father of chemist and photographer Farnham Maxwell Lyte, John Walker Maxwell Lyte, Emily Jeanette Maxwell Lyte, and Phillippa Massingberd Maxwell Lyte.
  - Farnham's son was Cecil Henry Maxwell Lyte.
    - John Walker Maxwell Lyte‘s son was the English historian and archivist Henry Maxwell Lyte.
    - Phillippa's son was the British newspaper magnate and publisher Sir Arthur Pearson, 1st Baronet (see Pearson).
    - Cecil married the Hon. Mary Lucy Agnes Stourton, daughter of Alfred Stourton, 23rd Baron Mowbray (see Stourton), 24th Baron Segrave.
      - Arthur's second wife was the humanitarian Ethel Pearson. Their son was a newspaper publisher, Neville Pearson.
        - Neville first married Mary Angela Mond (see Mond). He later married the actress Gladys Cooper. His daughter with Gladys was Sally Pearson (later Sally Cooper), who was married to the actor Robert Hardy.
          - Gladys's daughter from her first marriage was Joan. After Neville, Gladys married the actor Philip Merivale (see Merivale).
            - Joan married actor Robert Morley (see Morley). Their daughter is the writer and critic Sheridan Morley.
              - Sheridan's cousin is the actress Joanna Lumley. His godparents were the dramatist Sewell Stokes (see Stokes), and actor Peter Bull (see Bull). Sheridan's son is Hugo.
                - Hugo is one of actor Noël Coward's (see Coward) many godchildren.

=== M ===
MacArthur

- Playwright Charles MacArthur was married to actress Helen Hayes. Their adopted son was actor James MacArthur.
  - James married actress Joyce Bulifant (see Bulifant). He later married actress Melody Patterson (see Patterson). His third and last wife was former LPGA golfer Helen Beth Duntz.

MacMillan-Arngrim

- Thor and Norma MacMillan are the parents of actors Alison and Stefan Arngrim.

Madden

- Good Charlotte's lead singer, Joel Madden, is the twin brother of the band's lead guitarist, Benji Madden.
  - Joel is married to reality star Nicole Richie (see Richie).
    - Nicole is the adoptive daughter of R&B and soul singer Lionel Richie.
  - Benji Madden is married to actress Cameron Diaz.

Mailer

- Novelist Norman Mailer has five sons, including producer and screenwriter Michael Mailer, actor Stephen Mailer, and actor and screenwriter John Buffalo Mailer. Michael is the son of his fourth wife, actress Beverly Bentley. John is the son of his sixth wife, actress and novelist Norris Church Mailer.

Mamet-Crouse

- Playwright, screenwriter and author David Mamet was married to actress Lindsay Crouse, daughter of playwright Russel Crouse. They are the parents of actress Zosia Mamet. Mamet is now married to singer-songwriter Rebecca Pidgeon, and Crouse to television director and editor Rick Blue.

Mansfield-Duane

- NBC radio personality Ronnie Mansfield is the father of actress Maureen Mansfield.
  - Maureen is the mother of singer-songwriters Christina Duane and Erik Carlson.

Mansfield

- Actress Jayne Mansfield was the mother of Mariska Hargitay and Jayne Marie Mansfield, who are both also actresses.

Mantegna

- Actor Joe Mantegna is the father of actress Gia Mantegna.

Marin

- Actor and comedian Cheech Marin is the father of actress Rikki Marin.

Markham

- Actor David Markham was married to dramatist Olive Dehn, and their children include actresses Kika and Petra Markham, and poet and dramatist Jehane Markham.
  - Kika was married to the late Corin Redgrave (see Redgrave family) and is stepmother of actress Jemma Redgrave.
  - Jehane was married to actor Roger Lloyd-Pack, and her stepdaughter is actress Emily Lloyd.

Marley-Hill

- Musician Bob Marley was the father of Ziggy, Julian, Ky-Mani, Stephen, Damian and Rohan Marley. Rohan is in a long-term relationship with musician Lauryn Hill.

Marsh

- Actresses Mae Marsh and her older sister Marguerite Marsh were sisters.

Marshall

- Director Garry Marshall is brother of actress and director Penny Marshall, who was married to Rob Reiner, son of Carl Reiner. He is uncle of Rob and Penny's daughter Tracy Reiner.

Martin-Halliday-Hagman

- Actress Mary Martin was the mother of actor Larry Hagman, whose daughter Heidi Hagman is an actress. Martin was married at one time to theatrical director Richard Halliday.

Masekela

- South African jazz musician Hugh Masekela is the father of American TV host Sal Masekela.

Mason

- Actress Pamela Mason first married cinematographer Roy Kellino; she later married actor James Mason. They are the parents of child actress Portland Mason and Morgan Mason, a politician and film producer, who is married to Belinda Carlisle of the Go-Go's. James later remarried, to Australian actress Clarissa Kaye.

Massey

- Actors Raymond Massey and Adrianne Allen were the parents of actors Daniel Massey and Anna Massey, former wife of actor Jeremy Brett, with whom she had two children.

McCarthy-Wahlberg

- Actress Melissa McCarthy married actor Ben Falcone (see Falcone), and is the cousin of actress and model Jenny McCarthy and her sister, professional basketball player Joanne McCarthy.
  - Jenny was married to actor John Asher, son of actor Edward Mallory (see Mallory); actress Joyce Bulifant lived with comedian and actor Jim Carrey (see Carrey), and is now married to former New Kids on the Block band member and actor Donnie Wahlberg. (See Wahlberg siblings.)

McCartney

- The Beatles' member Paul McCartney is the father of photographer Mary McCartney, fashion designer Stella McCartney and musician James McCartney.

McGann

- Actors Joe, Paul, Mark and Stephen McGann are brothers.
  - Stephen is married to screenwriter Heidi Thomas.
  - Paul's children include musician Joseph McGann and actor Jake McGann.

McGarrigle

- See Wainwright/McGarrigle singing family.

McMahon / McMahon-Levesque

- Roderick "Jess" McMahon was co-founder of Capitol Wrestling Corporation, the company that eventually became today's World Wrestling Entertainment.
  - His son Vincent J. McMahon, who succeeded Jess as the company's manager in 1953, took over ownership after Jess's death in 1954.
    - WWE is currently run by Vincent J.'s son Vincent K. McMahon, who serves as chairman and CEO of the company. His wife Linda served as CEO from 1993 until 2009.
      - Their son Shane McMahon served as WWE's Executive Vice President, Global Media until he left in 2010. Their daughter Stephanie McMahon-Levesque is WWE's Executive Vice President, Creative. Shane's wife Marissa Mazzola-McMahon is WWE's Director of National Public Relations and owns a film production company. Stephanie's husband is current WWE wrestler Paul Levesque, better known as Triple H.

McMillan

- Actor Kenneth McMillan was the father of actress Alison McMillan.

McQueen

- Actor Steve McQueen was the father of actor, martial artist and producer Chad McQueen. Chad's son is actor Steven R. McQueen (born Terence Steven McQueen II).

Mendelssohn-Itzig-Isserles-Meyerbeer

- Early Romantic composer Felix Mendelssohn was, on his father's side, a descendant of Haskalah Jewish philosopher Moses Mendelssohn, and, on his mother's side, a descendant of the Itzig family, which itself traced its ancestry to medieval Rabbi and talmudist Moses Isserles of Kraków, who himself was also a distant ancestor of grand opera composer Giacomo Meyerbeer.

Mercurio

- Actor Gus Mercurio was the father of dancer and actor Paul Mercurio.

Merivale

- Actor Philip Merivale was married to actress Viva Birkett, with whom he has a son, actor John Merivale. Philip later married actress Gladys Cooper.
  - John married actress Jan Sterling. He later married actress Dinah Sheridan (see Hanley). He lived with actress Vivien Leigh (see Olivier) until her death.
    - Jan later married actor Paul Douglas. Jan's sister, Ann "Mimi" Adriance, was a model and businesswoman.
      - Paul was also married to actress Virginia Field (see Lee).
  - Gladys was first married to Captain Herbert Buckmaster, with whom she has a daughter, Joan. Gladys then married Sir Neville Pearson (see Pearson), a British newspaper publisher. Together, they have one daughter, Sally Pearson (aka Sally Cooper).
    - Joan married actor Robert Morley. Their elder son, Sheridan Morley, became a writer and critic.
    - Sally married actor Robert Hardy.
      - Sheridan's godparents are dramatist Sewell Stokes (see Stokes) and actor Peter Bull (see Bull). Sheridan has a son, Hugo. Ruth Leon, the critic and television producer, became Sheridan's second wife. Actress Joanna Lumley is a cousin of Sheridan.
        - Hugo is one of Noël Coward's (see Coward) many godchildren.

Merrill

- Singer Helen Merrill is the mother of singer-songwriter Alan Merrill.

Michalka

- Carrie Michalka is a Christian musician and the mother of actresses and singers Aly Michalka and AJ Michalka.
  - Aly married independent film producer Stephen Ringer.

Middleton

- Actor Keith Middleton married actress, model and singer-songwriter Toni Seawright, the first African-American crowned Miss Mississippi. They are the parents of actors and singer-songwriters Qaasim Middleton and Khalil Middleton (born Zuhri Khalil Ayele Mandara Middleton).

Miles

- Bernard Miles, actor, was the father of actress Sally Miles.

Miller (Arthur)

- Playwright Arthur Miller is the father of director and screenwriter Rebecca Miller.
  - Rebecca is married to actor Daniel Day-Lewis (see Day-Lewis).

No relation to actors Brian Miller or Jason Miller.

Miller (Brian)

- Actor Brian Miller and his late wife and actress Elisabeth Sladen are the parents of actress Sadie Miller.

No relation to writer Arthur Miller or actor Jason Miller.

Miller (Jason)

- Jason Miller, actor and playwright, was the father of actor Jason Patric, by Linda, the daughter of actor and director Jackie Gleason.

No relation to actor Brian Miller or playwright Arthur Miller.

Miller (Mark)

- Mark Miller was the father of Penelope Ann Miller
  - Penelope Ann Miller was married to actor Will Arnett

No relation to writer Arthur Miller, actors Jason Miller or Brian Miller.

Miller (hip hop)

- Rapper, actor and entrepreneur Master P, and rappers and actors C-Murder and Silkk the Shocker (real names Percy, Corey and Vyshonne Miller) are all brothers. Their cousin is producer and rapper Mo B. Dick.
  - Among Master P's children are rapper and actor Romeo Miller, and singer and actress Cymphonique Miller.

Mills

- Actor Sir John Mills and his wife, playwright Mary Hayley Bell, are parents of actresses Hayley Mills and Juliet Mills, and director Jonathan Mills. Sir John's sister is actress Annette Mills.
  - Hayley Mills was married to director Roy Boulting (see Boulting). Their son, Crispian Mills, leads the band Kula Shaker. She has another son with British actor Leigh Lawson (see Lawson). Her partner since 1997 is actor and writer Firdous Bamji.
  - Juliet Mills married actor Maxwell Caulfield (see Caulfield). Their daughter is actress Melissa Caulfield (born Melissa Miklenda from Juliet's first marriage). Juliet's godmother is actress Vivien Leigh (see Olivier-Leigh) and her godfather is playwright Noël Coward (see Veitch-Coward).
  - Annette's granddaughter is actress Susie Blake.
    - Susie married actor Martin Potter.

Mitchum-Van Dien

- Actors Robert and Dorothy Mitchum are the parents of actors James, Chris, and Trini Mitchum. Robert's siblings, John and Julie Mitchum, are actors, also.
  - Chris is the father of actors Bentley and Carrie Mitchum.
  - Carrie was married to actor Casper Van Dien, who is the great-great-great nephew of author Mark Twain. Casper and Carrie's children are actors Cappy (born Casper Robert Van Dien 3rd) and Grace Van Dien. Casper is now married to actress Catherine Oxenberg, who is the daughter of Princess Elizabeth of Yugoslavia.
    - Catherine was previously married to film producer Robert Evans (see Evans).

Mitte-Carriere

- Actor RJ Mitte is the brother of fellow actress Lacianne Carriere.

Miyazaki

- Animator and filmmaker and Hayao Miyazaki is the father of Gorō, also an animator and filmmaker.

Moffatt

- Scott, Dave, Clint and Bob Moffatt were a successful boy band from the 1990s to 2001.

Morahan

- Director Christopher Morahan is married to actress Anna Carteret. They have two daughters: Rebecca, a theatre director, and Hattie, an actress.

Montalbán-Young

- Actors Ricardo Montalbán and Carlos Montalbán are brothers. Ricardo Montalbán was married to Georgiana Young, half-sister of actresses Loretta Young, Polly Ann Young and Sally Blane.

Montgomery

- Robert Montgomery, actor and director, married actress Elizabeth Bryan Allen (see Allen). They are the parents of actress Elizabeth Montgomery and actor Robert Montgomery Jr.
  - Robert was born Henry Montgomery Jr. to Henry Montgomery Sr., the president of the New York Rubber Company.
  - Elizabeth Montgomery's first marriage was to New York City socialite Frederick Gallatin Cammann. She was later married to Academy Award winning actor Gig Young (see Young). She then married producer William Asher (see Asher), the son of producer E.M. Asher. Film editor Rebecca Asher is their daughter. Her last husband was actor Robert Foxworth.
    - William Asher later married Joyce Bulifant (see Bulifant). He adopted actor John Mallory Asher, Joyce's son with actor Edward Mallory, as his own.
  - Elizabeth Bryan Allen's sister is actress Martha-Bryan Allen.

Moore

- Owen Moore was an early silent star alongside his brothers Tom, Matt and Joe Moore. Tom Moore was married at one time to actress Alice Joyce.

Morales-Zerecero-Pierce

- Mexican actor Ruben Morales was married for most of the 1980s to actress and comedian Aida Pierce. Their son is actor Ruben Morales Zerecero (Zerecero is the family's actual name on his mother's side). Actress Lucia Zerecero is a relative of Pierce and Morales Zerecero.

Morrow

- Actor and director Vic Morrow was the father of producer Carrie Morrow and her younger sister, actress Jennifer Lee Morrow (better known as Jennifer Jason Leigh). Jennifer was formerly married to director and filmmaker Noah Baumbach.

Mortimer

- Barrister and creator of Rumpole of the Bailey Sir John Mortimer KC, and his first wife, journalist and novelist Penelope Mortimer (née Fletcher), are the parents of radio producer Jeremy Mortimer. Through Penelope's first marriage, John Mortimer is also stepfather to actress Caroline Mortimer. He later remarried Penelope Gollop, and their daughter is actress Emily Mortimer.
  - Emily is married to actor Alessandro Nivola.

Mumy

- Actor Bill Mumy is the father of actors Seth and Liliana Mumy.

Muñoz

- Spanish flamenco guitarist Juan Muñoz is the father of Pilar, Lola Muñoz and Lucía Muñoz, the founding three members of the vocal group Las Ketchup, and Rocío Muñoz, who later joined her sisters in the group.

Murray

- Actor and comedian Bill Murray, and actors John, Joel and Brian Doyle-Murray are brothers.

=== N ===
Narz-Kennedy

- Game show host Jack Narz is the older brother of fellow game show host Tom Kennedy (born James Narz). Jack and another game show host, Bill Cullen, went on to marry daughters of Oscar-winning composer Heinz Eric Roemheld.

Neame-Close

- Late actress Ivy Close and her first husband, photographer Elwin Neame, had two sons: producer and screenwriter Ronald Neame, and author Derek Neame.
  - Ronald's son is producer and screenwriter Christopher Neame.
    - Christopher's only son is award-winning producer Gareth Neame.

Nelson

- Bandleader and actor Ozzie Nelson, and singer and actress Harriet Nelson (of The Adventures of Ozzie and Harriet fame) were the parents of actor and producer David Nelson and actor and singer Rick(y) Nelson.
  - Rick married artist Kristin Harmon, who is the daughter of former Heisman Trophy winner and sports broadcaster Tom Harmon, and actress Elyse Knox. Kristin's younger brother is actor Mark Harmon, who is married to actress Pam Dawber.
    - Rick and Kristin are the parents of actress Tracy Nelson, who was married to actor Bill Moses; twins Gunnar and Matthew Nelson (of the band Nelson), and actor and musician Sam Nelson.

Neville

- The jazz-R&B group The Neville Brothers originally consisted of brothers Art, Aaron, Charles, and Cyril Neville.
  - Aaron's son Ivan Neville has regularly appeared with The Neville Brothers, as well as having his own solo career.

Newman

- Film composers Alfred, Emil, and Lionel Newman were brothers.
  - Alfred's sons David and Thomas Newman are film composers, and his daughter Maria Newman is a musician and composer.
  - Randy Newman, a film composer who is better known as a popular singer and songwriter, is the son of another Newman brother, Irving Newman.
    - Joey Newman, a film composer, is the son of Lionel's daughter Jenifer Newman, a classical ballerina, and Joe Frank Carollo, a bass guitarist, best known as a member of Hamilton, Joe Frank & Reynolds.

Nichols

- Actress Nichelle Nichols is the mother of actor Kyle Johnson.

Niven

- David Niven was the father of David Niven Jr.

Nolan

- The Nolans were a successful singing act in the late 1970s and early 1980s. The band's lineup changed through the years, but the members were all sisters. They included Anne, Denise, Maureen, Linda, Bernadette and Coleen.

Norris

- Martial artist, actor and producer Chuck Norris is the brother of producer and director Aaron Norris. Chuck's sons are actors Eric and Mike Norris; he has a daughter, Dina, who is mother of actress Gabi Di Ciolli.

Norwood

- Willie Norwood is the father of R&B artists and actors Brandy and Ray J.

=== O ===
O'Herlihy

- Actor Dan O'Herlihy was the brother of television director Michael O'Herlihy.
- Dan's children are architect Lorcan O'Herlihy, fellow actors Patricia and Cormac, and Gavan O'Herlihy, who is also an accomplished tennis player.
- Patricia's children are Eilis O'Herlihy, fellow actor Colin O'Herlihy, and artist, director and photographer Micaela O'Herlihy.

O'Neal

- Actors Ryan and Kevin O'Neal are brothers. Ryan is the father of Oscar-winning actress Tatum O'Neal and actor Griffin O'Neal by his first wife, Joanna Moore. He is the father of former actor and current sports anchor Patrick by former wife Leigh Taylor-Young.

Olivier

- Writer Edith Olivier is the sister of Sydney Olivier, 1st Baron Olivier, a British civil servant, and Herbert Arnould Olivier, an artist. They are the aunt and uncles of actor Laurence Olivier.
  - Sydney is the father of the Hon. Margery Olivier, the Hon. Brynhild Olivier, the Hon. Daphne Olivier, and the Hon. Noël Olivier, a socialite and doctor.
    - Noël's daughter is author Angela Richards.
  - Laurence first married actress Jill Esmond (see Esmond). Later, he married actress Vivien Leigh. Finally, he married actress Joan Plowright (see Plowright). With Esmond, he has a son, director Tarquin Olivier. With Plowright, he has a son, director Richard Olivier, and actresses Tamsin Olivier and Julie Kate Olivier.
    - Tamsin married actor Simon Dutton.
      - Simon was first married to actress Betsy Brantley (see Brantley).
    - Vivien's daughter from her first marriage is actress Suzanne Farrington. Vivien later was the romantic partner of actor John Merivale (see Merivale) for many years until her death.

Olsen

- Actress Ashley Olsen is the twin sister of actress Mary-Kate Olsen, and sister of actress Elizabeth Olsen.

Origliasso

- Lisa Origliasso and identical twin sister Jessica Origliasso are actresses, musicians and fashion designers. They make up the duo pop group The Veronicas. Their older brother, Julian Origliasso, is their manager and producer.

Orowitz-O'Neill-Landon

- American actor and movie theatre manager Eli Orowitz and his wife, American actress and comedian Peggy O'Neill, were the parents of Eugene Orowitz, who achieved television fame under his stage name of Michael Landon.
  - Michael had children in show business from each of his three marriages. Michael adopted the son of his first wife, who went on to become actor Mark Landon. TV multihyphenate Michael Landon Jr. and television screenwriter Christopher B. Landon are Michael's sons from his second marriage. Actress Jennifer Landon is from Michael's final marriage.

Orr-Page

- American actor William T. Orr and American actress Joy Page were the parents of directer Gregory Orr

Ortiz de Pinedo

- Actor Oscar Ortiz de Pinedo was the father of actor, comedian, producer and director Jorge Ortiz de Pinedo, and comedian and writer Oscar Ortiz de Pinedo. Jorge Ortiz de Pinedo's second wife was producer Luigina Tuccio, and Jorge's eldest son, Pedro, is also a producer.

Osbourne

- Rock and roller and "heavy metal" pioneer Ozzy Osbourne and wife, television personality and agent Sharon Osbourne, are the parents of actress Aimee Osbourne; Fashion Police star, singer and actress Kelly Osbourne; and producer and director Jack Osbourne.
  - From a previous marriage, Ozzy is the father of actress Jessica Starshine Osbourne.
    - Sharon is the daughter of music manager Don Arden (see Arden-Osbourne).

Osment

- Former child actor Haley Joel Osment is the older brother of actress and singer Emily Osment. Their father is actor Michael Eugene Osment.

Osmond

- Actors, singers and television hosts Donny Osmond and Marie Osmond are brother and sister. Donny formerly sang with his brothers Alan, Wayne, Merrill and Jay as The Osmonds; younger brother "Little" Jimmy Osmond later joined the group as well as having solo success. Some of the brothers still perform together as "The Osmond Brothers" while Alan's sons perform as "The Osmonds Second Generation".
  - Those sons include Michael Alan, Nathan George, Douglas Kenneth, David Levi, Scott Merrill, Jonathon Pinegar, Alexander Thomas and Tyler James.
  - Marie's daughter, Rachael Blosil, married Gabriel Krueger, a fashion designer.

Oswalt

- Comedian Patton Oswalt was married to writer Michelle Eileen McNamara until her death in 2016. His brother is YouTube comedy writer Matthew Oswalt.

Owens-Haggard-Alan

- Country singers Buck Owens and Bonnie Owens were the parents of another country singer, Alvis Alan Owens, professionally known as Buddy Alan. After Buck and Bonnie divorced while their son was growing up, she married another country singer, Merle Haggard; Alan stayed with his mother.

=== P ===
Paich

- Composer and musician Marty Paich is the father of musician, songwriter and session player David Paich, a founding member of Toto.

Palance

- Actor Jack Palance was the father of actress Holly Palance.

Palmer

- Actor Geoffrey Palmer was father of director Charles Palmer, who was married to actress Claire Skinner.

Paltrow

- Producer Bruce Paltrow and his wife, actress Blythe Danner, are parents of actress Gwyneth Paltrow.
  - Gwyneth was married to musician Chris Martin of Coldplay.
  - Blythe is the aunt and Gwyneth the cousin of The L Word actress Katherine Moennig.

Pantoja

- Singer Chiquetete was the cousin of singer Isabel Pantoja.

Parks

- Photographer and director Gordon Parks was the father of director Gordon Parks Jr.

Patterson

- Actress Melody Patterson is the daughter of Rosemary Wilson, an official in the Miss Universe contest and a dancer with Warner Bros., who doubled for Joan Crawford in several films. Melody was married to actor James MacArthur (see MacArthur). Later, she married musician Vern Miller.

Patton

- see Chuckle-Patton

Peck

- Actor Gregory Peck was the father of actors Cecilia and Tony Peck, and grandfather of Ethan Peck.

Peckinpah

- Screenwriter and director Sam Peckinpah was the uncle of producer David Peckinpah. Their real names were David Edward Samuel Ernest Peckinpah Jr. and III, respectively.

Penhaligon-Munro

- British actress Susan Penhaligon is the mother of fellow actor Truan Munro.

Penn

- Actress Eileen Ryan, and writer and director Leo Penn were the parents of two actors, Sean and Chris Penn, and a musician, Michael Penn. Sean was married first to Madonna and later to Robin Wright Penn.
  - Michael is married to musician Aimee Mann.

Penry-Jones

- Actor Peter Penry-Jones was married to actress Angela Thorne. They have two children, actors Laurence and Rupert.
  - Laurence is married to actress Polly Walker.
  - Rupert is married to actress Dervla Kirwan.

Perkins (Berenson-Perkins)

- Actor Osgood Perkins (born James Ripley Osgood Robert Perkins Sr.) was the father of actor Anthony Perkins.
  - Anthony is the father of actor Osgood "Oz" Perkins (born James Ripley Osgood Robert Perkins Jr.) and musician Elvis Perkins; their mother (Anthony's widow) is Berry Berenson. Her sister is actress Marisa Berenson of Barry Lyndon fame.

Perry

- The Band Perry consists of three siblings: Kimberly, Neil and Reid Perry. They are the niece and nephews of baseball author and journalist Dayn Perry.
  - Kimberly is married to baseball player J. P. Arencibia.

Pertwee

- Playwright, screenwriter and director Roland Pertwee is the cousin of comedy actor Bill Pertwee, and father of actor Jon Pertwee and screenwriter Michael Pertwee.
  - Jon's first wife was actress Jean Marsh. His son from his second marriage is actor Sean Pertwee.

Phillips

- John Phillips, most famous as a member of The Mamas & the Papas, was the father of actress Mackenzie Phillips by his first wife, Susan Adams; singer Chynna Phillips by his bandmate and second wife, Michelle Phillips; and actress and model Bijou Phillips by his third wife, actress Geneviève Waïte. Chynna is currently the wife of actor William Baldwin (see Baldwin).

Phoenix

- Actors River, Joaquin, Rain, Liberty and Summer Phoenix are siblings. Summer Phoenix is married to actor Casey Affleck (see Affleck family).

Pine

- Actors Robert Pine and Gwynne Gilford are the parents of fellow actor Chris Pine. Anne Gwynne was the mother of Gwynne Gilford.

Pleasence

- Sir Donald Pleasence was the father of Miranda, Polly Jo and Angela Pleasence.

Plummer-Grimes

- Actor Christopher Plummer and actress Tammy Grimes were the parents of actress Amanda Plummer.

Poole

- Brian Poole, the frontman of Brian Poole and The Tremeloes, is the father of singer Karen and Shelly, who had hits together as Alisha's Attic. Shelly is married to Ally McErlaine, guitarist from the band Texas.

Porcaro

- Jazz drummer Joe Porcaro is the father of musicians, songwriters and session players Jeff, Mike and Steve Porcaro, all members of Toto.

Potts

- La Tanya Potts is fourth-generation American film pedigree; her relatives include Nyanza Potts Sr., Nyanza Potts Jr. (The Little Colonel, 1935), Arvert Potts (Title Big Shot), Mahlon Potts (King Kong) and Malcolm Potts (Uncle Tom's Cabin), who serves as cinema historian, exhibitor and the administrator of the Potts' family motion picture legacy. The family's cinema career began in 1929. Malcolm Potts has dedicated twenty years behind the scenes in casting and producing; he is the Executive Chair of Go2 Studios West.

Power

- Actor Tyrone Power was the father of Romina Power, Taryn Power and Tyrone Power Jr.

Presley

- Singer Elvis Presley and wife Priscilla Presley were parents of pop singer Lisa Marie Presley; she was the former wife of pop star Michael Jackson and actor Nicolas Cage.

Prinze-Gellar

- Comedian and actor Freddie Prinze was the father of actor Freddie Prinze Jr., who married actress Sarah Michelle Gellar.

Pryor

- Comic actor Richard Pryor was the father of actress Rain Pryor.

=== Q ===
Quaid

- Dennis Quaid and Randy Quaid are brothers. Dennis was formerly married to actress Meg Ryan; they are the parents of fellow actor Jack Quaid.

Quinn

- Actor Anthony Quinn was the father of fellow actors Alex, Danny, Francesco, Lorenzo and Valentina Quinn. Danny was married to actress Lauren Holly, who, in turn, was married to comedian and actor Jim Carrey.

Quintanilla-Pérez

- Musician and producer A.B. Quintanilla is the older brother of Tejano music superstar Selena. Their sister, Suzette Quintanilla, was the drummer for their band Selena y Los Dinos. Selena's widower, Chris Pérez, is a Grammy-winning guitarist, playing in Selena y Los Dinos.

=== R ===
Reddy

- Australian actor Max Reddy is the father of singer Helen Reddy. Helen's nephew is musical theatre performer Tony Sheldon.

Redford

- American actor and director Robert Redford is the father of actress and director Amy Redford.

Redgrave-Richardson-Nero

- Roy Redgrave was the father of Sir Michael Redgrave.
  - Sir Michael was the father of siblings Vanessa, Lynn and Corin Redgrave.
    - Vanessa was married to director Tony Richardson. Their daughters are Natasha and Joely Richardson. Vanessa and Italian actor Franco Nero's son is screenwriter and director Carlo Nero.
      - Natasha was first married to producer Robert Fox; her widower is actor Liam Neeson, with whom she had two sons.
      - Joely was previously married to producer Tim Bevan.
    - Lynn was married to actor and director John Clark.
    - Corin's widow is actress Kika Markham and his daughter is actress Jemma Redgrave.

Refn

- Painter Holger Refn is the father of film editor Anders Refn and director Peter Refn.
  - Anders married cinematographer Vibeke Winding (see Winding); their son is director Nicolas Winding Refn.
    - Nicolas married actress Liv Corfixen (see Corfixen).

Reiner

- Comedian Carl Reiner was the father of actor and director Rob Reiner, who was married to Penny Marshall, sister of Garry Marshall. Carl's daughter is author and playwright Annie Reiner. Rob Reiner's and Penny Marshall's daughter is actress Tracy Reiner, who is Carl Reiner's eldest grandchild.

Richie

- R&B and soul singer Lionel Richie is the adoptive father of reality star Nicole Richie and biological father of model Sofia Richie.
  - Nicole is married to Good Charlotte's lead singer, Joel Madden (see Madden).
    - Joel's twin brother, Benji Madden, is the lead guitarist of Good Charlotte. He is married to actress Cameron Diaz.

Ritchie

- Kid Rock (born Robert James Ritchie) is a musician. His sister, Jill Ritchie, is an actress.
  - Kid Rock was once married to actress and Playboy model Pamela Anderson.

Ring

- James H. Ring was a leading comedian of the Boston Museum company.
  - Blanche Ring, his granddaughter, was an American singer and actress in Broadway theatre productions. Four generations of her ancestors were Shakespearean actors. She married an American stage and film actor, Charles Winninger.
    - Her sister, Julie, is a stage actress who married actor Al Sutherland (see Sutherland). Their son is A. Edward Sutherland, who became a film director.
      - Their sister, Frances, married Thomas Meighan, the popular stage and later silent film actor.
        - Their brother, Cyril Ring, was a silent film actor and husband of actress and dancer, Charlotte Greenwood.
          - Jane Ring Frank, their great-niece, is a conductor.

Riperton-Rudolph-Marie

- Singer Minnie Riperton and musician Richard Rudolph are the parents of actress and comedian Maya Rudolph. Maya has a child with director and producer Paul Thomas Anderson.

Ritter

- Country singer Tex Ritter was the father of actor John Ritter.
  - John and his first wife, actress Nancy Morgan, are the parents of actor Jason Ritter. John's widow is actress Amy Yasbeck.

Robards

- Actor Jason Robards Sr. is the father of Jason Robards Jr.
  - Jason Jr. was once married to actress Lauren Bacall (see Bacall). He is the father of actors Jason Robards III with his first wife, Eleanor Pittman, and actor Sam Robards with Bacall.
    - Lauren was the wife of actor Humphrey Bogart.

Robert

- Actor Yves Robert was first married to actress Rosy Varte, and, with her, has a son, actor Jean-Denis Robert. He then married actress Danièle Delorme (born Gabrielle Danièle Marguerite Andrée Girard; see Girard).
  - Rosy later married actor and director Pierre Badel.

Roberts

- Siblings Julia Roberts, Lisa Roberts Gillan and Eric Roberts are all actors.
  - Eric is the father of actress Emma Roberts.

Robinson

- Actor Matt Robinson was the father of fellow actress Holly Robinson. Holly is married to former football player turned broadcaster Rodney Peete.

Robinson-Clark

- We the Kings lead singer and YouTube personality Travis Robinson-Clark is married to actress and model Jenny Robinson-Clark. Travis's brother, musician Taylor Clark, is the former We the Kings drummer.

Rocco

- Actor Alex Rocco is the adoptive father of motion picture director Marc Rocco.

Rodgers-Guettel

- Composer Richard Rodgers was the father of author Mary Rodgers, who was the mother of composer Adam Guettel.

Ronson-Jones

- Mick Jones of Foreigner is the stepfather of producer and DJ Mark Ronson, fashion designer Charlotte Ronson, and DJ and singer Samantha Ronson.

Ross-Gordy-Naess

- Motown diva Diana Ross of The Supremes is the mother of singer Rhonda Ross Kendrick (through her marriage to Berry Gordy); actress Tracee Ellis Ross and model Chudney Ross (via Robert Ellis Silberstein); and later married and divorced Arne Næss Jr., with whom she had actor Evan Ross, and was the stepmother of pop singer Leona Naess.

Rossellini-Lindström-Bergman

- Actress Isabella Rossellini is the child of film director Roberto Rossellini and actress Ingrid Bergman. News anchorwoman Pia Lindström, the daughter of Ingrid from her first marriage, is the half-sister of Isabella.

Rosson

- Actress Helene Rosson was a noted silent screen actress. Her brothers were cinematographer Harold Rosson (also known as Hal Rosson), and directors Arthur Rosson and Richard Rosson.

Rouse-Michaels

- Screenwriter and director Russell Rouse and his wife actress Beverly Michaels were the parents of editor Christopher Rouse.

=== S ===
Sagal

- Director Boris Sagal was the father of actors Jean, Joe, Katey and Liz Sagal. Boris's second wife was the dancer and actress Marge Champion, who was previously married to choreographer, actor and dancer Gower Champion.

Salkind

- Producer Alexander Salkind was the father of fellow producer Ilya Salkind. Ilya was previously married to actress Skye Aubrey, the daughter of actress Phyllis Thaxter.

Samuel

- Musician Seal (born Olusegun Adeola Akarbi Samuel) is the brother of Jeymes Samuel, better known as The Bullitts, a singer-songwriter. He married supermodel Heidi Klum.
  - Heidi has a child with Italian Formula One team manager Flavio Briatore.

Sánchez

- Guitarist Antonio Sánchez Pecino was father of guitarist Ramón de Algeciras, singer Pepe de Lucía and guitarist Paco de Lucía.
  - Pepe's daughter is singer Malú, who has a daughter with politician Albert Rivera.
  - Paco's godson is the son of singer Alejandro Sanz, who was married to actress and model Jaydy Michel.
    - Alejandro's goddaughter is the daughter of singer David Bisbal, who is married to actress Rosanna Zanetti.

Santiago-Casanova

- Guitarron player Natividad Santiago was the father of fellow guitarron player Enrique Santiago. Both have been members of the Vargas de Tecalitlan. Santiago's daughter is comedian and singer Cessy Casanova.

Sarafian

- Film director Deran Sarafian and scriptwriter Tedi Sarafian are the sons of Richard C. Sarafian, another film director. They are nephews of director and screenwriter Robert Altman.

Sariñana

- Film director Fernando Sariñana is the father of actress and singer Ximena Sariñana.

Savage

- Siblings Fred, Ben and Kala Savage are all actors.

Savage-Youngs

- Actor John Savage (born John Youngs) is the brother of fellow actors Jim and Gail Youngs. John's daughter is actress Jennifer Youngs.

Savalas-Adams-Sheridan

- Brothers Telly and George Savalas were actors. Telly was married to actress Sally Adams, whose stage names were Dani Sheridan and Sally Sheridan.
  - Telly's daughter, Candace Savalas, and his stepdaughter, Nicolette Sheridan, are actresses.

Sawalha

- Actor Nadim Sawalha is the father of actresses Nadia and Julia Sawalha.

Schneider-King

- Actor and comedian Rob Schneider is the brother of producer John Schneider.
  - Rob was once married to former model London King, with whom he has a daughter, musician Elle King (born Tanner Elle Schneider). He later married television producer Patricia Azarcoya Arce.

Schöbel-Doerk-Lacasa

- Singer and actor Frank Schöbel was married to singer and actress Chris Doerk, and then in a long-term relationship with singer and artist Aurora Lacasa; their daughter is singer and actress Dominique Lacasa.

Scott

- Directors and producers Ridley and Tony were brothers.

Scott-Dewhurst

- Twice-married and -divorced actors George C. Scott and Colleen Dewhurst had two sons, Alexander Scott and actor Campbell Scott.

Seals-Duncan

- Musicians Jim Seals, of Seals and Crofts, and Dan Seals, of England Dan & John Ford Coley, who also had a solo career, are brothers. They are cousins to country singer, guitarist and songwriter Troy Seals, who, in turn, is the uncle of country singer Brady Seals. Another country artist, Johnny Duncan, was a cousin to Jim and Dan.

Sellers

- Actors Britt Ekland and Peter Sellers are the parents of actress Victoria Sellers.

Selznick

- Lewis J. Selznick is the father of film producer and screenwriter David O. Selznick and film producer Myron Selznick.
  - David married theatrical producer Irene Mayer (see Mayer), daughter of Louis B. Mayer, a film producer. They had two sons, Lewis Jeffrey and Daniel Selznick, both of whom also became film producers. He later married the actress Jennifer Jones.
    - Jennifer was previously married to actor Robert Walker (see Walker). They have two sons, actors Robert Walker Jr. and Michael Walker. After Selznick, Jones married industrialist Norton Simon.
    - Daniel married Susan Warms Dryfoos, daughter of Orvil E. Dryfoos, publisher of The New York Times.
  - Myron married silent film actress Marjorie Daw.
    - Marjorie was previously married to director and actor A. Edward Sutherland (see Sutherland).

Severn

- Clifford Severn, Raymond Severn, Christopher Severn, Yvonne Severn, Venetia Severn, William Severn, Ernest Severn and Winston Severn were siblings.

Seymour

- Rosemary Nest Scott-Ellis (see Ellis) and George Fitzroy Seymour (cadet branch of Marquess of Hertford and Duke of Somerset of Thrumpton Hall) are the parents of literary critic and author Miranda Seymour.
  - Miranda married the novelist and historian Andrew Sinclair (see Sinclair) and had a son, Merlin. Her second marriage was to Anthony Gottlieb, then executive editor of The Economist and author of a history of Western philosophy.

Shakur

- Rapper Tupac Shakur has several family members who were members of the Black Panthers: Mutulu Shakur, his step-father; Assata Shakur, his step-aunt; Billy Garland, his biological father; and Afeni Shakur, his mother.
  - His stepbrother, Mopreme Shakur, is a rapper.

Shankar-Jones

- Renowned sitar player Ravi Shankar is the younger brother of Indian classical dancer Uday Shankar.
  - Uday was the father of Bengali musician Ananda Shankar and actress and dancer Mamata Shankar. Ananda's widow is Indian dancer and choreographer Tanusree Shankar.
  - Ravi was married to Indian classical musician Annapurna Devi, daughter of renowned instrumentalist and teacher Allauddin Khan. He is the father of musician and composer Shubhendra Shankar, American jazz-pop singer Norah Jones and British sitar player Anoushka Shankar.

Shatner-Gretsch

- Actor William Shatner is the father of actress Melanie Shatner, who is married to actor Joel Gretsch.

Shaughnessy

- Screenwriter Alfred Shaughnessy is the father of actors Charles Shaughnessy and David Shaughnessy.

Shaw

- Actor and novelist Robert Shaw was the father of actor Ian Shaw.

Shaw brothers

- Movie studio executives Run Run and his third brother Runme Shaw were owners of Shaw Brothers Studio and Shaw Organisation. The other brothers, Runje and Runde, were also involved in the movie industry.

Shipman

- Silent film producer Ernest Shipman married Actress Helen Barham. they were the parents of Screenwriter Barry Shipman and he married Dancer and Film Actress Gwynne Shipman they were the parents of Nina Shipman

Shu

- Actress and singer Barbie Shu is the sister of Dee Shu; they had a notable pop career together.

Shue

- Andrew and Elisabeth Shue are actors. She is married to director Davis Guggenheim (An Inconvenient Truth), whose father Charles Guggenheim was also a documentary-maker. Andrew is married to news journalist Amy Robach.

Sheen

- see Estévez

Shrapnel

- English actor John Shrapnel is the father of actors Lex Shrapnel and Tom Shrapnel, and writer Joe Shrapnel.

Siemaszko

- Actor Casey Siemaszko is the older sister of actress Nina Siemaszko.

Simon

- Jazz writer and musician George T. Simon is the uncle of singer-songwriter Carly Simon.
  - Carly's first husband was singer-songwriter James Taylor (see Taylor).
    - James and Carly are the parents of musicians Ben and Sally Taylor.

Simon-Brickell

- Singer-songwriter Paul Simon is the father of fellow singer-songwriter Harper Simon by his first marriage to photographer Peggy Harper.
- His second marriage was to actress and author Carrie Fisher, the daughter of singer Eddie Fisher and actress Debbie Reynolds.
- His third and current marriage is to former New Bohemians lead singer-songwriter Edie Brickell. They have three children: Adrian, Lulu and Gabriel. Edie and her stepson Harper have a band called The Heavy Circles.

Simpson

- Actress, fashion designer and singer Jessica Simpson was married to singer, producer and actor Nick Lachey. Jessica's sister is actress and singer Ashlee Simpson.
  - Lachey is now married to actress Vanessa Minnillo.
  - Ashlee was married to Fall Out Boy bassist Pete Wentz.

Sinatra

- Singer and actor Frank Sinatra was the father of actor and singer Frank Sinatra Jr., and actress and singer Nancy Sinatra.
  - Sinatra was also married to actresses Ava Gardner and Mia Farrow.

Sinden

- Actor Sir Donald Sinden, whose younger brother is the actor Leon Sinden (whose partner was the actor Walter Carr), was married to the late actress Diana Mahony. They had two children: actor Jeremy Sinden, who was married to the actress Delia Lindsay, and actor and film director Marc Sinden, who was married to film producer Jo Gilbert. The Edwardian actress Topsy Sinden and her brother actor Bert Sinden were cousins.

Singer

- Musician Jacques Singer is the father of actors Marc and Lori Singer.
  - Jacques is the uncle, and Marc and Lori are the cousins, of film director Bryan Singer.

Skarsgård

- Swedish actor Stellan Skarsgård is the father of the actors Alexander, Gustaf, Bill, Valter and Kolbjörn Skarsgård.

Slezak

- Opera singer Leo Slezak is the father of actor Walter Slezak.
  - Walter's daughter is actress Erika Slezak.

Smallbone-Fink

- Contemporary Christian singer Rebecca Smallbone, better known by her stage name, Rebecca St. James, is the older sister of fellow contemporary Christian artists Joel and Luke Smallbone, who perform as the band For King & Country. In addition, she is the wife of Jacob Fink, bass guitarist of Foster the People.

Smith

- Rapper and actor Will Smith is the father of actor Trey Smith by his first wife, actress Sheree Zampino, and actors Jaden and Willow Smith by his second and current wife, actress Jada Pinkett Smith.

Smollett

- Actor and photographer Jussie Smollett is the older brother of actors Jurnee Smollett and Jake Smollett.

Sorvino

- Actor Paul Sorvino is the father of actress Mira Sorvino.

Spacek-Fisk

- Actress Sissy Spacek is the mother of actress Schuyler Fisk.

Spall

- Actor Timothy Spall is the father of actor Rafe Spall.
  - Rafe is married to actress Elize du Toit.

Spelling

- Producer Aaron Spelling was married to actress Carolyn Jones. He then married author and television personality Candy Spelling. He and Candy are the parents of actress Tori Spelling and actor Randy Spelling.
  - Carolyn later married producer Herbert Greene.
  - Tori was once married to actor and playwright Charlie Shanian. She is now married to actor Dean McDermott.
    - McDermott was once married to actress and singer Mary Jo Eustace.

Spielberg-Capshaw

- Director Steven Spielberg married first actress Amy Irving, and is now husband of actress and producer Kate Capshaw. Spielberg and Capshaw are the parents of actress and musician Sasha Spielberg.
  - Kate's daughter from her previous marriage is actress Jessica Capshaw.

Sprouse

- Dylan and Cole Sprouse are actors and twin brothers, who came to fame as children in a popular Disney Channel sitcom, The Suite Life of Zack and Cody.

Stallone

- Actor, writer and hairstylist Frank Stallone Sr. is the father of actors Sylvester Stallone and Frank Stallone with first wife and astrologer Jackie Stallone.
  - Sylvester is the father of actor Sage Stallone with wife Sasha Czack. He later married model and actress Brigitte Nielsen. He then married model Jennifer Flavin.
    - Sage married actress Starlin Wright.

Standing

- Actor Herbert Standing is the father of economist Guy Standing, and actors Wyndham Standing, Percy Standing, Jack Standing and Herbert Standing Jr.
  - Herbert Jr.'s daughter is actress Joan Standing.

Starkey/Starr

- Musician Ringo Starr of The Beatles is married to Barbara Bach and is the father of musician Zak Starkey (Starr's legal surname).

Stauffer

- Actor Jack Stauffer was married to actress Renne Jarrett, with whom he has a son, actor Drew Stauffer.
  - Renne later married film director Bruce Bilson (see Bilson).

Stefani

- Animator and musician Eric Stefani is older brother of singer Gwen Stefani, who was married to fellow singer Gavin Rossdale.

Stephens

- Actor Sir Robert Stephens was the father of actors Chris Larkin and Toby Stephens through his third wife Dame Maggie Smith. He later married actress Patricia Quinn, whose nephew is rock musician Jonny Quinn. Smith later remarried, to playwright and screenwriter Beverley Cross.
  - Toby is married to actress Anna-Louise Plowman.

Sterling/Sothern/Jeffries

- Actor Robert Sterling and his first wife actress Ann Sothern were the parents of actress Tisha Sterling. Sterling's second marriage was to his Topper co-star Anne Jeffreys.

Stewart

- Singer Rod Stewart has been married several times, and has many children. He was first married to actress Alana Stewart (née Collins). Together, they have a daughter, model Kimberly Stewart, and a son, reality star Sean Stewart.
  - Kimberly has a daughter with actor Benicio del Toro (see del Toro).
  - Alana was also previously married to actor George Hamilton. They have one child, actor Ashley Hamilton.
- Rod then began a relationship with model Kelly Emberg. They have a daughter, model and singer Ruby Stewart.
- Rod's second marriage was to model Rachel Hunter. They have two children.
- Rod's third marriage is to model Penny Lancaster. They also have two children.

Stiller

- Anne Meara and husband Jerry Stiller are parents to son Ben Stiller and daughter Amy Stiller. Ben is married to actress Christine Taylor.

Stills

- American rock musician Stephen Stills and his former wife, French singer-songwriter Véronique Sanson, are the parents of musician Chris Stills.

Stockwell

- Actors Nina Olivette and Harry Stockwell were the parents of actors Dean and Guy Stockwell.

Stoppard

- Playwright, screenwriter and critic Sir Tom Stoppard is the father of actor Ed Stoppard.

Streisand-Gould-Brolin

- Actress Barbra Streisand was married to actor Elliott Gould, with whom she had one child, actor Jason Gould. She is now married to actor James Brolin.
- James Brolin is the father of actor Josh Brolin by his first marriage. His second marriage was to actress Jan Smithers.
  - Josh Brolin was married to actress Diane Lane.
  - Barbra's half sister is actress and singer Roslyn Kind.

Streep-Gummer

- Actress Meryl Streep is married to sculptor Don Gummer, and their children include musician Henry Gummer and actresses Mamie and Grace Gummer. Streep is also the sister-in-law of actress Maeve Kinkead.

Sturges-Close-Merrill-Robertson

- Director Preston Sturges married Eleanor Post Close, the daughter of Edward Bennett Close and Marjorie Meriwether Post. Edward Bennett Close, by his second wife, became the grandfather of actress Glenn Close. Marjorie Post, by her second husband, was the mother of actress Dina Merrill, whose second husband was late Oscar-winning actor Cliff Robertson.

Sumner

- Rock musician Sting (real name Gordon Sumner) has been married to actress Frances Tomelty, and actress and producer Trudie Styler. Among his children with Tomelty is musician and entrepreneur Joe Sumner; among his children with Styler are actress Mickey Sumner and musician Eliot Sumner.

Sutherland

- Donald Sutherland was the father of actors Kiefer (by his second wife, Canadian actress Shirley Douglas), and Rossif and Angus (both by his third wife, actress Francine Racette).

Sutherland

- Director and actor A. Edward Sutherland is the nephew of both actors Blanche Ring (see Ring) and Thomas Meighan. He was first married to actress Marjorie Daw. Later, he married actress Louise Brooks.
  - Marjorie was previously married to actor Myron Selznick (see Selznick).

Swift

- Clive Swift is the brother of actor David Swift. Clive is the father of TV gardener Joe Swift, whose mother is Margaret Drabble. Margaret is the sister of writer A. S. Byatt. David is the father of Julia Swift.

=== T ===
Talmadge

- Norma and Constance Talmadge were 1920s movie stars. Their sister was actress Natalie Talmadge, who was the first wife of actor Buster Keaton (see Keaton).

They are not related to Hollywood stuntman Richard Talmadge.

Tamblyn

- Actors Eddie Tamblyn and Sally Aileen Tamblyn were married, and their sons were actor Russ Tamblyn, and singer and musician Larry Tamblyn of The Standells.
  - One of Russ's children is actress Amber Tamblyn.

Tarbuck

- English comedian Jimmy Tarbuck is the father of presenter and actress Liza Tarbuck.

Taurog-Cooper

- Director Norman Taurog was the uncle of actor and director Jackie Cooper.

Taylor

- Singer-songwriter James Taylor (see Taylor) has four musical siblings with recorded albums: Alex, Livingston, Kate and Hugh Taylor. James was once married to singer-songwriter Carly Simon (see Simon).
  - James and Carly are the parents of musicians Ben and Sally Taylor.

Thicke

- Actor and singer-songwriter Alan Thicke is the brother of composer Todd Thicke.
  - Alan's sons are actor Brennan Thicke and singer Robin Thicke. Alan used to be married to singer Gloria Loring.
    - Robin married actress Paula Patton.

Thomas-Donahue

- Comic actor Danny Thomas is the father of actress Marlo Thomas, film producer Tony Thomas and former actress Terre Thomas.
  - Marlo has been the wife of talk-show host Phil Donahue since 1980.

Thompson-Tilbury

- English dancer, actress and producer Lydia Thompson was the mother of stage and screen actress Zeffie Tilbury.

Thompson

- Actor Eric Thompson is married to actress Phyllida Law, and they have two daughters, actresses Emma and Sophie Thompson.
  - Sophie is married to actor Richard Lumsden.
  - Emma was married to Kenneth Branagh and later to Greg Wise.

Tisdale

- Actresses Ashley and Jennifer Tisdale are sisters.

Tom

- Soap opera actress Heather Tom is the elder sister of twins David (her frequent co-star) and Nicholle Tom.

Travolta

- Ellen, Joey, Ann, Margaret, Sam and John Travolta are siblings.
  - Ellen is married to actor Jack Bannon.
  - John was married to actress and model Kelly Preston.

Trippy

- YouTube personality and We the Kings band bassist Charles Trippy is son of musician and former Gregg Allman Band (see Allman) percussionist Chaz Trippy. Charles was formerly married to YouTube personality and travel vlogger Alli Speed. His sister, Melissa Trippy, is also a YouTube personality.

Troughton

- Actor Patrick Troughton was the father of actors David and Michael Troughton.
  - David is the father of actor Sam Troughton and cricketer Jim Troughton.
    - Actor Harry Melling is the son of Patrick's elder daughter, Joanna.

Troup

- Actors Bobby Troup and Julie London were the parents of fellow actresses Cynnie, Ronne and Kelly Troup.

Tsang

- Television presenter, comedian, actor and director Eric Tsang is the father of actor Derek Tsang, and singer and actress Bowie Tsang.

Tse

- Producer and actor Patrick Tse, and former wife actress Deborah Lee were the parents of actor and singer Nicholas Tse, who was married to actress and Cantopop singer Cecilia Cheung.

Tyler

- Playboy model Bebe Buell and her partner, rock musician Todd Rundgren, raised Liv Tyler. Liv later found out that Steven Tyler of Aerosmith was her biological father; he is also the father of model Mia Tyler. Liv was married to musician Royston Langdon. They are unrelated to the Bonnie Tyler family.

=== V ===
Vale

- Actor, comedian and singer Raul Vale was married to actress and singer Angelica Maria.
  - Their daughter, Angelica Vale, is an actress, comedian and singer.

Van Dyke-Nance

- Actors Dick and Jerry Van Dyke are brothers.
  - Dick's son Barry Van Dyke is an actor, writer and producer. Barry's son Shane is a screenwriter, actor and director.
  - Jerry's daughter Kelly Jean Van Dyke was an adult film actress, who was married to actor Jack Nance.
    - Dick's grandson Carey Van Dyke is an actor.

Van Patten-Balsam-Dugan

- Actors Dick and Joyce Van Patten are siblings. Director Tim Van Patten is their half-brother.
  - Dick is the father of actors Vince, Nels and James Van Patten.
  - Joyce and her first husband, actor Martin Balsam, are the parents of actress Talia Balsam. Joyce's second husband was actor and director Dennis Dugan.

Van Peebles

- Film writer and director Melvin Van Peebles is the father of fellow director (and actor) Mario Van Peebles.

Vernon

- Actor John Vernon was the father of actress Kate Vernon.

Vertue

- Media executive and producer Beryl Vertue is the mother of producer Sue Vertue, who is married to screenwriter Steven Moffat.

Vidal

- Actresses Lisa, Christina and Tanya Vidal are sisters.

Voight-Jolie-Haven-Taylor

- Actor Jon Voight is the father of actress Angelina Jolie and director James Haven, by his former wife, Marcheline Bertrand. Jon Voight's brother is songwriter Chip Taylor.

Von Erich

- Professional wrestler and promoter Jack Adkisson, better known as Fritz Von Erich, was the father of five sons, who followed in his footsteps as wrestlers under the Von Erich name: Kevin, David, Kerry, Mike and Chris. The family is famous for its supposed "curse" – although Jack lived until his natural death, his eldest son, Jack Jr., was killed in a freak childhood accident; David died in disputed circumstances; and Mike, Chris and Kerry all took their own lives.
  - Kevin's son Ross and Kerry's daughter Lacey are wrestlers, who perform under the Von Erich name.

=== W ===
Wagner

- Actor Jack Wagner was married to actress Kristina Wagner.

Wahlberg

- Donnie Wahlberg is best known as a member of pop group New Kids on the Block and as an actor. Rapper-turned-actor Mark Wahlberg (not to be confused with actor and talk-show host Mark L. Walberg) is his brother. Actors Robert Wahlberg and Paul Wahlberg are also their brothers. They are the sons of actress Alma McPeck Wahlberg Conroy.
  - Donnie is married to actress and model Jenny McCarthy (see McCarthy).
    - Mark is married to actress and model Rhea Durham.

Wainwright-McGarrigle-Roche

- Loudon Wainwright III (son of Time columnist and Life editor Loudon Wainwright Jr.), his sister Sloan Wainwright, son Rufus Wainwright and daughter Martha Wainwright are all singer-songwriters. Rufus and Martha are the children of Loudon's former wife Kate McGarrigle, of the singing sisters Kate and Anna McGarrigle. Their sister Jane McGarrigle is a composer, while Anna's daughter Lily Lanken (by her husband, journalist Dane Lanken, who has sung with the McGarrigles) is a singer. Loudon's second daughter, Lucy Wainwright Roche, whose mother is Suzzy Roche of singing sisters The Roches, is another singer-songwriter.

Walker

- Broadway actress Charlotte Walker was the mother of character actress Sara Haden.

Walker-Jones

- Actor Robert Walker and his wife Jennifer Jones were the parents of actors Robert Walker Jr. and Michael Walker.

Wanamaker

- Actor and director Sam Wanamaker was the father of actress Zoë Wanamaker.

Warner-Hauser-Sperling

- Brothers Harry, Albert, Sam and Jack Warner founded and directed for Warner Brothers studio.
  - Actor Cole Hauser is the son of Wings Hauser, another actor, who is the son of screenwriter Dwight Hauser. Cole's maternal great-grandfather was film mogul Harry Warner, and his maternal grandfather was Milton Sperling, a Hollywood screenwriter and independent film producer.

Warren-Alba

- Actor Michael Warren is the father of actor and producer Cash Warren, whose wife is actress Jessica Alba.

Waterman

- Actor and singer Dennis Waterman is the father of actress Hannah Waterman by his second wife, actress Patricia Maynard. His third wife was actress Rula Lenska.

Waterston

- Actor Sam Waterston is the father of actor James Waterston and actress Katherine Waterston.

Watson

- Bobs Watson, Delmar Watson, Harry Watson, Coy Watson Jr., Vivian Watson, Gloria Watson, Louise Watson, Billy Watson and Garry Watson were siblings.

Watling

- Actor Jack Watling and actress Patricia Hicks are the parents of actresses Dilys Watling and Deborah Watling, and actor Giles Watling.

Way

- Brothers Gerard and Mikey Way are singers in My Chemical Romance.

Wayans

- Damon Wayans, Dwayne Wayans, Elvira Wayans, Keenen Ivory Wayans, Kim Wayans, Marlon Wayans, Nadia Wayans, Shawn Wayans and Chaunté Wayans are siblings.

Wayne

- Actor John Wayne was the father of actors Patrick Wayne and Ethan Wayne.

Weinstein

- Producer Harvey Weinstein and brother Bob Weinstein founded Miramax and The Weinstein Company.

Weisser

- Actor Norbert Weisser is the father of fellow actor Morgan Weisser.

Weissmuller

- Actor Johnny Weissmuller is the father of Johnny Weissmuller Jr.

Westcott

Actor Gordon Westcott was the father of actress Helen Westcott.

West-Scales

- Actor Lockwood West is the father of actor Timothy West.
  - Timothy married actress Prunella Scales and their son is actor and director Samuel West.

Whitmore

- Actor James Whitmore is the father of fellow actor James Whitmore Jr.

Wilcox

- Documentary maker and producer Desmond Wilcox was married to journalist-turned-presenter Esther Rantzen. Their daughter Rebecca is a producer and television presenter.

Wilde

- Singer-songwriter Marty Wilde, and singer and actress Joyce Baker are the parents of composer, performer and producer Ricky Wilde, and singer and actress Kim Wilde.

Williams (Hank)

- Hank Williams was a leading figure in country music history.
  - Hank's son Randall Hank, better known as Hank Williams Jr., has had an enormously successful country career of his own.
    - Hank Jr.'s children Hank Williams III (real first name Shelton) and Holly Williams are both successful country musicians.
  - Jett Williams, the posthumously born daughter of Hank and half-sister to Hank Jr., had modest success in country music.

Williams (John)

- Composer and conductor John Williams, and actress and singer Barbara Ruick are the parents of Toto's lead singer Joseph Williams and drummer Mark T. Williams. John is the brother of percussionist Don Williams, who has performed on many of John's film scores, and the son of jazz drummer Johnny Williams. Barbara Ruick is the daughter of late actors Melville Ruick and Lurene Tuttle.

Willis-Moore

- Actor Bruce Willis married actress Demi Moore, and their daughter is actress Rumer Willis.
- Demi Moore later married actor Ashton Kutcher.

Wilson/Love

- Murry Wilson, a musician and record producer, was the father of Brian, Dennis and Carl Wilson. The three sons, plus their first cousin Mike Love, were members of The Beach Boys.
  - Brian and his first wife, singer Marilyn Rovell, are the parents of Carnie and Wendy Wilson, singers who formed two-thirds of the vocal group Wilson Phillips.

Wilson

- Actors Andrew Wilson, Owen Wilson and Luke Wilson are brothers, and unrelated to The Beach Boys family.

Winans

- David and Dolores Winans, gospel music singers, recorded both together and separately as "Pop" and "Mom" Winans, and became progenitors of a highly prolific musical family. The following musicians can trace their family roots to Pop and Mom Winans:
  - The second through fifth sons of Pop and Mom – Ronald, Marvin, Carvin and Michael Winans – are best known as the gospel group The Winans. Marvin's former wife, Vickie Winans, has had a successful music career, and Michael has recorded with his wife Regina.
    - Four sons of The Winans – Marvin Jr., Carvin Jr., Michael Jr. and another son of Carvin Sr., Juan Winans – have recorded together as Winans Phase 2.
    - Mario Winans is Vickie's son from her prior marriage to Ronald Brown.
  - Daniel Winans, a gospel singer and producer, is Mom and Pop's sixth son.
  - The seventh Winans son, Benjamin "BeBe" Winans, and the eighth child and oldest daughter, Priscilla "CeCe" Winans, have performed both as BeBe & CeCe Winans and as solo artists.
  - The two youngest of Pop and Mom's children, Angie and Debbie Winans, have recorded both together and as soloists.

Winding (Vinding)

- Author and journalist Andreas Vinding with his wife, actress Agis Winding, has a son, journalist Ole Vinding.
  - Actor, producer and author Thomas Winding is the son of Ole.
    - Thomas was married five times. With his former wife, cinematographer Vibeke Winding, he is the father of singer Kasper Winding and actress Sara Winding. With Lulu Gauguin (see Gauguin), he has a daughter, singer Alberte.
      - Vibeke later married film editor and director Anders Refn (see Refn). They are the parents of director and screenwriter Nicolas Winding Refn.
        - Nicolas is married to actress Liv Corfixen (see Corfixen).
      - Kasper was first married to actress Brigitte Nielsen; their son is television personality Julian Winding. He was later married to actress Simone Bendix. With writer and photographer Pia Tryde, he has a son, screenwriter Oliver Winding.
        - Nielsen was married to actor Sylvester Stallone (see Stallone), director and photographer Sebastian Copeland (see Casadesus), television writer Raoul Meyer, and producer Mattia Dessi.
      - Alberte was married to singer and composer January Rørdam. She is now married to guitarist Andreas Fuglebæk.

Wong

- Brothers Michael and Russell Wong are both actors.

Woodward

- Edward Woodward was the father of actors Tim and Peter Woodward.

NOTE: The family is unrelated to American actress Joanne Woodward

Wynn-Williams

- Actor Ed Wynn was the father of actor Keenan Wynn, whose sons are screenwriters Ned and Tracy Wynn. Keenan's daughter Hilda was married to actor and musician Paul Williams.

=== Y ===
York-Wells

- Susannah York is the mother of Orlando Wells.

Young

- Actor Gig Young, born Byron Elsworth Barr, was married to Sophie Rosenstein, the resident drama coach at Paramount, actress Elizabeth Montgomery (see Montgomery), and German magazine editor Kim Schmidt.

Yuen

- Martial arts choreographer Yuen Woo-ping is the son of Yuen Siu-tien, a martial arts film actor.

=== Z ===
Zane

- Lisa and Billy Zane are siblings.

Zanuck

- Film producer and former 20th Century Fox VP of production Darryl F. Zanuck has a son, film producer and former head of production at Fox Richard D. Zanuck. Richard's son Dean Zanuck is also a film producer.

Zappa-Sloatman-Robinson

- Composer, musician and producer Frank Zappa was the father of actress, author and singer Moon Unit, who is married to Paul Doucette, former drummer and current rhythm guitarist of Matchbox Twenty; actor, composer and musician Dweezil; actor, author and musician Ahmet Zappa; and actress and photographer Diva Zappa. Frank's niece is actress (and, more recently, costumer) Lala Sloatman, who was married to Black Crowes lead singer and co-founder Chris Robinson.

Zimbalist

- Composer and violinist Efrem Zimbalist and his wife, soprano Alma Gluck, were the parents of actor Efrem Zimbalist Jr.
  - Efrem Jr. is in turn the father of actress Stephanie Zimbalist.

Zucker

- David and Jerry Zucker are brothers.

== Celebrity brothers not listed above ==
- Jason and Michael Castro
- Dana Andrews and Steve Forrest (born William Forrest Andrews)
- James Arness and Peter Graves (born James and Peter Aurness)
- Aaron Ashmore and Shawn Ashmore
- John and James Belushi
- Timothy, Joseph, Sam and Ben Bottoms
- Scott and Brian Bloom
- Flesh and Layzie Bone, founding members of Bone Thugs-n-Harmony
- Keith and Robert Carradine, and half-brother Michael Bowen (all sons of Sonia Sorel; Keith and Robert from her marriage to John Carradine, and Michael Bowen from her marriage to artist Michael Bowen)
- Gerald and Bob Casale, founding members of Devo
- Cameron, Andrew and Lochie Daddo
- Melvin, Kenneth and Kevon Edmonds (born Kevin Edmonds) – Melvin and Kevon are members of the R&B group After 7, while Kenneth is better known as R&B singer and producer Babyface
- Nesuhi and Ahmet Ertegun
- Chris and Scott Evans
- Max and Thom Evans
- George Ezra and Ten Tonnes
- Fred and Richard Fairbrass, members of Right Said Fred
- Tim, Andrew and Jon Farriss, members of INXS
- Peter and Bobby Farrelly
- Justin and John Fashanu
- Tim and Neil Finn, of Split Enz and later Crowded House
- Daniel and Jerome Flynn
- Parry and Lloyd Glasspool
- James and William Goldman, writers
- Matt and Luke Goss, members of the boy band Bros
- Cedric "K-Ci" and Joel "Jo-Jo" Hailey – K-Ci & JoJo, and of Jodeci
- Murray and Anthony Head
- Michael, Ricky and Samuel Hui
- James, and Phillip Ingram
- Craig and Dean Lennox Kelly
- Andrei Konchalovsky (born Andrei Mikhalkov) and Nikita Mikhalkov
- John Leslie (born Leslie John Stott) and Grant Stott
- Jason and Jeremy London
- Los Lonely Boys – Henry, Jojo and Ringo Garza
- Ken and Kermit Maynard
- The Marx Brothers – Leonard ("Chico"), Arthur ("Harpo"), Julius ("Groucho"), Milton ("Gummo) and Herbet ("Zeppo"). They also had an older brother, who died as an infant.
- James McCourt and Richard McCourt
- The Melendez brothers – Ricky, Carlos and Oscar Melendez
- The Mills Brothers – John Jr., Herbert, Harry and Donald
- Lars Mikkelsen and Mads Mikkelsen
- Eddie Montgomery of Montgomery Gentry and John Michael Montgomery
- Mark, Bob and Jim Mothersbaugh, also founding members of Devo
- The Neville Brothers – Art, Aaron, Charles, and Cyril Neville
- Christopher and Jonathan Nolan
- Jerry and Charlie O'Connell
- Logan and Jake Paul
- Mark and Michael Polish
- AJ and Curtis Pritchard
- The Proclaimers – identical twins Charlie and Craig Reid
- Charlie and Stephen Puth
- The Ritz Brothers – Al, Jimmy and Harry
- Paul and Jonathan Ross
- Anthony and Peter Shaffer
- The Sherman Brothers — Robert and Richard
- George and Geoff Stults
- John and David Suchet
- Patrick and Don Swayze
- DeVante Swing (born Donald DeGrate Jr.) and Dalvin DeGrate, members of Jodeci with another set of brothers, K-Ci & JoJo
- Alex and Eddie Van Halen, founding members of the rock band Van Halen
- Ronnie, Donnie and Johnny Van Zant – Ronnie was a founder and lead vocalist of Lynyrd Skynyrd, Donnie was founder and lead vocalist of 38 Special, and Johnny is the lead vocalist of today's Lynyrd Skynyrd. Donnie and Johnny also perform together as Van Zant.
- Jeremy and Tim Vine
- Johnny and Edgar Winter
- George, Malcolm and Angus Young, members of the rock band AC/DC
- Shannon and Jared Leto
- Josh and Zac Farro from rock band Paramore

== Celebrity sisters ==
- The Andrews Sisters – Laverne, Maxene and Patty Andrews
- Haylie and Hilary Duff
- Gayle and Gillian Blakeney, twins
- Moya Brennan and Enya (born Máire Philomena Ní Bhraonáin and Eithne Pádraigín Ní Bhraonáin, respectively)
- Brittany and Cynthia Daniel (twins)
- Marieh and Majandra Delfino
- Emily and Zooey Deschanel
- Nora and Delia Ephron
- Dakota and Elle Fanning
- Magda, Zsa Zsa and Eva Gabor
- La'Myia and Meagan Good
- Lynx and Lamb Gaede members of the white nationalist folk duo Prussian Blue)
- Melissa Joan and Emily Hart
- Olivia de Havilland and Joan Fontaine (born Joan de Beauvoir de Havilland)
- Norah Jones and half-sister Anoushka Shankar are the daughters of Ravi Shankar
- Beyoncé and Solange Knowles
- Shelby Lynne and Allison Moorer
- Martie Maguire and Emily Strayer, members of The Chicks
- Kate Mara and Rooney Mara
- Christine, Dorothy and Phyllis McGuire
- Alyson and Amanda Michalka
- Kylie and Dannii Minogue
- Mary-Kate and Ashley (twins), and Elizabeth Olsen
- Danielle and Kay Panabaker
- Sylvia Pasquel, and half-sisters Rocio Banquells and Alejandra Guzman; Pasquel and Banquells were daughters of Rafael Banquells, while Pasquel and Guzman's mother is Silvia Pinal)
- Michelle and Dedee Pfeiffer
- The Pointer Sisters – Ruth, Anita, Bonnie and June Pointer
- Vanessa and Lynn Redgrave
- Natasha Richardson and Joely Richardson, daughters of Vanessa Redgrave
- The Rudge Sisters
- Nadia and Julia Sawalha
- SHeDAISY – Kristyn, Kelsi and Kassidy Osborn
- Sister Sledge – Kim, Debbie, Joni and Kathy Sledge
- Jessica and Ashlee Simpson
- Britney and Jamie Lynn Spears
- Jennifer and Meg Tilly
- Lisa, Christina and Tanya Vidal
- The Wachowskis – Lana and Lilly
- Natalie and Lana Wood
- Madeline, Vanessa and Yvonne Zima

== Celebrity siblings ==
- John and Mary Badham
- Singers Daniel and Natasha Bedingfield
- Actors Spencer and Abigail Breslin
- Shirley MacLaine and Warren Beatty
- Jonas, Linn and Jenny Berggren, all founding members of Ace of Base
- Kirk Cameron and Candace Cameron Bure
- The Carpenters – Richard and Karen Carpenter
- Nick, Leslie and Aaron Carter
- Keith Chegwin was the twin of Jeffrey Chegwin and brother of Janice Long
- Bunny, Eldra "El", James, Mark and Randy DeBarge, all members of the band DeBarge, plus five other musical siblings who were not in that band – Robert "Bobby" and Tommy (both members of Switch), Chico, Darryl, and Carol "Peaches" DeBarge
- Karin and Olof Dreijer, members of The Knife
- Joanne Dru and Peter Marshall
- Rebekah, Sebastian, Peter and Dominic Elmaloglou (all appeared at one point in Home and Away)
- Karolina, Marisela and Victor Esqueda, singers
- Jere and Kim Fields, actresses
- Leif Garrett and Dawn Lyn
- Esther Gordy Edwards, Anna Gordy Gaye, Gwen Gordy Fuqua, Berry Gordy and Robert Gordy
- Ilene and Todd Graff
- Frankie and Ariana Grande
- Oliver and Kate Hudson, and Wyatt Russell
- The Jets – originally LeRoy, Eddie, Eugene, Haini, Rudy, Kathi, Elizabeth and Moana Wolfgramm. Six younger Wolfgramm siblings are now members, namely Donnie, EtiVise, Maliana, Mika, Natalia and Tony. Two other younger siblings, Kelela and Tiare, are in a side project, a rock band called Against the Season.
- The Kelly Family
- Merald "Bubba" and Gladys Knight
- Jamie Lomas and Charley Webb
- Michael and Virginia Madsen
- Tia and Tamera Mowry (twins), and Tahj Mowry
- Laila Morse (born Maureen Oldman) and Gary Oldman
- Tracy Nelson, and twins Gunnar and Matthew Nelson
- Finneas O'Connell and Billie Eilish
- Hayden and Jansen Panettiere
- Sarah-Jane and Andrew-Lee Potts
- Selena and Abraham "A.B." Quintanilla III
- Rockwell and half-sister Rhonda Ross Kendrick are the children of Berry Gordy
- Ananda and Mamata Shankar
- Taylor and Austin Swift
- Heather, and David and Nicholle Tom (fraternal twins)
- Dick and Joyce Van Patten, and half-brother Tim Van Patten
- Tom Smothers and Dick Smothers
- Harvey Weinstein and Bob Weinstein
- Jeff Wincott and Michael Wincott

== See also ==
- List of sibling pairs
- List of boxing families
- List of entertainment industry dynasties
