= Wilfredo (character) =

British comedy cabaret act

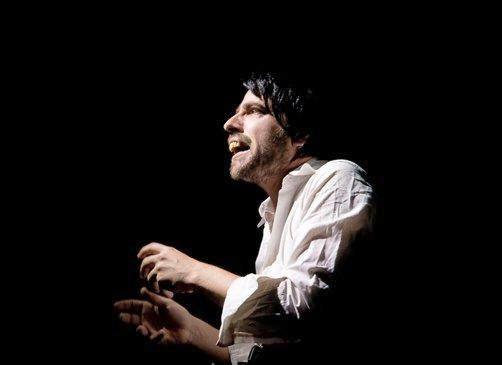
- Wilfredo performs in Camden Town, London

Background information
- Genres: Cabaret, comedy, pop music
- Years active: 2008–present
- Members: Matt Roper Wilfredo; Katie Pollak Mana Maria; Kris Howe Uncle Ignacio

Wilfredo is a fictional comedy character, created and portrayed by the British comedian Matt Roper.

The character is an obnoxious, deluded and uncouth satire of a romantic singer characterized in a commedia dell'arte style. Wilfredo has acquired a cult status, particularly among music festival audiences and on the alternative cabaret and comedy circuit in London and in New York City.

Roper has toured the character internationally, performing in Spain, Italy, the Czech Republic, Germany, Hungary, Slovakia, South Africa, Australia, Argentina, and Iceland.

== Character origins and appearance ==
Physically, the character of Wilfredo is a grotesque caricature of Falstaffian appearance: trousers pulled up to the top of a corpulent stomach, a tight flamenco shirt, a wild black mop wig and a set of prominent prosthetic teeth. Typically, the character will always hold a pint of beer on stage, even whilst dancing and singing. He smokes his way throughout songs, salivating over the audience and musicians while berating them with rich expletives. Critics have described the character as "a wonderful and vile creation", "strangely endearing", "joyful and grin-inducing", and "utterly charming and uplifting".

The character began his life onstage performing cover versions of songs by Leonard Cohen, Phil Spector, Amy Winehouse and the Rolling Stones. In an interview with the student media, Roper stated: "My father was a trad comic so I grew up around a lot of the old school; people like Frankie Howerd and lots of music hall acts. I'd be taken to theatres and all these smoky clubs where there was always a mad speciality artist or a singer in a spangly outfit or a dinner suit onstage, crooning covers. Wilfredo comes from that world for sure." Elsewhere in the same interview, Roper said he hoped Wilfredo "offers escape".

The character is usually accompanied by a guitarist onstage, often by Katie Pollak in the role of Mana Maria, the younger sister of Wilfredo. The character of Maria wears identical teeth and hair, although bespectacled. She is the polar opposite of Wilfredo: where Wilfredo is brash and loud, Maria in contrast is totally mute and performed in a subtle style. On occasion (as at the 2011 Edinburgh Festival) Kris Howe may accompany – also in character – as Wilfredo's 'Uncle' Ignacio.

I’ve undressed women all over the world and they come in so many different shapes and sizes. And I’ve loved every one of them. I have never taken a wife but in many ways I married my career. I don't understand the singer from Coldplay. When he goes on tour he takes his Hollywood wife with him. Who takes an olive to the olive grove?

— Wilfredo interviewed, December 2011

== Early career ==
Roper first performed the character in 2008 at a benefit in Totnes, Devon before performing at the Glastonbury Festival weeks later. In August he performed at the Maker Sunshine Festival in Cornwall with a full band, before guesting with Barcelona-based gypsy jazz combo Gadjo. The character made his London debut at Camden Town's Lockstock Festival in November 2008, performing a cover of the Amy Winehouse song Rehab. Encouraged by the positive reception of these appearances, Roper began to perform Wilfredo sporadically until the summer of 2009 while writing and exploring the concept of the character more fully. Another Glastonbury Festival appearance followed, as did performances at the Winchester Hat Fair. In September 2009 Wilfredo began to establish himself by way of guest performances on the London comedy circuit. In March 2010 Wilfredo was placed alongside the Penny Dreadfuls and Angelos Epithemiou in Pippa Evans' Old Time New Time Music Hall at the Canal Café Theatre, performing parodies and original song.

== Major productions ==
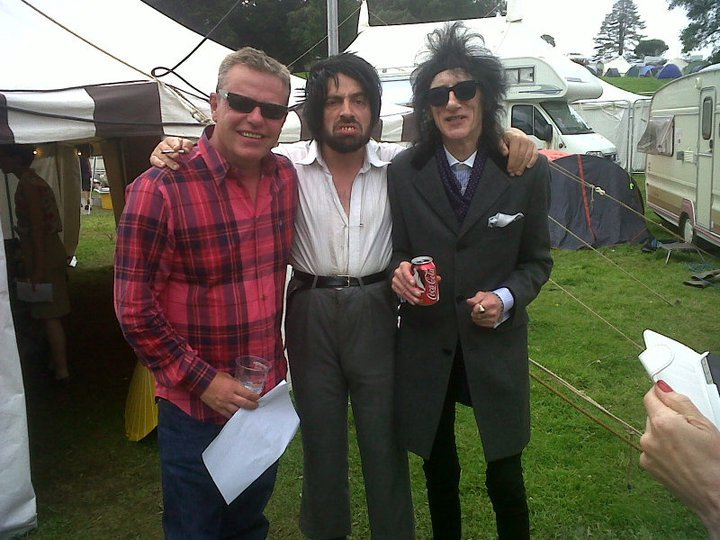
Suggs, Wilfredo and John Cooper Clarke, backstage at the Port Eliot Festival, Cornwall, 22 July 2011

Roper presented a sixty-minute show Wilfredo: A Man and His Music at the Etcetera Theatre in April 2010. Featuring the character Mana Maria on guitar, Wilfredo performed covers (Leonard Cohen's Hallelujah), parody (Those Were The Days) and original songs from a fictionalized back catalogue of albums. Various affairs with prominent women including Victoria Beckham, American First Lady Michelle Obama and the Princess of Wales are claimed for the first time in The Child Is Not Mine, which becomes a flagship signature song. A journalist on the Camden New Journal described "initial terror" at the character, later adding "I left unscathed, having spent the evening roaring with laughter." Roper then presented the show for the Brighton Festival Fringe at the Komedia, before performing the character in Lecce, Italy for the Factory K-NOS artist collective.

In July 2010 Wilfredo became the surprise breakthrough act at the Port Eliot Festival in Cornwall, performing two outdoor sets with Mana Maria before hosting the main stage, where he introduced Jarvis Cocker and Talvin Singh to the festival audience. Increasingly satirizing the cult of celebrity, Wilfredo was also filmed chatting to Biba founder, the fashion designer Barbara Hulanicki, giving the impression to onlookers that she was his own personal designer. The following year Wilfredo once again hosted, appearing onstage with John Cooper Clarke, Louis Eliot and Bellowhead.

In August 2010 the character returned to Italy for an appearance at the Salento Summer Festival.

From 10 June – 7 July 2013 Wilfredo appeared at the Cape Town Comedy Festival at the Baxter Theatre. On 12 July the character performed at the Desmond and Leah Tutu Legacy Foundation comedy gala in the presence of Archbishop Desmond Tutu. On 25 June Wilfredo appeared on the Expresso show, aired nationally on the South African SABC network.

== Wilfredo: Erecto! ==
I found myself sucked delightfully into his weird and wonderful world, as he dexterously fondled the funny bones of the modest crowd: about a dozen people clustered around a handful of lantern-lit tables. It was an intimate evening in an intimate venue, one that whirled with sexual innuendos and original pop-tastic ballads. Whether you were laughing at his megalomaniacal afflictions, grimacing at his trademark mouthful of mammoth ivories (he was "born with the full set", if you ever wondered) or at his penchant for phlegmatic hacking – salivating and interspersing his satirical musings with mucus filled eruptions – it was difficult not to be seduced by this Spaniard's musical ruminations.

— Erotic Review, July 2011

In March 2011 Wilfredo enjoyed a limited season at the Leicester Square Theatre where he began to preview new material for the forthcoming Edinburgh Festival Fringe. The writer Joanna Lloyd described him as "the bastard love child of Les Patterson and Julio Iglesias." The show – a retrospective journey of his life and times told for the first time entirely in original song – eventually became Wilfredo: Erecto!. Further previews were later staged to small audiences at the Canal Cafe Theatre. In addition, on 16 June Roper presented the character to an audience at the Poetry Society in Covent Garden, reciting a spoken-word version of Leonard Cohen's 'Hey, That's No Way To Say Goodbye'.

An appearance in the first series of Rufus Hound's What's So Funny? for BBC Radio 7 (now BBC Radio 4 Extra) was enough to initiate further interest in the character from radio audiences, while an appearance at the E4 Udderbelly for Arthur Smith's Pissed Up Chat Show (sold to audiences as the only show where the host is sober but all his guests are drunk) followed successfully in July 2011.

Wilfredo: Erecto! was performed nightly at the Edinburgh Festival Fringe 4–28 August 2011 at the Underbelly, drawing good houses and a positive commentary in the British press. Isy Suttie, writing in The Guardian newspaper, described the show as "weird, intimate and wonderful" while What's on Stage observed "Wilfredo sees himself as a kind of Messiah figure, born to sing, write poetry, and seduce an endless succession of women." The British comedy industry website Chortle noted the character as "sometimes cantankerous, often lecherous and almost certainly consumptive... coughing and burping his way through the set, at one point hacking up phlegm like a horse chewing a toffee" while the critic at ThreeWeeks lauded Wilfredo as both "disgusting and arousing". The Erotic Review found the character "a lewd yet loveable Latino" and Time Out "an extraordinary creation". From others, Roper found himself tipped as a Steve Coogan for the next generation, while The List found Wilfredo simply "unlikeable".

== Wilfredo... and Other Beautiful Creatures ==
In June 2011 the first of five editions of Wilfredo... and Other Beautiful Creatures was staged at the Phoenix Artist Club in Soho. Headed by Wilfredo and featuring a variety of musical and comic guests, the show took place each month in the basement club. Guests included the Pajama Men, Isy Suttie, Barry from Watford, Loretta Maine, Lewis Schaffer and Lenny Beige.

On 25 December 2011, Wilfredo recorded the Christmas Day edition of The Comedy Club for BBC Radio 4 Extra.

== The Wonderful World of Wilfredo ==
In February 2012 the first performance of The Wonderful World of Wilfredo was presented at London's BAC, programmed for the N20 Comedy Festival. In April Wilfredo guested at the Camden Roundhouse for a short season in performances curated by Scottee for CircusFest 2012. On 6 July Wilfredo performed in Arthur Smith's Benefit for the Royal Yacht at the E4 Udderbelly at the Southbank Centre, an alternative Queen's Diamond Jubilee Concert.

The Wonderful World of Wilfredo was a sixty-minute performance during which Wilfredo elaborated on his friendship with Serge Gainsbourg and boasted of affairs with both the actress Angelina Jolie and the British politician Harriet Harman. Reviewed by the festival press as "seductive", "physically repellent but charming" and "quite inappropriate", it was performed nightly at the 2012 Edinburgh Festival Fringe at Just the Tonic from 2 to 26 August after previewing in Manchester. In Manchester he guested on Beatwolf Radio, interviewed by Vic McGlynn and performing a live performance of 'Lady Holiday', during which Mike Joyce, former drummer of iconic Manchester band the Smiths, played percussion. In Edinburgh the show gained positive press reviews. The Skinny hailed the show as "a strange blend of obnoxious, almost Sadowitzian humour and exquisitely beautiful music." Time Out magazine noted "Roper inhabits his creation deeply, undercutting his hauteur and self-delusion with beams of charm and dollops of soul". A studio soundtrack of the show has since been recorded and released for download.

== Wilfredo Comes To Town (Documentary short) ==
12 July 2013 saw the first screening of the documentary short Wilfredo Comes To Town at London's Leicester Square Theatre in an evening billed as Wilfredo on Stage/Wilfredo on Screen: A Celebration. Shooting over the winter of 2011/2 on the streets of London and at Abbey Road Studios, it was an attempt to move the character from the stage to the screen. The film-maker Mat Snead has said of the film: "I think what I wanted to do was to try and take Wilfredo off stage and almost push the absurdity of it by showing him in a real world environment. Wilfredo really does exist on stage, so what I was trying to do was get him off stage and get him into some different environments and do some things that you can't do on stage. I’ve seen a lot of those kinds of acts, but there are very few that can actually pull it off."

== Wilfredo: Deconstructed and World Tour – present ==
Following a short Central European tour of Budapest, Brno, Bratislava and Hradec Králové, Wilfredo: Deconstructed opened at the Edinburgh Festival 31 July to 24 August 2014, drawing good reviews in the festival press. The Scottish magazine The Skinny noted the performance as "a cabaret performance much closer to the real thing than you might have believed possible on arrival. For all the parody (which could so easily descend into dated, 2D 'funny foreigner' stuff) the joke is perhaps on us" while Kate Copstick of the Scotsman newspaper hailed the character as "a master of seduction" and the music "timeless". Such criticism was later lost on BBC Radio 2, who banned Peace All Over The World (At Christmas Time) – a festive single release by the character in a duet with the comedian Pippa Evans under the guise of Latino star Carmella – on the basis of "daytime listeners being offended".

Wilfredo embarked on a Spring tour of the Asia-Pacific region in 2015, having opened at the Adelaide Fringe on 1 March and giving performances in Manila, Philippines, Singapore and at the Melbourne International Comedy Festival.

On 6 July, Wilfredo Unchained: Live in California was released worldwide as a download-only concert album, originally recorded in Petaluma, California in April 2014.

Wilfredo made regular weekend appearances at the Slipper Room, a vaudeville and variety theatre on the Lower East Side of Manhattan, New York City.
