= Matt Roper =

British comedian, writer and musician (born 1977)

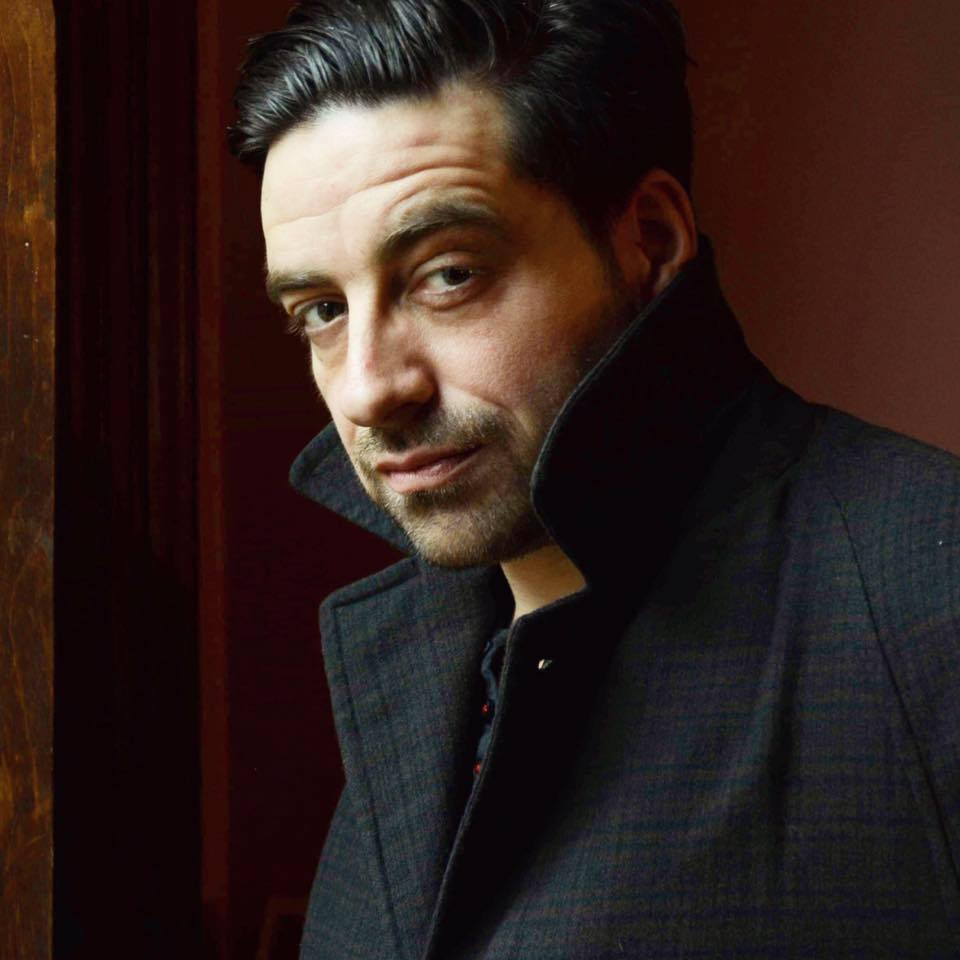
- Matt Roper in New York City, 2019
- Born: 20 May 1977 (age 49); Cheshire, England
- Notable work: Wilfredo The Greatest Show on Legs I'll Say She Is: The Lost Marx Brothers Musical

Comedy career
- Years active: 1997–present
- Medium: Character comedy, Alter egos, Stand up, Satire

Matt Roper (born May 20, 1977) is a British comedian, writer and musician.

== Career ==
Roper made his comedy debut in London during the late-1990s, working in sketch comedy at the Jermyn Street Theatre and in the satirical sketch show Newsrevue at the Canal Café Theatre.

He first gained prominence with his creation of Wilfredo, a grotesque satire of a romantic singer that has divided critics, leading them to proclaim him as "strangely endearing", "utterly charming and uplifting", "unlikeable", "inappropriate" and "a genius creation". The character is notoriously ill-mannered; frequently salivating onstage, drinking and smoking his way throughout songs, while berating his musicians and audience members with insults and expletives.

With Wilfredo and his band, Roper toured the British summer festival circuit, counting the Glastonbury Festival among his successes on several occasions. In July 2010 Wilfredo became the surprise hit of the Port Eliot Festival, appearing onstage with Jarvis Cocker. He has toured the character internationally, giving performances in Australia, Argentina, the Philippines, Iceland, South Africa, and across Europe and the United States.

In June 2011, Roper appeared in the first series of Rufus Hound's What's So Funny? for BBC Radio 7 (now BBC Radio 4 Extra), recorded the Christmas Day edition of The Comedy Club Interviews for the same channel later that year, in addition to making an appearance on Arthur Smith's Pissed Up Chat Show at the E4 Udderbelly at the Southbank Centre.

With comedian Pippa Evans, Roper co-wrote and recorded the song "Happy Goddamn Christmas", released in December 2012, peaking at No. 6 on the iTunes UK Comedy Charts. An accompanying video was released via BBC Three featuring cameos by Arthur Smith, Imran Yusuf, Ruth Bratt, and Thom Tuck. Also with Evans, he co-wrote and recorded the single "Peace All Over The World (At Christmas Time)", released 8 December 2014.

In September 2014, he joined the line-up of the surreal sketch comedy group The Greatest Show on Legs, debuting in Leipzig, Germany.

=== Edinburgh Festival Fringe ===
At the Edinburgh Festival Fringe, Roper has presented three feature length solo shows, Wilfredo: Erecto! (2011), The Wonderful World of Wilfredo (2012) and Wilfredo: Deconstructed (2014). Drawing positive comments and reviews in the press, Wilfredo was described by the Guardian newspaper as "weird, intimate and wonderful" and by Time Out as "an extraordinary creation who cuts a hacking, spluttering, beer dribbling figure upon the stage". The comedy industry website Chortle observed the character as "cantankerous, often lecherous and almost certainly consumptive, coughing and burping his way through the set, at one point hacking up phlegm like a horse chewing a toffee."

At the 2012 Edinburgh Festival, Roper appeared opposite Phil Nichol in a one-off performance at the Traverse Theatre for Theatre Uncut's season of radical playlets, playing an advertising executive representing a global corporation in Indulge by the Icelandic playwright Andri Snaer Magnuson.

In 2015, Roper accepted the Malcolm Hardee Award for Cunning Stunt of the Year, awarded to a group or individual annually for performing elaborate publicity stunts to promote their festival appearance. He had gained access to a social media account belonging to Kate Copstick, head comedy critic of the influential Scotsman newspaper, writing a glowing review of his talents under her name.

=== New York Theatre ===
On 14 April 2016, it was announced that Roper was to play Chico Marx, eldest of the Marx Brothers, in I'll Say She Is: The Lost Marx Brothers Musical, opening Off-Broadway at the Connelly Theater in New York City. The show opened on 28 May 2016 to acclaim in the New York press, winning the New York Times Critic's Pick. Adam Gopnik, profiling the show in the New Yorker, writes "Matt Roper, enlisted to play Chico, had to learn how to reproduce a fiendishly singular accent—not an Italian accent but a New York Italian-émigré accent as rendered in caricature by an émigré New York Jew—as well as how to play "trick" piano, in the distinctive Chico style, with the left-hand lolling and the right hand shooting the keys and kittening... he captures the strange, unearned belligerence of Chico."

On 6 December 2017 Roper opened off-Broadway in the comic/clown role of the first large-scale pantomime to be presented in New York for over a century, at the Playhouse Theater of the Henry Street Settlement. Adapted from the fairy tale of the same title by the British actor-musician Mat Fraser and directed by the performance artist Julie Atlas Muz, Jack and the Beanstalk also starred Dirty Martini and a cast of downtown performers. He has since appeared with the same company in two consecutive productions: Dick Rivington and The Cat, and The Sleeping Beauty.

Roper made his directorial debut with Ashley Blaker's stand-up comedy Goy Friendly, opening for three weeks Off-Broadway at New York's Soho Playhouse. Produced by Matt Lucas, the show opened 3 February 2020.

Roper makes appearances under the guise of characters at the Slipper Room, a variety theatre in Manhattan's Lower East Side.

== Politics ==
In November 2014, Roper was among 44 comedians to sign an open letter to Dapper Laughs published nationally in the UK's Independent newspaper, protesting "encouraging rape culture and normalising sexism" in an ITV2 series, which was subsequently cancelled. He is a member of the Save Soho movement, a collective of artists who oppose the ongoing closure and demolition of music venues and independent businesses within the London neighbourhood, adding his signature to a letter to Boris Johnson in 2014. Roper is a long-time supporter of the British Labour Party and many of its causes.

== Personal life ==
Roper lives in New York City. He is a son of the late British comedian George Roper. On his paternal side, Roper is a great-grandnephew of brothers Johnnie Cullen and George Sanford, two early 20th century stars of the British Music hall stage, and a great-nephew of the BBC wartime singer Jeannie Bradbury.

On his maternal side, Roper descends from the Groves family of actors and performers, which includes Martha Bigg (an actress of the Regency era), Fred Groves (a leading man in British silent films) and Walter Groves (a comedian with the Fred Karno Company).

The American writer Trav S.D., author of No Applause, Just Throw Money: The Book That Made Vaudeville Famous, describes the generational differences between father and son:

Matt Roper is a chameleon-like comic actor. He is a completely different character every time I ever see him perform. I first met him because he played Chico Marx in a revival of I'll Say She Is (and amusingly, it was a while before I ever heard his real voice)... In Androboros he played a callous British aristocrat. In Jack and the Beanstalk he was a wide-eyed, accessible little boy. By contrast, George Roper's only persona was himself. He didn't act or play roles, apart from brief moments in his jokes when he would do a character. The common denominator of course is show business. People in show business are more like other people in show business than they are like people outside of it, no matter what their act. One can be a lion tamer and the other a tuba player — it's still a life of constant travel, living from gig to gig, craving attention, and pleasing roomfuls of strangers. I say it is a noble calling. May there be generations of funny Ropers for all eternity.

== Theatre ==
Date	Title	Role	Venue/Location
2024	Groucho: A Life in Revue	Harpo Marx / Chico Marx	Walnut Street Theatre, Philadelphia, PA
2023	Sleeping Beauty	Prince Charming	Off-Broadway: The Playhouse, Abrons Arts Center, New York, NY
2022	Dick Rivington and the Cat	Mitch	Off-Broadway: The Playhouse, Abrons Arts Center, New York, NY
2022	Wilfredo's One Night Stand	Wilfredo	Sideshow Theater, Coney Island USA, Brooklyn, NY
2020	Goy Friendly	Director	Off-Broadway: Soho Playhouse, New York, NY
2019	The Best of Bindlestiff Family Cirkus	Self	Lincoln Center, New York, NY
2018	Jack and the Beanstalk	Simon	Off-Broadway: The Playhouse, Abrons Arts Center, New York, NY
2018	Not-Knowing	Chuck	3 Legged Dog, New York, NY
2018	The Cocoanuts	Chico	Culbreth Theater, Heritage Theatre Festival, University of Virginia
2018	Tainted Cabaret	Emcee	US National Tour
2017	Jack and the Beanstalk	Simon	Off-Broadway: The Playhouse, Abrons Arts Center, New York, NY
2016	I'll Say She Is: The Lost Marx Brothers Musical	Chico	Off-Broadway: Connelly Theater, New York, NY
2015	Routines	Self	Edinburgh Festival Fringe
2014	Wilfredo: Deconstructed	Wilfredo	Edinburgh Festival Fringe
2013	Cape Town Funny Festival	Wilfredo	Baxter Theatre, University of Cape Town, South Africa
2012	Indulge	Geir	Traverse Theatre, Edinburgh
2012	The Wonderful World of Wilfredo	Wilfredo	Edinburgh Festival Fringe
2012	CircusFest	Wilfredo	The Roundhouse, Camden Town, London
2011	Wilfredo: Erecto!	Wilfredo	Edinburgh Festival Fringe
2011	Lucifer: My Part in the New Labour Project (and How I Invented Coalition Government)	The Devil	Brighton Komedia, United Kingdom

== Discography ==
- Giraffes on Horseback Salad (Original Soundtrack) – Quin Arbeitman (album, 2019)
- Wilfredo Unchained: Live in California - Wilfredo (album, 2015)
- Peace All Over the World (At Christmas Time) - Wilfredo feat. the Great Carmella (single, 2014)
- The Wonderful World of Wilfredo - Wilfredo (album, 2014)
- Happy Goddamn Christmas - Loretta Maine feat. Matt Roper (single, 2012)
