= Pedley =

Pedley may refer to:

== People ==
- Arthur Pedley (1859–1943), British civil servant
- Byron Pedley (1844–1910), British stage comedian and actor
- Eric Leader Pedley (1896–1986), American polo player
- Ethel Pedley (1859–1898), Australian author and musician
- Jack Pedley (1882–1952), English footballer
- Leslie Pedley (1930–2018), Australian botanist
- Nicholas Pedley (1615–1685), English politician
- Philip Pedley, British Conservative activist politician
- Robin Pedley (1914–1988), English educationist and comprehensive school pioneer
- Stephen Pedley (1940-2026), British Anglican bishop
- Sue Pedley (born 1954), Australian multimedia artist
- Tim Pedley (born 1942), British mathematician
- William Pedley (1858–1920), British civil engineer and cricketer

== Places ==
- Pedley, Alberta, a location in Yellowhead County, Canada
- Pedley, California
  - Pedley station
- Pedley Hills, California
