= My Summer with Des =

- Genre: Football; Comedy; Drama
- Screenplay by: Arthur Smith
- Directed by: Simon Curtis
- Starring: Neil Morrissey; Rachel Weisz; Des Lynam; Arabella Weir; John Gordon Sinclair
- Music by: Jim Parker
- Country of origin: United Kingdom
- Original language: English

Production
- Executive producer: Jane Tranter
- Producer: Joy Spink
- Cinematography: Graham Frake
- Editor: Philip Kloss
- Running time: 80 mins.
- Production company: BBC Films

Original release
- Network: BBC One
- Release: 25 May 1998

Related
- Match of the Day

My Summer with Des is a 1998 comedy drama television film, written by Arthur Smith, and directed by Simon Curtis. Broadcast to coincide with the beginning of World Cup 1998, the story is set during the European football championships in 1996, where football fan Martin finds his life is going from bad to worse after losing his job and splitting up with his girlfriend. It starred Neil Morrissey and Des Lynam, with Rachel Weisz playing the role of his love interest who seems to have the ability to travel through time and know the outcome of the tournament's matches before they happen. At one point Neil Morrissey's character asks her to take him straight to the semi-final between England and Germany, which they then arrive at in the next scene.

The film was broadcast on BBC One on 25 May 1998, and released on VHS on 26 May 1998.

A DVD was scheduled for a 4 August 2008 release, however this was postponed.

== Cast ==
- Neil Morrissey as Martin
- Rachel Weisz as Rosie
- Des Lynam as himself
- John Gordon Sinclair as Cameron
- Arabella Weir as Barbara
- Graeme Garden as Angus
- Tilly Blackwood as Anna
- Kevin Chapman (Lollujo) as Football Fan
- Jazzy Jeff as Lead football fan

=== Cameos by football stars ===
- David Seaman
- Peter Shilton

== See also ==
- An Evening with Gary Lineker
