= Cullen and Carthy =

Comedy double act

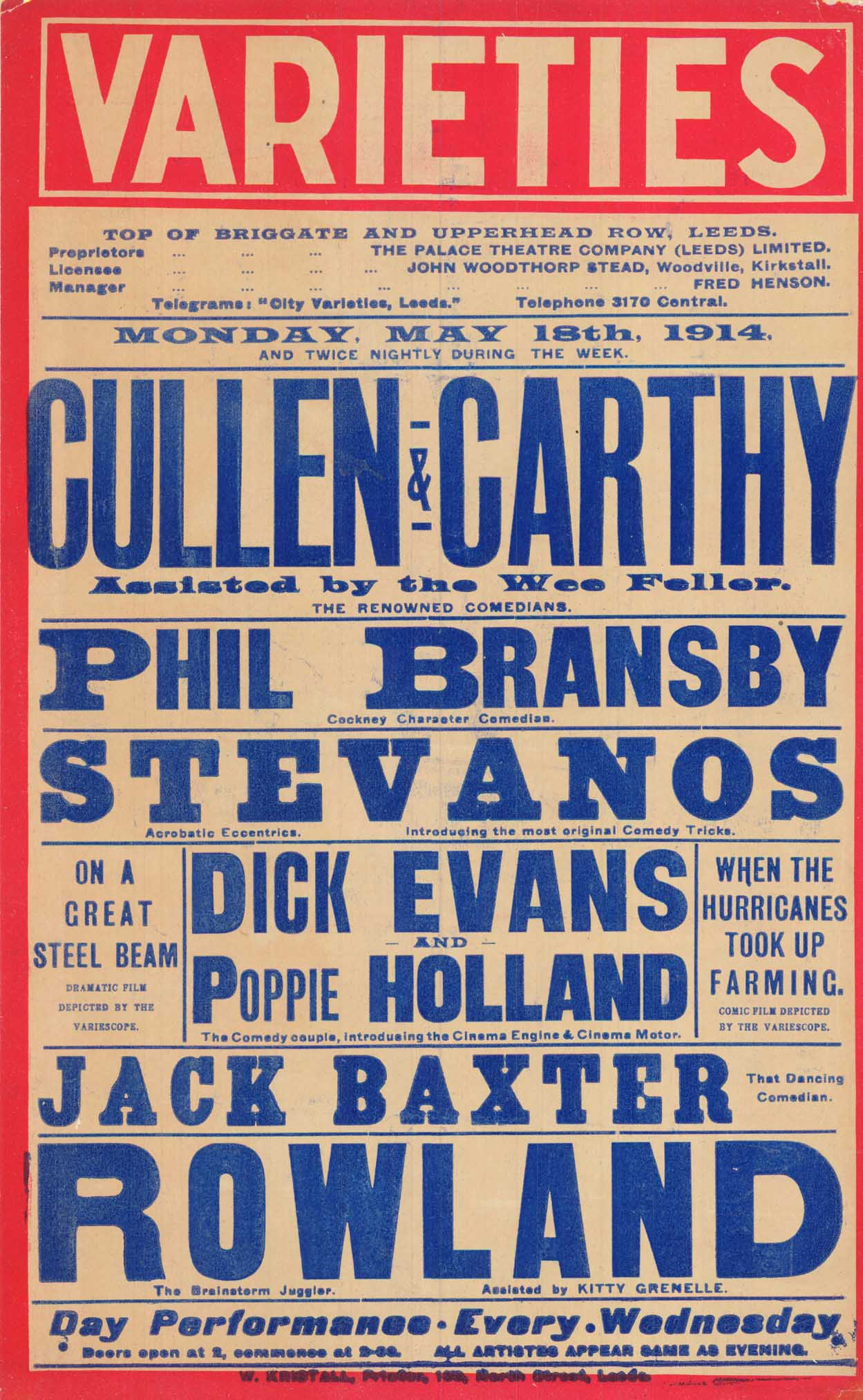
- Poster advertising the appearance of Cullen and Carthy at the City Varieties Theatre, Leeds, in 1914.

Comedy career
- Years active: 1890–1928
- Medium: Music hall, variety, circus
- Genres: comedy, musical comedy, dance

Johnnie Cullen (12 July 1868 – 16 July 1929) and Arthur Carthy (21 Jan 1869 – 18 December 1943), known as Cullen and Carthy, were a British comedy double act who achieved popularity on the British and Irish music hall, circus and variety stages over a career spanning a period of four decades, beginning in the latter part of the Victorian age to the post-war years of the 1920's. Their partnership lasted from 1890 until Cullen's death.

The height of their success saw appearances on variety bills alongside Marie Lloyd, Little Tich Vesta Tilley, Dan Leno and W. C. Fields, in addition to consecutive seasons of pantomime at Bristol's Theatre Royal (today the Bristol Old Vic) and in London's West End.

== Family backgrounds and early life ==
Johnnie Cullen was born John James Bradbury in the city of Liverpool to musician Robert Henry Bradbury and Susannah Bell in the predominantly Irish Catholic neighbourhood of Everton. A younger brother, George Henry Bradbury (1869 – 1950), also performed under the name of George Sanford as one half of the comedy and dance act Sanford and Lyons. The early death of their father in 1870 left their mother widowed with two infant sons at the relatively young age of twenty-seven. Susannah remarried to Joseph Roper in 1872, giving birth to a further five children. Such was the popularity of the two brothers in the Music Halls, that upon their mother's death in 1908, various national newspapers published memoriam reports.

Arthur Carthy was born Arthur Daniel Ewing in Birkenhead to John and Margaret Ewing and a family of Scottish origin. Like Cullen, Carthy's father also died young, leaving a widow and five children. The Ewings moved across the River Mersey to Liverpool where Margaret ran a public house and re-married carpenter Robert Lowe.

Cullen and Carthy met while working together as "Echo boys" in the machinery room of the newspaper printers for the Liverpool Echo, where eventually they found themselves fired for singing and dancing for the amusement of their co-workers.

== Career ==
Early billing for the pair saw them advertised as eccentric dancers, burlesque comedians and knockabout (slapstick) comedians. Cullen played a version of the traditional clown, dishevelled and downtrodden—in this case an early precursor of Charlie Chaplin's Tramp persona—while Carthy performed the role of the Harlequinade in upper class attire of top hat and morning dress.

The earliest known recorded documentation of the pair appears in The Era (19 July 1890), to publicise a series of appearances at the Grand Circus and Theatre in St. Helens, with billing as "the Daisies from Ireland". Other early appearances include performances at the Liverpool Haymarket Music Hall, the Star Music Hall, Manchester People's Concert Hall and the National Theatre of Varieties in Dublin.

Throughout 1892 and into 1893 they toured the United Kingdom giving performances between scene changes in 'J. K. Hamilton's Diorama of the World' show — a popular late Victorian version of virtual reality.

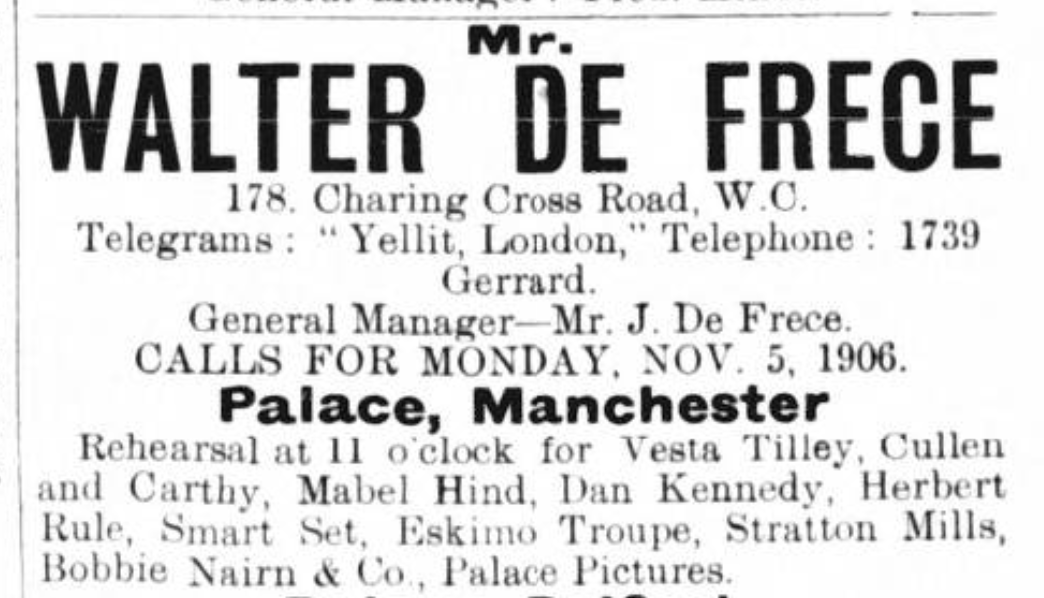
Rehearsal call in the theatrical trade newspaper The Entr'acte by Walter de Frece for artists due to appear at the Palace Theatre, Manchester in November 1906

In addition to their work in the Music Halls, they appeared to great success in the legitimate theatres in pantomime, as popular comedians who also performed the harlequinade, making their debut at Liverpool's Shakespeare Theatre of Varieties in Aladdin (1891). They achieved a career breakthrough when they performed as Clown and Pantaloon in Red Riding Hood at Bristol's Theatre Royal (1894) where they were immediately re-engaged to return for the following pantomime season in Dick Whittington (1895). For the next 25 years, they made annual appearances in pantomimes including The Enchanted Mountain (St. James Theatre, Manchester 1897), Babes in the Wood (St. James Theatre, Manchester 1898), Robinson Crusoe (Alexandra Theatre, Sheffield 1901), Aladdin and His Lamp (Palace Theatre, Newcastle 1905), Red Riding Hood (Queens Theatre, Dublin 1910), Sinbad (Theatre Royal, Edinburgh 1912), Babes In The Wood (Empire Theatre, Dublin 1916), Old King Cole (His Majesty's Theatre, Dundee 1917) and Cinderella (Pavilion Theatre, Liverpool 1926). In 1913 they appeared twice-nightly onstage in The Forty Thieves at the 3,000 seater Grand Opera House in Middlesbrough, making a sensational entrance on the back of an enormous camel.

Cullen and Carthy are said to have invented several traditional pantomime gags and routines, many of which have been passed down through the generations. One reporter said of the duo: "They're funny, clever, and popular, and they know the game from end to end. If you meet 'em, ask them about what became of the gag about the cough that carries you off".

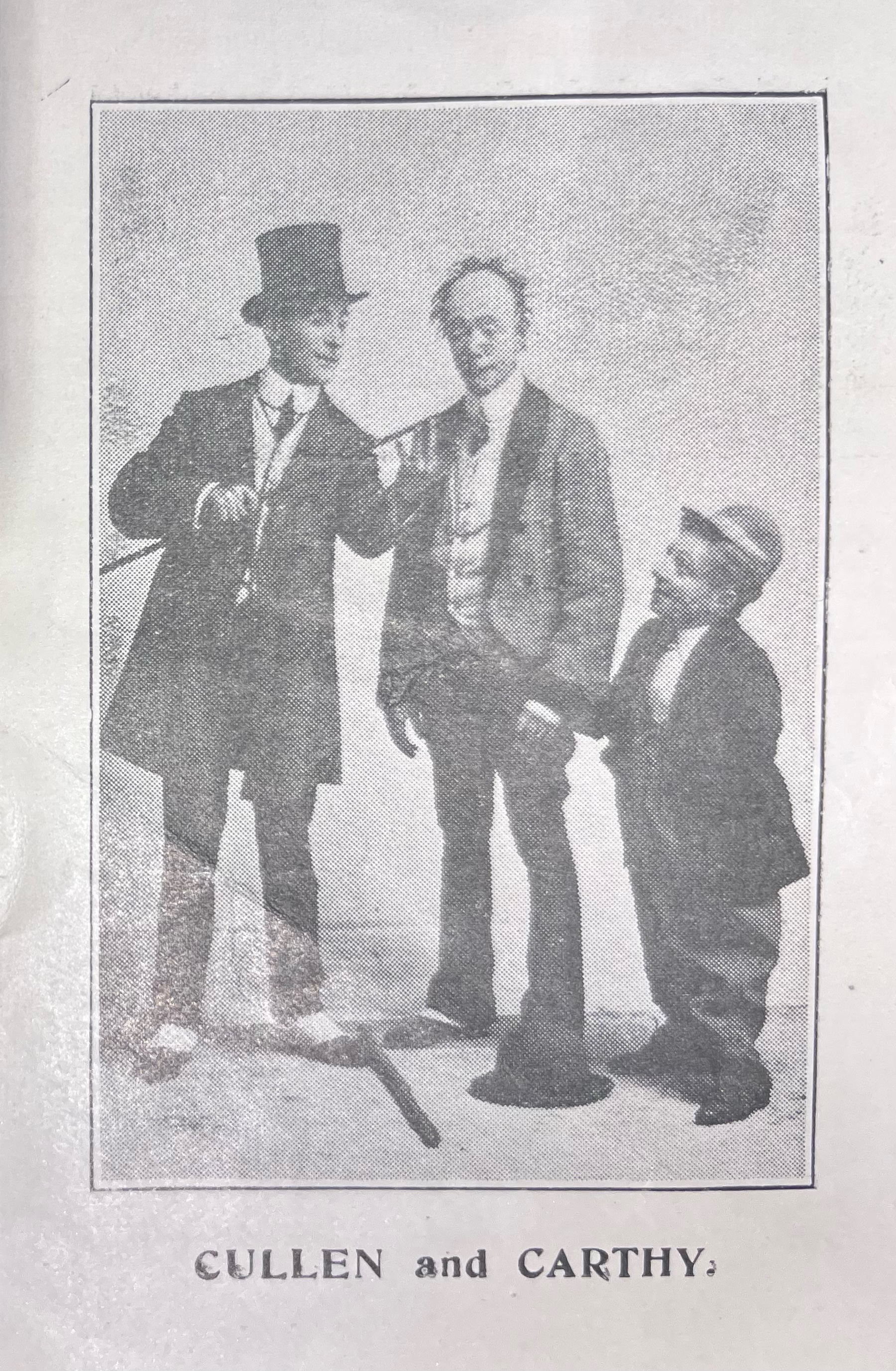
Cullen and Carthy appearing at London's Lyceum Theatre in 1919, assisted by the Wee Feller.

From 1904 onwards they expanded their Music Hall act into a trio with the addition of the sideshow performer Harry Cluley, who was styled over the years as ‘Little Cluley', 'Little Alfie’, ‘The Wee Chap’, ‘The Wee Assistant’, ‘The Wee Feller’ and ‘The Diminutive Assistant’.

In 1919, Cullen and Carthy appeared at the Lyceum Theatre in the Strand for a season of Dick Whittington with George Bass, Mabel Lait, Daley Cooper and Edith Drayson. The extravagant production featured a cast of over a hundred performers, ballet dancers, circus acrobats and marionettes. The press proclaimed the duo as "second to none in the knockabout business" and lauded the duo's indulgence in "simultaneous backchat" in "as refined, artistic, beautiful, and pleasing a pantomime than has been witnessed for several seasons at that historic house".

For three years beginning in 1923, Cullen and Carthy toured the United Kingdom and Ireland in Wheel 'Em In, a nostalgia show featuring a bill of top-line performers from the heyday of Northern Music Hall.

== Death, legacy and descendants ==
Johnnie Cullen died 16 July 1929 aged 62 in Manchester. His descendants include his son—a comedy performer and producer named Johnny Cullen (died 16 December 1958), a niece named Jessie "Jeannie" Bradbury (1917—1967) — a BBC radio singer married to Welsh bandleader Harry Parry, a great-nephew George Roper (1934—2003) who achieved national recognition as a stand-up comedian on British television during the 1970s and 1980s, and a son of the latter, Matt Roper (1977—) achieving note as a theatre and variety performer, today living in New York City. Arthur Carthy's son Arthur E. Ewing, known professionally as Arthur Carthy Jr. (1893—1958) became an occasional songwriting partner of Albert Whelan, and co-wrote songs for the comedian Sam Mayo.

== Further Resources ==
An ink and wash caricature of Cullen and Carthy, one of 74 among an album of caricatures drawn by George Cooke showing variety entertainers who appeared at Blackpool's Palace Theatre, is held in the archives of the Victoria and Albert Museum.
