= George Roper =

English comedian (1934–2003)

- Born: George Francis Furnival; 15 May 1934; Liverpool, Lancashire, England
- Died: 1 July 2003 (aged 69); Sandbach, Cheshire, England
- Notable work: The Comedians

Comedy career
- Years active: Early 1960s – 2003
- Medium: Comedy

George Francis Roper (born Furnival; 15 May 1934 – 1 July 2003) was an English comedian, best known for his appearances in the long-running UK television series The Comedians.

== Early history ==
Roper was born in Liverpool to a working-class family of Irish descent, to parents who were devout Roman Catholic. In conversation with the writer Ken Irwin in 1972, he remarked that "the rough and ready upbringing of Catholics in Liverpool brings out the humour in a family":

He's another comic who has known poverty. There were five children in the Roper family, three girls and two boys. Dad saw a lot of life – he was a window cleaner. 'Times were hard when I started at school, in the early war years,' says George. 'We never went without, but a jam butty was often a meal'.

Two of Roper's great-uncles were popular stars of the British Music Hall: Johnnie Cullen of the comedy team Cullen and Carthy, and George Sanford of the dance act Sanford and Lyons. He was also a cousin to the British jazz singer Jeannie Bradbury.

He left school at the age of fifteen to join the Merchant Navy as a galley boy, then as steward. Later he served his national service in the Royal Air Force (RAF), based in Eindhoven in the Netherlands. It was during this period in the Netherlands that Roper began to sing with big bands at RAF concert parties.

He married Linda Groves in December 1968, and they had three children: Nicholas, Louise and Matthew.

== Career ==
One of the most startling things about him was his resemblance to the great 1990s American comedian Bill Hicks. Like Hicks, Roper was predominantly concerned with the metaphysical futility of daily existence, only in his case, he maybe didn't realise it.

— Tony Hannan in A History of Northern Comedy

Working mainly in the North West England region, Roper began to sing semi-professionally in clubs and hotels during the early 1960s while supporting himself in various jobs, but soon found his real talent lay in performing comedy. He was encouraged by the music hall comedian Sandy Powell. In his stage act the number of songs soon constricted and the gags expanded.

By 1965, with his portly figure, bejewelled fingers, deadpan style and a laid back microphone technique he began to draw sizeable audiences as a stand-up comic on the booming club and casino scene of Manchester. Regular at Manchester's Cabaret Club were the young reporter Michael Parkinson and Johnnie Hamp, a producer from Granada Television, who said of Roper, "When I had the idea for The Comedians, he was one of the first people I called. It wasn't necessarily the gags he told, it was the face. There was always a twinkle in the eye."

Hamp was on the look-out for new acts for a new show, which was to become The Comedians, a groundbreaking television series which ran intermittently between 1971 and 1993. Filmed in Manchester before a live audience, the programme consisted mainly of Northern club comedians telling jokes. It was a major success at the time, garnering several industry awards and a BAFTA nomination, though the jokes told often contained racist or sexist stereotypes. This was acceptable on British TV during the 1970s but would not be acceptable today. Nevertheless, the show stands as a major social document of the era.

With his off-beat and sometimes surreal humour, Roper was an oddity in the series. His jokes were clean, inoffensive and were usually centred on "wellies" (wellington boots). Everyone wore "wellies" in Roper's jokes.

— The Times – 10 July 2003

In June 1971 he was one of a group of artists invited to perform in a televised Royal Gala Performance at the Empire Theatre, Liverpool in the presence of the Queen. The show featured only Liverpool-born performers and marked the opening of the Mersey Tunnel. George Roper later made a number of notable television appearances including The Wheeltappers and Shunters Social Club, Celebrity Squares, At Long Last, This and The Grumbleweeds. In 1980 he performed on the experimental comedy show Here Comes Channel 8 (taking a look into the future of television, set in 1999) alongside Spike Milligan, Rula Lenska and Michael Bentine. He was also a regular comic performer on the ITV gameshow 3-2-1. His work for the BBC in radio comedy included appearances on The Frankie Howerd Variety Show, Windsor Davies Presents, The Arthur Askey Show, the panel show Wit's End for BBC Radio 2 and You've Got To Be Joking for BBC Radio 4. By the 1990s, comic tastes in the UK had changed quite radically, and many variety performers who filled the television schedules often found work difficult to come by. Roper was still in demand in clubs and in summer shows. He could also be seen as a contributor to documentaries including Heroes of Comedy. He appeared regularly in the Spanish resort of Benidorm, sharing the headline spot at the Talk of the Town with jazz musician Eric Delaney. He frequently performed for expatriates in Hong Kong and the Middle East. He also toured Australia several times, where The Comedians made him a star.

== Death ==
George Roper died of cancer in 2003 at the age of 69. The previous year had seen him reunited with his co-stars from The Comedians for a long season at the Opera House, Blackpool. His final stage appearance was at the Liverpool Empire in May 2003. His funeral was attended by many figures from the world of comedy and sport, including Ricky Tomlinson, Ken Dodd, Frank Worthington, Tommy Docherty and all of his contemporaries from The Comedians.
