= Chris England =

English writer and actor

Chris England (born 20 January 1961) is an English writer and actor. He is best known for the comedy play An Evening with Gary Lineker, which he wrote with Arthur Smith, and the book Balham to Bollywood.

== Early life ==
Chris England was educated at Valley Comprehensive School, Worksop, Nottinghamshire, and at Pembroke College, Cambridge. While at Cambridge he was a member of the Footlights, and toured the UK and Australia with them.

Chris is a supporter of Oldham Athletic and has talked about the club previously on his podcast which he named after the Boundary Park pitch.

== Career ==
After graduating, England formed Bad Lib Theatre Company with fellow ex-Footlights Morwenna Banks, Robert Harley, Neil Mullarkey, Paul Simpkin and David Tyler, co-writing, performing and directing a number of comedy plays and shows. These included Feeling The Benefit, Get Your Coat, Dear, We’re Leaving..., The Preventers and The Return of the New Preventers. The latter two shows subsequently formed part of the BBC radio series Fab TV, and a one-off comedy, The Preventers, for ITV.

With Morwenna Banks, England co-wrote and appeared in two children's television storytelling series, Revolting Animals and Jellyneck, and devised and wrote All Change, which featured Frankie Howerd, Maggie Steed and Tony Haygarth.

In 1991, England co-wrote (with Arthur Smith) and acted in An Evening With Gary Lineker, which transferred from the Edinburgh Fringe to the Duchess Theatre in the West End, and was nominated for an Olivier Award for Comedy of the Year. The play was made into a television film by Granada, produced by Andy Harries, and starring Clive Owen, Caroline Quentin and Martin Clunes. This led to further television writing, including an episode of Murder Most Horrid, the sitcom Blind Men, and the comedy drama Bostock's Cup.

In 2000, England spent twelve weeks in Bhuj, India, working on the Oscar-nominated Bollywood cricket epic Lagaan, in which he played a "heavily-bewhiskered bodyline bowler", an experience which he described in a best-selling book, Balham to Bollywood, a BBC Radio 4 Book of the Week.

England returned to theatre writing and acting in 2006 with Breakfast With Jonny Wilkinson, which enjoyed runs at the Edinburgh Fringe and at the Menier Chocolate Factory. The play has been made into a feature film, released in 2013, starring George MacKay, Norman Pace, Nigel Lindsay, Beth Cordingly, Michael Beckley, Gina Varela and the author.

England has also collaborated with the comedian Al Murray on three series of Al Murray's Happy Hour, one series of Al Murray's Multiple Personality Disorder, and two comedy books, as well as the BBC Radio 5 Live show 7 Day Sunday, which Murray hosted.

He has completed a trilogy of historical novels set in the years leading up to and during the First World War. The Fun Factory is set in the world of the Edwardian music hall, when the young Charlie Chaplin and Stan Laurel were working for the Fred Karno comedy company along with the novels' narrator Arthur Dandoe. The Boxcar of Fun follows the same characters into the golden heyday of American vaudeville, while the third volume, Chaplinoia, sees them breaking into the silent movies.

His play, Twitstorm, had its world premiere at the Park Theatre in May 2017. His latest play, Eh Up Me Old Flowers!, about the 1970s comedian Charlie Williams, appeared at the 2022 Edinburgh Fringe.

He co-hosts, with Nick Hancock, the football-comedy-chat podcast The Famous Sloping Pitch, and its football-nostalgia spin off The Famous Sloping Pitch: Back Pass.

=== Books ===
On The Game - Old Street. ISBN 978-1-910400-74-6

Twitstorm - Josef Weinberger plays. ISBN 978-0-85676-371-7

Chaplinoia - Old Street. ISBN 978-1-910400-71-5

The Boxcar of Fun - Old Street. ISBN 978-1-910400-27-2

The Fun Factory - Old Street. ISBN 978-1-908699-86-2

How to Enjoy the World Cup - Old Street. ISBN 978-1-908699-91-6

Breakfast With Jonny Wilkinson - Josef Weinberger plays. ISBN 0856762962

No More Buddha, Only Football - Hodder and Stoughton. ISBN 0340825480

Balham to Bollywood - Hodder and Stoughton. ISBN 034081988X

What Didn’t Happen Next (with Nick Hancock) - Andre Deutsch. ISBN 023399291X

An Evening with Gary Lineker (with Arthur Smith) - Josef Weinberger plays. ISBN 085676129X

=== Film ===
Breakfast with Jonny Wilkinson

Bose - The Forgotten Hero

Lagaan, in the role of Yardley, a fast bowler.

A Man Called Sarge

=== Television ===
Al Murray's Multiple Personality Disorder

Al Murray's Happy Hour

Bostock's Cup

Blind Men

The Preventers

An Evening with Gary Lineker

Dare to Believe- series 1 and 2 ITV

=== Radio ===
7 Day Sunday

The Back End of Next Week

Fab TV

Room 101
