= Frisky & Mannish =

British musical comedy double act

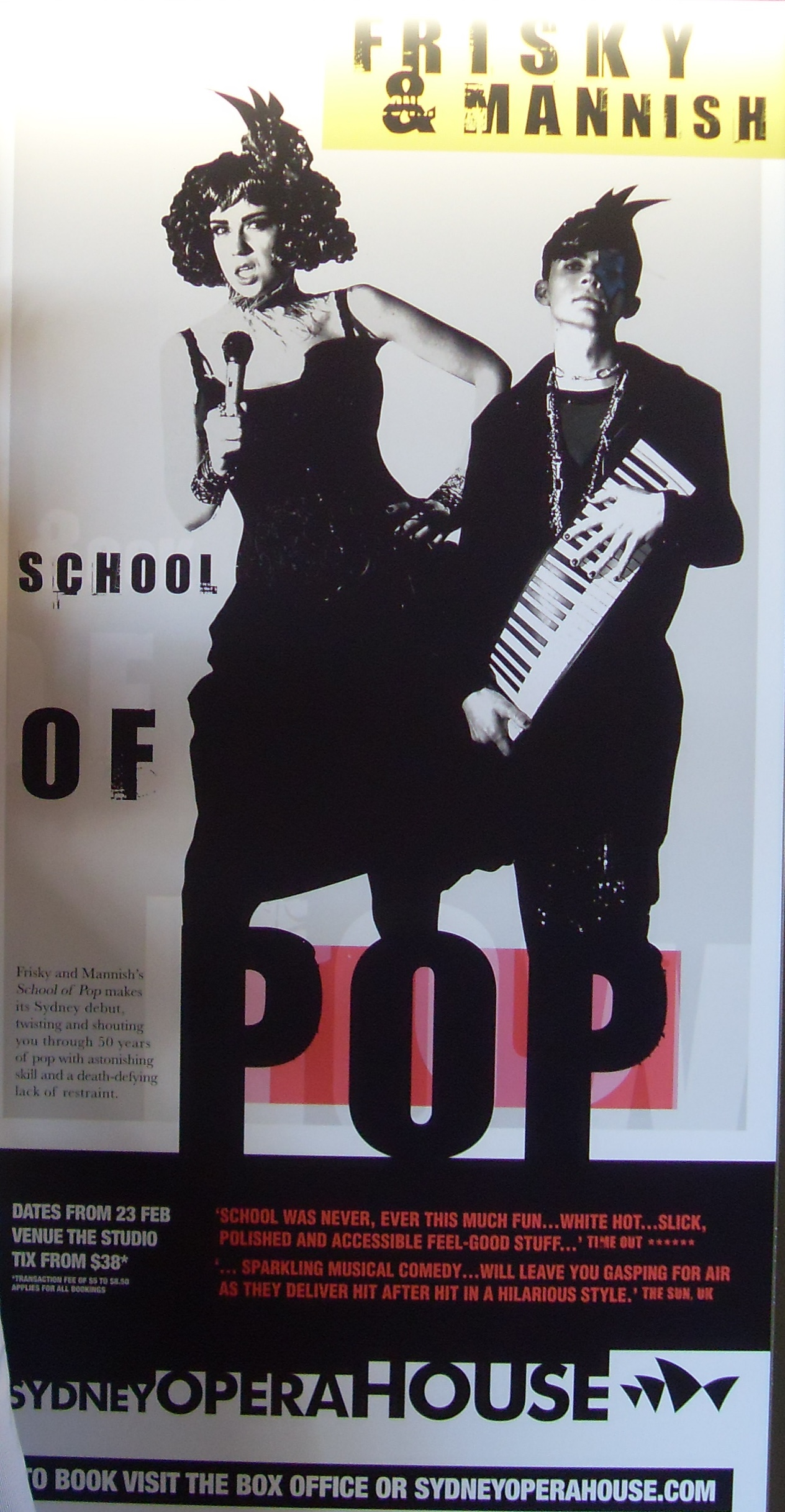

Background information
- Origin: London, England
- Genres: Cabaret, Comedy, Parody music, Pastiche, Pop music, Popular culture
- Years active: 2008–present
- Members: Laura Corcoran, Frisky; Matthew Floyd Jones, Mannish
- Website: friskyandmannish.uk

Frisky & Mannish is a British musical comedy double act, created and performed by singer Laura Corcoran and pianist-singer Matthew Floyd Jones. Known for their pop music parodies, the duo have toured the fringe festival and comedy festival circuits in the United Kingdom and Australia, and appeared on a number of British television and radio programmes.

The act's name derives from two incidental characters mentioned in one couplet of Byron's Don Juan: "Lady Fitz-Frisky, and Miss Maevia Mannish, / Both longed extremely to be sung in Spanish" (Canto XI, LIII.)

== Background ==
Jones was born in south-west London and brought up in Surrey, whilst Corcoran hails from Greater Manchester. They first met as undergraduates at Oxford University and began a partnership writing comic songs for the student sketch troupe The Oxford Revue. After graduating, they moved into a shared flat in London.

On 5 March 2008, at a music hall-themed fundraiser on a barge in Battersea, Corcoran and Jones decided to "mess around with a few songs," and performed pastiches of "Papa Don't Preach" (as an operatic aria), "Eye of the Tiger" (in a bluegrass style), "I'd Do Anything for Love" (sung by a young child), and "Come On Eileen" (as a heartfelt ballad.) Their performance led to a "firm booking for an hour-long show," after which the pair developed a fuller concept and "reverse-engineered some sort of coherent act into existence."

== Career ==
=== Stage ===
Frisky & Mannish have written, produced and performed nine shows to date, all of which have toured internationally, and a Christmas-themed show that has been presented at the West End’s Lyric Theatre and Edinburgh's Hogmanay. They have headlined a number of London venues, including Shepherd's Bush Empire, Noël Coward Theatre, Soho Theatre, Southbank Centre, The Forum, Bloomsbury Theatre, and KOKO. In Australia, they have performed at the Sydney Opera House and Sydney Cabaret Festival, Adelaide Cabaret Festival and Adelaide Fringe, Melbourne International Comedy Festival, and Fringe World in Perth. They have also toured to New Zealand (Auckland and Wellington), Europe (Berlin and Dublin), Asia (Hong Kong and Singapore), and New York City's The Slipper Room.

Their first full-length show, School of Pop (2009), a series of "educational" lessons developed during their monthly residency at Leicester Square Theatre, was described as "the undisputed hit of the Edinburgh Fringe," garnering thirteen five-star reviews from publications such as Chortle, Edinburgh Evening News, The Herald and Time Out. Their send-up of Noël Coward and Lily Allen was particularly praised. Kate Nash, whose song "Foundations" they combined with Kate Bush's "Wuthering Heights", attended one of their performances. At the end of the year The Independent featured Frisky & Mannish in a special "Talent 2010" issue as up-and-coming comedians, alongside other rising stars including footballer Jack Wilshere, actress Imogen Poots, politician Nick Boles, musician Eliot Sumner and broadcaster Tulip Mazumdar.

A sequel entitled The College Years (2010), based around a central thesis of "collision theory," premièred at Latitude Festival, and placed second (out of 2453 productions) on Edinburgh Festival Guide's list of top-rated shows. Pop Centre Plus (2011), the final instalment in their "Pop Education" trilogy, was launched at the udderBELLY Festival on South Bank, structured as a careers advice facility. In 2012 they introduced two new shows, Extra-Curricular Activities, and a black comedy called 27 Club, which delved into the eponymous cultural phenomenon. Just Too Much (2014) continued this darker theme, concerning itself with meltdowns in pop. In 2015, inspired by the reaction to their viral short film protesting comments made by Gary Barlow on The X Factor," they created a variety show, Cabariot, featuring guest acts and original songs tackling a range of social issues. After a short hiatus, the pair returned with a tenth anniversary show, PopLab (2019), comprising a series of scientific experiments, and a post-pandemic live-digital hybrid show, PopCorn (2021), inspired by film scores.

Despite originating and developing the act in cabaret, circus and variety shows, Frisky & Mannish have managed to establish themselves in stand-up comedy, regularly featured as the musical act on lineups of comedians such as Katherine Ryan, Simon Brodkin, Joel Dommett, Josh Widdicombe, Hannibal Buress, Josie Long, Tom Allen, Margaret Cho, Tim Minchin, Seann Walsh, Richard Herring, Stewart Lee, Aisling Bea, Sara Pascoe, Russell Howard, Rose Matafeo, and Frank Skinner.

=== Radio ===
In March 2011, Scott Mills featured a number of Frisky & Mannish songs on BBC Radio 1, which led to several live interviews and performances on the programme, and to the writing and recording of "Perfect Christmas Single" (with Mills and co-host Chris Stark) for a Radio 1 Stories documentary in December 2012. They also performed a set during the BBC New Comedy Awards Final 2012 at the Grand Theatre, Blackpool, hosted by Patrick Kielty and broadcast on BBC Radio 2.

Their other radio appearances have included BBC Radio 1 (Matt Edmondson), BBC Radio 2 (Jo Whiley), BBC Radio 3 (The Verb), BBC Radio 4 (Sketchorama), BBC Radio 5 Live, BBC 6 Music (Lauren Laverne), and BBC Radio Scotland (MacAulay and Co).

=== Television ===
In August 2011, Frisky & Mannish were featured on BBC Two's The Culture Show, performing a comic song about the art of making comic songs with contributions from Adam Kay and Isy Suttie. They also appeared on children's comedy programme Dick and Dom's Funny Business (BBC Two) with Warwick Davis, and variety show Comedy at the Fringe (BBC3) alongside Joe Lycett and Elis James.

On the fifth series of Britain's Got Talent in 2011, contestant Edward Reid's performance of nursery rhymes to the tune of Leona Lewis's "Run" was accused of plagiarising Frisky & Mannish's "Wheels on the Bus," a nursery rhyme medley set to Girls Aloud's "Sound of the Underground".

== Reception ==
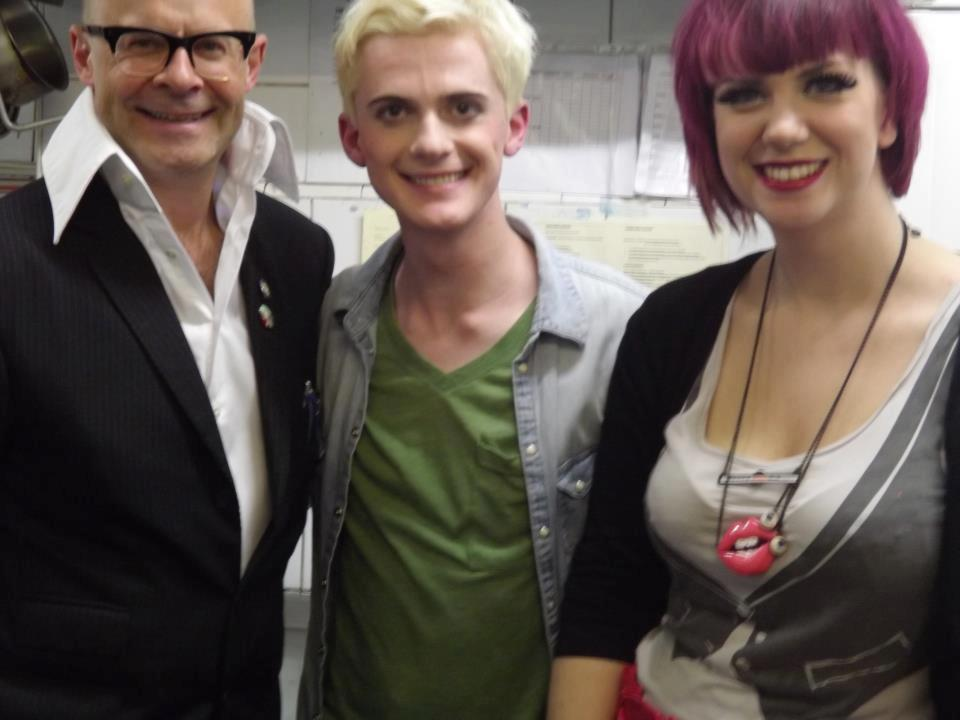
Jones and Corcoran with Harry Hill

Frisky & Mannish have been called "the mad scientists of pop," performing "shrewdly crafted, expertly delivered and rapturously received observations" with "the tenacity of a Rottweiler and the charm of a Disney prince." They have been positively reviewed in a number of publications such as The Daily Telegraph, The Evening Standard, The Guardian, The Independent, Metro, The Observer, and The West Australian, although several reviewers have confessed to finding the act difficult to describe. One publication referred to them as the "King and Queen of the Fringe Festival." They have been acclaimed for the skill with which they perform and the cleverness of their observations, whereas negative criticism of their act has tended to focus upon a perceived lack of depth to their material.

In 2011 The Guardian identified Frisky & Mannish as a rare example of a successful mixed-gender comedy duo. Other comedians who have expressed admiration for the act include Shaparak Khorsandi, Ruby Wax, Ed Byrne, Dara Ó Briain, Susan Calman, and Sarah Millican.

== Awards ==
Frisky & Mannish won an Editor's Choice Award at Brighton Fringe, a Best Comedy Award at Adelaide Fringe, and an Entertainmentwise Award at Edinburgh Festival Fringe. They were runners-up in the final of Hackney Empire New Act of the Year, finalists in the Musical Comedy Awards, and nominees for a Chortle Award (Best Music or Variety Act), Loaded LAFTA Award (Best Newcomer), two Fringe World Awards, and four London Cabaret Awards.
