= Charles Groves (actor) =

Comedy actor (1843–1909)

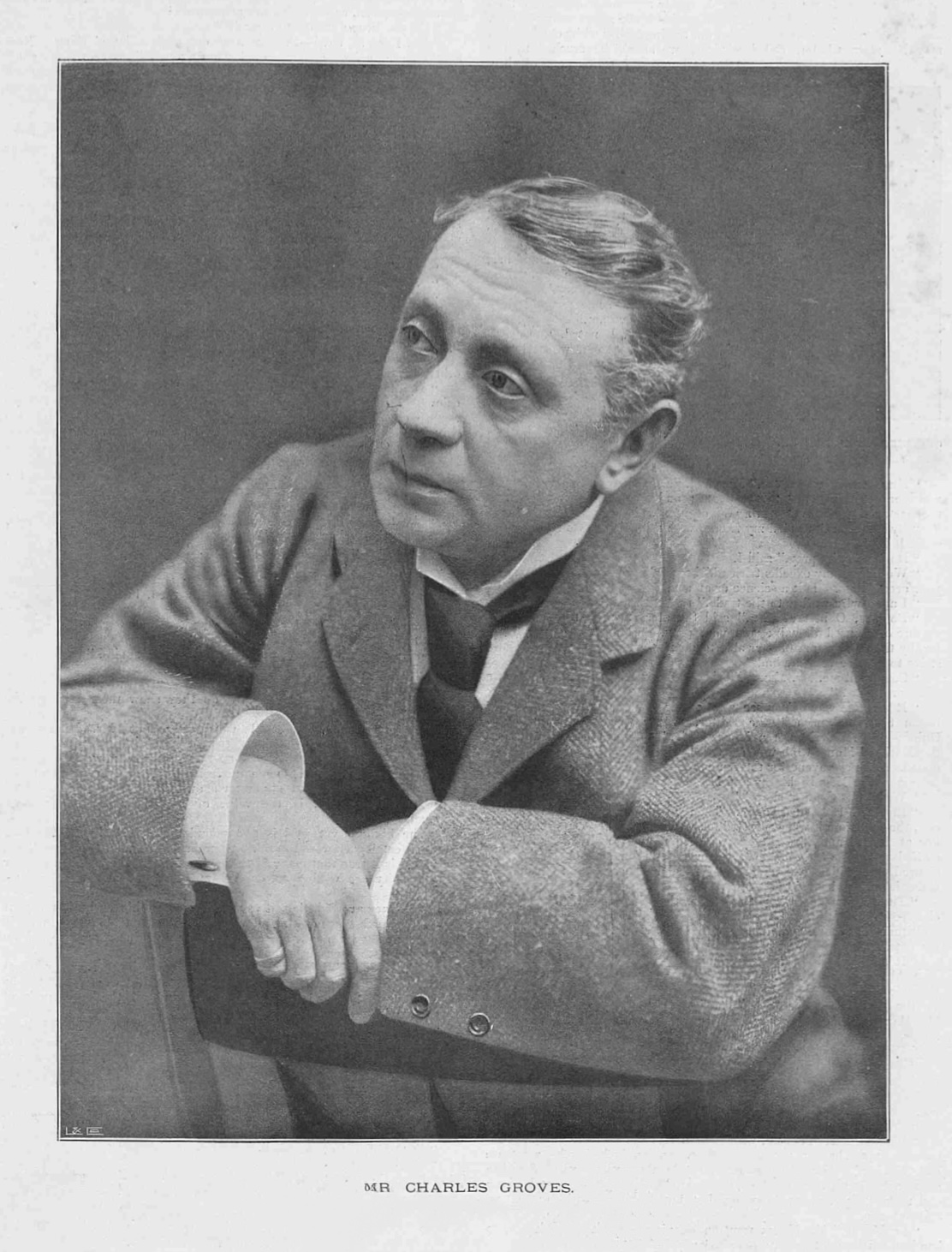
Portrait of Charles Groves in a February 1897 edition of the British society magazine The Sketch

Charles Groves (6 December 1843 − 8 July 1909) was an Irish-born, British stage actor of the Victorian era, associated with his work in comedy in London's West End and on Broadway.

== Biography ==
Groves was born in Limerick, eldest of the ten children of the Groves family. His parents were actors Charles Groves (1807−1864) and Martha Bigg (1822−1915), who were touring Ireland with a theatre company. His father was a provincial actor of thirty years experience, while his mother had been a successful child star, appearing in the title role of Tom Thumb at the Theatre Royal, Haymarket and in Peter Bell, The Waggoner at the Royal Coburg Theatre (today the Old Vic).

His first appearance onstage was at ten months old in the play Mr. and Mrs. White at the Theatre Royal, Monmouth, alongside his parents. He continued to work and perform in his family's theatre company throughout his childhood.

In adulthood he joined the Brighton Theatre Royal as resident low comedian in many of its productions.

He made his London debut on Boxing Day, 1871 at the Covent Garden Theatre (today the Royal Opera House) as Lebeau in the farce The Lost Letter and as Sister Anne in the pantomime Blue Beard. He subsequently spent several years with Mr. C. Bernard's theatre company at the Gaiety Theatre, Glasgow (today the site of the Glasgow Empire) where he established himself as a great favourite in comedy and Victorian burlesque, remaining with the company until March 1877.

In 1881 Groves toured the United States, engaged by the D'Oyly Carte Opera Company in Billee Taylor as Sir Mincing Lane.

On his return to London, he gained wider notice in the West End with his appearance as Uncle Blizzard in Confusion at the Vaudeville Theatre. He followed this success with Uncles and Aunts at the Comedy Theatre, Mamma at the Royal Court Theatre, and then with his greatest performance as Gregory Goldfinch in A Pair of Spectacles alongside John Hare at the Garrick Theatre in 1890. Groves returned to the cast of Spectacles to tour the United States and in 1896 appeared on Broadway with Hare at the Knickerbocker Theatre. The New York Journal described Groves as "an artist to the fingertips."

In 1891 Hare and Groves performed Spectacles with the Garrick company on two separate private occasions for the Royal Family. The first, at Sandringham House, was to mark the birthday of Prince Albert Victor, Duke of Clarence and Avondale on 8 January at the invitation of his father, the then Prince of Wales, as a surprise gift. On 17 March, Hare and Groves appeared in Spectacles at Windsor Castle for Queen Victoria. The Queen wrote enthusiastically about the event in her journal later that night: "We all went over to the Waterloo Gallery to see a performance of the play, A Pair of Spectacles, which was extremely good. It is a very pretty play, adapted from the French. Mr. Hare acts admirably and so does Mr. Groves; in fact, all did very well. The piece, which was in two acts, was followed by a short one-act one, called A Quiet Rubber. We went again to the drawing-room, where I received the company."

The later part of Groves's career includes seasons as Mr. Blossom in The Elder Miss Blossom at the St James's Theatre (1898, revived 1901).

In 1907, Groves performed in a revival of The School for Scandal with Edward Compton at the St. James Theatre.

He returned to the role of Gregory Goldfinch in A Pair of Spectacles throughout the 1900s, and was engaged to perform on a final tour to mark Sir John Hare's retirement in 1907. On 14 November a performance of the play was given at Windsor Castle in the presence of King Edward VII, Queen Alexandra, the German Kaiser, and the Prince and Princess of Wales.

Groves died at his home in Pulborough, East Sussex on 8 July 1909. News of his death prompted many affectionate obituaries in various newspapers of the day. "So excellent an actor, so lovable a man", summed The Referee.

"Everybody must have been under the impression that Charles Groves was himself as robust as the fine performance in which he made the artistic success of his career. The comedian was, in truth, most delicate; often at work amusing the public when he ought to have been in bed, and too often, perforce "resting" when he was itching to be at work. His market price, owing largely to his modesty, was never commensurate with his artistic value; and I question whether any office would have insured so frail a life... the public is under a debt of gratitude to Charles Groves."

— Sydney Grundy, Dramatist, A Pair of Spectacles.

Charles Groves was a brother of Walter Groves (1856−1906), a comedian with the Fred Karno Company.

In 1869 he married Elizabeth Eleanor Reynolds in Manchester. Two of their sons became prominent actors of stage and film: Charles Groves (1876−1955) and Fred Groves (1881−1955).
