= Tales from Fat Tulip's Garden =

British children's television series

Tales from Fat Tulip's Garden was a British children's TV programme in the mid-1980s, starring Tony Robinson. It was produced by Debbie Gates for Central Independent Television and was broadcast on the ITV network from 1985 to 1987, in a 4:00pm timeslot, with each episode lasting about 10 minutes. The series won prizes at the Chicago International Festival of Children's Films and the Children's Program at the San Francisco International Film Festival.

Robinson told children's stories directly to camera in an English garden setting, with Robinson performing each character's dialogue in different voices. The show was written by Gates and Robinson and carried by Robinson's unique and engaging storytelling style, which was semi-improvised.

The stories generally involved the adventures of Ernie and Slyv, two frogs who lived in the titular garden; the garden's (presumably) human owner, Fat Tulip, who lived in the adjoining house; and often Fat Tulip's best friend, Thin Tim. Other characters included Lewis Collins the Tortoise, Fred the Baddy, Gilbert Harding Sheep, Bunting Tadpole, Anwar and Amita Rabbit, Tracey Bee, a cockle called Jim Morrison, and the Terrible Stinkers - Peter, Paul and Mary. Robinson hoped to provoke the imagination and to produce a sense of immediacy in contrast to the shortcomings he saw in children's television at the time.

The majority of the programme was filmed in the house and garden of Little Monkhams, a property in Woodford Green in the London Borough of Redbridge. Further scenes were filmed in the part of Epping Forest facing the house (Lord's Bushes and Knighton Woods).

Two books based on the series, Tales from Fat Tulip's Garden (ISBN 0-590-70453-2) and Tales From Fat Tulip's Garden: Meet a Dog Called Dorian (ISBN 0-590-70451-6), were published in 1985.

== Transmission guide ==
- Series 1: 13 episodes from 1 May 1985
- Series 2: 13 episodes from 4 June 1987
