= An Evening with Gary Lineker =

1991 stage play and 1994 television film

An Evening with Gary Lineker is a 1991 stage play and 1994 television film both written by Arthur Smith and Chris England.

The action takes place against the backdrop of the 1990 Football World Cup semi-final, between England and West Germany, which is taking place in Italy while Monica and Bill are on holiday in Ibiza. Bill desperately wants to watch the match; Monica wants to talk about their relationship.

The play was nominated for an Olivier Award.

A 90-minute television drama, adapted by Smith and England from their playscript, was produced by Andy Harries for Granada Television and aired on 14 June 1994 on ITV just before the start of the 1994 World Cup and was repeated 4 years later during France 98. It starred Caroline Quentin as Monica and Clive Owen as Bill, with the supporting cast including Quentin's then real-life husband Paul Merton as Bill's wet, annoying best friend Ian, who has accompanied them on the holiday to Monica's consternation. Lizzy McInnerny plays Birgitta, a German whom Ian has met in Ibiza, and Martin Clunes plays Dan, a client of Bill's publishing company with whom Monica is having an affair, who is coincidentally in Ibiza too. Gary Lineker makes a cameo appearance and the voice of John Motson is provided by impressionist Alistair McGowan.

== Cast (Television Film) ==
- Clive Owen as Bill Desbackos
- Caroline Quentin as Monica Desbackos
- Martin Clunes as Dan Hudson
- Paul Merton as Ian Marshall
- Lizzy McInnerny as Birgitta
- Arthur Smith as Taxi Driver
- Chris England as Man in toilet
- Gary Lineker as Himself (Cameo)

== See also ==
My Summer with Des
