= Debbie Gates =

UK television writer and producer

Debbie Gates is a UK television writer and producer. She specialised in children's stories told on location by actors taking the parts of various characters without costumes, make-up or props. She is best known for writing and producing Tales From Fat Tulip's Garden, broadcast by ITV in May and June, 1985. This series won prizes at the Chicago International Festival of Children's Films and the Children's Program at the San Francisco International Film Festival. It was followed by the sequel Fat Tulip Too (thirteen episodes shown during the summer of 1987) and then a Christmas special on 25 December 1987.

The Fat Tulip stories were told and co-written by Tony Robinson and included characters such as Thin Tim, Fred the Baddy, Gilbert Harding Sheep, Bunting Tadpole, Anwar and Amita Rabbit, Tracey Bee, a cockle called Jim Morrison, and the Terrible Stinkers - Peter, Paul and Mary. Spin-off books were also published in 1985: Meet a Dog Called Dorian and Never Eat a Tortoise in picture book format, and Tales from Fat Tulip's Garden as a paperback.

Gates' other series included:

- Gum Tree, cowritten and acted by Ben Keaton and broadcast in the spring of 1988 by Channel 4. The description for episode five: "In his new room at Gumtree House Mathew Milligan is searching for his socks. Unfortunately he opens the wrong box, and it contains Raj Mandi Gumbi Beans that are beginning to wake up..."
- Revolting Animals, written and told by Morwenna Banks, Chris England, Andy Taylor and Chris Lang. The program was shot on location at the London Zoo and shown in 1988.
- Jellyneck, written and told by Morwenna Banks, Chris England, Andy Taylor and Chris Lang. The program was shot on location and shown in 1989.

All these series were directed by Jeremy McCracken.
