= Blind Men =

British television sitcom

- Genre: Sitcom
- Written by: Chris England; Nick Hancock
- Directed by: Tony Dow (ep. 1); David Askey (eps. 2–6)
- Starring: Jesse Birdsall; Roger Blake; Tamsin Greig
- Theme music composer: Simon Webb
- Country of origin: United Kingdom
- Original language: English
- No. of series: 1
- No. of episodes: 6

Production
- Executive producer: Humphrey Barclay
- Producer: Mark Robson
- Running time: 30 minutes
- Production company: LWT

Original release
- Network: ITV
- Release: 21 November 1997 – 2 January 1998

Blind Men is a British television sitcom produced by LWT and transmitted on the ITV network between 21 November 1997 and 2 January 1998.

Written by the duo Chris England and Nick Hancock, the series starred Jesse Birdsall and Roger Blake as Phil Carver and Bob as the window blind salesmen and Graham Holdcroft (Jeremy Swift) is a hard-working but not too successful window blinds people. Rival salesmen Tony, Neil and Bob compete with him for sales, encouraged by their young and verbally abusive boss Ian Stapleton. Things go downhill for the team when wonder-salesman Phil Carver is transferred in and the rivalry really intensifies. The show's theme tune was a cover of the ABBA hit single from 1980 called The Winner Takes It All.

== Cast ==
- Jesse Birdsall – Phil Carver
- Roger Blake – Bob
- Tamsin Greig – Valerie Marsden
- Raji James – Neil
- Danny Swanson – Ian
- Jeremy Swift – Graham Holdcroft
- Andy Taylor – Tony
- Sophie Thompson – Caroline Holdcroft

== Episodes ==
No.	Title	Original release date
1	"The Winner Takes It All"	21 November 1997
2	"The House-Warming"	28 November 1997
3	"Sneaking the Sneck"	5 December 1997
4	"Strap Me Vitals"	12 December 1997
5	"Blood Letting"	19 December 1997
6	"Ready When You Are, Graham and Phil..."	2 January 1998
