= Groves family =

British theatre family

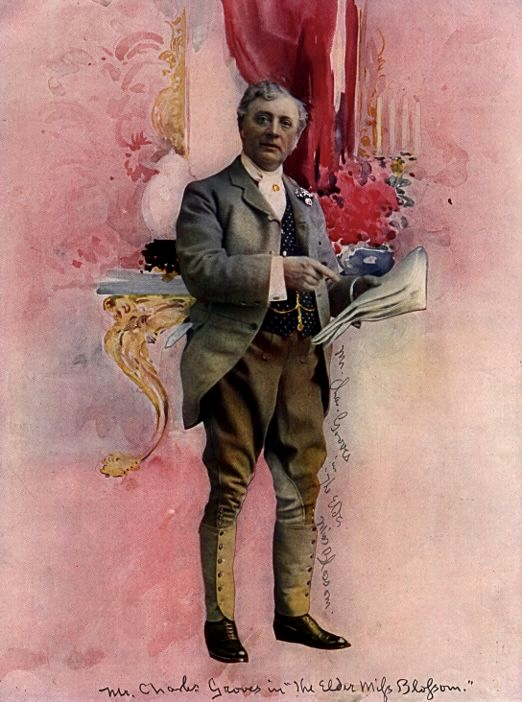
Charles Groves in the stage play The Elder Miss Blossom, 1898

The Groves family is a British theatre family which traces its roots to the Regency era. Its descendants include actors of the Victorian stage, the British Music Hall, Broadway theatre and motion pictures.

== Lineage ==
The family can be traced back to Charles Groves (1807—1866) and Martha Bigg (1822—1915). Bigg began her acting career playing children’s roles in London’s West End in 1830, appearing in Peter Bell the Wagonner at the Royal Cobourg Theatre (today The Old Vic) and in the title role of Tom Thumb at the Theatre Royal, Haymarket. She married Groves in 1841 and together they toured the provinces, acting, producing and devising shows over the next two decades, simultaneously raising a family of ten children while travelling and working in theatres across Britain and Ireland.

== Victorian Generation ==
Charles Groves (1843—1909) born in Limerick, Ireland. He performed as a pantomime clown, dramatic actor and comedian in London’s West End and on Broadway. He also toured the United States with the D’Oyly Carte Opera. He is noted for his stage performances alongside Sir John Hare in A Pair of Spectacles (Garrick Theatre). Two of his sons, Charles Groves (1876—1955) and Fred Groves (1881—1955), achieved note in theatre and on film, with careers encompassing the transition of the silent period to the age of the talkies. The sons died within ten days of each other in 1955.

Emma Groves (1846—1926) born in Monmouthshire, Wales. Played in Romeo and Juliet, The Hunchback, and Hamlet at Sadler’s Wells in 1874-5 and in pantomime at the Crystal Palace in 1889. She married the comedian Robert Robertson and they toured together widely. She is buried at Highgate Cemetery.

Mary Ann Groves (1848—1928) born in Lambeth, London. According to censuses, she worked as a prison warden and in domestic service. She died unmarried and without issue in Salford, Manchester, aged 80.

Elizabeth "Lizzie" Groves (1850—1935) born in Swansea, Wales. Lizzie performed throughout the provinces in Victorian comedy and burlesque (often alongside her sister Pattie), and in pantomime at the Covent Garden Theatre (today the Royal Opera House). She married Byron Pedley (b. 1844), a noted stage comedian who was diagnosed with ‘confusional insanity’, eventually dying in a London asylum in 1910.

Martha Maria "Pattie" Groves (1853—1941). Born Warrington, Cheshire. Worked as a child actress, then in pantomime and in stage comedies across the United Kingdom. Married Richard Hicks (1851—1900), an Irish stage comedian who succumbed to alcohol addiction. On 26 December 1900, Hicks died of starvation in a London workhouse, estranged from Pattie for over ten years. Their daughter Madeline Hicks (1881—1961), an actress with the London Comedy Company, married George Richards in Rangoon in 1904, and subsequently worked in theatres across British India. At 88 years old, Pattie was the last of Charles and Martha's children to die, nearly 55 years after the first, her younger brother Arthur.

Henry “Harry” Groves (1854—1924). Born Leeds, Yorkshire. Little is known of Harry except, according to censuses, he worked as a groom and carriage driver. His great-granddaughter Linda Groves married the Liverpool-born comedian George Roper in 1968. Thus, Harry is a 2nd great-grandfather to the actor and comedian Matt Roper.

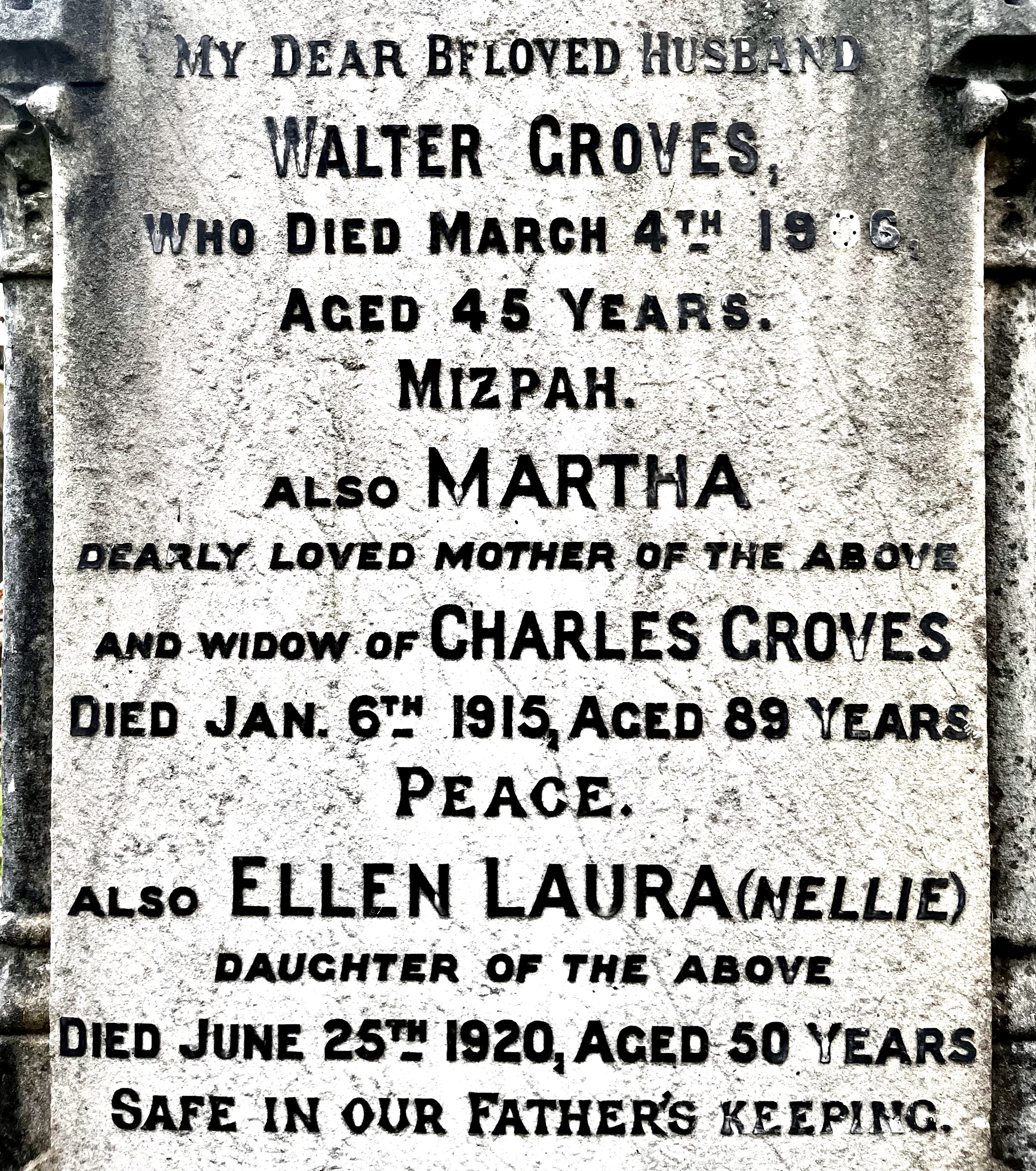
The tombstone of three members of the Groves family in Sale Cemetery, Manchester

Walter Groves (1856—1906). Born in Manchester, Lancashire. In addition to achieving success as an actor in the legitimate theatres, Walter also wrote, produced and starred in his own comedy sketches which toured the British music halls. He is noted for becoming the first spoken-word comedian in the Fred Karno Company, having originated the role of Sgt. Lightning onstage in Karno’s first full length musical-comedy Her Majesty’s Guests. He is also said to have created the walk that Charlie Chaplin made world famous as the Little Tramp — a claim made by Karno himself. Walter married the actress Lizzie Aney and fathered two children. Their descendants include the actors Lily Groves (daughter), Donald Groves (grandson) and the writer Fiona Gruber (great-granddaughter).

Matilda “Tilly'' Groves (1859—1898) Born in Birmingham, Warwickshire. Played the title role in Little Bo Peep at the Covent Garden Theatre in 1873. Her subsequent appearances, billed as ”Little Tilly Groves”, were highly publicized and very successful. This prominence faded as she reached adulthood, and she played minor character parts in provincial roles until her death in 1898.

Arthur Groves (1861—1886). Born in Northamptonshire. Worked as an actor and comedian. Arthur, who died of pulmonary tuberculosis at the age of 25, was the first of the Groves children to die, with his mother outliving him by almost thirty years.

Ellen Laura "Nelly" Groves (1865—1920). Born in Northamptonshire. She played alongside her elder sister Tilly in Little Bo Peep at the Covent Garden Theatre (1873) and as Little Red Riding Hood at the same theatre. In later years Nelly lived as her mother’s constant companion until Martha’s death in 1915.

== See also ==
- List of show business families
