= Bostock's Cup =

- Written by: Chris England; Nick Hancock
- Directed by: Marcus Mortimer
- Starring: Nick Hancock, Tim Healy, Neil Pearson
- Country of origin: United Kingdom
- Original language: English

Production
- Executive producer: Humphrey Barclay
- Producer: Mark Robson
- Cinematography: Peter Morgan
- Editor: Steve Tempia
- Running time: 75 minutes
- Production company: London Weekend Television

Original release
- Network: ITV
- Release: 25 May 1999

Bostock's Cup was a one-off British television comedy drama about a football team which appeared on ITV on the eve of the 1999 European Cup final. It was written by Chris England, directed by Marcus Mortimer and produced by Mark Robson. It starred Tim Healy as the club's manager, Neil Pearson as a veteran sportscaster, and Nick Hancock as his upstart rival. The film featured innovative use of old footage of 1970s football matches to recreate the era. It was aired on 25 May 1999.

== Synopsis ==
Mike Tonker, a small-time sports journalist, is given the task of hosting a dinner gala honouring both Gerry Tudor, a well-known sports personality, and Bostock Stanley, a since-defunct football team. Tudor made a name for himself by producing and hosting a documentary about Stanley's 1973-74 season, which simultaneously saw them relegated from the Third Division with a record low points total, and yet getting to and winning that year's FA Cup final.

The film-within-a-film begins with Stanley appointing Bertie Masson, a journeyman old-school manager, with Masson's first act being to demote top scorer Alan Hardy from the captaincy and appoint hard man Mick Wallace to the position. Despite Stanley's hopeless league form, they manage to beat fellow Third Division strugglers Southport in the FA Cup, and then non-league Pontefract Athletic, despite the latter's 45-degree sloping pitch.

During the course of the dinner, Tonker gets a phone call from a mysterious informant, claiming to have information with which Tonker can ruin Tudor's career and advance his own. Tonker follows the instructions, and stumbles across an archive of unused footage from Tudor's film. When the film presentation resumes, it shows Stanley beating Chelsea in the fifth round, before recording suspicious victories against Hull City, where the Hull players suddenly become scared of the ball after Tudor arranges for a hypnotist to visit them, and then Leicester City, thanks in equal parts to a dazzling performance by a mysterious new player called Brian Parkinson (who is brought in at Tudor's recommendation after Hardy is pranked into submitting a transfer request, causing Masson to drop him from the team), and the referee demonstrating blatant bias against Leicester.

The FA Cup final sees Stanley coming up against First Division champions Leeds United, who are out to secure the Double. Against all the odds, and partly thanks to Wallace punching Billy Bremner in the groin just before kick-off, Stanley triumph 1–0.

After the film ends, Tonker reveals the additional footage, showing that Tudor bribed the referee in the Leicester match, illegally brought Brian Parkinson (actually an obscure member of Brazil's 1970 World Cup squad named Nero) into the country, and then secretly exploited a loophole in the leasehold to buy out Stanley's stadium, which he then demolished and replaced with a hotel, leading to Stanley going out of business before the 1974-75 season. Tudor weakly denies the accusations and then leaves, with Tonker expecting a promotion for his actions, only for his bosses to instead fire him for ruining the reputation of their most bankable star, as well as his needlessly humiliating Masson by showing a clip of his wife, Margaret, having sex with Tudor on Stanley's pitch (in turn causing Masson to dejectedly realise that his son, Trevor, is actually Tudor's son). He then discovers that his informant was actually Alan Hardy, who was bitter at Tudor over costing him a place in the final squad by bringing in "Parkinson."

Masson and the former players angrily confront Tudor in a bathroom, with Masson demanding to know the full extent of his meddling. Tudor confesses to his various misdeeds, but says that the only matches he actually played a part in rigging were the ones against Hull and Leicester, revealing that it was actually Leeds who bribed the referee in the cup final, and yet still lost. The Stanley players leave to celebrate, knowing their victory was still legitimate, while Masson tells Tudor that he will have to live with the consequences of his actions. Tudor, however, is confident that his career will soon recover, predicting that the worst thing that will happen is that he'll have to start working for Sky Sports.

== Cast ==
- Nick Hancock – Mike Tonker
- Philip McGough – Nick Barber
- Neil Pearson – Gerry Tudor
- Tim Healy – Bertie Masson
- Maria McErlane – Margaret Masson
- Philip Middlemiss – Bob Phillips
- Roy Barraclough – Arthur Swarbrick
- Ralph Ineson – Clive Kennard
- Christopher Rowe – Ian Wagg
- Jason Watkins – Tommy Bennett
- Chris England – George Best
- Neil Bennun – Ronnie Kay
- Paul Bennun – Reggie Kay
- David MacCreedy – Mick Wallace
- Glenn Hugill – Alan Hardy
- Ralf Little – Norman Lewis
- Robert Harley – Rodger Hartley
- Rocky Marshall – Mark Bull
- Tony Marshall – Brian Parkinson
- Paul Simpkin – Neville Swarbrick
- Davinia Taylor – Denise Bull
- Andy Greenhalgh – Victor Lewington
- Jeremy Swift – Sam Tilton
- Jonathan Magnanti – Dave Skipper
- Howard Lee – Pontefract referee
- Stuart Egdell – Young Pete
- Gordon Kennedy – Edgar Pendulo
- Terry Neill as himself
- Victoria Plum – Ballet mistress
- Jonathan Gould – Interviewer
- Andy Smart – Reporter
- Brian Moore – Commentator
