= Arthur Smith's Balham Bash =

British comedy and music radio show

- Genre: Comedy radio Full-service radio
- Country of origin: United Kingdom
- Language: English
- Home station: BBC Radio 4
- Hosted by: Arthur Smith
- Starring: Pippa Evans
- Recording studio: Balham, London, England
- Original release: 2009 – 2011

Arthur Smith's Balham Bash is a comedy and music show hosted by Arthur Smith. It is recorded at his own house in Balham, London, and features both stand-up comedy and musical acts. Three series were broadcast on BBC Radio 4 from 2009 to 2011. Other than Smith, the only other regular on the show was Pippa Evans, performing as singer-songwriter Loretta Maine.
