= Sanford and Lyons =

English comedy duo

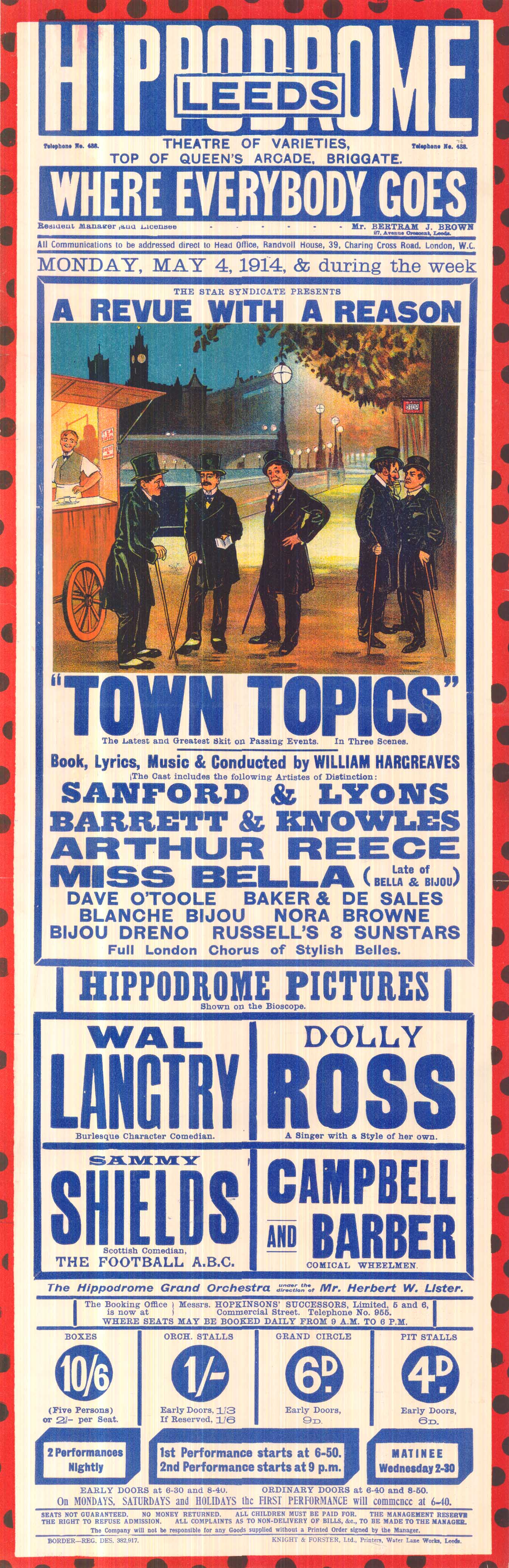
- Poster advertising an appearance of Sanford and Lyons at the Hippodrome Theatre, Leeds, on a 1914 tour of the United Kingdom.

Comedy career
- Years active: 1890–1920
- Medium: Music hall, variety, circus, revue
- Genres: comedy, musical comedy, dance

George "Sanford" Bradbury (1869—1950) and George "Lyons" Jennings (1872—1911), known as Sanford and Lyons, were popular English music hall comedians of the late 19th and early 20th centuries.

They were best known for their simultaneous dance and comedy routines, gaining popularity throughout the provinces and in London's variety theatres, where they enjoyed great success at the Oxford Music Hall and at the Tivoli Theatre of Varieties. The pair also performed for King George V and Queen Mary (then the Prince and Princess of Wales) at the Theatre Royal, Drury Lane.

Among their audiences was a young Charlie Chaplin, who shares reminisces of Sanford and Lyons in his travel writings A Comedian Sees the World, first published in 1932.

At the conclusion of their career The Music Hall and Theatre Review commended Sanford and Lyons for creating "a style that was extensively copied".

== Biography ==
George Sanford was born George Henry Bradbury in the city of Liverpool to musician Robert Henry Bradbury and Susannah Bell in the predominantly Irish Catholic neighbourhood of Everton. His elder brother John "Cullen" Bradbury (1868—1929) gained fame as one half of the comedy double act Cullen and Carthy. Their father's early death from scarlet fever in 1870 left their mother widowed with two infant sons at the relatively young age of twenty-seven. Susannah remarried to Joseph Roper in 1872, giving birth to a further five children. Such was the popularity of the two brothers that upon their mother's death in 1908, various national newspapers published their condolences.

George Lyons was born George William John Jennings in the West Derby neighbourhood of Liverpool to James Jennings, a painter, and his wife Catherine. He was one of ten children.

Aside from their success in the music halls, the duo established themselves as popular performers in pantomime throughout the United Kingdom. These appearances include The Forty Thieves (Royalty Theatre Chester, 1898), Babes In The Wood (St. James Theatre, Manchester 1899), Cinderella (Grand Junction Theatre, Manchester 1901), Aladdin (Theatre Royal, Bristol 1902), Little Red Riding Hood (Theatre Royal, Bristol 1903), Little Red Riding Hood (Grand Theatre, Brighton 1904), The Sleeping Beauty (Princes Theatre, Manchester 1905), Aladdin (Grand Theatre, Leeds 1906) and Robinson Crusoe (Grand Theatre, Brighton 1909). Their seasons at Bristol's Theatre Royal (today the Bristol Old Vic) were triumphs: the theatre reported record attendances. Such was the success of Aladdin that the production was extended to March 14, 1903. At the conclusion of the season, the Bristol Magpie reported the duo's popularity:

"If you want to get even standing room you will have to go early to the Theatre Royal on Friday night. For on that night Sanford and Lyons take their benefit, and Bristol is going to turn out in force to express their esteem and admiration for two of the hardest working and most genuinely funny comedians that have ever appeared on the boards of the old-made-new-house in King Street. The pair are not new to pantomime business, and as they write their own words and compose their own music, their turns are always new and original."

From 1905 Sanford and Lyons began to appear to great success at the major music halls in London. In April 1905 a reviewer from The London Entr'acte highlighted their performance: "A notable success is being made at the Oxford by Sanford and Lyons. They dress in black and white gloves and white spats over their boots. Their dancing, besides being extremely clever in itself, is most effectively presented. The lights are lowered, so that the eye is attracted only by their rhythmically moving hands and feet. They dance together in perfect time, and also essay — with complete acceptance — some amusing "crosstalk" business. They take several "calls" at the conclusion of their smart performance."

In September 1908 Sanford and Lyons featured at the Oxford Music Hall alongside Marie Lloyd, Little Tich and Cinquevalli. Writing in The Stage newspaper, one reporter observed "the excellence of these two young men... the freshness of their jokes, the skill of their dances... makes one forget that there are others of inferior degree."

On 11 May 1909 the duo were selected to appear before the Prince and Princess of Wales (later King George V and Queen Mary) at the Theatre Royal, Drury Lane for a gala matinee performance to raise funds for the Queen Alexandra Sanatorium.

== Death and legacy ==
The original partnership ended with the death of George Lyons in June 1911. His health had reportedly broken down for several months preceding, and he eventually succumbed to "a chill with consumption". The Clifton Society, reporting his funeral, noted that he was "carried off in the zenith of his success as a star of the variety stage".

Sanford continued the act with a new partner, starring in the 1914 London Palladium revue Town Topics, but by the 1920s had entered retirement. A 1929 feature on Sanford in The Stage reported him as being "unable to stay away from variety". He became a prominent member of the Water Rats charity, and died in October 1950 at the age of 81. Obituaries noted his support of the Variety Artists Federation during the early days of the union.

George Sanford's descendants include his daughter Jessie "Jeannie" Bradbury (1916—1967) — a BBC singer for the wartime General Forces Programme, his great-nephew George Roper (1934—2003) who achieved national recognition as a stand-up comedian on British television during the 1970s and 1980s, and a son of the latter, Matt Roper (1977—) a theatre and variety performer, today living in New York City.

== Resources and Further Reading ==
Working the Halls — Honri, Peter and Milligan, Spike (D. C. Heath, 1973)

A Comedian Sees the World — Chaplin, Charlie (Crowell Publishing Company, 1933)

The Vaudevillians — Smith, Bill (Macmillan, 1976)

The Melodies Linger On: The Story of Music Hall — Macqueen-Pope, Walter (Allen, 1950)

Recollections of Vesta Tilley — De Frece, Lady Matilda Alice Powles (Hutchinson, 1934)

The Era Almanack — The Era (Cornell University, 1911)

English Dance and Song (Vols. 45–46) — Indiana University (EFDSS, 1983)

The Billboard (Vol. 20, iss. 15) — Billboard Magazine (11/04/1908)
