= Byron Pedley =

English stage comedian

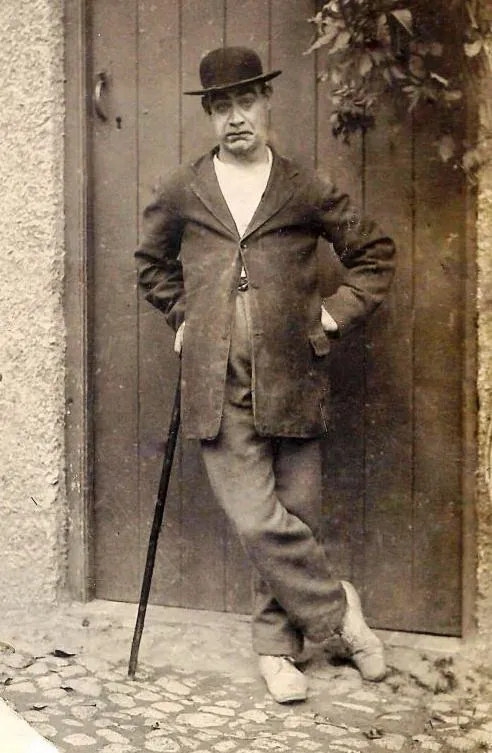

Byron Pedley (1844–1910) was an English stage comedian of the Victorian era.

Pedley was born in Chorlton-upon-Medlock, Manchester.

Aside from a career as a low comedian in the Music Halls, he appeared in many pantomimes and in the legitimate theatre as an actor.

Critics described Pedley as "an energetic and entertaining showman", "wonderfully humourous [sic]", and "inimitable".

Among his best remembered performances was as Mr. Dennis Muldoon in Muldoon’s Picnic, a role he returned to several times over three decades.

In 1901 he appeared to great success with G.M Polini and Austen Melford’s company in The Silver King, in which he played Detective Samuel Baxter. Pedley starred for six years in the production, touring to major theatres and opera houses to critical and public acclaim through to 1907.

On 17 June 1910 following a period of unemployment and treatment for heart disease, Pedley was admitted to the Long Grove asylum with confusional insanity and delirium. He died just a few weeks later, at the age of 62, on 4 July 1910.

Pedley was married twice. He was widowed at the age of 32 with the early death of his first wife Mary Ann Barber. In 1879 he married again, to the actress Elizabeth Groves of the Groves theatrical family. He was a father to five children.
