= Pippa Evans =

British comedian

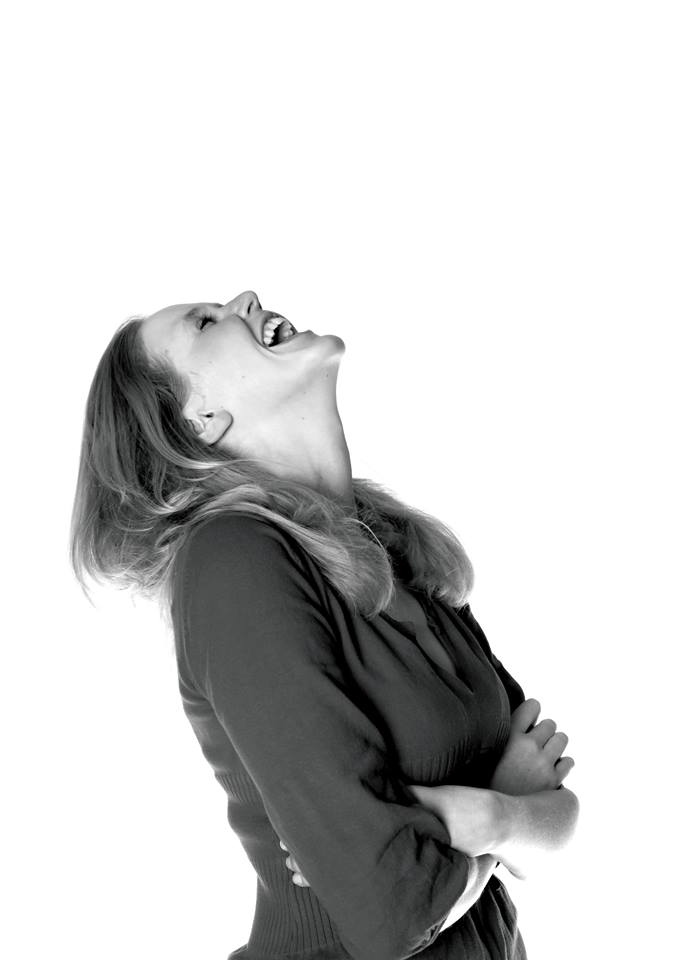
- Evans in 2017
- Born: June 1982 (age 44); Ealing Broadway, London
- Notable work: Showstopper! The Improvised Musical; Fast and Loose

Comedy career
- Medium: theatre, radio
- Genres: Sketch comedy, improv
- Pippa Evans's voice from the BBC programme Loose Ends, 12 January 2013.

Pippa Evans (born June 1982) is a British comedian, known for her work in character and improvisational comedy.

== Early life and education ==
Evans attended Notting Hill and Ealing High School, an independent school for girls, where she was head girl. She studied Drama and Theatre Arts at Birmingham University.

== Career ==
After leaving university she became a member of Scratch improvisation comedy troupe, and appeared in Newsrevue, a topical comedy show at London's Canal Cafe Theatre. In 2008, she gained second place in the annual Hackney Empire New Act of the Year competition.

In her solo debut at the 2008 Edinburgh Festival Fringe with Pippa Evans and Other Lonely People, she played a number of different characters at a self-help group meeting. Evans received positive reviews from the press, with The Scotsman describing her as "wicked and dark, with few gimmicks". She was nominated for Best Newcomer at the Edinburgh Comedy Awards, before performing the show at London's Soho Theatre for a limited season.

Evans's best known stage character is Loretta Maine, a disturbed American singer-songwriter described by The Guardian newspaper as "Dolly Parton seen through the lens of Mike Leigh". In 2009 she performed on the BBC Radio 4 series Arthur Smith's Balham Bash as Loretta Maine.

She returned to the Edinburgh Festival Fringe in 2009 with another show titled Pippa Evans: Your Evening's Entertainment, a variety show for an imagined audience of conference delegates where Evans plays all the characters. In an interview with The Scotsman, Evans revealed "I was brought up with old time music halls and doing pantos in church halls... it was a big part of my background that always appealed to me". The show was again warmly received but it was the character of Loretta Maine which critics highlighted. In November 2009 she curated and hosted Pippa's Old Time New Time Music Hall at the Canal Cafe Theatre, introducing audiences to her contemporaries Angelos Epithemiou, the Penny Dreadfuls and Wilfredo in a satire on the tradition of music hall.

In 2010 she presented an entire show at the Fringe as Maine in I'm Not Drunk, I Just Need To Talk To You. The Independent's critic observed "Maine belongs to a recognizable stable of bitter songstresses and swigs on a screw-topped bottle of wine, while spewing out her vitriol any which way".

Evans is a core member of the improv team behind the stage show Showstopper! The Improvised Musical. With the cast of Showstopper, Evans has toured the UK and abroad. In February 2011 the show opened at the Ambassadors Theatre in London's West End, coinciding with the broadcast of a series for BBC Radio Four.

She was a series regular on the BBC Two television improv show Fast and Loose which aired in January 2011.

She was also a regular in Newsjack in October 2011 on BBC Radio 7 (now BBC Radio 4 Extra) and has made guest appearances on the Radio 4 satire series The Now Show.

On 1 December 2012, as Loretta Maine, she released the song Happy Goddamn Christmas (feat. Matt Roper) which peaked at No. 6 on the iTunes UK Comedy Charts. An accompanying video was released on 13 December, featuring cameos by Arthur Smith, Imran Yusuf, Ruth Bratt and Thom Tuck, via BBC Three.

In 2013, Evans co-founded The Sunday Assembly, a monthly gathering for the non-religious.

In 2015, Evans appeared as a panellist in two episodes of the CBBC panel show The Dog Ate My Homework and since 2016 she has made frequent appearances on the long-running radio comedy I'm Sorry I Haven't a Clue (including a recording at the Royal Albert Hall for the programme's 50th anniversary in 2022).

In 2021, Evans published a self-help book based on her experience as an improviser called Improv Your Life. The Guardian says, "This "improviser's guide to embracing whatever life throws at you", written under lockdown, illustrates how the building blocks of improv are tools for winning at life."

In 2024, Evans authored Now That's What I Call a Musical!, a jukebox musical based on the album series Now That's What I Call Music! (often shortened to NOW).
