= Sue Pedley =

Tasmanian artist

Sue Pedley (born 1954) is an Australian multi-media artist known for site-specific artworks in Australia and overseas. She has participated in residencies including the Bundanon Trust Creative Research Residency in 2016, the Tokyo Wonder Site in 2012, and the 2008 International Sculpture Symposium, Vietnam. Pedley works solo and in collaboration with other artists.

== Early life ==
Pedley grew up in Launceston, Northern Tasmania where her mother Peggy Pedley co-founded the Riverside Pottery Studio, a long-running gallery, ceramics studio and teaching hub. Members routinely worked with local clays.

Pedley initially studied Early Childhood Education, later switching to art, and graduating Bachelor of Fine Arts, from the Tasmanian School of Art in 1985. She was a guest student at Städelschule, Frankfurt, Germany. In 1997 she completed a Master of Fine Art at the Sydney College of the Arts.

== Career ==
Pedley held her first solo exhibition, the intertidal zone, at Fitzroy's Gertrude Street Gallery in 1991. Then, as now, her work draws from the natural world. Her art is triggered by the shapes, textures and stories from beaches, waterways, and vegetation.

Sue and Peggy Pedley's joint Patches of Light exhibition was held at Queen Victoria Museum and Art Gallery Tasmania in 2019. The Pedley family is bound to the Tasmanian landscape "through a history of labour, trade, and artistic practice across six generations following the colonisation of Tasmania".

Pedley's art often features large-scale drawing, rubbings, or cyanotypes. Found objects, including organic mementos like seaweed, bamboo and fleece also appear in her work.

Since 1995, she has been a drawing tutor at art schools in Sydney, including the Sydney College of the Arts and the National Art School.

== Selected group exhibitions ==
- 2021 Womanifesto Southeast Asia Biennial, Guangzhou Academy of Fine Arts
- 2019 Hands Across the Pacific, curator Ian Howard, Ningbo Museum of Art, China
- 2015 Future Feminist Archive, Daughters Mothers, SCA Galleries, University of Sydney
- 2006 Light Sensitive, Contemporary Australian Photography, National Gallery of Victoria, Melbourne
- 2006 William and Winifred Bowness Photography Prize, Monash University Gallery, Melbourne
- 2006 Jacaranda Acquisitive Drawing Award, Grafton Regional Gallery
- 2006 We are Australian Too, Casula Powerhouse Art Centre
- 2006 Australian Photographic Portrait Prize, Art Gallery of NSW, Sydney
- 2004 Tamworth Fibre Biennial, 2004, Tamworth Regional Gallery.
- 2004 53rd Blake Prize, Sir Hermann Black Gallery, Sydney
- 2004 National Small Sculpture Prize, Woollahra, Sydney

== Collections ==
- Queen Victoria Museum and Art Gallery, Launceston, Tasmania
- Artbank, Sydney, Australia
- National Gallery of Victoria, Melbourne, Australia
- University of Technology, Sydney
- Marsden Collection Campbelltown Regional Art Gallery, Australia.

== Awards ==
- 2010 Australia Council and Australia Japan Foundation
- 2009 New Works Grant, Australia Council
- 2008 Walking and Art Residency, The Banff Centre, Canada
- 2007 Skills and Development Grant, Australia Council
- 2006 Echigo Tsumari Art Triennial
- 2006, International Visual Arts Strategy, Visual Arts Board, Australia Council
- 2005 New Work Grant, Visual Arts and Craft Board, Australia Council
- 2001 New Work Grant, Visual Arts and Craft Board, Australia Council
