= Walter Groves =

British actor (1856–1906)

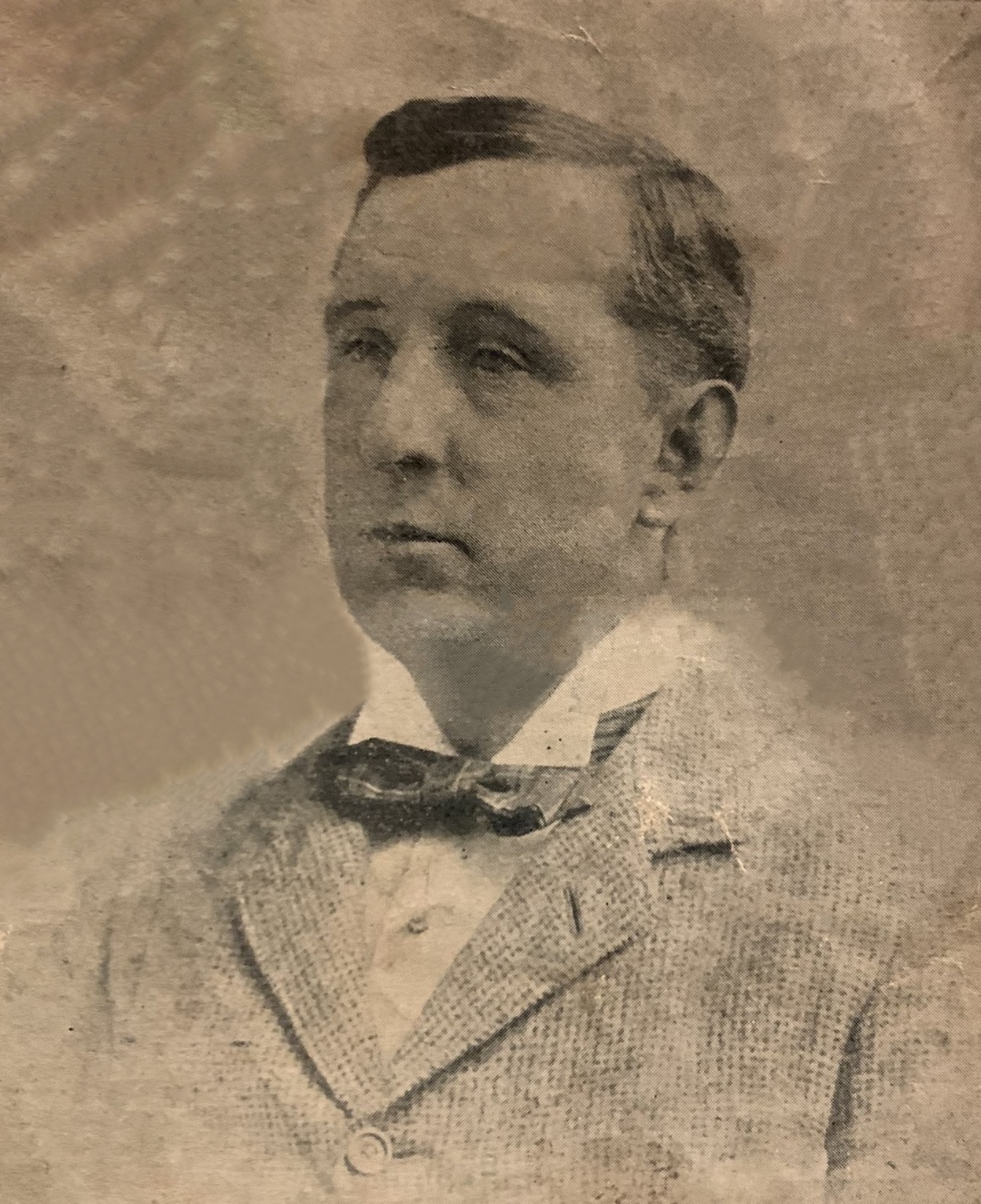
Walter Groves, c. 1900

Walter Groves (18 August 1856 – 4 March 1906) was a British actor, comedian, music hall artist, and writer of the late Victorian and early Edwardian eras.

== Biography ==
Groves was born in Manchester, England, to travelling actors Charles Groves (1807−1864) and Martha Bigg (1822−1915). His father was a working provincial actor of thirty years experience, while his mother had been a star of the London stage during childhood, appearing in the title role of Tom Thumb at the Theatre Royal, Haymarket and in Peter Bell, The Waggoner at the Royal Cobourg Theatre (today the Old Vic).

Groves was one of ten children in the Groves family, the majority of whom eventually went on to work in the theatre. His elder brother Charles Groves became a celebrated actor in the West End and on the Broadway stage.

The first known recorded appearance of Groves is an appearance in pantomime at the Theatre Royal, Newcastle upon Tyne, in Sinbad The Sailor. Groves played the part of Tornado and also performed the Harlequinade.

During his lengthy career in pantomime he showed great versatility, having played everything from clown to pantaloon to the pantomime dame. Groves appeared in this genre almost annually, with performers including George Mozart, Paul Cinquevalli and Vesta Tilley. In 1889 he was engaged by George Conquest to play Dame at The Surrey Theatre.

In 1900 Groves became the first spoken-word comedian hired by the Fred Karno Company (which was previously associated with silent, slapstick comedy to evade the theatre's censors) originating the role of Sgt. Lightning in the company's first full-length musical-comedy Her Majesty’s Guests. He reprised this performance for a brief period the following year, with the production renamed His Majesty’s Guests to reflect the death of Queen Victoria and the accession of Edward VII.

According to Fred Karno, Walter Groves devised the “funny walk” that Charlie Chaplin incorporated into his Little Tramp film persona, which then became world famous. Said Karno: "Charlie's peculiar walk is not original. It started with one of my comedians, a clever fellow named Walter Groves. Fred Kitchen then elaborated this walk and when Chaplin stepped into Kitchen's shoes and took his part over he also secured the legacy of the flat footed walk". In 2020 a radio documentary aired by the Australian Broadcasting Corporation, presented by Groves's great-granddaughter, explored this claim.

Groves also wrote, produced and starred in his own comedy sketches under the banner of the Walter Groves Company, which toured the British music hall circuit intermittently from 1887 up until his death in 1906. These works include Poor Pink, Artful Jim and Poole's Fantasie.

In March 1906, Groves died in Blackpool while on a recuperative holiday in an attempt to fight the lung condition that killed him.

Almost immediately after his death, his work was subject to plagiarism. His widow filed lawsuits to protect his work, and was obliged to buy advertising space in such industry newspapers as The Era and The Stage to announce his original works were fully protected under copyright law.

He married the actress Lizzie Aney and fathered two children. His descendants include the actress Lily Groves (daughter), the actor Donald Groves (grandson) and the writer Fiona Gruber (great-granddaughter).
