= Canal Cafe Theatre =

Fringe theatre venue in London, England

Coordinates: 51°31′15.5″N 0°11′3.5″W

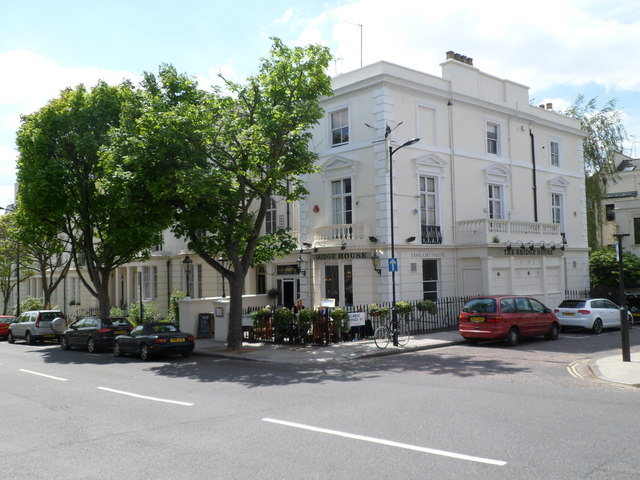
The Bridge House pub and Canal Cafe Theatre

The Canal Café Theatre is a 60-seat fringe theatre venue in Little Venice, London, England, specialising in comedy performances.

== Location ==
The theatre is above the Bridge House pub on the corner of Westbourne Terrace Road and Delamere Terrace, at the meeting point of the Grand Union and Regent's Canals. It is accessible from the Warwick Avenue, Royal Oak, and Paddington rail stations.

== History ==
The theatre was founded in 1985 as the residence for the NewsRevue satirical sketch show and remains its home. The show annually transfers to the Edinburgh Festival Fringe.

Other notable performances have been given by The Mighty Boosh, The League of Gentlemen, Waen Shepherd, The Consultants, Rhod Gilbert, Paul Chowdhry, Shappi Khorsandi, Pippa Evans, Sarah Lark, Cowards, and Frisky and Mannish.
