= The Slipper Room =

Variety theatre

Coordinates: 40.721338°N 73.988714°W

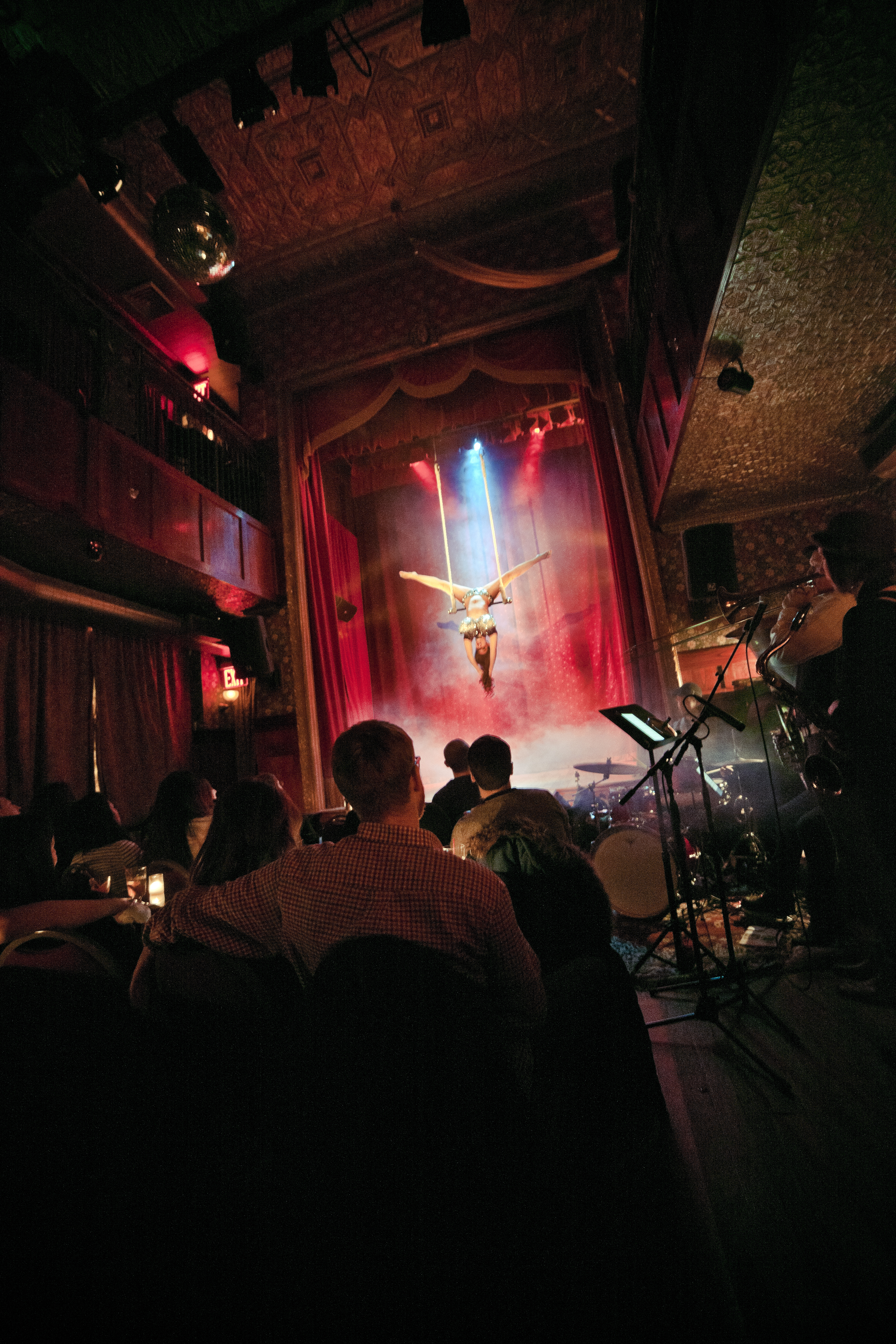
Interior of The Slipper Room

The Slipper Room is a variety theatre and house of burlesque, comedy and neo-vaudeville, located on the Lower East Side of Manhattan, New York City.

== Overview ==
The concept of performers and impresarios James and Camille Habacker, the venue first opened in 1999 when the neo-burlesque scene of New York was in its infancy, becoming the first venue built specifically to showcase the work of a new collective and designed to nurture emerging talent. The shows consist of performance artists, dancers, drag queens, vaudeville, variety and sideshow acts, often performing outrageous, messy and lewd routines. The Habackers encourage performers to push themselves to try out new work without fear of censorship.

The Village Voice describes the Slipper Room as "a glorious reinterpretation of classic mid-19th Century European opera houses, complete with fleur-de-lis wallpaper, sumptuous purple banquettes, and a soaring stage", while The New York Times advises the meek "to stay on the mezzanine", where "audience members on the stage level have been known to be licked, tickled and mocked". NYC.com observes the venue as being "instrumental in reviving—perhaps even creating—the burlesque community in New York City, for the first eleven years as the cozy, intimate cocktail lounge it once was, and now as the two-level burlesque theater and bar and it's become... a stunning paean to the Jazz Age with a stage that vaults the full two stories up, where balcony visitors get a bird's eye view of the action."

Writing in an August, 2000 edition of the Voice, the author Jackie Collins hailed the Slipper Room as "Heaven!", adding "It's a snazzy Orchard Street hangout where Hello, Dali!—a surreal tribute to the art of transsexualism—had us cheering on all fours. As the trannies tarted themselves up backstage, Amanda Lepore and Sophia Lamar performed deadpan magic tricks in panties; Tina Sparkles pushed her sequinned titties into an audience member's face in a vivid tribute to the Lion King, Candis Cayne climaxed Le Jazz Hot in a way skimpier ensemble than Julie Andrews could ever manage; and Gloria Wholesome shed her boa while dedicating Different Drum to George W. Bush (though Bush is generally this crowd's goal genital). The switcharoo finale had our female host, *BOB*, stripping behind a screen to reveal a huge prosthetic schlong, then declaring, "In the future, there is no gender!"

== Controversies, legal issues and reformation of cabaret laws ==
In 2001–2, the Slipper Room became a "poster lounge" for reforming the city cabaret laws after twice being forced to close due to the violation of New York City's Prohibition-era cabaret laws and regulations, under which it was illegal for people to dance without permission, on or off-stage, from the NY authorities. In a crackdown led by former NY mayor Rudy Giuliani, the Slipper Room was among a number of bars and clubs to be penalized. In May 2001 they were fined $150 and padlocked for the night when a Department of Consumer Affairs agent wrote them up for having a male go-go dancer on stage. In June 2002, a D.C.A agent "caught patrons dancing and hit the place with a $30,000 fine, later reduced to $6,000, again padlocking the place". After that penalty, the Slipper Room hung a "no dancing" sign inside the venue in an attempt to keep patrons from dancing. Camille Habacker stated it wasn't easy. "People at the bar would hear a good song and start shakin' it. We had to tell people to stop – they thought we were kidding". The Slipper Room, enlisting the help of a lawyer and co-forming the Legalize Dancing NYC coalition, prompted a change in the city's cabaret laws.

== Performers ==
Artists who have guested at the Slipper Room over the years have included such acts as Lady Gaga, Leonard Cohen, the Scissor Sisters and U2, while popular downtown performers Dirty Martini, Murray Hill and Matt Fraser often appear. Variety shows are regularly hosted by comedians Bradford Scobie, Matthew Holtzclaw and Matt Roper under the guise of various characters, and also by James Habacker himself.
