= Jeannie Bradbury =

British big band singer (1917–1967)

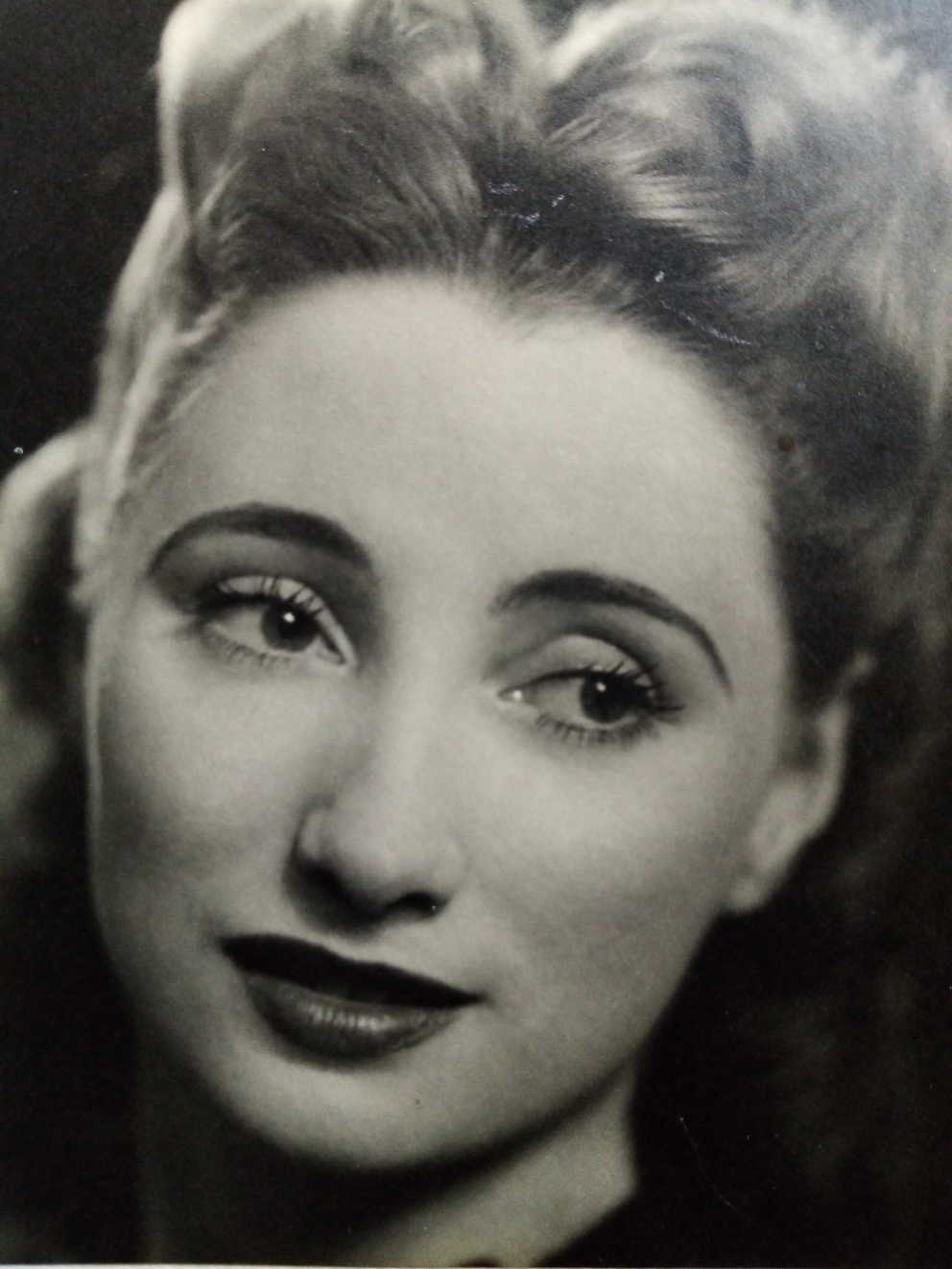
- Born: Jessie Lorenza Jean Bradbury; 30 October 1917; London, England
- Died: 15 June 1967 (aged 49); London, England
- Other names: Jean Bradbury, Jean Parry, Jessie Parry
- Occupations: BBC singer, Big band singer
- Spouse: Harry Parry (m. 1945; div. 1956)

Jeannie Bradbury (born Jessie Lorenza Jean Bradbury; 30 October 1917 – 15 June 1967), sometimes referred to as Jean Bradbury, was a British big band singer, best known for her appearances on BBC radio during the later years of World War II and into the 1950s, and for her association with the Welsh clarinetist and band leader Harry Parry, whom she married in 1945.

== Biography ==
Jeannie was born in Wandsworth, London, the daughter of Music Hall performer George Bradbury (known by the stage name George Sanford of the comedy team Sanford and Lyons) and his second wife Lorenza MacLennan.

Bradbury's first recorded broadcast for the BBC was in a General Forces Programme called I'll Play To You on Tuesday 9 August 1944, alongside Stéphane Grappelly and Robin Richmond, but got a break on the BBC feature Songs From The Shows while deputizing for Anne Ziegler. The musician Harry Parry, who was present for the broadcast, thought her to be a potential vocalist for his sextet. Bradbury subsequently appeared with Parry on a series of shows throughout the 1940s on BBC radio broadcasts including Late Night Dancing, Dancing Til Midnight, and Harry Parry. She was sometimes billed simply as Jean Bradbury in radio listings and on recordings.

In addition to a long-term residency at the London nightclub and restaurant Potomac at 40 Jermyn Street (today the location of Tramp), Bradbury sang with the Harry Parry Sextet in variety at the London Hippodrome, the Metropolitan Music Hall and throughout the English provinces. The couple toured the world, playing venues in India, the Far East and beyond.

In 1955 Parry filed for divorce in a highly publicized case, citing Bradbury's infidelity with the left-wing writer Frederic Mullally—a prominent member of the inner-circle of Stephen Ward, a central figure in the Profumo scandal which brought down the British government in 1963.

Harry Parry died alone in his Mayfair flat in October 1956, a few months after their divorce was finalized. The marriage produced no children.

Jeannie, whose career never recovered following the divorce scandal, married the shipbroker Michael Misroch in 1966, but died a year later from various forms of cancer.
