= Arthur Smith (comedian) =

English comedian and writer (born 1954)

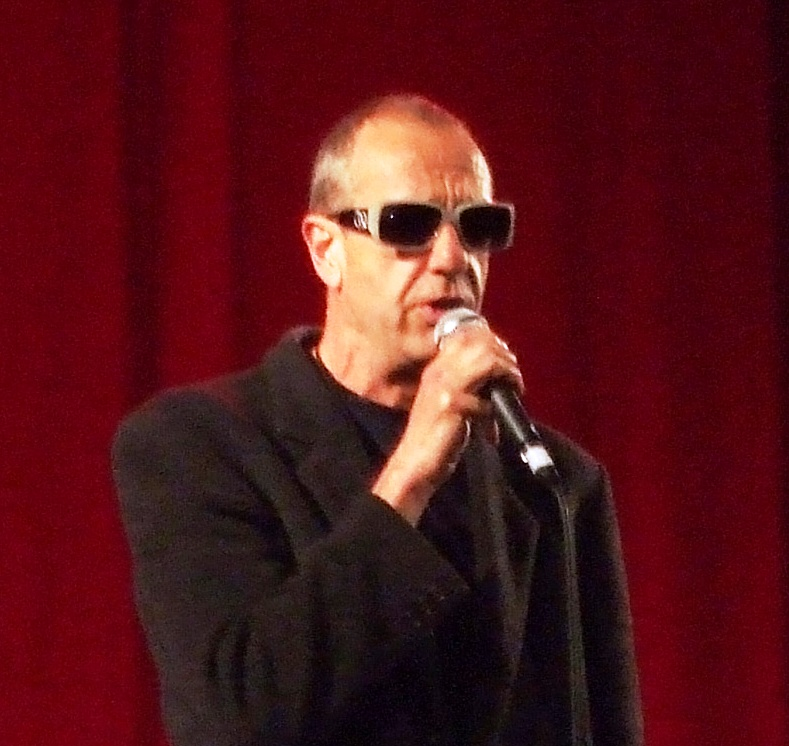
- Impersonating Leonard Cohen in the cabaret tent at the 2008 Glastonbury Festival
- Born: 27 November 1954 (age 71); London, England
- Education: University of East Anglia (BA)
- Occupations: Comedian, presenter, writer
- Years active: 1977–present
- Relatives: Richard Smith (brother)

Brian Arthur John Smith (born 27 November 1954) is an English alternative comedian, presenter and writer.

== Early life ==
Smith was born on 27 November 1954 in Bermondsey, south London. His eldest brother is Richard Smith, a medical doctor, editor and businessman. His younger brother is Nick Smith, a civil servant who was also a stand-up comic but in recent years has turned to amateur dramatics. Arthur was a student and school captain at The Roan School for Boys, a grammar school, now The John Roan School in Blackheath, London. He then studied at the University of East Anglia, where he was chairman of the poetry society, wrote for the student newspaper and contributed sketches for a student revue. He graduated with a 2:1 BA degree in Comparative literature in 1976.

== Career ==
Smith was one of many stand-up performers on the alternative comedy scene in the 1980s, and still performs today in much the same manner. He has regularly attended the Edinburgh Fringe comedy festival since 1977, and still comperes the long-running Hackney Empire New Act of the Year competition final. He has also written a body of serious or semi-serious work, including stage plays such as An Evening with Gary Lineker, which he cowrote with Chris England.

In addition to stand-up comedy, Smith has performed musical comedy shows such as Arthur Smith Sings Leonard Cohen (later broadcast on Radio 4). He returned to this theme for the Edinburgh Fringe in 2013 with "Arthur Smith Sings Leonard Cohen (Volume Too). He is also a radio presenter on such BBC Radio 4 programmes as Excess Baggage and Loose Ends, and appears on television comedy panel games. He took over as narrator of the TV series A Life of Grime after the death of John Peel and was one of the Grumpy Old Men in the television series of that name. Both of the latter two series used "What a Wonderful World" as their theme song. For Grumpy Old Men, Smith was one of the cast members who contributed to a montage rendition of the song.

In December 1985, Smith and Phil Nice made a short series of parody documentaries for Channel 4 television network called Arthur and Phil Go Off. One episode, titled "Nessie – Real or Pretend" about the Loch Ness Monster, was aired in America on the A&E cable channel in 1986.

In 1989, Smith provided voices for an Aardman Animations short called Ident with Nice and later. In 1989 he appeared in The Bill ("Quiet Life"). In the mid and late 1990s, he lent his voice to some television animations including the TV short The Animal Train as Jim Jam (veteran voice actor Rick Jones voiced the character in the US version), the BBC clay animated series Rex the Runt (also made by Aardman) as Arthur Dustcart in five episodes, and the British-French children's animated series Romuald the Reindeer as the big bully Clint.

One of Smith's more unusual roles was in the sitcom Red Dwarf in the episode "Backwards". He plays a bar manager on backwards Earth who has hired Kryten and Rimmer as a forward novelty act. He gave a speech (in reverse) blaming Kryten and Rimmer for starting a fight. If, however, the speech is played forwards, he is heard to be insulting the listener who has flipped the recording over trying to find out what he was saying ("What a poor sad life he's got").

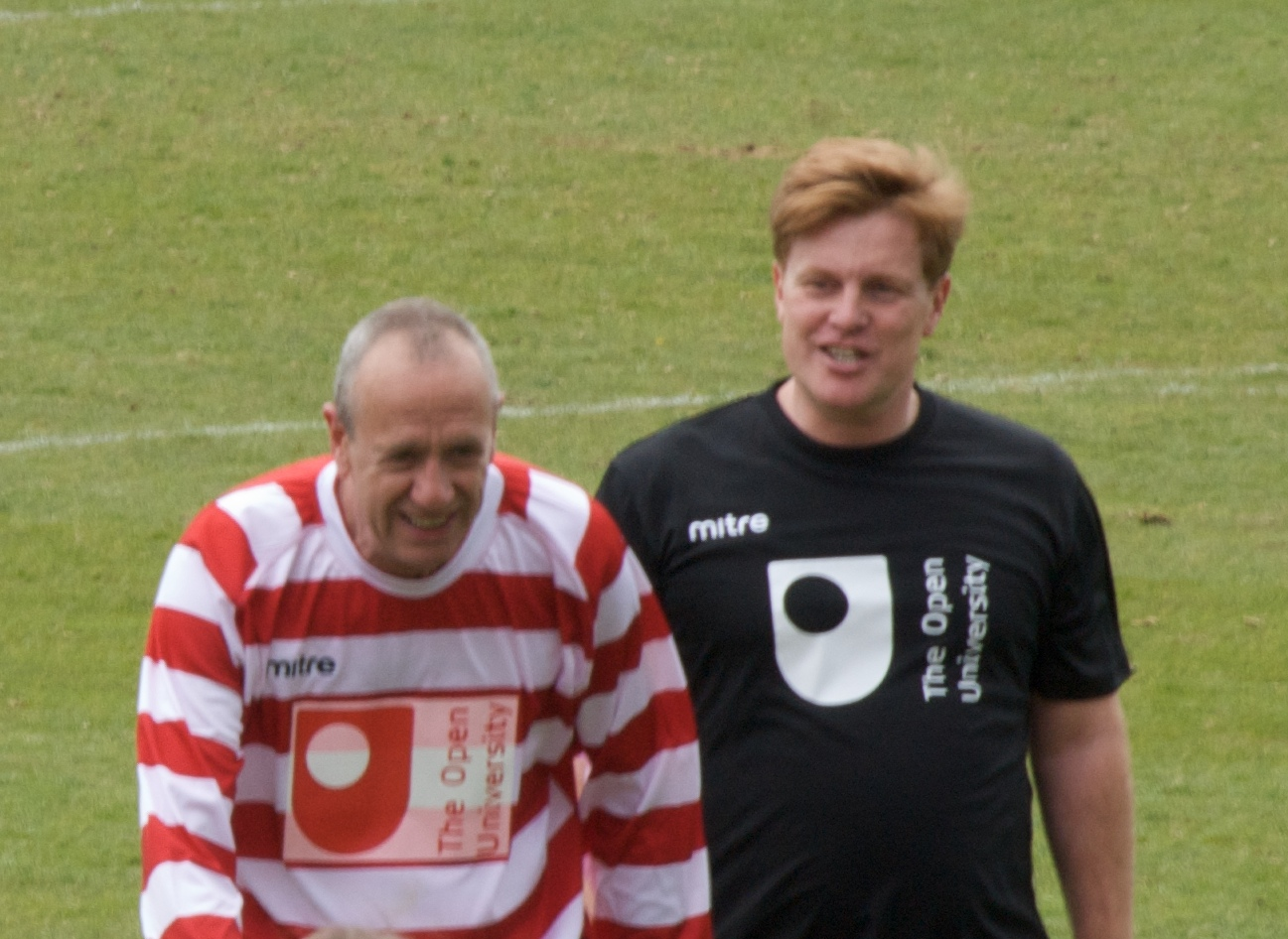
Smith being sent off during a charity football match in 2010

A night of watching football with Tony Hawks ended with him challenging Hawks to beat the entire Moldovan football team at tennis. Hawks took him up on this bet, and wrote a book about it. Hawks won the bet, and Smith had to stand on Balham High Road and sing the Moldovan National Anthem whilst naked.

Smith also appeared in a cameo role in the first series of the BBC science fiction radio comedy Married. He played a version of himself from a parallel universe who eked out a living as a children's party entertainer. This role expanded in the second and third series.

In 2006, Smith played "Clarrie" in the Doctor Who audio, The Kingmaker.

He is currently one of the hosts of "The Comedy Club" on BBC Radio 4 Extra and also narrates the BBC series Money for Nothing. He makes a cameo appearance in the music video of the song "Happy Goddamn Christmas", by Loretta Maine and Matt Roper, released on 13 December 2012 via BBC Three.

In August 2016, he appeared in the role of Mr Harman in the revival of the BBC sitcom Are You Being Served.

Debrett's lists his full books and publication list as Trench Kiss (1990), An Evening With Gary Lineker (with Chris England, 1992), Pointless Hoax (1997), Sit-Down Comedy (2003), That Which Is Not Said (poetry, 2006), and My Name is Daphne Fairfax (autobiography, 2009).

== Awards ==
In 2005, Smith turned down a lifetime-achievement award from the Perrier Award organisers. He said: "Comedians rather dislike the Perrier Awards and the public aren't interested. Basically, they wanted to tell me I was old and cool: well, I know that already, and anyway, my ego is bloated enough." In 2007, he went on to win the Panel Prize at the Edinburgh Fringe.

== Personal life ==
Smith has been a longtime resident of Du Cane Court in Balham, London, and has described himself as the "Night Mayor of Balham – I don't do days". In 2009, he broadcast a comedy series for BBC Radio 4 from his own home, Arthur Smith's Balham Bash.

As of 2009 he was engaged to Beth Kilcoyne, a performer and screenwriter, who co-wrote the BBC TV series Roger & Val Have Just Got In.

Smith is a socialist and a supporter of the Labour Party.

== Books ==
- Sit-Down Comedy (contributor to anthology, ed Malcolm Hardee & John Fleming) Ebury Press/Random House, 2003. ISBN 0-09-188924-3; ISBN 978-0-09-188924-1
- My Name is Daphne Fairfax (audiobook read by the author) Random House Audio, May 2009. ISBN 978-1-84657-179-4
- 100 Things I Meant to Tell You: Rants, Rhymes, & Reportage from the Original Grumpy Old Man Author AA Publishing, October 2019. ISBN 978-0749581947
