= UdderBELLY =

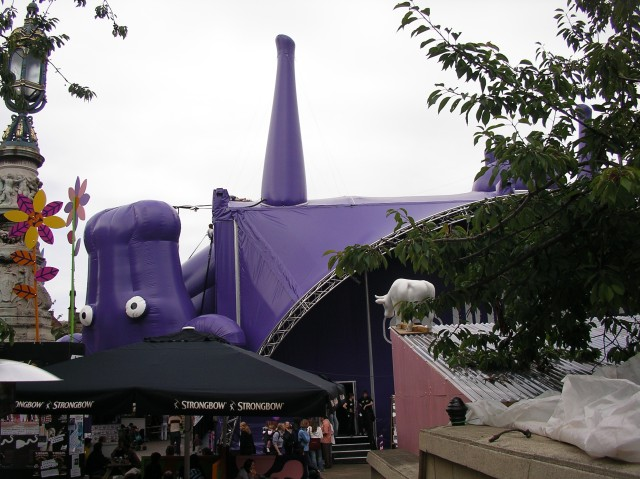
The E4 udderBELLY

The Udderbelly is an upside-down giant purple cow tent owned by the event venue and management company Underbelly, originally sponsored by E4 as the "E4 udderBELLY".

The Udderbelly can be used for a variety of different purposes as it can be adapted to contain a stage and all-seater 405 seat venue, or alternatively can be completely empty inside. The exterior skin can either be the upside-down purple cow, or alternatively a white, silver, or purple tent. The tent has an aluminum truss frame that is designed to be strong enough to carry several tonnes of weight in lighting and sound equipment.

It was first unveiled for the 2006 Edinburgh Festival Fringe and was situated in Bristo Square (which itself was converted into a large outdoor pub known as The Pasture). It also appeared in Brighton's Old Steine for the 2007 and 2008 Brighton Festival Fringe. It has since been a recurring event in the annual Edinburgh Fringe, and been installed on London's South Bank.

Upon its return to the Brighton Fringe in 2008, it brought with it a smaller adjoining venue known as the Udder Place.

The tent proved to be popular at both festivals, being named the best new venue by The Sunday Times.
