= Casadesus family =

Casadesus is the surname of a prominent French artistic family. Its members include:

- Francis Casadesus (1870–1954), composer and conductor
  - Jules-Raphaël Casadesus, journalist, writer
    - Odette Casadesus (1925–1999), writer, poet
- Robert-Guillaume Casadesus (1878–1940), composer and singer known as "Robert Casa"
  - Robert Casadesus (1899–1972), pianist and composer
  - Gaby Casadesus (1901–1999), pianist, wife of Robert Casadesus
    - Jean Casadesus (1927–1972), pianist, son of Robert and Gaby Casadesus
- Henri Casadesus (1879–1947), violist and composer
  - Catherine Casadesus (1902–1985), violinist
  - Jacqueline Casadesus (1903–1976), pianist, singer and actress
  - Christian Casadesus (1912–2014), actor, theatre manager
  - Gisèle Casadesus (1914–2017), actress, daughter of Henri Casadesus
    - Jean-Claude Casadesus (born 1935), conductor, son of Gisèle Casadesus
      - Caroline Casadesus (born 1962), lyric soprano, daughter of Jean-Claude Casadesus
      - Olivier Casadesus (born 1970), actor and model, son of Jean-Claude Casadesus
    - Martine Pascal (born 1939), actress, daughter of Gisèle Casadesus
    - Béatrice Casadesus (born 1942), painter and sculptor, daughter of Gisèle Casadesus
    - Dominique Probst (born 1954), composer, son of Gisèle Casadesus
  - Bernard Casadesus (1924–1994), singer, musicologist
- Marcel Casadesus (1882–1914), cellist
  - Claude Casadesus (1913–1997), cellist
- Marius Casadesus (1892–1981), violinist and composer
  - Mathilde Casadesus (1931–1965), actress
  - Gréco Casadesus (born 1951), composer

== See also ==
- Víctor Casadesús (born 1985), Spanish football player
- List of musical families (classical music)
