= Robert-Guillaume Casadesus =

Robert Gabriel Guillaume Casadesus, known as Robert Casa (23 January 1878 in Paris, France – 30 May 1940) was a French composer, singer and stage and film actor. He was a member of a prominent French musical family, and best known today as the father of the famous classical pianist Robert Casadesus. He was the brother of Henri Casadesus and Marius Casadesus, and grandfather of Jean Casadesus. He composed several songs, instrumental pieces, and operettas, including La Ribaude and La Reine de l'Or.

== Selected filmography ==
- La Maison de la Fléche (1930)
- Luck (1931)
- Ciboulette (1933)
- Counsel for Romance (1936)
