= Yves Mirande =

French screenwriter and film director (1876–1957)

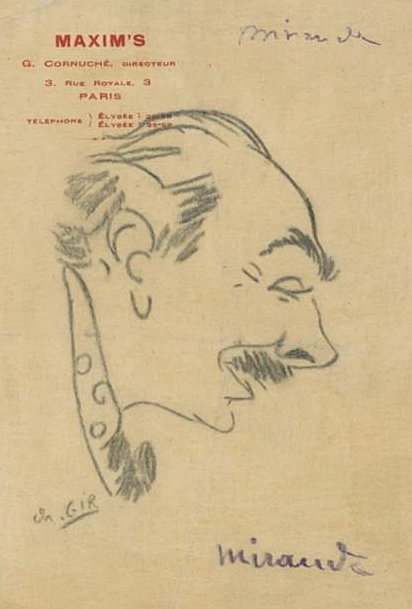
- Caricature of Yves Mirande by Charles Gir
- Born: May 8, 1876; Bagneux, Maine-et-Loire, France
- Died: March 17, 1957 (aged 80); Paris, France
- Occupations: Screenwriter, director, actor, producer

Yves Mirande (Bagneux, 8 May 1876 – 17 March 1957) was a French screenwriter, director, actor, and producer.

== Career ==
Yves Mirande began his acting career in the theater, transitioning to movies in the silent era.

== Filmography ==
- She Wolves, directed by Maurice Elvey (Silent, 1925, based on the play Un homme en habit)
- Evening Clothes, directed by Luther Reed (Silent, 1927, based on the play Un homme en habit)
- The Porter from Maxim's, directed by Roger Lion and Nicolas Rimsky (Silent, 1927, based on the play Le Chasseur de chez Maxim's)
- Trois jeunes filles nues, directed by Robert Boudrioz (Silent, 1929, based on the operetta Trois jeunes filles nues)
- Kiss Me, directed by Robert Péguy (Silent, 1929, based on the play Embrassez-moi)
- The Wonderful Day, directed by René Barberis (Silent, 1929, based on the play La Merveilleuse Journée)
- L'Arpète, directed by Émile-Bernard Donatien (Silent, 1929, based on the play L'Arpète)
- A Hole in the Wall, directed by René Barberis (French, 1930, based on the play Le Trou dans le mur)
  - När rosorna slå ut, directed by Edvin Adolphson (Swedish, 1930, based on the play Le Trou dans le mur)
  - A Lucky Man, directed by Benito Perojo (Spanish, 1930, based on the play Le Trou dans le mur)
- The Matrimonial Bed, directed by Michael Curtiz (English, 1930, based on the play Au premier de ces messieurs)
- The Man in Evening Clothes, directed by René Guissart (French, 1931, based on the play Un homme en habit)
  - A Gentleman in Tails, directed by Roger Capellani and Carlos San Martín (Spanish, 1931, based on the play Un homme en habit)
- To Live Happily, directed by Claudio de la Torre (French, 1932, based on the play Pour vivre heureux)
- Simone Is Like That, directed by Karl Anton (French, 1932, based on the play Simone est comme ça)
- Kiss Me, directed by Léon Mathot (French, 1932, based on the play Embrassez-moi)
- Mon cœur balance, directed by René Guissart (French, 1932, based on the play Une femme dans un lit)
- The Wonderful Day, directed by Yves Mirande and Robert Wyler (French, 1932, based on the play La Merveilleuse Journée)
- The Porter from Maxim's, directed by Karl Anton (French, 1933, based on the play Le Chasseur de chez Maxim's)
- Je te confie ma femme, directed by René Guissart (French, 1933, based on the play La Femme de mon ami)
- Un Petit Trou pas cher, directed by Pierre-Jean Ducis (French, 1934, based on the play Un petit trou pas cher)
- Mr. What's-His-Name?, directed by Ralph Ince (English, 1935, based on the play Au premier de ces messieurs)
- It Happened in Paris, directed by Carol Reed and Robert Wyler (English, 1935, based on the play L'Arpète)
- The Porter from Maxim's, directed by Maurice Cammage (French, 1939, based on the play Le Chasseur de chez Maxim's)
- Kisses for Breakfast, directed by Lewis Seiler (English, 1941, based on the play Au premier de ces messieurs)
- A Hole in the Wall, directed by Émile Couzinet (French, 1950, based on the play Le Trou dans le mur)
- Ce coquin d'Anatole, directed by Émile Couzinet (French, 1951, based on the play La Grande vie)
- The Porter from Maxim's, directed by Henri Diamant-Berger (French, 1953, based on the play Le Chasseur de chez Maxim's)
- The Cucuroux Family, directed by Émile Couzinet (French, 1953, based on the play Une femme dans un lit)
- The Porter from Maxim's, directed by Claude Vital (French, 1976, based on the play Le Chasseur de chez Maxim's)
- The Wonderful Day, directed by Claude Vital (French, 1980, based on the play La Merveilleuse Journée)

=== As screenwriter ===
- 1909 : Octave (Short film)
- 1909 : Le Petit qui a faim (Short film)
- 1910 : La Tournée des grands ducs (Short film)
- 1916 : The Gold Chignon
- 1930 : Le Spectre vert
- 1930 : Si l'empereur savait ça
- 1930 : Olympia
- 1931 : Le Père célibataire
- 1931 : Révolte dans la prison
- 1931 : Luck (1931 film)
- 1932 : You Will Be a Duchess
- 1932 : A Father Without Knowing It
- 1932 : Tumultes
- 1932 : Une brune piquante (Short film)
- 1932 : La Perle
- 1933 : Charlemagne
- 1934 : Le Roi des Champs-Élysées
- 1934 : Le Cavalier Lafleur
- 1935 : Le Billet de mille
- 1935 : Quelle drôle de gosse!
- 1935 : Little One
- 1935 : Man of the Moment
- 1935 : Princesse Tam-Tam
- 1935 : Baccara
- 1936 : Excursion Train
- 1936 : Une gueule en or
- 1936 : Seven Men, One Woman
- 1936 : Le Grand Refrain
- 1936 : Au son des guitares
- 1936 : Ménilmontant
- 1936 : Tout va très bien madame la marquise
- 1937 : À nous deux, madame la vie
- 1937 : Le Cantinier de la coloniale
- 1937 : Life Dances On
- 1938 : Sweet Devil
- 1938 : Four in the Morning
- 1938 : The President
- 1938 : Café de Paris
- 1939 : Extenuating Circumstances
- 1939 : The Spirit of Sidi-Brahim
- 1940 : Paris-New York
- 1940 : They Were Twelve Women
- 1940 : Moulin Rouge
- 1941 : L'An 40
- 1941 : The Acrobat
- 1941 : Strange Suzy
- 1941 : Ce n'est pas moi
- 1942 : The Woman I Loved Most
- 1942 : Soyez les bienvenus
- 1942 : At Your Command, Madame
- 1942 : The Benefactor
- 1942 : Les Petits Riens
- 1943 : Des jeunes filles dans la nuit
- 1943 : The Exile's Song
- 1945 : St. Val's Mystery
- 1947 : Pas un mot à la reine mère
- 1949 : The Ladies in the Green Hats
- 1949 : Cage of Girls
- 1950 : The Bread Peddler
- 1954 : It's the Paris Life
- 1954 : The Two Orphans

=== Director ===
- 1932 : The Wonderful Day
- 1935 : Baccara
- 1936 : Seven Men, One Woman
- 1936 : The Great Refrain
- 1936 : The Bureaucrats
- 1937 : À nous deux, madame la vie
- 1938 : Café de Paris
- 1939 : Behind the Facade
- 1940 : Paris-New York
- 1940 : Moulin-Rouge

=== Actor ===
- 1927: L'Arpète, written with Gustave Quinson
- 1933: The Porter from Maxim's by Karl Anton
- 1939: Behind the Facade by Georges Lacombe and Yves Mirande, as Le clochard sur le banc
- 1942: Les Petits Riens by Raymond Leboursier, as Brignolles

=== Producer ===
- 1933 : Je te confie ma femme

== Theatre work ==
=== Author ===
- 1909 : Un petit trou pas cher (with Henri Caen), Comédie-Royale
- 1909 : Ma gosse (with Henri Caen)
- 1910 : Les Jeux sont faits? (with Guillaume Wolff), Théâtre Michel
- 1912 : Pour vivre heureux (with André Rivoire), Théâtre de la Renaissance
- 1920 : Un homme en habit (with André Picard), Théâtre des Variétés
- 1920 : La Femme de mon ami (with Henri Géroule), Théâtre Michel
- 1920 : Le Chasseur de chez Maxim's (with Gustave Quinson), Théâtre du Palais-Royal
- 1921 : Simone est comme ça (with Alexis Madis), Théâtre des Capucines
- 1922 : La Merveilleuse Journée (with Gustave Quinson), Théâtre du Palais-Royal
- 1922 : Pourquoi m'as-tu fait ça? (with Alexis Madis and Gustave Quinson), Théâtre des Capucines
- 1923 : Embrassez-moi (with Tristan Bernard and Gustave Quinson), Théâtre du Palais-Royal
- 1925 : Trois jeunes filles nues (with Raoul Moretti and Albert Willemetz), Théâtre des Bouffes-Parisiens
- 1925 : Voulez-vous être ma femme? (by Jacques Richepin, adaptation by Yves Mirande), Théâtre de la Renaissance
- 1926 : Au premier de ces messieurs (with André Mouëzy-Éon), Théâtre du Palais-Royal
- 1927 : Une femme dans un lit (with Gustave Quinson), Théâtre du Palais-Royal
- 1927 : L'Arpète (with Gustave Quinson), Théâtre La Scala
- 1929 : Le Trou dans le mur, Théâtre de la Michodière
- 1929 : La Grande vie (with Henri Géroule), Théâtre du Palais-Royal
- 1946 : Ce soir je suis garçon! (with André Mouëzy-Éon), Théâtre Antoine

=== Comedian ===
- 1943 : À la gloire d'Antoine by Sacha Guitry, Théâtre Antoine

=== Scenographer ===
- 1949 : Le Petit by Tristan Bernard, Théâtre Antoine
