= The Wonderful Day (1932 film) =

1932 film

- Directed by: Yves Mirande; Robert Wyler
- Written by: Yves Mirande (play and screenplay); Gustave Quinson
- Produced by: Bernard Natan; Emile Natan
- Starring: Frédéric Duvallès; Florelle; Milly Mathis
- Cinematography: Raymond Agnel; René Colas
- Edited by: Léonide Moguy
- Music by: Jane Bos
- Production company: Pathé-Natan
- Distributed by: Pathé-Natan
- Release date: 23 November 1932
- Running time: 87 minutes
- Country: France
- Language: French

The Wonderful Day (French: La merveilleuse journée) is a 1932 French comedy film directed by Yves Mirande and Robert Wyler and starring Frédéric Duvallès, Florelle and Milly Mathis. It is a remake of the 1929 silent film of the same title. A further adaptation The Wonderful Day was released in 1980.

The film's sets were designed by the art director Lucien Aguettand.

== Cast ==
In alphabetical order

- André Alerme as Le docteur
- Jean Aquistapace as M. Pinède - le pharmacien
- Jeanne Bernard
- Lucien Brulé as Felloux
- Marguerite de Morlaye
- Frédéric Duvallès as Blaise - l'aide-pharmacien
- Fichel as Le bijoutier
- Florelle as Gladys
- Mona Goya as La jeune femme
- Christian Gérard
- Anna Lefeuvrier
- Milly Mathis as Mme Pinède - la pharmacienne
- Marcel Maupi as Octave
- Marthe Riche

== Bibliography ==
- Crisp, Colin. Genre, Myth and Convention in the French Cinema, 1929-1939. Indiana University Press, 2002.
