= Gréco Casadesus =

French composer

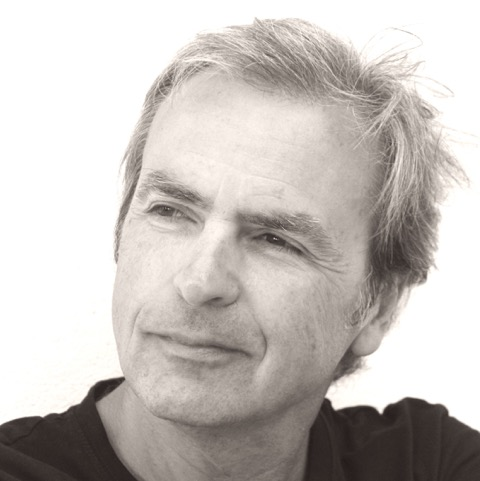

Background information
- Born: 13 August 1951 (age 75); Paris, France
- Genre: Film score
- Occupations: Composer; Producer; Artistic Director
- Website: greco-casadesus.com

Gréco Casadesus (born 13 August 1951) is a French composer who composes film scores. Born in Paris to a large family of artists (musicians, conductors, performers, actors, composers, painters, and writers), he has composed over a hundred musical creations for television, cinema, performances, and theatre.

In his early years, he started out as an artistic director for EMI Classics, then set out to create music for the stage (1983–1997). From 1984 on, he started writing music for TV and cinema with a style combining orchestral music and electronics (synthesizers and computer music).

Casadesus composed soundtracks for a diverse range of productions, such as Divertimento, with Kellan Lutz, Torrey DeVitto, Ola Rapace, Götz Otto by Keyvan Sheikhalishahi, The Climb, a fiction movie by the American director Bob Swaim, the animated film Babar: King of the Elephants, adapted from the classic French comic by Jean de Brunhof, or the TV series Jesus by Serge Moati. He also wrote seven hours of music for the restored version of the 1921 film Les Trois Mousquetaires, by Henri Diamant-Berger.

Fascinated by the genius of Étienne-Jules Marey (1830–1904), inventor of the first moving images, he wrote the symphonic suite Sept Mouvements de Vie in 2008, performed by an orchestra, as images by Marey were projected on a film screen. More recently, he composed the music score for several documentary films, such as La Guerre d'Hollywood, Jack London, une aventure américaine, and the TV series Jusqu'au dernier.

In 2002, he founded the Union des Compositeurs de Musiques de Films (UCMF), a lobbying group defending the interests of music creators. He remained its president until 2005, and then its honorary chairman. In 2003, Casadesus was nominated "Personality of the year" by the trade journal Musique Info Hebdo. In 2012 he was awarded the Henri-Langlois Award.

== Biography ==
=== Early life and education ===
Casadesus grew up in a family of artists. His father, Marius Casadesus (1892–1981), was a violinist and a composer, and his mother, Gladys Thibaud (1928), was a pianist. He began studying music with his parents, learning the violin with his father at the age of 3, and piano at age 5 with his mother.

He grew up in Montmartre (Casadesus Square) in Paris, and from the age of 9 years old, he studied at the Conservatoire de Paris, training 8 hours daily, which earned him the First Medal in theory as well as a prize in piano at the Versailles Conservatory.

He started his career at the age of age 22 as an artistic director at EMI Classics, where he oversaw the recording of over 200 albums including artists such as Mstislav Rostropovich, Leonard Bernstein and Georges Prêtre.

By age 30, he wrote and recorded his first album, Voyage immobile, but after his second album, Les Oiseaux de rivière noire (1982), he focused on composing for the cinema and stage.

=== Composing for the stage and for images ===
Between 1983 and 1997, he composed at least 22 musical creations for the stage, mainly for Jean Danet's Les Tréteaux de France theatre company and the Théâtre du Marais of Jacques Mauclair. In particular, he composed the music for Molière's play, L'Avare, which was awarded a Molière Award in 1989 for the direction by Mauclair.

Casadesus was then hired by the American film director Bob Swaim in 1997 to replace the composer John Barry and write the soundtrack for his feature film, The Climb.

In 1998, he composed the very first original soundtrack for Marie et le vin, a book by Claire Huynen published by Éditions du Cherche-Midi. The following year, Casadesus wrote the soundtrack for the cartoon Babar: King of the Elephants, by Canadian director Raymond Jafelice. In 1999, he wrote the score for the TV project, Jésus, directed by Serge Moati. It reached an audience of 10 million viewers during its unique broadcast, on December 25 1999, on France's main television channel. In 2001, he wrote seven hours of music for the restored version of the 1921 film Les Trois Mousquetaires, an adaptation of the French classic by Alexandre Dumas. Following this experience, he produced a live performance designed for children, entitled Les Trois Mousquetaires font du Cinéma, a production mixing theatre, cinema and musical theatre.

=== Leading large projects ===
In 2002 he founded the French association of composers, Union des Compositeurs de Musiques de Films (UCMF), which he led until 2005. He is UCMF's Honorary Chairman, along with Bernard Grimaldi. Casadesus then founded the production and publishing company Opus Millésime, and produced a film and a CD as a tribute to his cousin, the pianist and composer Robert Casadesus (1899–1972). In January 2004, he was nominated "personality of the year" by the music magazine Musique Info Hebdo.

During the 2007 Cannes Film Festival, Casadesus' symphony Sept Mouvements de Vie, dedicated to the life and work of the photographer Étienne-Jules Marey, was played by the Orchestre Régional de Cannes Provence-Alpes-Côte d'Azur, conducted by Philippe Bender. He wrote the missing movements of his symphony in 2008. The resulting "concert of images", using Marey's antique photos edited by director Sylvie-Jeanne Gander, was performed at the Dijon film festival, Rencontres cinématographiques de Dijon. This symphonical suite was published by Cezame Music Agency with the title Movements of Life, and a series of three films about the Marey project was released the following year. This project initiated a collaboration with the music label Cezame, run by Frédéric Leibovitz and Françoise Marchesseau, resulting in the publication of over 200 of his music tracks over the years.

=== Composing for documentary films ===
Casadesus composed soundtracks for various documentary films in France, including for directors Christian Zerbib (En terre étrangère and Nos ancêtres les Gauloises), Michel Viotte (La guerre d'Hollywood and Jack London, une aventure américaine), and William Karel (Jusqu'au dernier : La destruction des Juifs d'Europe). This last project was inspired by the 70th anniversary of the liberation of Auschwitz concentration camp. For this project, he composed several orchestral scores to be played by the American clarinetist David Krakauer. His work with Krakauer was also followed by a show at the French radio studios, France Musique. Both the soundtrack for the three TV films produced for this documentary project, and the Krakauer album, were published by Cézame.

Casadesus was awarded the Henri Langlois Award for his career in 2012.

In 2013 he created the Music Score Lab ("Le laboratoire de musique de films") along with Cristal Productions and the La Rochelle TV film festival (Festival de la fiction TV de La Rochelle). This yearly training allows selected composers to compose a soundtrack for a film sequence, and gives way to a small concert, with an orchestra playing in front of an audience the music composed by the trainees, synchronized with the images.

From 2013 to 2015, Casadesus headed the Sacem's TV Commission (Commission de l'Audiovisuel).

== Works ==
Casadesus has written hundreds of original scores for theatre, film, television, concerts and other stage performances. He also has ventured into film production.

=== Albums ===
Casadesus style includes mixing acoustic instruments and electronic sound effects. Since 2008, he has contributed to various albums from Cezame's catalogue (Marines, Seascapes, American Road Book, Paysages avec cordes, Motivation & Inspiration, Historical Heritage, 1914 : La grande guerre, Sense and Sensibility, Inspiring Cinematic Choirs, Western, Scandal & Gossip, Freaky Frolics)

- 1980 : Voyage immobile
- 1982 : Les oiseaux de rivière noire
- 1986 : Carte blanche à Gréco Casadesus
- 1995 : Projections
- 1997 : The Climb
- 1998 : Marie et le vin (Un roman et sa musique)
- 1999 : Babar, king of the elephants
- 2003 : Symphonic Nirvana
- 2005 : Les Trois Mousquetaires
- 2009 : Suppléments d'âme
- 2015 : David Krakauer plays Greco Casadesus
- 2016 : Movements of Life

=== Theatre ===
Greco Casadesus dedicated 14 years of his life to the stage.

- 1983 : The Cherry Orchard, by Anton Tchekhov, for Tréteaux de France.
- 1983 : Exit the King, by Eugène Ionesco, for Théâtre du Marais
- 1984 : Androcles and the Lion, by George Bernard Shaw, for Théâtre du Marais
- 1984 : Marshall, nous voilà! by Bruno Laurent, for Théâtre du Sentier des Halles
- 1986 : Bajazet, by Racine, for Carré Silvia Monfort
- 1986 : La comédie sans titre, by Italo Svevo, for Théâtre du Marais
- 1987 : Britannicus, by Racine, for Carré Silvia Monfort
- 1987 : It's a Family Affair-We'll Settle It Ourselves, by Alexander Ostrovski, for Théâtre du Marais
- 1987 : Guillaume ou les Quatre saisons d'un conquérant, by Jean-Pierre Nortel, for Tréteaux de France
- 1988 : The Lark (L'Alouette), by Jean Anouilh, for Tréteaux de France
- 1988 : The Prince of Homburg, by Heinrich von Kleist, for Théâtre Mouffetard
- 1989 : L'Avare (The Miser), by Molière, for Théâtre du Marais
- 1989 : Le Mariage de Figaro, by Beaumarchais, for Tréteaux de France
- 1990 : La Guerre de Troie n'aura pas lieu (The Trojan War Will Not Take Place), by Jean Giraudoux, for Tréteaux de France
- 1991 : Each In His Own Way, by Luigi Pirandello, for Tréteaux de France
- 1991 : Laetitia, by Peter Shaffer, for Théâtre du Rond-Point
- 1992 : Tartuffe, by Molière, for Tréteaux de France
- 1993 : L'Aiglon, by Edmond Rostand, for Tréteaux de France
- 1995 : Lorenzaccio, by Alfred de Musset, for Tréteaux de France
- 1995 : Christmas at the Cupiello's, by Eduardo de Filippo, for Théâtre du Marais
- 1997 : Une répétition au théâtre du crime, by Jacques Mauclair, for Théâtre du Marais

=== Television and Film ===
He composed for some works by the French filmmaker Keyvan Sheikhalishahi, Vesper with Götz Otto, Nox with Matt Passmore and Brigitte Millar, and Divertimento, with Kellan Lutz, Torrey DeVitto, Ola Rapace, Götz Otto, Christian Hillborg and Ellie Heydon.

- 1984 - 1985 : L'homme au képi noir (TV series)
- 1984 : André Moleux, peintre, by Gérard Sergues
- 1985 : Maestro, by Serge Korber
- 1985 : Tant qu'il y aura des cerfs, by Laurent Charbonnier
- 1986 : Fred Connexion, by Serge Korber
- 1986 : Les conquérants de l'impossible : portrait de groupe, by Bernard Choquet and Bernard Dumont
- 1986 : Chinook, by Christian Zuccarelli
- 1987 : Cordée canine, by Christian Zuccarelli
- 1987 : Nuit d'enfer, by Philippe Guillaume
- 1988 - 1989 : Mystères et bulles de gomme, by Bernard Dumont (TV series)
- 1989 to 1994 : Intrigues, mésaventures, passion, côté cœur (TV series)
- 1990 : Appelez-moi Tonton, by Dominique Baron
- 1992 : La montée au pouvoir des femmes, by Ghislaine Guide
- 1992 : Cérémonie religieuse, by Bernard Dumont
- 1992 : Le passage du Nord-Ouest, by Bernard Dumont
- 1993 : Le poids du corps, by Christine François
- 1993 : Les dératisseurs, by Bernard Dumont
- 1993 : Meurtre à ciel ouvert, by Jean-Marc Seban
- 1994 : Meurtre à l'université, by Jean-Marc Seban
- 1995 : Le silence de Lesbos, by Ghislaine Guidez
- 1995 : Les louves, by Jean-Marc Seban
- 1995 : Un mort sur le pavé, by Jean-Marc Seban
- 1995 : Le Match de notre vie. by Gareth Davies
- 1996 : So It Is (If You Think So), by Luigi Pirandello
- 1996 : La Rumeur, by Étienne Périer
- 1996 : La passe-montagne, by Jean-Marc Seban
- 1997 : The Climb, by Bob Swaim
- 1998 : Babar, King of the elephants, by Raymond Jafelice
- 1998 : Les legs, by Bernard Dumont
- 1998 : Le dernier fils, by Étienne Périer
- 2000 : L'Enfant de la honte, by Claudio Tonetti
- 2000 : Que reste-t-il..., by Étienne Périer
- 2000 : La vie à plein temps, by Serge Moati
- 2001 : Jésus, by Serge Moati
- 2001 : Les Trois Mousquetaires, by Henri Diamant-Berger
- 2009 : En terre étrangère. by Christian Zerbib
- 2010 : Petit creux (série TV, 104 épisodes)
- 2011 à 2013 : Le quiz de Zack (TV series)
- 2011 : Nos ancêtres les Gauloises, by Christian Zerbib
- 2013 : La Guerre d'Hollywood, by Michel Viotte
- 2014 : Jusqu'au dernier, by William Karel
- 2015 : Ta Mère! by Touria Benzari
- 2016 : La face, by Marc Rivière
- 2017 : Vesper, by Keyvan Sheikhalishahi
- 2019: Nox by Keyvan Sheikhalishahi
- 2020: Divertimento, by Keyvan Sheikhalishahi
