= Gisèle Casadesus =

French actress (1914–2017)

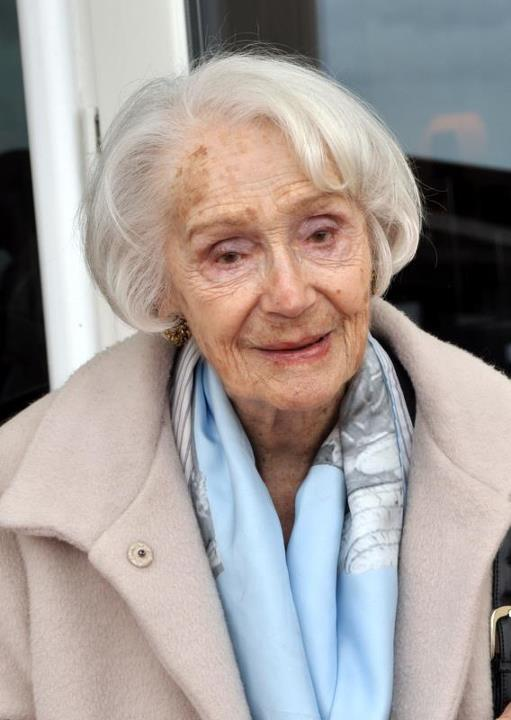
- Casadesus at the Cabourg Film Festival, 2012
- Born: Gisèle Tatiana Casadesus; 14 June 1914; Paris, France
- Died: 24 September 2017 (aged 103); Paris, France
- Occupation: Actress
- Years active: 1934–2017
- Known for: The Children of the Marshland by Jean Becker My Afternoons with Margueritte by Jean Becker Sarah's Key by Gilles Paquet-Brenner
- Spouse: Lucien Pascal (m. 1934; died 2006)
- Children: Jean-Claude Casadesus; Martine Pascal; Béatrice Casadesus; Dominique Probst
- Father: Henri Casadesus
- Relatives: Christian Casadesus (older brother); Caroline Casadesus (granddaughter); Olivier Casadesus (grandson); Sebastian Copeland (grandson)

Gisèle Tatiana Casadesus (14 June 1914 – 24 September 2017) was a French actress who appeared in numerous theatre and film productions. She was an honorary member of the Sociétaires of the Comédie-Française, Grand Officer of the Legion of Honor, Officer of the Ordre des Arts et des Lettres, and Grand-Croix of the National Order of Merit. In a career spanning more than 80 years, Casadesus appeared in more than a dozen films after turning 90.

== Life and career ==
Born into a family of artists in the 18th arrondissement of Paris, Gisèle was the daughter of musician, composer and conductor Henri Casadesus and harpist Marie-Louise Beetz, her older brother was actor Christian Casadesus. After receiving first prize in acting at French National Academy of Dramatic Arts at the age of twenty, Casadesus joined the Comédie-Française in 1934. The same year, she married the actor Lucien Pascal (born Lucien Probst), with whom she had four children: Jean-Claude (1935), Martine (1939), Béatrice (1942) and Dominique (1954), all artists. She became the 400th member of the Comédie-Française on 1 January 1939, and honorary member on 15 April 1967.

In cinema, Pierre Billon hired her in 1943 to play the role of Clotilde Grandlieus in Vautrin, adapted from Balzac's novel, alongside Michel Simon, and in 1946 for the role of Mary in L'Homme au chapeau rond, alongside Raimu.

In 1971 she was Countess Eguzon in La Belle Aventure, participated in Le Mouton enragé by Michel Deville, played the role of Nicole Leguen, wife of Jean Gabin in Verdict (1974) by André Cayatte, and the mother of Claude Jade in Les Robots pensants (1976).

Again with Claude Jade, she was Mamie Rose (1976), the "grand-mère au pair" in the film by Pierre Goutas, her greatest role. It is followed by her Catherine in Un crime de notre temps (1977) by Gabriel Axel. Claude Lelouch engaged her in 1996 for the role of Clara Blanc, mother of Bernard Tapie, in Hommes, femmes, mode d'emploi. In Aïe (2000), she is the mother of André Dussollier, and in Valérie Lemercier's comedy Palais Royal (2005) she plays the queen mother. She was Margueritte ("with two ts") alongside Gérard Depardieu in Jean Becker's My Afternoons with Margueritte (2010).

== Later role and award honours ==
In 2013, aged 99, Casadesus acted alongside Anne Consigny and Marie Kremer in Sous le figuier directed by Anne-Marie Étienne. Casadesus was awarded Grand Officer of the Legion of Honour on 29 March 2013.

She was also an Officer of the Ordre des Arts et des Lettres, and Grand-Croix of the National Order of Merit. She received an Honorary Molière Award in 2003 for her entire career.

== Death ==
Casadesus died in Paris, France, at the age of 103.

== Theatre ==
=== At Comédie-Française ===
- 1934: Lorenzaccio by Alfred de Musset, directed by Émile Fabre
- 1934: La Brebis by Edmond See, directed by Jean Debucourt
- 1934: On ne badine pas avec l'amour by Alfred de Musset
- 1934: Le Mariage forcé by Molière, directed by Robert Manuel
- 1934: Le Sourire du faune by André Rivoire, directed by Pierre Bertin
- 1934: Le Médecin malgré lui by Molière
- 1934: Ruy Blas by Victor Hugo
- 1934: La Belle aventure by Gaston Arman de Caillavet, Robert de Flers and Étienne Rey
- 1934: L'Amour veille by Gaston Arman de Caillavet and Robert de Flers
- 1934: Tante Marie by Anne Valray, directed by Charles Granval
- 1934: Le Barbier de Séville by Beaumarchais
- 1935: Le Mariage de Figaro by Beaumarchais
- 1935: L'Impromptu de Versailles by Molière
- 1935: Les Burgraves by Victor Hugo
- 1935: L'Étourdi ou les Contretemps by Molière
- 1935: L'Illustre théâtre by Jules Truffier; directed by Pierre Bertin
- 1935: Madame Quinze by Jean Sarment, directed by Émile Fabre
- 1935: Sur la lisière d'un bois by Victor Hugo
- 1935: Les Fourberies de Scapin by Molière
- 1935: L'Arlésienne by Alphonse Daudet
- 1935: Paraître by Maurice Donnay
- 1936: L'Embuscade by Henry Kistemaeckers
- 1936: Le Sang de Danton by Saint-Georges de Bouhélier; directed by Léon Bernard
- 1936: Les Noces d'argent by Paul Géraldy
- 1936: Le Chant du berceau by Gregorio and María Martínez Sierra; directed by Émile Fabre
- 1936: Le Voyage à Biarritz by Jean Sarment; directed by André Brunot
- 1936: Les Rivaux d'eux-mêmes by Pigault-Lebrun; directed by Jean Martinelli
- 1936: Un caprice by Alfred de Musset, directed by Maurice Escande
- 1936: La Nouvelle idole by François de Curel
- 1936: Bolivar by Jules Supervielle; music by Darius Milhaud, choreography by Serge Lifar, directed by Émile Fabre
- 1936: Le Bon Roi Dagobert by André Rivoire
- 1936: Martine by Jean-Jacques Bernard
- 1937: Asmodée by François Mauriac; directed by Jacques Copeau
- 1937: La Marche nuptiale by Henry Bataille
- 1937: Le Jeu de l'amour et du hasard by Marivaux; directed by Maurice Escande
- 1937: Le Monde où l'on s'ennuie by Édouard Pailleron
- 1937: L'Impromptu de Versailles by Molière, directed by Pierre Dux
- 1937: À quoi rêvent les jeunes filles by Alfred de Musset; directed by Charles Granval
- 1937: Les Corbeaux by Henry Becque
- 1937: Le Légataire universel by Jean-François Regnard, directed by Pierre Dux
- 1937: L'Illusion comique by Pierre Corneille, directed by Louis Jouvet
- 1937: Le Bonhomme jadis by Henri Murger
- 1937: Le Dépit amoureux by Molière
- 1938: La Seconde Surprise de l'amour by Marivaux, directed by Pierre Bertin
- 1938: Tricolore by Pierre Lestringuez, musique Darius Milhaud, directed by Louis Jouvet
- 1938: Cantique des cantiques by Jean Giraudoux; directed by Louis Jouvet
- 1938: Les Femmes savantes by Molière
- 1938: La Dispute by Marivaux; directed by Jean Martinelli
- 1938: Un chapeau de paille d'Italie by Eugène Labiche and Marc-Michel, directed by Gaston Baty
- 1938: Le Menteur by Pierre Corneille, directed by Pierre Bertin
- 1938: La Coupe enchantée by Jean de La Fontaine and Champmeslé, directed by André Bacqué
- 1938: Esther by Jean Racine; directed by Georges Le Roy
- 1939: A souffert sous Ponce Pilate by Paul Raynal; directed by René Alexandre
- 1939: Les Trois Henry by André Lang
- 1939: Les affaires sont les affaires by Octave Mirbeau
- 1939: Ruy Blas by Victor Hugo; directed by Pierre Dux
- 1939: La Belle Aventure by Gaston Arman de Caillavet, Robert de Flers and Étienne Rey
- 1940: L'Âne de Buridan by Gaston Arman de Caillavet and Robert de Flers; directed by Pierre Bertin
- 1940: Les Fausses Confidences by Marivaux; directed by Pierre Dux
- 1941: Les Précieuses ridicules by Molière; directed by André Brunot
- 1941: La Gageure imprévue by Michel-Jean Sedaine; directed by Pierre Bertin
- 1941: Noé by André Obey; directed by Pierre Bertin
- 1941: Le Beau Léandre by Théodore de Banville and Paul Siraudin, directed by Denis d'Inès
- 1941: Tartuffe ou l'Imposteur by Molière; directed by Pierre Bertin
- 1942: Le Cheval arabe by Julien Luchaire; directed by Jean Debucourt
- 1942: La Paix chez soi by Georges Courteline
- 1942: Le Distrait by Jean-François Regnard; directed by Jean Meyer
- 1942: Le Misanthrope by Molière; directed by Jacques Copeau
- 1942: La Gageure imprévue by Michel-Jean Sedaine; directed by Pierre Bertin
- 1943: La Reine morte by Henry de Montherlant; directed by Pierre Dux
- 1943: Un jour by Francis Jammes
- 1943: Le Barbier de Séville by Beaumarchais, directed by Pierre Dux
- 1943: Le Sicilien ou l'Amour peintre by Molière; directed by Maurice Escande
- 1944: Barberine by Alfred de Musset, directed by Jean Meyer
- 1945: Une visite de noces by Alexandre Dumas fils
- 1945: L'Avare by Molière; directed by Jean Meyer
- 1946: Le Mariage de Figaro by Beaumarchais; directed by Jean Meyer
- 1946: La Princesse d'Élide by Molière; directed by Georges Le Roy
- 1946: Feu la mère de madame by Georges Feydeau; directed by Fernand Ledoux
- 1948: L'Ami Fritz by Émile Erckmann and Alexandre Chatrian
- 1948: L'Épreuve by Marivaux; directed by Julien Bertheau
- 1948: Le Gendre de M. Poirier by Émile Augier and Jules Sandeau
- 1949: On ne saurait penser à tout by Alfred de Musset; directed by Robert Manuel
- 1950: La Belle aventure by Gaston Arman de Caillavet, Robert de Flers and Étienne Rey; directed by Jean Debucourt
- 1950: Les Fausses Confidences by Marivaux; directed by Maurice Escande
- 1951: Sganarelle ou le Cocu imaginaire by Molière; directed by Jacques Clancy
- 1951: Le Chevalier Canepin by Henri Duvernois; directed by Jacques Charon
- 1951: Le Dindon by Georges Feydeau; directed by Jean Meyer
- 1951: L'Indigent by Charles Vildrac; directed by Georges Chamarat
- 1952: La Coupe enchantée by Jean de La Fontaine and Champmeslé; directed by Jacques Clancy
- 1952: Le Légataire universel by Jean-François Régnard; directed by Pierre Dux
- 1952: Les Précieuses ridicules by Molière; directed by Robert Manuel
- 1953: Le Menteur by Corneille; directed by Denis d'Inès
- 1953: Le Dépit amoureux by Molière; directed by Georges Chamarat
- 1953: Le Jeu de l'amour et du hasard by Marivaux; directed by Maurice Escande
- 1954: L'Épreuve by Marivaux; directed by Julien Bertheau
- 1954: Le Menteur by Pierre Corneille; directed by Denis d'Inès
- 1955: Est-il bon ? Est-il méchant? by Denis Diderot; directed by Henri Rollan
- 1957: La Bonne Mère by Florian; directed by Maurice Escande
- 1957: L'Ours by Anton Chekhov; directed by André Falcon
- 1958: Un ami de jeunesse by Edmond See, directed by Denis d'Inès
- 1958: La Maison de campagne by Florent Carton Dancourt, directed by Hélène Perdrière
- 1958: On ne saurait penser à tout by Alfred de Musset, directed by Robert Manuel
- 1958: Le Misanthrope by Molière, directed by Pierre Dux
- 1959: Les Trente Millions de Gladiator by Eugène Labiche; directed by Jean Meyer
- 1960: Chacun sa vérité by Luigi Pirandello; directed by Charles Dullin
- 1961: On ne saurait penser à tout by Alfred de Musset; directed by Robert Manuel
- 1962: La Troupe du Roy by Molière; directed by Paul-Émile Deiber
- 1980: La Folle de Chaillot by Jean Giraudoux; directed by Michel Fagadau
- 1990: Tête de poulet by Spiro, lecture
- 2011: Le Jubilé d'Agathe by Pascal Lainé, lecture, Studio-Théâtre de la Comédie-Française

=== Outside Comédie-Française ===
- Une petite qui voit grand by Germaine Acremant
- Boubouroche by Georges Courteline
- J'y suis j'y reste by Raymond Vincy and Jean Valmy
- Le Bal des voleurs by Jean Anouilh
- Le Rendez-vous de Senlis by Jean Anouilh
- Histoire de rire by Armand Salacrou
- Une femme libre by Armand Salacrou
- Monsieur chasse ! by Georges Feydeau
- Bonne chance Denis by Michel Duran
- Le Complexe de Philémon by Jean Bernard-Luc
- Caroline a disparu by Jean Valmy and André Haguet
- Les Œufs de l'autruche by André Roussin
- Teddy and partner by Yvan Noé
- Hyménée by Édouard Bourdet
- And Then There Were None by Agatha Christie
- La Voyante by André Roussin
- Le Chantier by Charles Tordjman
- 1965: Lorsque l'enfant paraît by André Roussin, directed by the author, théâtre des Célestins
- 1967: Lorsque l'enfant paraît by André Roussin, directed by the author, Théâtre Saint-Georges
- 1968: La Courte Paille by Jean Meyer, directed by the author, tournée
- 1969: Monsieur chasse ! by Georges Feydeau, directed by Alain Feydeau, Grand Théâtre de Limoges
- 1974: Ce formidable bordel ! by Eugène Ionesco, directed by Jacques Mauclair, théâtre des Célestins
- 1980: Fin de partie by Samuel Beckett, directed by Guy Rétoré, théâtre de l'Est parisien
- 1982: Fin de partie by Samuel Beckett, directed by Guy Rétoré, théâtre Renaud-Barrault
- 1987: Entre passions et prairie by Denise Bonal, directed by Guy Rétoré, théâtre de l'Est parisien
- 1988: Le Vallon by Agatha Christie, directed by Simone Benmussa, théâtre Renaud-Barrault
- 1989: Clair de terre by Daniel Besnehard, directed by Guy Rétoré, théâtre de l'Est parisien
- 1992: Le Jugement dernier by Bernard-Henri Lévy, directed by Jean-Louis Martinelli, théâtre de l'Atelier
- 1993: Le Retour en Touraine by Françoise Dorin, directed by Georges Wilson, théâtre de l'Œuvre
- 1995: Savannah Bay by Marguerite Duras, directed by Jean-Claude Amyl, théâtre national de Chaillot
- 1997: Le Bonheur à Romorantin by Jean-Claude Brisville, directed by Jean-Luc Tardieu, Espace 44 Nantes
- 1999: Savannah Bay by Marguerite Duras, directed by Jean-Claude Amyl, théâtre du Rond-Point
- 2003: À chacun sa vérité by Luigi Pirandello, directed by Bernard Murat, Centre national de création d'Orléans, théâtre Antoine
- 2005: Richard III by William Shakespeare, directed by Didier Long, La Coursive La Rochelle

== Filmography ==
=== Cinema ===
| Year | Film | Role | Notes |
|---|---|---|---|
| 1934 | The Adventurer | Geneviève | |
| 1934 | Un soir à la Comédie-Française | Herself | |
| 1943 | Graine au vent | Germaine | |
| 1943 | Vautrin | Clotilde de Grandlieu | |
| 1944 | Coup de tête | Nadine | |
| 1945 | Pamela | Joséphine de Beauharnais | |
| 1946 | The Eternal Husband | Marie | |
| 1947 | The Adventures of Casanova | Geneviève de Cerlin | |
| 1948 | Route sans issue | Simone Fournier | |
| 1949 | Between Eleven and Midnight | Florence | |
| 1949 | Du Guesclin | Jeanne, Countess of Penthièvre | |
| 1974 | Verdict | Nicole Leguen | |
| 1974 | Le Mouton enragé | Mme Lourceuil | |
| 1975 | Ma Mie Rose | Mamie Rose | |
| 1976 | Le Collectionneur de cerveaux | Mme Vanderwood | |
| 1976 | Un mari, c'est un mari | Senator | |
| 1976 | Une femme fidèle | Countess Lapalimmes | |
| 1977 | Un oursin dans la poche | Benjamin's mother | |
| 1984 | Opéra des ombres, Berlioz 1864 | | |
| 1988 | Sweet Lies | Nemo | |
| 1988 | Un été d'orages | Grandmother | |
| 1990 | Cinématon | Herself | Épisode 1342 |
| 1990 | Couple | Herself | Épisode 76 |
| 1993 | Roulez jeunesse! | Bernadette | |
| 1996 | Hommes, femmes, mode d'emploi | Clara Blanc | |
| 1996 | Album de famille | Geneviève | Short film |
| 1997 | Post coïtum animal triste | la dame du couple âgé amoureux | |
| 1998 | Riches, belles, etc. | Rosalinde | |
| 1999 | The Children of the Marshland | Mme Mercier | |
| 1999 | La Dilettante | The volunteer | |
| 2000 | Aïe | Robert's mother | |
| 2001 | Deux vieilles dames et l'accordeur | Old lady | Short film |
| 2001 | J'me souviens plus | Rose | Short film |
| 2002 | C'est le bouquet ! | The lady | |
| 2004 | Le Promeneur du Champs-de-Mars | Simone Picard's sister | |
| 2005 | Palais royal! | Alma, The Queen Mother | |
| 2005 | Le Noël de Lily | Lily | Short film |
| 2005 | Travaux, on sait quand ça commence... | | |
| 2006 | Le Grand Appartement | Grandmother Joséphine | |
| 2007 | Le Quatrième Morceau de la femme coupée en trois | The old lady | |
| 2009 | Le Premier Cercle | Mme Malakian | |
| 2009 | Kankant | Raymonde | Short film |
| 2009 | Le Hérisson | Mme de Broglie | |
| 2010 | Porteur d'hommes | Old lady | Short film |
| 2010 | My Afternoons with Margueritte | Margueritte | |
| 2010 | What War May Bring | Ilva, 95 years old | |
| 2010 | Sarah's Key | Mamé | |
| 2012 | Le Jeu de cette famille | Berthe | |
| 2013 | Sous le figuier | Selma | |
| 2014 | Weekends in Normandy | Françoise | |

=== Television ===
1966: fr:Les Compagnons de Jéhu (mini-série) (in French), directed by Michel Drach: Louise de Montrevel

2001: Maigret Chez Le Ministre, Maigret and the Minister (Sn7 Ep2) directed by Christian de Chalonge: Mme Calame

== Bibliography ==
- Casadesus, Gisèle (1960). Le jeune fille au théâtre de Corneille à Claudel.
- Casadesus, Gisèle (1961). Le jeune Molière: pour le tricentenaire de ses premiers succès parisiens, 1661–1961. Europe-Ed. français réunis.
- Casadesus, Gisèle; Dumesnil, Jacques (1968). Simone de Beauvoir: Extraits de: Mémoires d'une jeune fille rangée. La force de l'âge. L'Age de discrétion. Libr. Hachette.
- Casadesus, Gisèle (2007). Le jeu de l'amour et du théâtre. Philippe Rey. ISBN 9782848760865.
- Casadesus, Gisèle (2014). Cent ans, c'est passé si vite... Le Passeur Editeur. ISBN 9782368901212.
- Casadesus, Gisèle; Blondie, Isabelle (21 August 2014). Ici Paris d'hier à avant-hier. Chèvre-feuille étoilée. ISBN 9782367950815.

== See also ==
- Casadesus
- List of centenarians (actors, filmmakers and entertainers)
