= Willy Holt =

American production designer

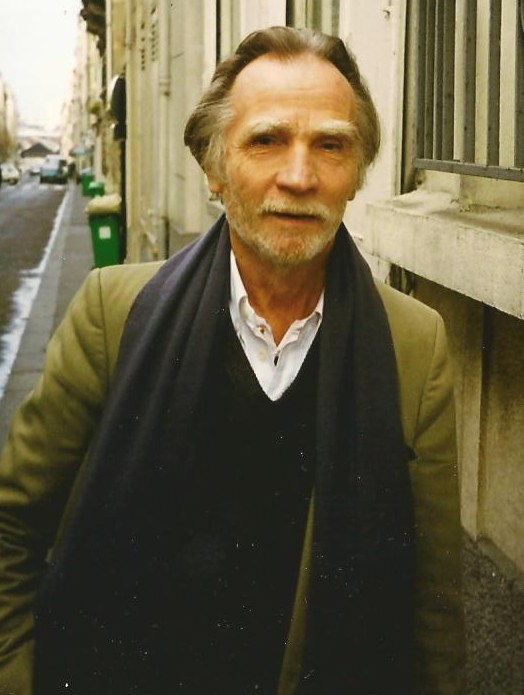
- Willy Holt in 1995
- Born: 30 November 1921; Quincy, Florida
- Died: 22 June 2007 (aged 85); Paris, France
- Occupations: Production designer Art director
- Years active: 1947–1999

Willy Holt (30 November 1921 – 22 June 2007) was a French and American production designer, art director and actor who lived in France for many years. He was nominated for an Academy Award in the category Best Art Direction for the film Is Paris Burning?, and won a César Award for Best Production Design for Au revoir les enfants.

== Personal life ==
Willy Holt was born in Quincy, Florida, in 1921, the son of an American military photographer and his French wife. After his parents divorced his mother returned with him to her home country, where he was naturalised as a French citizen in 1923. He graduated with a baccalauréat from the Lycée Fermat in Toulouse during the early years of the Occupation.

Holt was married for four years to the actress Micheline Bourday, subsequently marrying the actress Martine Pascal in 1958. He and Pascal had two children.

== War resistance ==
Holt was a member of the French Resistance and was arrested at Grenoble railway station in December 1943 while transferring money on behalf of anti-Nazi Resistance fighters. He was interned at Auschwitz, via the Drancy internment camp. He survived the death march from Auschwitz to Buchenwald, where he was liberated on 13 April 1945. Holt wrote about his wartime experiences in his 1995 book Femmes en deuil sur camion.

== Career ==
After briefly working as a fashion designer, Holt was hired to work in television in 1946. His set designs for several television shows led to further work in cinema, initially as an art director.

As befitted his Franco-American origins, Holt worked on several productions in both countries, collaborating with a number of internationally renowned film directors such as John Frankenheimer, Stanley Donen, Otto Preminger, Robert Parrish, Fred Zinnemann, Bertrand Blier, Woody Allen, Michael Ritchie, Louis Malle and Roman Polanski.

== Selected filmography ==
=== As production designer ===
Year	Title	Notes
1964	The Train	
1965	Up from the Beach	
1966	Is Paris Burning?	
1967	Two for the Road	art director
1968	The Sergeant	
1969	Staircase	art director
1970	The Lady in the Car with Glasses and a Gun	
1971	The Married Couple of the Year Two	as William Holt
1972	Le Viager	
1973	The Day of the Jackal	set designer
1974	Les Gaspards	
1974	The Marseille Contract	
1975	Rosebud	uncredited
1975	Love and Death	art director
1975	Le Gitan	
1976	Boomerang	
1976	The Porter from Maxim's	
1977	Man in a Hurry	
1977	Julia	
1979	An Almost Perfect Affair	art director
1979	La Gueule de l'autre	
1982	Santa Claus Is a Stinker	
1982	Five Days One Summer	
1983	Le Ruffian	
1983	Gramps Is in the Resistance	
1985	Target	
1987	Au revoir les enfants	
1990	Milou en mai	
1992	Bitter Moon	
1993	La Soif de l'or	
1996	Mon homme	

=== As actor ===
Year	Title	Role	Notes
1981	Pour la peau d'un flic	L'homme qui a tué Fanch Tanguy	
1983	Zelig	Rally Chancellor	
1998	Place Vendôme		
1999	The Ninth Gate	Andrew Telfer	
2015	La sonate des spectres		
