= A Hole in the Wall (1930 film) =

1930 film

- Directed by: René Barberis
- Written by: Gustave Quinson (play); Yves Mirande (play); René Barberis
- Starring: Jean Murat; Dolly Davis; Marguerite Moreno
- Production company: Paramount Pictures
- Distributed by: Paramount Pictures
- Release date: 6 June 1930
- Running time: 83 minutes
- Country: France
- Language: French

A Hole in the Wall (French: Un trou dans le mur) is a 1930 French comedy film directed by René Barberis and starring Jean Murat, Dolly Davis and Marguerite Moreno. It was made at the Joinville Studios near Paris by the French subsidiary of the American company Paramount Pictures. Separate Spanish and Swedish-language versions were made, the Spanish known as A Lucky Man and directed by Benito Perojo.

It was based on a play by Yves Mirande which was remade as a 1950 film of the same title.

== Cast ==
- Jean Murat as André de Kerdrec
- Dolly Davis as Lucie
- Marguerite Moreno as Arthémise
- Léon Belières as Le comte de Corbin
- Pierre Brasseu as Anatole
- Suzanne Dehelly as La couturière
- Lucien Callamand as Le jardinier
- Charles Lamy as L'antiquaire
- Fanny Clair

== Bibliography ==
- Bentley, Bernard. A Companion to Spanish Cinema. Boydell & Brewer 2008.
