= Adélaïde Concerto =

Violin concerto misattributed to W. A. Mozart

The Adélaïde Concerto is the nickname of a violin concerto in D major attributed to Wolfgang Amadeus Mozart and given the catalogue number K. Anh. 294a in the third edition of the standard Köchel catalogue of Mozart's works. (Note: "Anh." denotes "Anhang" or "appendix" to the catalogue.) Unknown until the 20th century, this concerto was later discovered to be a spurious work by Marius Casadesus. It was given a new number in the sixth edition of the Köchel catalogue, K. Anh.C 14.05, as part of the Anhang C designated for spurious or doubtful works which have been attributed to Mozart at some time.

== Background ==
First published in 1933 in a version for violin and piano, the concerto was said by Casadesus, the "editor", to have been arranged from a manuscript by the ten-year-old Mozart, with a title page containing a dedication to Madame Adélaïde, the fourth daughter of King Louis XV. Conveniently enough, this alleged manuscript was never accessible to later researchers such as Alfred Einstein and Friedrich Blume, but Casadesus described it, according to Blume, as "an autograph manuscript in two staves, of which the upper stave carries the solo part (Note: including 'tuttis'...) and the lower carries the bass." In what was surely a nose-tweak at those fooled by this imposture, Casadesus also reported that "The upper stave is notated in D, the lower in E". Since the violin is not a transposing instrument, there would have been no obvious technical reason for the upper staff to be written in a different key from the lower staff, especially for what sounds more like a short score than a completed score.

Despite the lack of provenance, Blume was thoroughly taken in by the concerto, although Einstein professed himself skeptical. The latter referred to it as "a piece of mystification a la Kreisler". (Fritz Kreisler, the famed violinist, had written several pieces in the styles of composers such as Gaetano Pugnani, Giuseppe Tartini, and Antonio Vivaldi which he had originally passed off as compositions by these older masters.)

Many others expressed similar doubts, but only in 1977 during a copyright dispute did Casadesus admit his authorship of this alleged "Mozart" work.

The "Adélaïde Concerto" is sometimes erroneously credited to Marius' brother Henri Casadesus, perhaps because of many other spurious musical pieces he and other members of the Casadesus family composed in the names of Johann Christian Bach, George Frideric Handel, and other composers.

== Structure ==
The concerto has three movements:

1. Allegro
2. Adagio
3. Allegro
