= To Live Happily =

1932 film

- Directed by: Claudio de la Torre
- Written by: Abel Tarride
- Based on: To Live Happily by Yves Mirande and André Rivoire
- Starring: Noël-Noël; Suzet Maïs; Pierre Etchepare
- Cinematography: Theodore J. Pahle
- Production company: Les Studios Paramount
- Distributed by: Les Films Paramount
- Release date: 16 December 1932
- Running time: 80 minutes
- Country: France
- Language: French

To Live Happily (French: Pour vivre heureux) is a 1932 French comedy film directed by Claudio de la Torre and starring Noël-Noël, Suzet Maïs and Pierre Etchepare. It was based on a play of the same title by Yves Mirande and André Rivoire. It was produced by the French subsidiary of Paramount Pictures at the company's Joinville Studios in Paris.

== Synopsis ==
After he is mistakenly believed to be dead, a previously struggling artist suddenly enjoys enormous success.

== Cast ==
- Noël-Noël as Jean Mauclair
- Suzet Maïs as Madeleine
- Pierre Etchepare as Maurice Pradoux
- Yvonne Hébert as Noémie
- Simone Simon as Jacqueline
- Jean Sinoël as Chimène
- Christian Argentin as Ruffat
- Lucien Brulé as Girardot

== Bibliography ==
- Bessy, Maurice & Chirat, Raymond. Histoire du cinéma français: 1929-1934. Pygmalion, 1988.
- Crisp, Colin. Genre, Myth and Convention in the French Cinema, 1929-1939. Indiana University Press, 2002.
- Goble, Alan. The Complete Index to Literary Sources in Film. Walter de Gruyter, 1999.
- Rège, Philippe. Encyclopedia of French Film Directors, Volume 1. Scarecrow Press, 2009.
