= Henri Casadesus =

French musician (1879–1947)

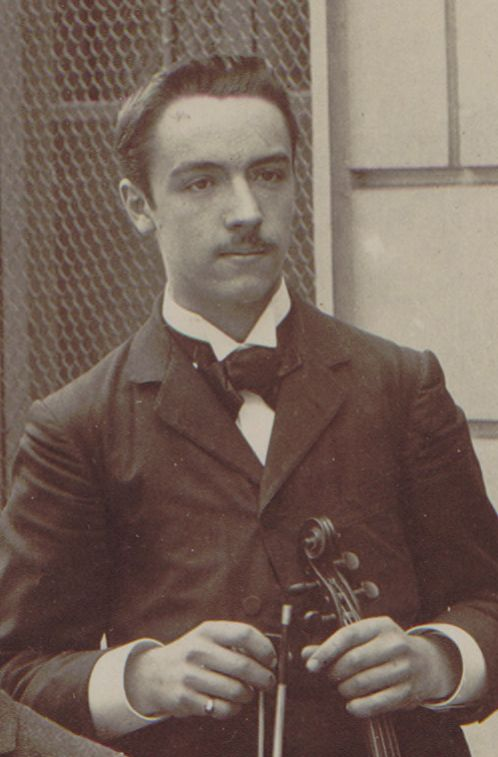
- Casadesus in 1895

Background information
- Born: Henri-Gustave Casadesus; 30 September 1879; Paris, France
- Died: 31 May 1947 (aged 67) Paris, France
- Education: Conservatoire de Paris
- Occupations: Violist, viola d'amore player, composer, editor

Henri-Gustave Casadesus (30 September 1879 – 31 May 1947) was a violist, viola d'amore player, composer, and music publisher.

== Early life ==
Born in the 9th arrondissement of Paris, Casadesus received his early musical instruction with Albert Lavignac and studied viola with Théophile Laforge at the Conservatoire de Paris, taking first prize in 1899. From 1910 to 1917, he was the violist of the Capet Quartet.

== Career ==
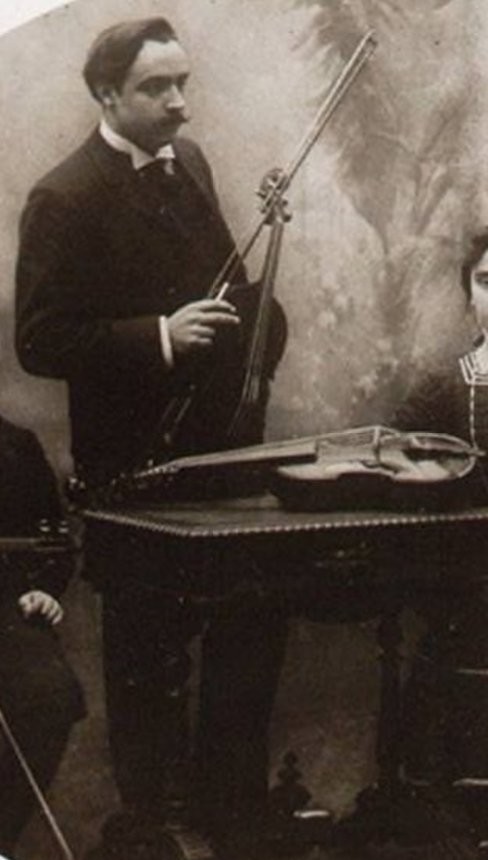
Casadesus with viola and viola d'amore, ca. 1900

Along with Camille Saint-Saëns, Casadesus founded the "Société des instruments anciens" in 1901. The society, which operated between 1901 and 1939, was a quintet of performers who used rediscovered early music instruments such as the viola da gamba, or Casadesus's own instrument, the viola d'amore.

The quintet was also notable in its day for premiering rediscovered works by long-dead composers. It was later discovered that Casadesus and his brothers, notably Marius Casadesus, wrote these works. The Adélaïde Concerto, allegedly by Wolfgang Amadeus Mozart, is sometimes mistakenly attributed to Henri but is actually by Marius.

Henri Casadesus is believed to have been the author of a "Concerto in D major for viola" ascribed to Carl Philipp Emanuel Bach, described by Rachel W. Wade in her survey The Keyboard Concertos of Carl Philipp Emanuel Bach. This concerto appeared in 1911 in a Russian edition, allegedly "transcribed...for small orchestra by Maximilian Steinberg", and was subsequently performed by conductors such as Darius Milhaud and Serge Koussevitzky, then recorded by both Felix Prohaska and Eugene Ormandy, all under the false attribution. "Thus", Wade wrote in 1981, "at the present time, the most frequently recorded concerto of C. P. E. Bach is a spurious one."

Casadesus is also credited with the "Handel Concerto" and the "J. C. Bach Concerto", which are both for viola as well. These are often referred to as "The Handel/Casadesus Concerto" and "The J.C. Bach/Casadesus Concerto". Scholarly criticism has confirmed that both these concerti were written by Henri Casadesus in the style of their purported composers. Casadesus is also the composer of a violin concerto in D major in the style of Boccherini.

Casadesus died in 1947 in the 7th arrondissement of Paris, aged 67.

== Family ==
He was the brother of Marius Casadesus and Robert-Guillaume Casadesus, uncle of the famous pianist Robert Casadesus, and granduncle of Jean Casadesus. Henri Casadesus had five children including actor Christian Casadesus and actress Gisèle Casadesus. He was grandfather to Jean-Claude Casadesus and Dominique Probst.

== Selected works ==
=== Stage ===
- Le rosier, opera buffa in 3 acts (1914); libretto by Maurice Devilliers
- Les plaisirs champêtres, ou, Les tentations de las bergère et l'amour vainqueur, ballet in 1 act (1924); music derived from Plaisirs champêtres and Divertissement by Michel Pignolet de Montéclair
- Cotillon III, opera buffa in 3 acts (1927); libretto by Gabriel Alphaud and Pierre Maudru
- Sans tambour ni trompette, operetta in 3 acts, 4 scenes (1931); libretto by Pierre Veber and Henry de Gorsse
- Valses de France, Fantasie musicale et grand spectacle "Sur des airs célèbres de Gounod, G. Bizet, B. Godard, L. Delibes, Hervé, O. Métra, Lacome, P. Delmet" in 2 acts, 18 scenes (1943); libretto by Eddy Ghilain and Albert Willemetz
- La petite-fille de madame Angot, operetta

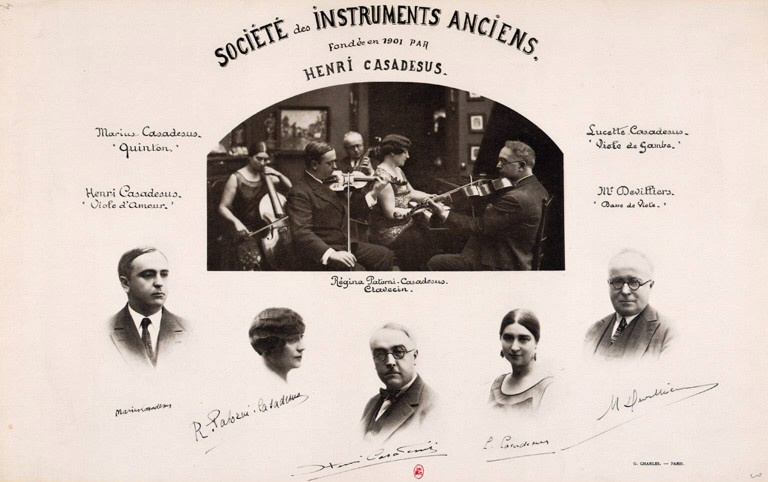
Société des Instruments Anciens fondée en 1901 par Henri Casadesus. Postcard showing Henri Casadesus and his ensemble: Marius, Lucette, & Régine Casadesus, and M. Devilliers. Bibliothèque nationale de France.

=== Orchestral ===
- Concerto in D major for small orchestra (ca.1905, published 1912); original "for four viols concertante"; falsely attributed to Carl Philipp Emanuel Bach
- Divertissement bressan, Suite for orchestra (published 1943)
- Divertissement Provençal, Suite for orchestra (published 1943)
1. Cortège et danse des treilles
2. L'Erbeto di frisoun
3. Le pas du cap de juven
4. Tambourin

=== Concertante ===
- Concerto (Suite) in D major for violin or viola and piano or orchestra (ca. 1905, published 1931); original "for four viols concertante"; falsely attributed to Carl Philipp Emanuel Bach
- "Handel" Concerto in B minor for viola and orchestra (published 1924); falsely attributed to George Frideric Handel
- "J. C. Bach" Concerto in C minor for viola and orchestra (published 1947); falsely attributed to Johann Christian Bach

=== Chamber music ===
- Aria de la Suite en sol, for cello and piano (or organ) (1911)
- Suite for string quartet (or string orchestra) (published 1931); falsely attributed to Carl Philipp Emanuel Bach
- La ronde des saisons for woodwind quintet (published 1987)
- 24 preludes for viola d'amore with accompaniment of harpsichord, piano, or harp (1931)

=== Pedagogical works ===
- Technique de la viole d'amour (Technique of the viola d'amore) (1931)

=== Piano ===
- Pieces from Cotillon-jazz (1927)
  - C'est moi, One-step
  - Jeux innocents, Fox-trot
  - Loulou, Fox-trot
  - Radix, One-step
- Marche ternaire (1935)
- Le jardin des amours (1939)
  - Pavane
  - Passepied
  - Menuet tendre
  - Canarie
- Les Récréations de la campagne (1947)

=== Vocal ===
- Quatre chansons cambodgiennes (4 Cambodian Songs) for voice and piano (1931); French words by Fernand Rouvray
- Quatre chansons françaises (4 French Songs) for voice and piano (1933); words by Léon Guillot de Saix
- Normandie for voice and piano (1935); words by René Dorin

=== Film scores ===
- Barranco, Ltd (1932)
- Colomba (1933)
- Le crime du chemin rouge (1933)
- Le gardian
- Paris New-York (1940)
- Matin de France (1942)
- Les mystères de Paris (Mysteries of Paris) (1943)
