= The Porter from Maxim's (1933 film) =

Le Chasseur de Chez Maxim's
- French film poster
- French: Le chasseur de chez Maxim's
- Directed by: Karl Anton
- Written by: Paul Schiller; Yves Mirande (play); Gustave Quinson (play)
- Starring: Tramel; Suzy Vernon; Robert Burnier
- Cinematography: Harry Stradling
- Music by: Casimir Oberfeld; René Sylviano
- Production company: Les Studios Paramount
- Distributed by: Les Films Paramount
- Release date: 2 March 1933
- Running time: 65 minutes
- Country: France
- Language: French

The Porter from Maxim's (French: Le chasseur de chez Maxim's) is a 1933 American comedy film in the French language, made at the Joinville Studios and produced by Les Films Paramount, the French branch of Paramount Pictures. It was directed by Karl Anton and starred Tramel, Suzy Vernon and Robert Burnier. It is one of several film adaptations of the 1923 French play of the same title. Although released in the US in 1935, it had neither dubbing nor English subtitles.

== Cast ==
- Tramel as Julien
- Suzy Vernon as Geneviève Pauphilat
- Robert Burnier as Le marquis du Vélin
- Mireille Perrey as Totoche
- Charles Siblot as La Chanoine
- Marguerite Moreno as Mme. Pauphitat
- Dany Lorys as Cricri
- Pierre Moreno as La Giclais
- Pierre Stéphen as Octave
- Georges Cahuzac as Cruchot
- Ritou Lancyle
- Denise Dorian
- Madeleine Lebergy
- Yves Mirande
