= Riches, belles, etc. =

- Directed by: Bunny Schpoliansky
- Written by: Bunny Schpoliansky
- Starring: Lola Naymark; Claudia Cardinale
- Cinematography: Christophe Beaucarne
- Edited by: Charlotte Fauvel
- Music by: Dominique Probst
- Release date: 1998
- Language: French

Riches, belles, etc. (also known as Riches, belles et cruelles) is a 1998 French comedy film written and directed by Bunny Schpoliansky and starring Lola Naymark, Claudia Cardinale and Marisa Berenson.

== Plot ==
During her rich and famous mother's absence, a little girl, alone in a big hotel, tries to understand what being a woman means by interviewing various women...

== Cast ==
- Lola Naymark as Rose
- Claudia Cardinale as Baroness Mitsy
- Marisa Berenson as Alizéa
- Anouk Aimée as la fée
- Sonia Rykiel as Hortense
- Gisèle Casadesus as Rosalinde
- Claire Maurier as The tawny woman
- Emilie Brigand as Laëtitia
- Jay Alexander as Jay
- Hermine de Clermont-Tonnerre as Alma
- Tasha Mota e Cunha as Ines
- Alexandra Kamp as la dormeuse
- Bunny Schpoliansky as Lilas
- Maria Cristina Mastrangeli as la gouvernante
- Firmine Richard as l'embaumeuse
- Isabelle Tanakil as l'Espagnole
- Urbain Cancelier
