= Evening Clothes =

1927 film by Luther Reed

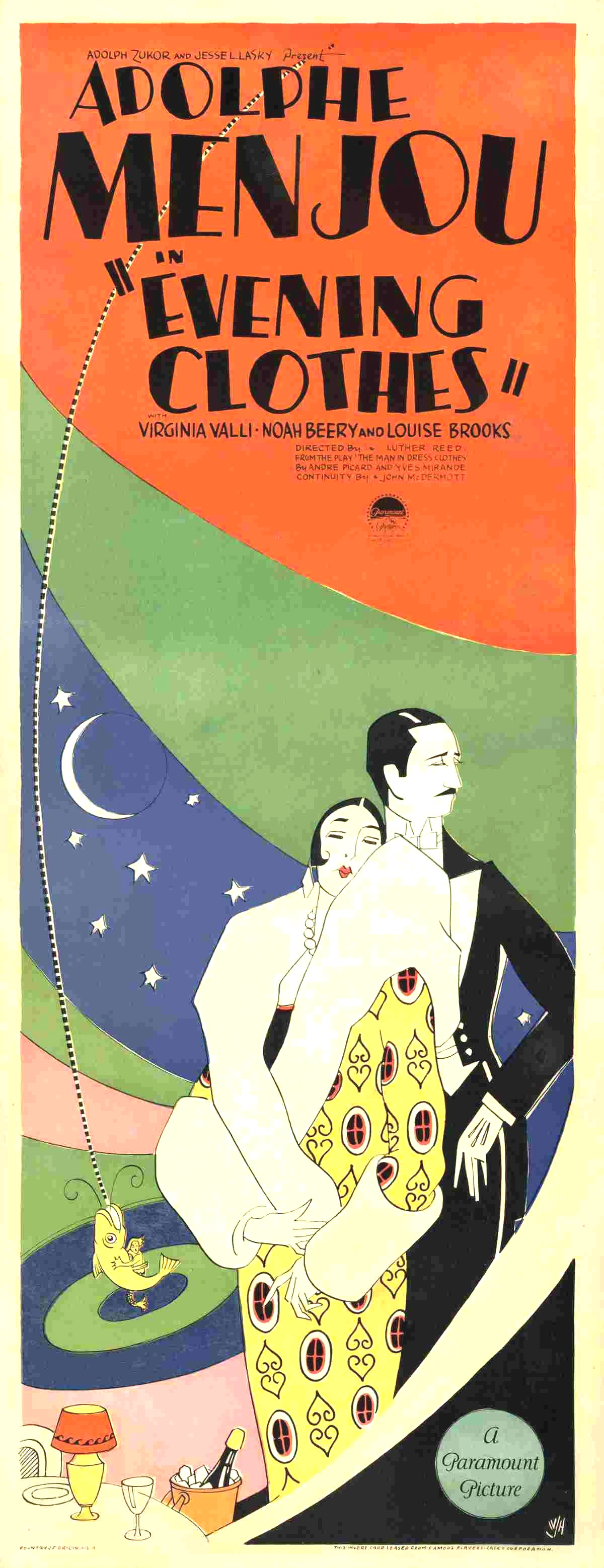
- Film poster
- Directed by: Luther Reed
- Written by: John McDermott (scenario); George Marion, Jr. (intertitles)
- Based on: The Man in Evening Clothes by Andre Picard and Yves Mirande
- Produced by: Adolph Zukor; Jesse L. Lasky; B. P. Schulberg (associate producer)
- Starring: Adolphe Menjou
- Cinematography: Harold Rosson
- Edited by: Eda Warren
- Distributed by: Paramount Pictures
- Release date: March 19, 1927
- Running time: 7 reels (6,287 feet)
- Country: United States
- Language: Silent (English intertitles)

Evening Clothes is a 1927 American silent comedy film directed by Luther Reed that was produced by Famous Players–Lasky and released by Paramount.

== Cast ==
- Adolphe Menjou as Lucien D'Artois
- Virginia Valli as Germaine
- Noah Beery as Lazarre
- Louise Brooks as Fox Trot
- Arnold Kent as Henri (credited as Lido Manetti)
- André Cheron as Germaine's father
- Marcia Harris as Miss Streeter
- Mario Carillo
- Lilyan Tashman

== Production background ==
The film is based on the 1920 play L'homme en habit (The Man in Evening Clothes) by Andre Picard and Yves Mirande. Directed by Luther Reed, the film starred Adolphe Menjou, Virginia Valli, and Louise Brooks and is currently considered a lost film.

Production took place January 3 through 29, 1927. The film was shot at Paramount’s studio in Hollywood, and at the Graf Brothers Studio in San Mateo, California and Kohl Estate in nearby Burlingame, California. Pre-release Paramount production records list the length at 7 reels (6,252 feet) for the domestic release, and 7 reels (6,204 feet) for the foreign release.

As part of Paramount's production of multiple-language versions of its films, two remakes were made in 1931 at the Joinville Studios in Paris, the Spanish-language film A Gentleman in Tails and the French-language film The Man in Evening Clothes.
