= The Wonderful Day (1980 film) =

- Directed by: Claude Vital
- Written by: Yves Mirande (play); Gustave Quinson (play); Georges Lerec (play)
- Produced by: Alain Poiré
- Starring: Michel Galabru; Daniel Ceccaldi; Stéphane Hillel
- Cinematography: Wladimir Ivanov
- Edited by: Catherine Kelber
- Music by: Claude Bolling
- Production companies: Production Marcel Dassault; Gaumont
- Distributed by: Gaumont Distribution
- Release date: 12 November 1980
- Running time: 95 minutes
- Country: France
- Language: French

The Wonderful Day (French: Une merveilleuse journée) is a 1980 French comedy film directed by Claude Vital and starring Michel Galabru, Daniel Ceccaldi and Stéphane Hillel.

== Cast ==
- Michel Galabru as Pinède
- Daniel Ceccaldi as Felloux
- Stéphane Hillel as Blaise
- Bernadette Lafont as La pharmacienne
- Paul Préboist as Le docteur
- Dorothée Jemma as Gladys
- Lyne Chardonnet as Geneviève
- Pierre Mirat as Le bijoutier
- Anémone as Deocadie
- Béatrice Avoine as Anna
- Anne Serard as Cri-Cri
- Rachel Cathoud as Totoche
- Philippe Castelli as Le constipé
- André Gille as Désiré
- Jacques Balutin as Le galeux
- Patrick Préjean as Octave
- Jean-Claude Islert as L'ami de la jeune fille enceinte
- Véronique Delbourg as La jeune fille enceinte
- Pierre Gallon as Le croupier
- Robert Dalban as L'homme à la Rolls
- Jacques Préboist as Le facteur
- Jean Luisi as Le commissaire des jeux

== Bibliography ==
- James Monaco. The Encyclopedia of Film. Perigee Books, 1991.
