= Luck (1931 film) =

1931 film

- Directed by: René Guissart
- Written by: Yves Mirande (play)
- Starring: Marie Bell; Marcel André; Françoise Rosay
- Production company: Les Studios Paramount
- Distributed by: Les Studios Paramount
- Release date: 24 December 1931
- Running time: 75 minutes
- Country: France
- Language: French

Luck (French: La chance) is a 1931 French drama film directed by René Guissart and starring Marie Bell, Marcel André and Françoise Rosay. It is based on a play by Yves Mirande about a woman who loses her fortune gambling at baccarat.

It was made by the French subsidiary of Paramount Pictures at the Joinville Studios in Paris.

== Cast ==
- Marie Bell as Tania Balieff
- Marcel André as Le docteur Gaston
- Françoise Rosay as Mme. Mougeot
- Pierre de Guingand as Curral
- Fernand Fabre as Le docteur Victor
- Jeanne Fusier-Gir as La concierge
- Madeleine Guitty as La cuisinière
- Palau as Le bijoutier
- Christian Argentin as Le propriétaire
- Robert Casa as Un chef de réception
- Léonce Corne as L'huissier
- Charlotte Martens
- Christiane Delyne
- Magdeleine Bérubet
- Maurice Escande

== Bibliography ==
- Dayna Oscherwitz & MaryEllen Higgins. The A to Z of French Cinema. Scarecrow Press, 2009.
