= The Eternal Husband (film) =

1946 film

- Directed by: Pierre Billon
- Written by: Charles Spaak; Pierre Brive; Jean Loubignac
- Based on: The Eternal Husband by Fyodor Dostoevsky
- Produced by: Paul-Edmond Decharme
- Starring: Raimu; Aimé Clariond; Gisèle Casadesus
- Cinematography: Nikolai Toporkoff
- Edited by: Germaine Artus
- Music by: Maurice Thiriet
- Production companies: Alcina; Les Films Vog
- Distributed by: Gaumont–Eagle Lion
- Release date: 19 June 1946
- Running time: 90 minutes
- Country: France
- Language: French

The Eternal Husband (French: L'homme au chapeau rond) is a 1946 French drama film directed by Pierre Billon and starring Raimu, Aimé Clariond and Gisèle Casadesus. It is an adaptation of the 1870 novel The Eternal Husband by Fyodor Dostoevsky. The film's sets were designed by the art director Georges Wakhévitch.

== Cast ==
- Raimu as Nicolas Trousotsky
- Aimé Clariond as Michel Veltchaninov
- Gisèle Casadesus as Marie
- Micheline Boudet as Agathe Zakhlebinina
- Louis Seigner as La juge Ernest Zakhlebinine
- Jane Marken as Amélie Zakhlebinine
- Made Siamé as La gouvernante de Marie
- Lucy Valnor as La petite Lisa
- Charles Lemontier as Le médecin
- Gisèle Alcée as Lucie Zakhlebinina
- Adrienne Alain as Anna Zakhlebinina
- Françoise De La Halle as Mathide Zakhlebinina
- Colette Georges as Adélaïde Zakhlebinina
- Maud Lamy as Élisabeth Zakhlebinina
- Thérèse Marney as Clotilde Zakhlebinina
- Janine Villard as Lily Zakhlebinina
- Héléna Manson as La mère de Mathias le hussard
- Arlette Merry as Madame Maria - la prostituée
- Jean-Pierre Mocky as Un garçon d'honneur

== Bibliography ==
- Goble, Alan. The Complete Index to Literary Sources in Film. Walter de Gruyter, 1999.
- Oscherwitz, Dayna & Higgins, MaryEllen. The A to Z of French Cinema. Scarecrow Press, 2009.
- Robinson, Douglas. Aleksis Kivi and/as World Literature. BRILL, 2017.
