= Rachel Cathoud =

Swiss actress (1946–2021)

- Born: 15 March 1946; Geneva, Switzerland
- Died: 27 February 2021 (aged 74); Geneva, Switzerland
- Occupation: Actress

Rachel Cathoud (15 March 1946 – 27 February 2021) was a Swiss actress.

== Biography ==
Cathoud grew up in a family of writers. Her father was of German-speaking Swiss origin and she would help translate texts in French to him. After taking courses at the Conservatoire de musique de Genève at a young age, she attend classes taught by the likes of François Simon, founder of the Théâtre de Carouge. At the age of 16, she landed the role of Agnès in the Molière play The School for Wives at the Nouveau Théâtre de Poche de Genève. She then became a troupe member at the Comédie de Genève.

In 1966, Cathoud moved to Paris and studied at the National Academy of Dramatic Arts. She lived in France for 17 years and held numerous roles in film, television, and theatre. Notably, she toured alongside Michel Deville, Claude Vital, and Gérard Oury. She returned to Switzerland in 1980 and continued to play various theatrical roles, including Roxane in Cyrano de Bergerac. She played her final role on 15 March 2015, in a production of Jusqu'à ce que la mort nous sépare.

Rachel Cathoud died from COVID-19 in Geneva on 27 February 2021, during the COVID-19 pandemic in Switzerland. She was 74 years old.

== Filmography ==
=== Cinema ===
- Morgane ou Le prétendant (1965)
- Les Mensonges (1971)
- Les Joyeux Lurons (1972)
- Love at the Top (1974)
- The Porter from Maxim's (1976)
- The Seventh Company Outdoors (1977)
- The Wonderful Day (1980)
- The Umbrella Coup (1980)

=== Television ===
- La Fin de la nuit (1966)
- Signé Picpus (1968)
- Poker d'As (1973)
- Les Gens de Mogador (1973)
