= Martine Pascal =

French actress (born 1939)

- Born: 27 January 1939 (age 87); Paris, France
- Occupation: Actress

Martine Pascal (born 27 January 1939) is a French theatre, cinema, and television actress. She is the daughter of actress Gisèle Casadesus (1914–2017) and actor Lucien Pascal (1906–2006). Pascal was married to American-born French production designer and art director Willy Holt with whom she has two children Natalie Holt and Oliver Holt.

== See also ==
- Casadesus
