= The Porter from Maxim's (1976 film) =

- Directed by: Claude Vital
- Written by: Jean Halain; Yves Mirande (play); Gustave Quinson (play); Claude Vital
- Produced by: Alain Poiré
- Starring: Michel Galabru; Jean Lefebvre; Marie-Hélène Breillat
- Cinematography: Maurice Fellous
- Edited by: Noëlle Boisson
- Music by: Paul Misraki
- Distributed by: Gaumont Distribution
- Release date: 15 December 1976
- Running time: 90 minutes
- Country: France
- Language: French

The Porter from Maxim's (French: Le chasseur de chez Maxim's) is a 1976 French comedy film directed by Claude Vital and starring Michel Galabru, Jean Lefebvre and Marie-Hélène Breillat. It is based on the 1923 play of the same name which has been made into several film adaptations.

== Cast ==
- Michel Galabru as Julien
- Jean Lefebvre as Le chanoine
- Marie-Hélène Breillat as Totoche
- Daniel Ceccaldi as Du Velin
- Francis Perrin as Octave
- Alfred Adam as Le patron de chez Maxim's
- Claude Gensac as Germaine
- Sabine Azéma as Geneviève
- Jean-Pierre Darras as Le ministre
- Dominique Davray as La tante
- Robert Dalban as Honoré
- Gabriel Jabbour as L'ambassadeur
- Jean Luisi as Firmin
- Anna Gaël as Lulu
- Gérard Jugnot as Le comte parieur
- Michel Bardinet as Binval
- Rachel Cathoud as Cri-Cri
- Nicole Desailly as Lucette
- Gérald Hemery as Le baron
- Lucien Frégis as Le porteur de chez Maxim's
- Pierre Gallon as Le second maître d'hôtel
- Gérard Hernandez as Hernandez
- Bernard Musson as Le premier ordonnateur
- Jackie Sardou as Marguerite

== Bibliography ==
- Rearick, Charles. Paris Dreams, Paris Memories: The City and Its Mystique. Stanford University Press, 2011.
