= Marguerite de la nuit =

- Directed by: Claude Autant-Lara
- Written by: Ghislaine Autant-Lara; Gabriel Arout
- Produced by: Cino Del Duca
- Starring: Michèle Morgan; Yves Montand
- Cinematography: Jacques Natteau
- Edited by: Madeleine Gug
- Music by: René Cloërec
- Production companies: Cino del Duca; Del Duca Films; Société Nouvelle des Établissements Gaumont (SNEG)
- Distributed by: Société des Etablissements L. Gaumont
- Release date: 18 January 1955
- Running time: 125 min
- Countries: Italy; France
- Language: French

Marguerite de la nuit (US title: Marguerite of the Night) is a 1955 French language motion picture fantasy drama directed by Claude Autant-Lara, and written by Ghislaine Autant-Lara (screenplay & dialogue) and Gabriel Arout (adaptation), based on novel by Pierre Dumarchais. The film stars Michèle Morgan and Yves Montand.

It tells the story of an older pedant who buys adolescence from Satan.

== Cast ==
- Michèle Morgan as Marguerite
- Yves Montand as M. Léon
- Massimo Girotti as Valentin
- Jean Debucourt as L'homme austère
- Jacques Clancy as Angelo
- Paul Demange as Ua client du 'Pigall's'
- Jacques Erwin as the ténor
- Camille Guérini
- Suzet Maïs as a client at the 'Pigall's'
- Max Mégy
- Geneviève Morel as La concierge
- Fernand Sardou as Le patron du café
- Hélène Tossy as La patronne du café
- Louis Seigner as L'homme de l'hôtel
- Jean-François Calvé as Georges Faust
- Palau as Dr. Faust
