= Béatrice Casadesus =

French painter and sculptor

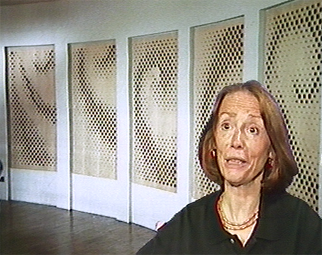
- Born: 1 January 1942 (age 84); Paris, France
- Other names: Béatrice Probst
- Occupations: Painter, sculptor

Béatrice Casadesus (born 1 January 1942) is a French painter and sculptor, and professor at the École nationale supérieure des Beaux-Arts in Paris, France.

== Biography ==
Born Béatrice Probst to actress Gisèle Casadesus and actor Lucien Pascal (born Lucien Probst), Casadesus followed courses with Edmée Larnaudie at the École des Arts Appliqués from 1956 to 1959. From 1960 to 1966, she studied painting and sculpture with Henri-Georges Adam at the École des Beaux-Arts de Paris, and participated in the Roman theater group of the Sorbonne alongside Jean-Pierre Miquel, François Joxe, and Jacques Lacarrière. In 1964, she received the Prix de Rome for sculptors, and stayed in Italy, and with a grant from Fondation Marcel-Bleustein-Blanchet pour la vocation, she began a collaboration with architects, including Antoine Stinco.

From 1975 to 1977, Casadesus travelled to Malaysia, Burma, Thailand, and Indonesia and started Brûlages et Dessins d'ombre (until 1995). After the discovery of Georges Seurat, she abandoned sculpture for painting, and developed from 1980 and until 1989 the Tramaturgies inspired by Leonardo da Vinci, Michelangelo, and School of Fontainebleau. From 1984 to 1990, she began the series Blancs volants and titled after words of the poet Shitao. From 1990 to 2000 she worked on fingerprints and explored the theme of the materiality of the paint on different paper substrates such as washi, tarlatan, and non-woven textiles.

From 1992 to 1994, she directed the art workshop at the École nationale supérieure des Beaux-Arts in Paris and was appointed professor of the Art and Architecture Schools. From 1997 to 2001, she produced Les Mues, a series of wrinkled paintings, and Peintures sans fin, large rolls of paintings presented randomly in space.

== Recent personal exhibitions ==
- 1994
  - Orients, Dungeon Museum, Niort; galerie Landon, New York
  - Publication of Lux by Voix editions; exposition à cette occasion à la galerie Mohanjeet à Paris
  - Hostages, Ambassade de France à New York, Services culturels
- 1995
  - Orients, galerie Muséum Annex, Hong Kong
  - Variations Or, galerie Romagny, Paris
- 2002
  - The Gaze and the Trace, exposition rétrospective (1975-2001), Maison des Arts de Malakoff, Musée de l'Arsenal de Soissons; Institut Français de Barcelone, Espagne
- 2011
  - Moults at musée de Cahors Henri-Martin

== See also ==
- Casadesus
