= Pierre Etchepare =

French actor

- Born: 2 October 1891; Paris, France
- Died: 20 April 1943 (aged 51); Neuilly-sur-Seine, France
- Occupation: Actor

Pierre Paul Lucien Salvat Etchepare (2 October 1891 – 20 April 1943) was a French actor.

Pierre Etchepare was born in Paris and died in Neuilly-sur-Seine, Hauts-de-Seine.

== Selected filmography ==
- Happy Couple (1923)
- My Aunt from Honfleur (1923)
- Let's Get Married (1931)
- The Man in Evening Clothes (1931)
- To Live Happily (1932)
- You Will Be a Duchess (1932)
- Mademoiselle Josette, My Woman (1933)
- Paprika (1933)
- Simone Is Like That (1933)
- Count Obligado (1935)
- The Lover of Madame Vidal (1936)
- The Three Shots (1936)
- La Garçonne (1936)
- Lady Killer (1937)
- Men of Prey (1937)
- Champions of France (1938)
- The Train for Venice (1938)
