= You Will Be a Duchess =

- Directed by: René Guissart
- Written by: Yves Mirande
- Starring: Marie Glory; Fernand Gravey; Pierre Etchepare
- Music by: Francis Gromon
- Production company: Les Studios Paramount
- Distributed by: Les Films Paramount
- Release date: 12 February 1932
- Running time: 85 minutes
- Country: France
- Language: French

You Will Be a Duchess (French: Tu seras Duchesse) is a 1932 French romantic comedy film directed by René Guissart and starring Marie Glory, Fernand Gravey and Pierre Etchepare. It was made at the Joinville Studios by the French subsidiary of Paramount Pictures.

== Cast ==
- Marie Glory as Annette Poisson
- Fernand Gravey as Marquis André de la Cour
- Pierre Etchepare as Le duc de Barfleur fils
- Geneviève Doriane as Couquette
- Pierre Feuillère as Leon
- Paul Clerget as Le duc de Barfleur père
- Jean Gobet as Le docteur
- Claude Marty as L'abbé
- André Berley as Monsieur Poisson
- Fifiou
- Sem
- Geo Leroy
- Habib Benglia

== Bibliography ==
- Dayna Oscherwitz & MaryEllen Higgins. The A to Z of French Cinema. Scarecrow Press, 2009.
