= Christian Casadesus =

French actor and theatre director (1912–2014)

- Born: Christian Henri Louis André Casadesus; 26 December 1912; Paris, France
- Died: 6 March 2014 (aged 101); Villeneuve-Saint-Georges, Val-de-Marne, France
- Occupation: Actor
- Years active: 1930–1954
- Father: Henri Casadesus
- Relatives: Gisèle Casadesus (sister)

Christian Henri Louis André Casadesus (26 December 1912 – 6 March 2014) was a French actor and theatre director who worked professionally in both movies and in theater.

== Career ==
Casadesus was born in Paris on 26 December 1912. His father, Henri Casadesus, was a musician and composer, and his mother, Marie-Louise Beetz, a harpist. He made his first film appearance in 1930. He studied acting at the CNSAD with Louis Jouvet and gave his debut at the theater in 1937. In 1939 he was drafted into the army during the Phoney War. In 1942, he played Hamlet at the Théâtre Hébertot.

In 1948, he ran a jazz club with Freddy Chauvelot, the Club Saint-Germain, which staged musicians and singers such as Django Reinhardt, Juliette Gréco, and Boris Vian. Casadesus played Philibert Le Roy in the 1953 film Si Versailles m'était conté de Sacha Guitry, his last film role. From 1954 to 1966, he was the artistic director of the Théâtre de l'Ambigu-Comique. Afterwards, he undertook several missions for the French Ministry of Culture.

He was the brother of the French stage and film actress Gisèle Casadesus (1914–2017), whose eldest son is the conductor Jean-Claude Casadesus. He was briefly married with the singer Micheline Ramette and had a son with her, Frédérick Casadesus, born in 1959.

== Death ==
Casadesus died in Villeneuve-Saint-Georges, Val-de-Marne on 6 March 2014, aged 101. His sister, was theatre and film actress Gisèle Casadesus, who died 3 years later in 2017, aged 103.

== Selected filmography ==
- The Star of Valencia (1933)
- Rothchild (1934)
