= Roger Bontemps =

Roger Bontemps is semi-mythical French figure who personifies a state of leisure and freedom from care. According to Pierre-Jean de Béranger, Roger Bontemps is the epitome of "Never say die".

== Literary origins ==
The figure first appears as a literary character in Le Livre du Cuers d'Amours Espris (The Book of the Love-Smitten Heart) attributed to René of Anjou (1409–1480), also known as "Good King René". In this allegory of love, written ca. 1457–77, "Rogier Bon Temps" is the only character who refuses to surrender his heart to the God of Love.

== Later literature ==
Roger Bontemps appears several times in French literature, such as in a play by André Rivoire.

The figure also appears in a poem by William Makepeace Thackeray, first published in his 1852 anthology The Paris Sketchbook.

Vous riches, desireux;
Vous, dont le char dévie
Après un cours heureux;
Vous, qui perdrez peut-être
Des titres éclatans,
Eh! gai! prenez pour mâitre
Le gros Roger Bontemps.

Ye poor, with envy goaded;
Ye rich, for more who long;
Ye who by fortune loaded,
Find all things going wrong
Ye who by some disaster
See all your cables break,
From henceforth for your master
Bluff Roger Bontemps take.
