= Piano Concerto No. 10 (Mozart) =

1779 two-piano concerto by W. A. Mozart

Concerto No. 10 for two pianos
- by W. A. Mozart
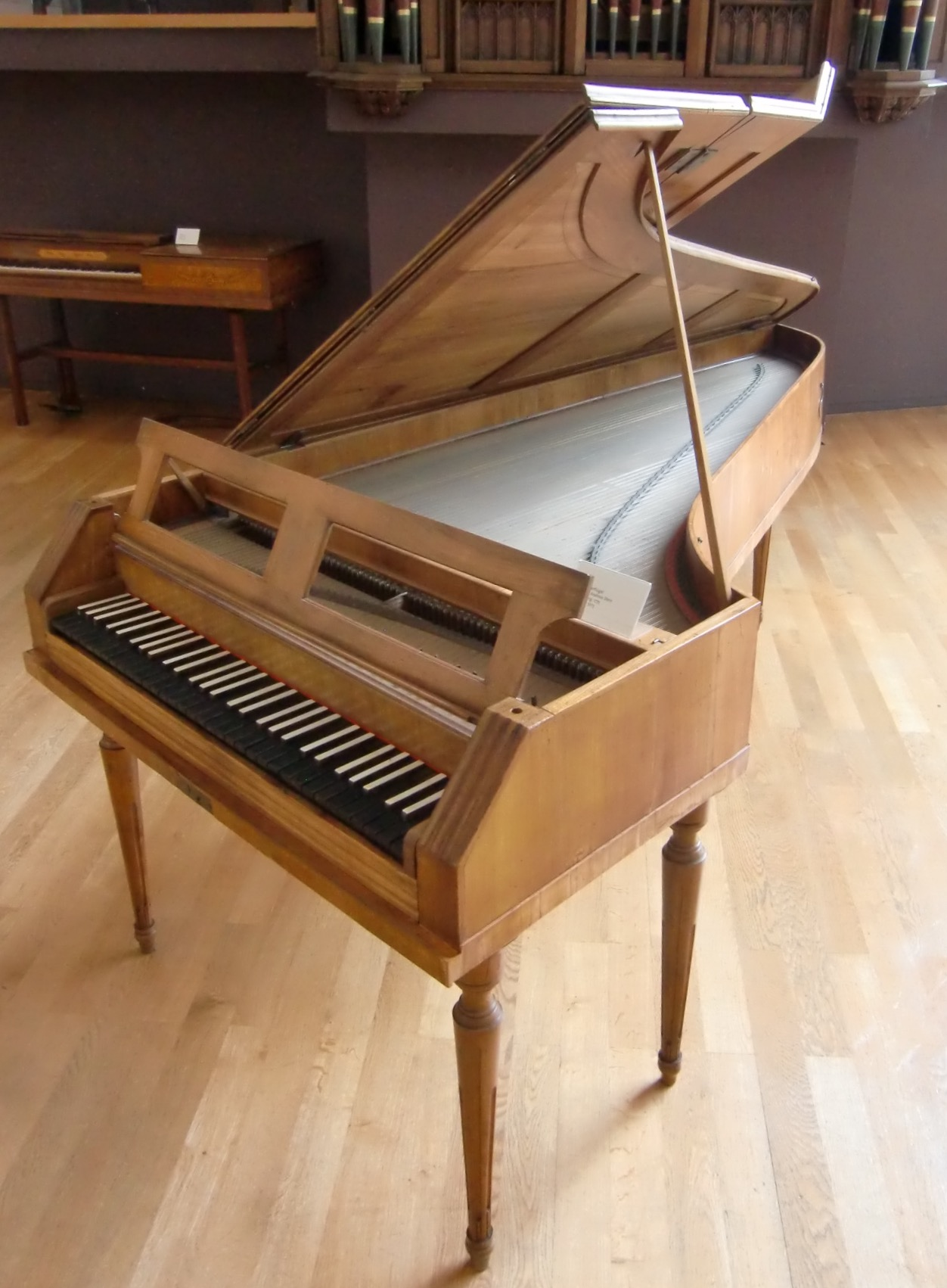
- Fortepiano by Johann Andreas Stein (Augsburg, 1775) – Berlin Musical Instrument Museum
- Key: E-flat major
- Catalogue: K. 365
- Composed: 1779
- Movements: Three (Allegro, Andante, Rondo: Allegro)
- Scoring: 2 pianos; orchestra

I. Allegro

II. Andante

III. Rondo: Allegro
Performed by Robert Casadesus, Gaby Casadesus and the Cleveland Orchestra, George Szell conducting

It is not known when Mozart completed his Concerto for Two Pianos and Orchestra in E-flat major, K. 365/316a, but research by Alan Tyson shows that cadenzas for the first and third movements are written in his and his father's handwriting on a type of paper used between August 1775 and January 1777. However, most sources, including Tyson's book Mozart: Studies of the Autograph Scores or more recently Lindeman's The Concerto: A Research and Information Guide (2006) indicate that it was composed in 1779. It is presumed that Mozart wrote it to play with his sister Maria Anna ("Nannerl"). Years later he performed it in a private concert with pupil Josepha Barbara Auernhammer.

== Music ==
The concerto was originally scored for two fortepianos together with two oboes, two bassoons, two horns in E♭, and strings. Mozart expanded the score in 1782 with pairs of clarinets, trumpets and timpani. However, the authenticity of the additions is not beyond question; they do not appear in the score.

The work is in three movements:

1. Allegro,
2. Andante, B♭ major, 3/4
3. Rondo: Allegro, 2/4

The concerto departs from the usual solo piano concerto with the dialogue between the two pianos as they exchange musical ideas. Mozart divides up the more striking passages quite evenly between the two pianos. Also, the orchestra is rather more quiet than in Mozart's other piano concertos, leaving much of the music to the soloists.

The first movement is lyrical and "wonderfully spacious, as if Mozart is thoroughly enjoying himself and letting his ideas flow freely", as Ledbetter has noted. The middle movement is slow and refined; the orchestra stays in the background behind the pair of playful pianists. The finale is a rondo filled with rhythmic drive and, after passages of lyrical grace, there is an exuberant return to the main rondo theme.
