= Jacques Clancy =

French actor (1920–2012)

- Born: Jacques, Michel Clancy; 17 May 1920; Eysines (Gironde)
- Died: 19 May 2012 (aged 92)
- Occupation(s): Stage and film actor

Jacques Clancy (17 May 1920 - 19 May 2012) was a French actor, sociétaire of the Comédie-Française.

== Filmography ==
- 1938 : Carrefour by Kurt Bernhardt
- 1945 : A Friend Will Come Tonight by Raymond Bernard - Jacques Leroy
- 1950 : Darling Caroline by Richard Pottier - Georges Berthier
- 1950 : Sous le ciel de Paris by Julien Duvivier - Armand Maistre
- 1951 : Two Pennies Worth of Violets by Jean Anouilh - André Delgrange
- 1952 : The Green Glove by Rudolph Maté and Louis A. Pascal - Ivan
- 1953 : The Lady of the Camellias by Raymond Bernard - Gaston Rieux
- 1954 : The Red and the Black by Claude Autant-Lara
- 1955 : Impasse des vertus by Pierre Méré - Le docteur Alain Delaunay
- 1955 : Marguerite de la nuit de Claude Autant-Lara - Angelo
- 1956 : Un matin comme les autres by Yannick Bellon - short film - Le commissaire
- 1957 : In Case of Adversity by Claude Autant-Lara - Maître Duret, l'assistant de l'avocat Maître Gobillot

== Theatre ==
- 1939 : Asmodée by François Mauriac, Jacques Copeau - Harry Fanning
- 1942 : On ne badine pas avec l'amour by Alfred de Musset, mise en scène Louis Jouvet, tour in South America
- 1949 : Joanna of Castile by François Aman-Jean, mise en scène Jean Meyer, Comédie-Française at Théâtre de l'Odéon
- 1950 : La Belle Aventure by Gaston Arman de Caillavet, Robert de Flers and Étienne Rey, mise en scène Jean Debucourt, Comédie-Française
- 1950 : Les Sincères by Marivaux, mise en scène Véra Korène, Comédie-Française
- 1957 : Histoire de rire by Armand Salacrou, mise en scène Jean Meyer, Théâtre des Célestins
