= Robert Wyler =

American film producer (1900–1971)

- Born: September 25, 1900; Mülhausen, Alsace-Lorraine, German Empire
- Died: January 17, 1971 (aged 70); Los Angeles, California, U.S.
- Occupation: Producer
- Years active: 1923–1961
- Spouse: Cathy O'Donnell (m. 1948; died 1970)

Robert Wyler (September 25, 1900 – January 17, 1971) was an American film producer and associate producer. He was the older brother of film director William Wyler and a nephew of Universal Studios head Carl Laemmle.

Wyler was born in Mülhausen, Alsace, Germany (now Mulhouse, Haut-Rhin, France). His first credit was as a producer in 1928, and he made several unsuccessful attempts at directing in the early 1930s.

Wyler found success in the late 1940s and 1950s. He was associate producer of his brother's adaptation of The Heiress (1949), which was nominated for Best Film at the Academy Awards and won its star, Olivia de Havilland, her second Oscar. Wyler was nominated for Best Screenplay for Detective Story (1951), another film directed by his brother and a controversial hit in its day. He was involved as an associate producer on most of his brother's films through the 1950s, such as Roman Holiday (1953) and Friendly Persuasion (1956).

Then 47-year-old Wyler married 24-year-old actress Cathy O'Donnell on April 11, 1948. They had met two years earlier while she was being directed by his brother in The Best Years of Our Lives. She died in 1970 on their 22nd wedding anniversary, following a long illness. Robert Wyler died nine months later on January 17, 1971.

== Partial filmography ==
- A Father Without Knowing It (1932)
- The Wonderful Day (1932)
- It Happened in Paris (1935)
- The Heiress (1949)
- Detective Story (1951)
- Roman Holiday (1953)
- Friendly Persuasion (1956)
- The Big Country (1958)
- The Children's Hour (1961)
