= Gaby Casadesus =

French classical pianist and teacher

External audio
- Gaby and Robert Casadesus performing Mozart's Piano Concerto No. 10 in E-flat major, K. 365, for two pianos with George Szell conducting the Cleveland Orchestra in 1955]

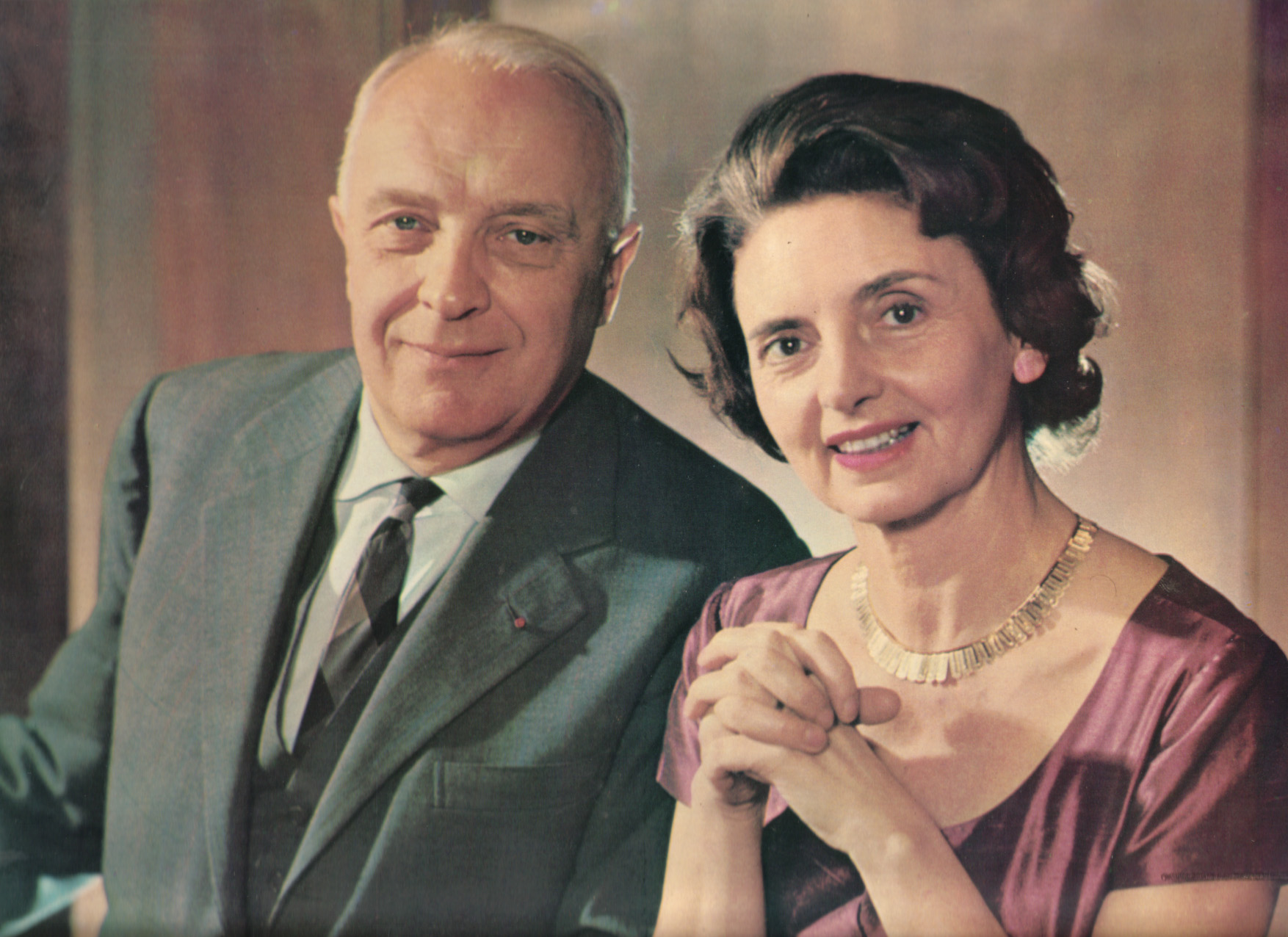
Robert and Gaby Casadesus

Gaby Casadesus (August 9, 1901 – November 12, 1999) was a French classical pianist and teacher born in Marseille. She was married to the French pianist Robert Casadesus and their son Jean was also a notable pianist.

== Biography ==
Born Gabrielle l'Hôte, she studied at the Paris Conservatory with Louis Diémer and Marguerite Long and was awarded the first prize in piano at age 16. She met Claude Debussy at this time, as he was the judge for one of her competitions. She was also friendly with Debussy's daughter Claude-Emma who died soon after of diphtheria. Gaby later won the Prix Pagès, which was the most prestigious award in France at the time for which women were eligible.

In 1921, she married the pianist Robert Casadesus and with him formed the Robert and Gaby Casadesus duo. The duo made many recordings of the four-hand piano repertoire. However, Gaby was also a significant soloist. She knew Maurice Ravel, Gabriel Fauré, Florent Schmitt and Moritz Moszkowski, and her interpretations were aided by their guidance. Her repertoire also included Felix Mendelssohn, whose music she effectively championed, and the keyboard composers of the Baroque era.

As a teacher, Gaby Casadesus taught in the US, at the Salzburg Mozarteum, at the Académie Maurice Ravel in Saint-Jean-de-Luz and at the American Conservatoire at Fontainebleau. Among her notable pupils are Donna Amato, David Deveau, Rudy Toth, and Vladimir Valjarević.

In 1941, she played in New Jersey in a concert with Albert Einstein, in one of his rare appearances as a musician for an event to raise money for World War Two refugees.

After her husband's death in 1972, she worked with Grant Johannesen and Odette Valabrègue Wurtzburger, to found the Robert Casadesus International Piano Competition, which in 1994 became the Cleveland International Piano Competition.

Casadesus died in Paris on November 12, 1999, aged 98. She is buried with her husband and son, Jean in Recloses, department of Seine-et-Marne, approximately 73 kilometres (45 miles) southeast of Paris.
