= Jean Casadesus =

French classical pianist (1927–1972)

External audio
- You may hear Jean Casadesus], Robert Casadesus, Gaby Casadesus and Eugene Ormandy conducting the Philadelphia Orchestra playing Mozart's Concerto for Three Pianos and Orchestra in F major No. 7, K. 242 in 1963; Here on Archive.org

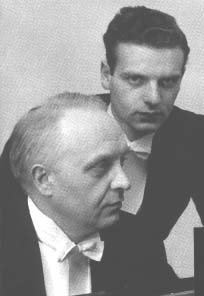
Robert and Jean Casadesus

Jean Claude Michel Casadesus (17 July 1927 – 20 January 1972) was a French classical pianist. He was the son of the renowned pianists Robert and Gaby Casadesus, and grandnephew of Henri Casadesus and Marius Casadesus.

Jean Casadesus was born in Paris. He was taught to play piano by his parents and studied at the Conservatoire de Paris before going to the United States to continue his studies at Princeton University.

He made his debut with the Philadelphia Orchestra conducted by Eugene Ormandy in 1947 and thereafter enjoyed success as a concert pianist and also as a piano teacher, principally at the American Conservatory at Fontainebleau. His notable students include Robert D. Levin.

From 1965 until his death, Casadesus was artist in residence and instructor at the State University of New York at Binghamton.

Jean and his parents performed Mozart's concertos for 2 and 3 pianos. They recorded these works with the Columbia Symphony and Cleveland Orchestra conducted by George Szell and with the Philadelphia Orchestra under the baton of Eugene Ormandy.

In 1953 he married Evie Girard, the daughter of the painter André Girard. Jean and Evie Casadesus had one child, a daughter Agnès.

Jean Casadesus died in a car crash near Renfrew, Ontario Canada on January 20, 1972. He was a passenger in one vehicle traveling between engagements. The driver was attempting to pass another vehicle when he collided head-on with another car immediately killing that vehicle's two occupants and Casadesus. Robert Casadesus died in September 1972 in Paris.
