= Robert Casadesus =

French pianist and composer (1899–1972)

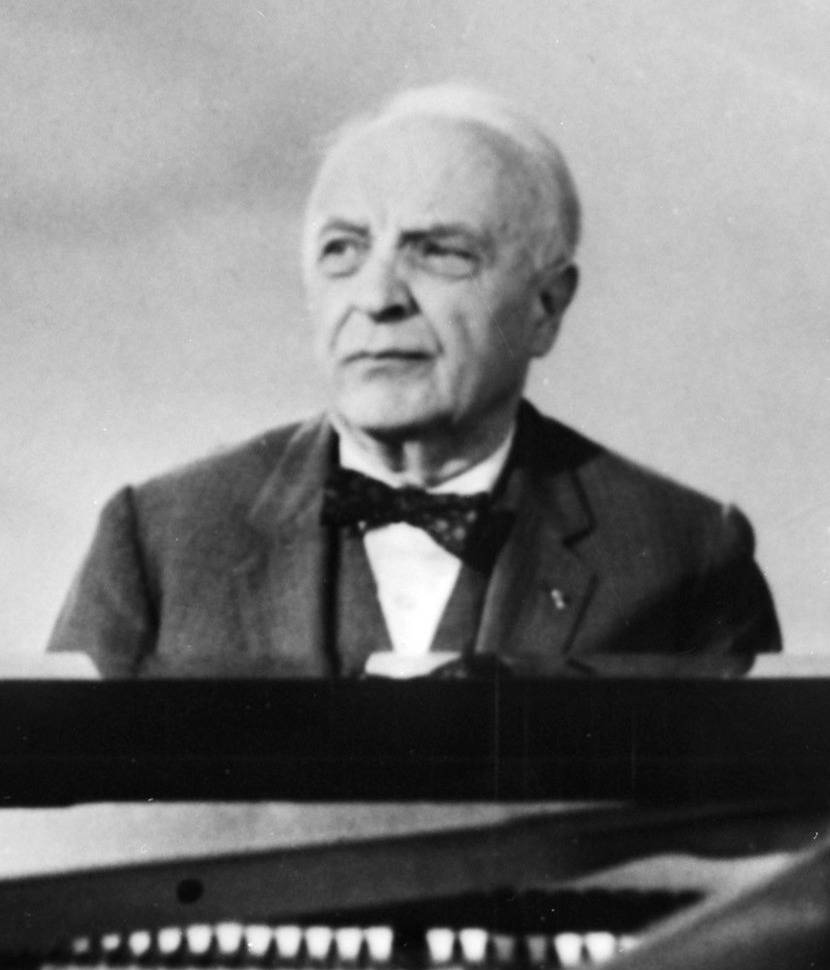
- Casadesus performing in 1972
- Born: 7 April 1899; Paris, France
- Died: 19 September 1972 (aged 73); Paris, France
- Occupations: Pianist; composer

Robert Marcel Casadesus (French pronunciation: [kazadˈsy]; 7 April 1899 – 19 September 1972) was a French pianist and composer. He was the most prominent member of a distinguished musical family, being the nephew of Henri Casadesus and Marius Casadesus, husband of Gaby Casadesus, and father of Jean Casadesus.

== Biography ==
Casadesus was born in Paris, and studied there at the Conservatoire with Louis Diémer, taking a Premier Prix (First Prize) in 1913 and the Prix Diémer in 1920. He entered the class of Lucien Capet, who had exceptional influence. Capet had founded a famous quartet that bore his name (Capet Quartet) and in which two of Robert's uncles played: Henri and Marcel. The Quartet often rehearsed in the Casadesus home, and so it was that Robert was exposed to chamber music. The Beethoven Quartets held no secret for him—he knew them backward and forwards.

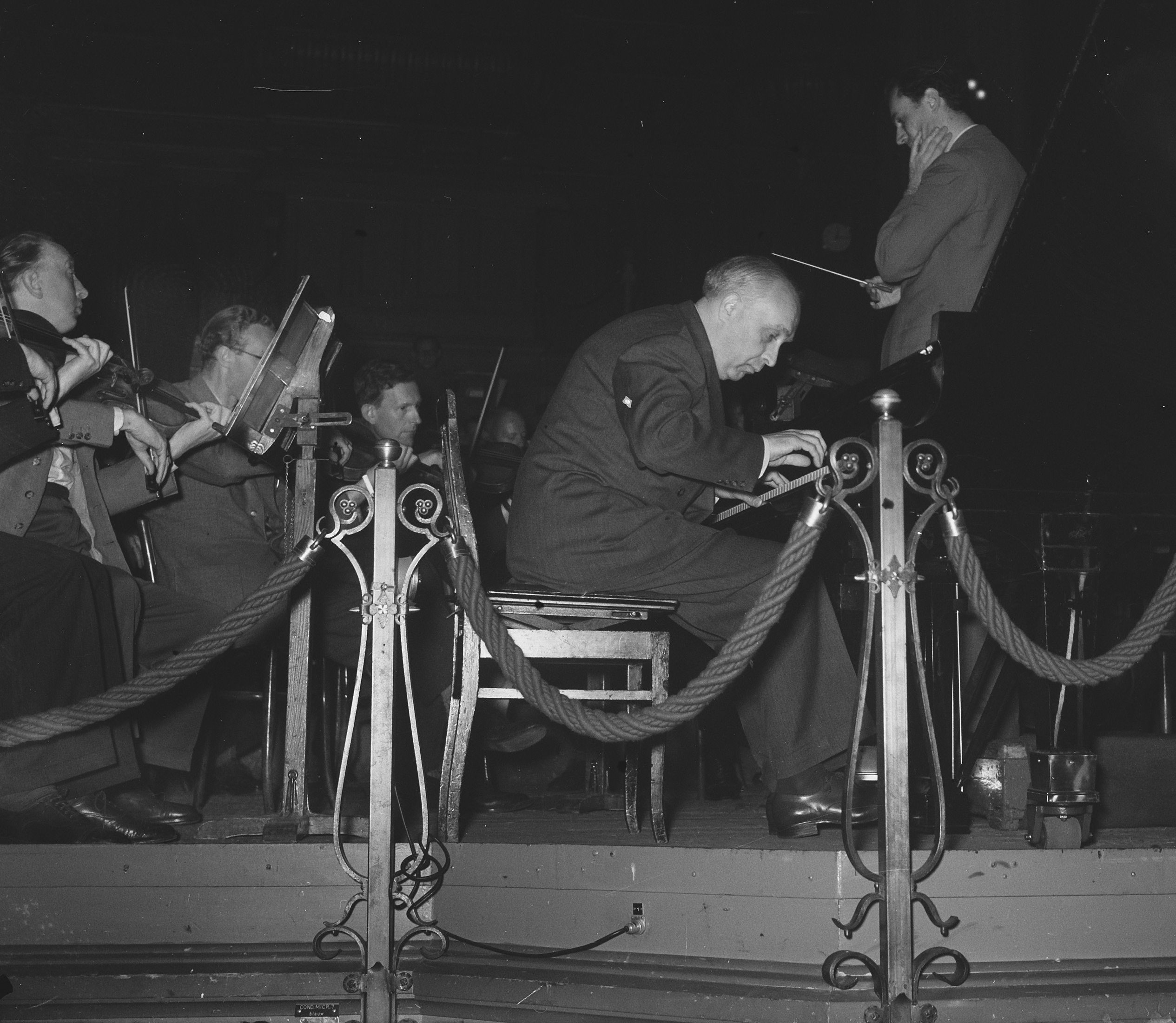
Casadesus at the Concertgebouw (1951)

Beginning in 1922, Casadesus collaborated with the composer Maurice Ravel on a project to create piano rolls of a number of his works. Casadesus and Ravel also shared the concert platform in France, Spain and England. Casadesus toured widely as a piano soloist and often performed with his wife, the pianist Gaby (L'Hôte) Casadesus, whom he married in 1921.

From 1935 Casadesus taught at the American Conservatory at Fontainebleau. He and his family spent the Second World War years in the United States and had a home in Princeton, New Jersey. (Among his Princeton neighbors was Albert Einstein, an amateur violinist; the two played Mozart together privately on occasion).

After the Fall of France in 1940, Robert and Gaby established the Fontainebleau School at Newport, Rhode Island. In 1942 the Fontainebleau School was moved to Great Barrington, Massachusetts, in the Berkshires. In 1943, he performed as part of a series of New York concerts meant to raise money for the Coordinating Council of the French Relief Societies.

After the war, in 1946, Robert Casadesus, now Director of the American Conservatory, oversaw its return to Fontainebleau. His pupils included Claude Helffer, Grant Johannesen, Olive Nelson Russell, Beveridge Webster, Monique Haas, Mary Louise Boehm, Pauline Boehm, Carol Lems-Dworkin, and William Eves (who appeared in the Casadesus-based Bell Telephone Hour fine arts documentary TV series The First Family of the Piano (1967) and was a longtime piano instructor at Bowdoin College.) He continued recording and composing; his last composition, the Symphony No. 7, "Israel," was a tribute to the people of Israel and was dedicated to his frequent collaborator George Szell; Szell died in the year the work was completed, 1970, and it was not premiered until shortly after Casadesus's 1972 death, by an ensemble led by conductor Frederic Waldmann at Alice Tully Hall in New York City.

Robert and Gaby Casadesus had three children, Jean, Guy and Therese. Casadesus died in Paris, 19 September 1972, after a brief illness and only a few months after the death of his son Jean in an automobile accident. Gaby Casadesus died in Paris on 12 November 1999. In her later years she edited the works of Ravel for G. Schirmer, Inc.

== Legacy ==
A product of the school of French pianism, his style of playing was classical and restrained with a very delicate approach to melody and line. He is especially noted as an interpreter of Mozart. Among his other recordings are those of the complete piano music of Ravel (for which he was awarded the Grand Prix de l'Academie Charles Cros and the Grand Prix de l'Academie du Disque), and the Beethoven Violin Sonatas with Zino Francescatti (of which the Kreutzer Sonata was filmed and has been released on DVD). The Bell Telephone Hour, a fine arts-related television series broadcast on NBC for many years, produced a one-hour television film, in 1967, on Robert, Gaby and their son Jean, titled The First Family of the Piano.

== Recordings ==
External audio
- You may hear Robert Casadesus performing Wolfgang Amadeus Mozart's Piano Concertos: No. 10 in E flat major, K. 365 For two pianos No. 12 in A major, K.414; No. 18 in B flat major, K. 456; No. 20 in D Minor, K.466 with George Szell conducting the Cleveland Orchestra with Gaby Casadesus in 1955-1956 Here on archive.org

Casadesus was particularly known for his recordings of Mozart concertos. He recorded Mozart's Piano Concerto No. 27 in B-flat with John Barbirolli and the New York Philharmonic in 1941. Later, Casadesus made LP recordings of a number of Mozart's piano concertos with George Szell and the Cleveland Orchestra (sometimes billed as the Columbia Symphony for contractual reasons), including nos. 12, 15, 17, 18, 20, 21, 22, 23, 24, 26, and 27, often featuring his own cadenzas. Casadesus was joined by his wife Gaby and their son Jean in recordings of Mozart's concertos for two and three pianos, accompanied by the Philadelphia Orchestra conducted by Eugene Ormandy. These recordings have been reissued on CD several times by Sony Classical.

He also made recordings of four of Bach's concertos for two and three keyboards, issued by Columbia, under the batons of Eugene Ormandy, Pierre Dervaux, and Edmond de Stoutz. Of Beethoven's five concertos, Casadesus recorded the First, Fourth, and Fifth, the last two multiple times and the Fourth with his own cadenzas. He also recorded several Beethoven sonatas, for both solo piano and for violin and piano, with his frequent recording partner Zino Francescatti.

Casadesus was also particularly known for his recordings of French repertoire by composers such as Rameau, Chabrier, Fauré, Debussy, and Ravel. In 1951, Casadesus made the first integral recording of the complete solo piano works by Ravel on three LPs for Columbia. He also recorded French works for four hands and two pianos with his wife Gaby.

In addition, Casadesus' recorded output includes works by Scarlatti, Schubert, Schumann, and Chopin, as well as Manuel de Falla's Nights in the Gardens of Spain. Casadesus also recorded a number of his own compositions.

== Critical assessment ==
In The Art of the Piano, David Dubal writes of Casadesus: "he became the absolute French pianist, his country's finest. Casadesus embodied the qualities of Gallic balance, unforced sound, style, and precision of technique. His sound was crisp, dry, and sparkling, like a vintage champagne. Casadesus was a sophisticated musician, whose pianism was phenomenally supple. His range was wide and his use of the pedals was simply astonishing."

== Honors and awards ==
- Commander of the Order of Legion of Honour
- Officer of the Order of Leopold (Belgium)

== Works ==
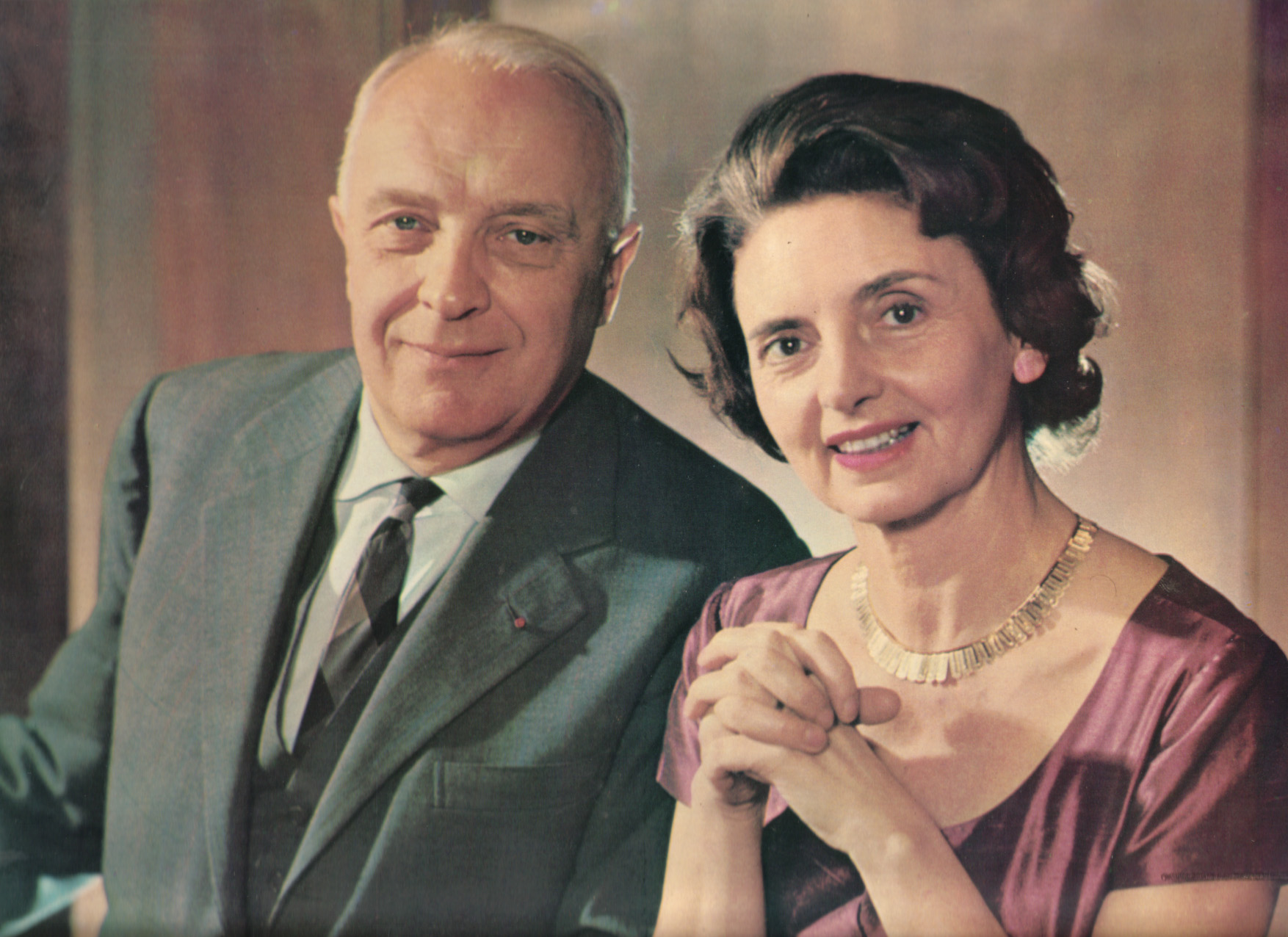
Robert and Gaby Casadesus External audio: You may hear Robert Casadesus, Gaby Casadesus, Jean Casadesus, and Eugene Ormandy conducting the Philadelphia Orchestra playing Mozart's Concerto for Three Pianos and Orchestra in F major No. 7, K. 242 in 1963; Here on Archive.org

=== Orchestral ===
- Suite No. 1, Op. 11 (1927)
- Symphony No. 1 in D major, Op. 19 (1934)
- Suite No. 2, Op. 26 (1937)
- Symphony No. 2, Op. 32 (1941)
- Suite No. 3, Op. 33 (1942)
- Symphony No. 3, Op. 41 (1947)
- Symphony No. 4, Op. 50 (1954)
- Trois danses (3 Dances), Op. 54b (1956)
- Symphony No. 5 "sur le nom de Haydn" (On the Name of Haydn), Op. 60 (1959)
- Septet for string orchestra, Op. 64 (1961); original for 2 violins, 2 violas, 2 cellos and double bass
- Symphony No. 6, Op. 66 (1965)
- Symphony No. 7 for chorus and orchestra, "Israel," Op. 68 (1967–70)

=== Concertante ===
- Concerto No. 1 for piano and orchestra, Op. 7 (1926)
- Concerto for violin and orchestra, Op. 15 (1931)
- Concerto for 2 pianos and orchestra, Op. 17 (1933)
- Concertstück (Concert Piece) for piano and chamber orchestra, Op. 27 (1937)
- Concerto for flute and chamber orchestra, Op. 35 (1942)
- Concerto No. 2 "for Dimitri Mitropoulos" for piano and orchestra, Op. 37 (1944)
- Concerto for cello and orchestra, Op. 43 (1947)
- Capriccio for piano and string orchestra, Op. 49 (1952)
- Concerto No. 3 for piano and orchestra, Op. 63 (1961)
- Concerto for 3 pianos and string orchestra, Op. 65 (1964)

=== Chamber music ===
- "Deux Pieces" for harp (Billaudot)
- Introduction et polonaise for cello and piano, Op. 4 (1924)
- Piano Trio No. 1, Op. 6 (1924)
- Sonata No. 1 for violin and piano, Op. 9 (1927)
- Quintet for flute, violin, viola, cello and harp, Op. 10 (1927)
- Sonata for viola and piano, Op. 12 (1928)
- String Quartet No. 1, Op. 13 (1929)
- Piano Quintet in D minor, Op. 16 (1932)
- Sonata for flute and piano, Op. 18 (1934)
- Deux pièces (2 Pieces) for harp, Op. 20 (1935)
- Sonata for cello and piano, Op. 22 (1935)
- Sonata for oboe (or clarinet) and piano, Op. 23 (1936)
- Trois intermezzi (3 Intermezzi) for woodwind quintet, Op. 24 (1936)
- String Trio, Op. 25 (1937)
- String Quartet No. 2, Op. 29 (1940)
- Piano Quartet, Op. 30 (1940)
- Sonata No. 2 for violin and piano, Op. 34 (1942)
- Suite for 2 solo violins, Op. 39 (1944)
- Trio for oboe, clarinet and bassoon, Op. 42 (1947)
- Nonetto for string quartet, wind quartet and piano, Op. 45 (1949)
- String Quartet No. 3, Op. 46 (1950)
- Hommage à Chausson (Homage to Chausson) for violin and piano, Op. 51 (1954)
- Piano Trio No. 2, Op. 53 (1956)
- String Quartet No. 4, Op. 55 (1957)
- Sextet for woodwinds and piano, Op. 58 (1958)
- Fantaisie for flute and piano, Op. 59 (1959)
- Deux pièces (2 Pieces) for bassoon and piano, Op. 61 (1960)
- Septet for 2 violins, 2 violas, 2 cellos and double bass (or string orchestra), Op. 64 (1961)

=== Piano ===
- Le voyage imaginaire (The Imaginary Trip), Op. 1 (1916)
- Six pièces (6 Pieces) for 2 pianos, Op. 2 (1920)
- Vingt-quatre préludes (24 Préludes), Op. 5 (1924)
- Trois berceuses (3 Lullabies), Op. 8 (1926)
- Sonata No. 1, Op. 14 (1930)
- Huit études (8 Études), Op. 28 (1939)
- Sonata No. 2, Op. 31 (1941)
- Trois danses méditerranéennes (3 Mediterranean Dances) for 2 pianos, Op. 36 (1943)
- Chant pour la libération de Paris (Song for the Liberation of Paris) for 2 pianos, Op. 38 (1944)
- Toccata, Op. 40 (1946)
- Sonata No. 3, Op. 44 (1948)
- Six enfantines, Op. 48 (1950)
- Variations d'après l'hommage à Debussy de M. de Falla (Variations on Manuel de Falla's "Hommage à Debussy"), Op. 47 (1951)
- Suite en La (Suite in A), Op. 52 (1956)
- Trois danses (3 Dances), Op. 54a (1956)
- Sonata No. 4, Op. 56 (1957)
- Sonata for 2 pianos, Op. 62 (1960)
- Trois berceuses (3 Lullabies), Op. 67 (1966)
- Impromptu, Op. 67 No. 4 (1967)

=== Vocal ===
- Spleen for voice and orchestra, Op.3 (1923)
- Trois rondels pour après for voice and piano, Op. 21 (1935)
- Sept épigrammes sur des tombeaux grecs for voice and orchestra, Op. 57 (1958)
