= André Rivoire =

French poet and playwright

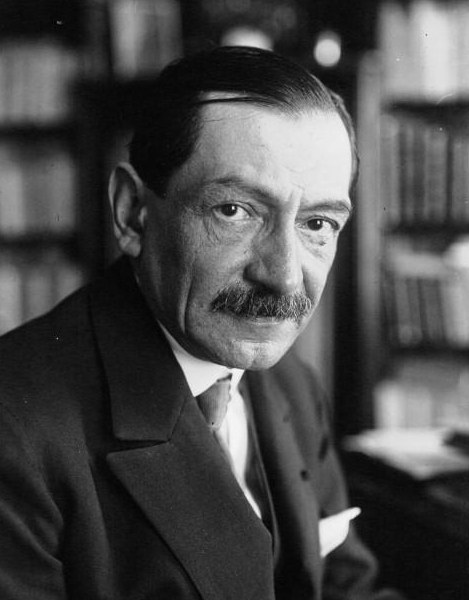
André Rivoire 1922.

André Rivoire (5 May 1872 – 19 August 1930) was a French poet and playwright whose work was defined by the delicate precision of his observation.

== Life and work ==
Rivoire was born in Vienne, Isère, in eastern France. He studied at the Lycée de Lyon and then at Lycée Henri-IV. A student of Henri Bergson, he showed an early interest in poetry, publishing under the pseudonym "André Suzel".

After a collection of poetry, Les Vierges (Virgins) (1895) and a dramatic fantasy Berthe aux grands pieds (Bertha Broadfoot) (1899), he published Le Songe de l'Amour '(The Dream of Love) (1900) and Le Chemin de l'Oubli (The Way of Forgetfulness) (1904), both in an intimate vein.

Among his eighteen plays, notable are Le Bon Roi Dagobert (Good King Dagobert) (1908) and Roger Bontemps (1920). His dramatic work has a light and delicate touch displaying deft and precise psychological observation. The poet Sully Prudhomme said of his play The Little Shepherdess, to which he wrote a preface, "The author has described some extremely delicate states of the soul, using only the traditional resources of versification."

== Works ==
=== Theatre ===
Roger Bontemps, play in three acts, verse represented for the first time on 13 March 1920 at the Théâtre National de l'Odéon
