= Jean-Claude Casadesus =

French conductor

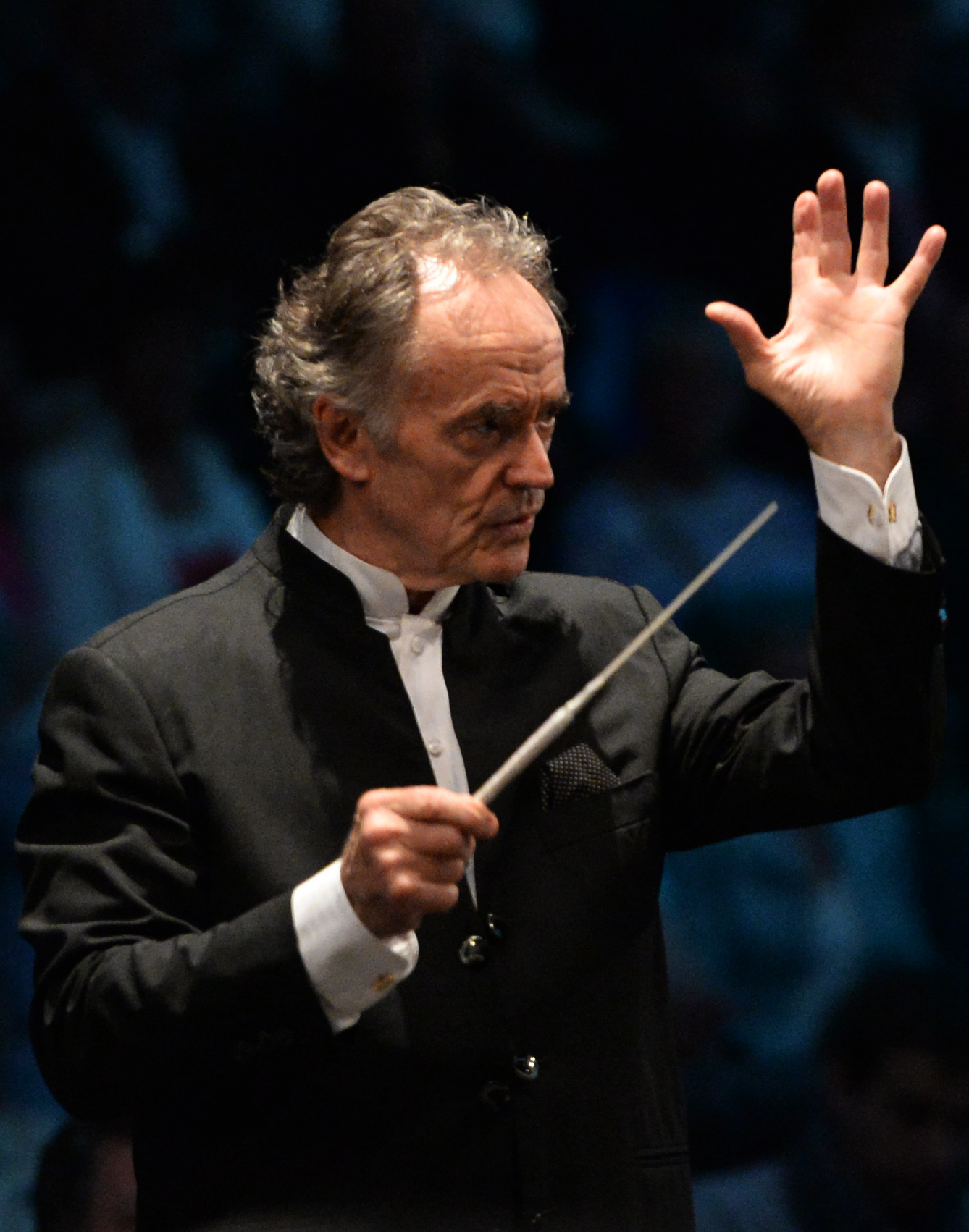
Jean-Claude Casadesus while conducting

Jean-Claude Probst (born 7 December 1935), known professionally as Jean-Claude Casadesus, is a French conductor.

== Biography ==
Casadesus was born in Paris on 7 December 1935, the son of actress Gisèle Casadesus and her husband Lucien Pascal. He began his career as a percussionist before studying composition and conducting with Pierre Dervaux and Pierre Boulez.

In 1969 he was hired as assistant conductor at the Paris Opéra and the Opéra-Comique. In 1971 he co-founded the Orchestre National des Pays de la Loire with Pierre Dervaux, and acted as Dervaux's deputy there until 1976. In 1976 he became principal conductor of the Orchestre national de Lille, performing concerts locally and internationally. He directed the French Youth Orchestra in 2007.

== Personal life ==
Jean-Claude has been married twice and has three children, his only daughter Caroline (b. 30 October 1962) is an opera singer and his first born son Sebastian Copeland (b. 3 April 1964) is a film director whose mother is Pénélope Copeland, his second son Olivier (b. 2 September 1970) is an actor whose mother is Anne Sevestre.

== Distinctions ==
- Grand officier de la Légion d'honneur
- Commandeur de l'Ordre national du Mérite
- Commandeur des Arts et Lettres
- Commandeur de l'Ordre d'Orange-Nassau
- Officier de l'Ordre de Léopold de Belgique
- Chevalier des Palmes Académiques

In 2004, the Victoires de la musique classique awarded him a victory of honour.

== Discography with l'Orchestre National de Lille ==
- Richard Wagner, Ouvertures et monologues célèbres, Le Vaisseau Fantôme, Tännhauser, Les Maîtres chanteurs de Nuremberg, La Walkyrie, avec José van Dam, Label Forlane
- Darius Milhaud, La Création du monde, Le Bœuf sur le toit, Suite Provençale, L'Homme et son Désir, Label Naxos
- Serge Prokofiev, Alexander Nevsky (Cantata), Lieutenant Kijé (Suite), Label Naxos
- Hector Berlioz, La Damnation de Faust, Label Naxos
- Hector Berlioz, Symphonie Fantastique, Label Harmonia Mundi
- Joseph Canteloube, Chants d'Auvergne, Label Naxos
- Gustav Mahler, Symphonies, Label Forlane
- Georges Bizet, Clovis et Clotilde - Te Deum, Label Naxos - Abeille Musique, 2010

== Published works ==
- Casadesus, Jean-Claude (1997). Le plus court chemin d'un cœur à un autre: histoire d'une passion. Paris: Stock. ISBN 978-2234047549.

| Preceded by Aucun (création de l'orchestre) | Chef principal, Orchestre national de Lille; 1976- | Succeeded by... |
| Preceded by Emmanuel Krivine | Directeur musical, Orchestre français des jeunes 2005-2008 | Succeeded by Dennis Russell Davies |
