= Dominique Probst =

French composer (born 1954)

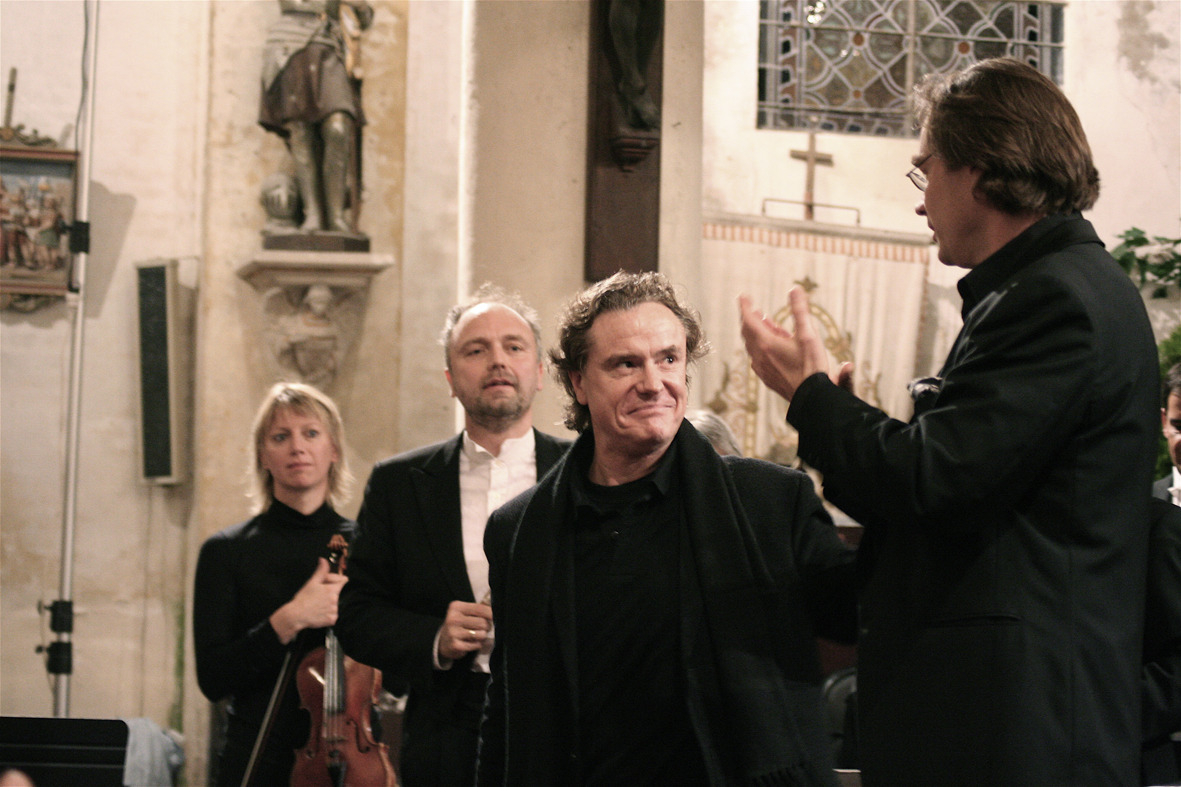
Dominique Probst (center)

Dominique Probst (born 1954) is a French composer.

The son of a noted playwright, Gisèle Casadesus, and an actor and director with the Comédie-Française, Lucien Probst, Dominique Probst won the First Prize for Percussion with the National Music Conservatory, Paris, in 1978. He has also been the timpanist of the Colonne Orchestra since 1973.

In addition to performing as an instrumentalist and being a composer Probst gives instruction in percussion, chamber music, and musical education in various Parisian conservatories.

Foremost among his compositions is his opera Maximilian Kolbe, to a libretto by Eugène Ionesco, about the Polish priest who died to save a fellow inmate in Auschwitz. The opera was first performed in Rimini, Italy in 1988.
