= Marius Casadesus =

French violinist and composer

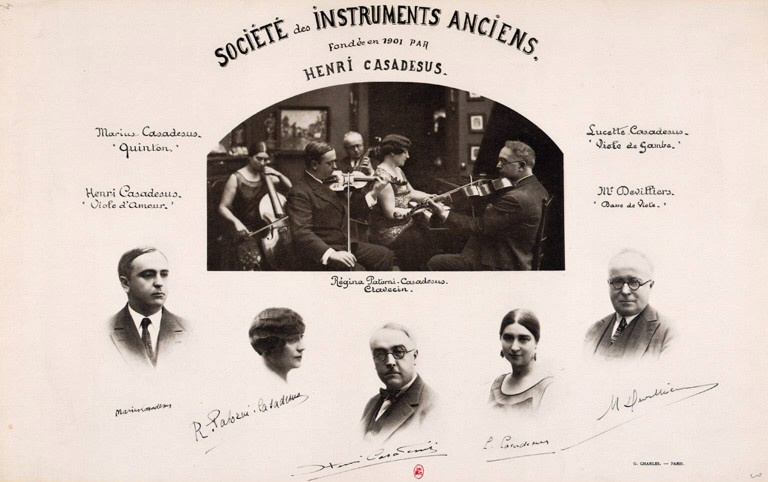
Société des Instruments Anciens fondée en 1901 par Henri Casadesus. Postcard showing Henri, Marius, Lucette, & Régine Casadesus, and M. Devilliers. Bibliothèque nationale de France.

Marius Casadesus (24 October 1892 – 13 October 1981) was a French violinist and composer. He was the brother of Henri Casadesus, uncle of the famed pianist Robert Casadesus, and grand-uncle to Jean Casadesus.

Marius Casadesus achieved perhaps his greatest fame (or notoriety) through his association with the Adélaïde Concerto attributed to Mozart. This concerto was published in 1933 in a piano transcription under Mozart's name, with Casadesus as "editor." Many music scholars believed in its authenticity, and Yehudi Menuhin made a recording of the concerto. It was even given a place in the Köchel-Verzeichnis (the standard catalog of Mozart's works), albeit as "K. Anh. 294a." ("Anh." denotes "Anhang" or "appendix" to the catalog.) However, Mozart expert Alfred Einstein's doubts about this piece were confirmed when Casadesus later admitted his authorship in court in 1977 during a copyright dispute.

Casadesus' brother Henri was also a noted author of musical hoaxes, such as "Handel's Viola concerto in B minor" and "J.C. Bach's Viola Concerto in C minor."

Casadesus is also known for having given the first recital of Ravel's "Tzigane" in the presence of the composer in Barcelona.
