= Gustave Quinson =

French playwright and theatre director (1868–1943)

Victor Gustave Quinson (21 January 1868 – 1 August 1943) was a French playwright and theatre director.

Born in Marseille, Quinson successively or even simultaneously directed, among others, the Theatre moderne, the Gymnase, the Vaudeville, the Bouffes-Parisiens and especially the Théâtre du Palais-Royal from 1910 to 1942. He is also the author of comedies and operettas in collaboration with authors such as Pierre Veber, Tristan Bernard, Albert Willemetz and especially Yves Mirande.

== Life ==
In June 1919, he founded, with Jacques Rouché, Alphonse Franck and Paul Gavault, the Société amicale des directeurs de théâtre, of which Albert Carré was appointed honorary president.

He was knighted in the Legion of Honour in 1920 and became an officer in 1925.

Quinson died in Paris on 1 August 1943 at age 75.

== Works ==
- Le Chasseur de chez Maxim's, comedy in three acts with Yves Mirande, Palais-Royal, 23 December 1920
- Ta bouche, operetta in three acts by Yves Mirande and Gustave Quinson, lyrics by Albert Willemetz, music by Maurice Yvain, Théâtre Daunou, 1 April 1922
- La Merveilleuse Journée, comedy in three acts with Yves Mirande, Palais-Royal, 17 October 1922
- Pourquoi m'as-tu fait ça ?, comedy in three acts by Yves Mirande and Gustave Quinson, Théâtre des Capucines, 22 December 1922
- Là-haut, operetta bouffe in three acts and 4 scenes, music by Maurice Yvain, libretto by Gustave Quinson, Yves Mirande and Albert Willemetz, Théâtre des Bouffes-Parisiens, 31 March 1923
- Embrassez-moi, comedy in three acts with Tristan Bernard and Yves Mirande, Palais-Royal, 23 December 1923
- Miche et son père, comedy with Yves Mirande, Théâtre des Capucines, 11 April 1924
- P. L. aime, musical with Rip and Yves Mirande, music by Henri Christiné, Palais-Royal, 1924
- La Vérité toute nue, comedy in three acts with Pierre Veber, Théâtre de Paris, 1 September 1925
- La Grue du cinquième, comédie-vaudeville with Yves Mirande, Scala, 1927
- Une petite femme dans un lit, comedy with Yves Mirande, Palais-Royal, 1927–28
- La Demoiselle de Mamers, comedy with Yves Mirande, Palais-Royal, 1933
- C'est vous que je veux, comedy with Yves Mirande, Palais-Royal, 1934
- Le Train de 8 heures 47, operetta in three acts and five scenes by Léopold Marchès after Georges Courteline, lyrics by André Barde, music by Charles Cuvillier, Palais-Royal, 22 December 1936 (uncredited)

== Directions ==
- 1902-1914: Théâtre de la tour Eiffel
- 1903-1907: Théâtre Moderne
- 1906-1909: Théâtre Grévin
- 1910-1942: Théâtre du Palais-Royal
- 1912-?: Théâtre du Vaudeville
- 1913: Théâtre de la Renaissance (interim)
- 1913-1929: Théâtre des Bouffes-Parisiens
- 1925-1937: Théâtre de la Michodière
- 1936: Théâtre Pigalle

== Bibliography ==
- Philippe Chauveau, Les Théâtres parisiens disparus (1402-1986), Ed. de l'Amandier, Paris, 1999 ISBN 2-907649-30-2
