= Elizabeth Montgomery (disambiguation) =

Elizabeth Montgomery may refer to:

- Elizabeth Montgomery (1933–1995), American actress
- Elizabeth Montgomery (designer) (1902–1993), English theatre and costume designer
- Elizabeth Bryan Allen (1904–1992), also known as Elizabeth Montgomery, American actress
- Dorothy Elizabeth Montgomery (1924–2009), American baseball player
