= Night Must Fall =

1935 play written by Emlyn Williams

- First edition (1935)
- Written by: Emlyn Williams

Premiere
- Date premiered: 31 May 1935
- Place premiered: Duchess Theatre, London

Night Must Fall is a play, a psychological thriller, by Emlyn Williams, first performed in 1935. There have been four filmed adaptations: Night Must Fall (1937); a 1954 adaptation on the television anthology series Ponds Theater starring Terry Kilburn, Una O'Connor, and Evelyn Varden; a 1957 British television version; and Night Must Fall (1964).

== Play ==
Mrs. Bramson, a bitter, fussy, self-pitying elderly woman, resides in a remote part of Essex, with her intelligent yet subdued niece, Olivia. Mrs Bramson spends all her time complaining while sitting in a wheelchair (although it is revealed during the play that she has in fact no disability whatsoever). She is thoroughly disliked by her two servants, Dora, a young, sensitive maid and Mrs Terrence, the cook, as well as Olivia, whom Mrs. Bramson also treats as a servant.

One day, Dora reveals she is pregnant. Mrs Bramson considers dismissing her, but then decides to persuade the father of Dora's unborn child to marry her. The father turns out to be a suave, handsome young man named Dan. He almost immediately charms Mrs Bramson, causing her to forget all about Dora's pregnancy and take Dan on as her private assistant.

Olivia, however, isn't as taken in by the charming Dan as her aunt is; she feels that he is putting on a facade and lying to hide something sinister. Her suspicions grow when, a few days later, it is reported that a local beauty has gone missing. Believing Dan to be involved, she, the servants, and her pompous admirer, Hubert, go through Dan's things when he is not around, finding a picture of him and the missing woman buried among his belongings. This shocking discovery strengthens Olivia's suspicions and determination to prove that Dan is not what he seems.

Then one night, a human hand is found in the rubbish outside the house. Later on, a body is discovered in the woods — it is that of the missing woman, only without a head. Olivia now fears that Dan is a murderer. She also believes he keeps the head in a small hat box that he brought with him. Amidst all the chaos, Hubert tries to convince Olivia to come away with him and be his wife, but she refuses.

One night, Mrs Bramson reveals to Olivia that she has hundreds of pounds locked away in a safe in the middle of the living room. Olivia warns her that it is not wise to leave a safe in plain sight, but Mrs Bramson refuses to listen. Later that night, Olivia tries again to confront Dan and he tells her about his past. She tells him why she puts up with her aunt, even saying that she wished she could kill her, to which Dan replies that she probably couldn't. The two share a brief moment of understanding.

They are interrupted by Belsize, a police officer from Scotland Yard who has come to briefly question Olivia and Dan in connection with the murder. While interviewing Dan, Belsize discovers the locked hat box. He asks Dan for the key, but Dan says it is not his. As Belsize grows more persistent and suspicious, Olivia comes in and states that the hat box is hers and puts it in her room.

Later that night, the servants get ready to go home. Olivia also says she is leaving to stay with friends in London. She tells Mrs. Bramson she is too frightened to stay in the house and warns her to get out of the house too. Mrs. Bramson again refuses to listen to her niece, thinking she is just being overexcited. As Dora and Mrs. Terrence prepare to leave, Dan decides to accompany them. Mrs. Bramson is left alone and for the first time, the audience sees that she too is terrified. Dan soon returns and gets Mrs. Bramson ready for bed.

When she drifts off to sleep, he gets a pillow and smothers her to death, although this is not explicitly shown. Dan then opens the safe and steals the money. He prepares to burn the house down, only to be interrupted by Olivia, who has come back and discovered her aunt's dead body. She tells Dan she has figured him out. Dan confesses. Just then, they see the lights of a police car coming to the house. Olivia says that the police must not get in, showing that she has fallen for Dan.

Belsize and some other officers arrest Dan. Dora and Mrs Terrence are also present. Olivia tries to implicate herself in the crime, but Dan will not let her, confessing that it was all his own work. Before he is dragged away, he looks in the mirror and talks to himself, proving he is in fact insane. Then he grabs Olivia and passionately kisses her.

== Production ==
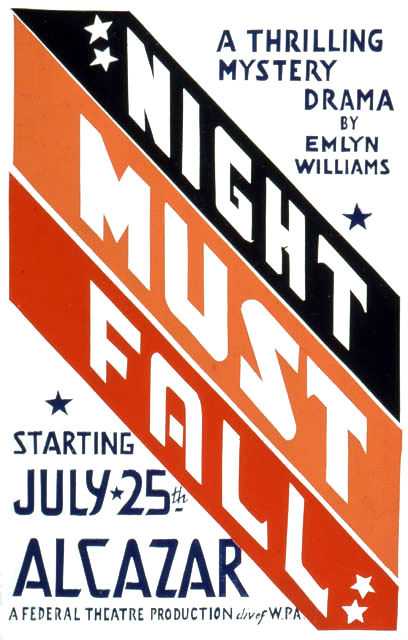
Poster for a 1938 Federal Theatre Project production of Night Must Fall at the Alcazar Theatre in San Francisco

=== London ===
Produced by Miles Malleson, the original production of Night Must Fall premiered on 31 May 1935 at the Duchess Theatre in London. The formal West End opening was preceded by a preliminary tour of Edinburgh, Newcastle upon Tyne and Glasgow. The play ran in London for 436 performances.

- Eric Stanley ... The Lord Chief Justice
- May Whitty ... Mrs. Bramson
- Angela Baddeley ... Olivia Grayne
- Basil Radford ... Hubert Laurie
- Dorothy Langley ... Nurse Libby
- Kathleen Harrison ... Mrs. Terence
- Betty Jardine ... Dora Parkoe
- Matthew Boulton ... Inspector Belsize
- Emlyn Williams ... Dan

=== New York ===
The New York production of Night Must Fall opened on Broadway on 28 September 1936, at the Ethel Barrymore Theatre. Produced by Sam H. Harris and directed by Emlyn Williams, the play ran for 64 performances.

- Ben Webster ... The Lord Chief Justice
- May Whitty ... Mrs. Bramson
- Angela Baddeley ... Olivia Grayne
- Michael Shepley ... Hubert Laurie
- Shirley Gale ... Nurse Libby
- Doris Hare ... Mrs. Terence
- Betty Jardine ... Dora Parkoe
- Matthew Boulton ... Inspector Belsize
- Emlyn Williams ... Dan

=== Revivals ===
The most recent West End revival opened at the Theatre Royal Haymarket on 14 October 1996. It starred Jason Donovan as Dan, Rosemary Leach as Mrs. Bramson and Charlotte Fryer as Olivia Grayne. It lasted barely two months amid terrible reviews, not least for Donovan's attempt at a Welsh accent.

Matthew Broderick starred as Dan in a Broadway revival which ran from 2 February to 27 June 1999 at the Lyceum Theatre and then the Helen Hayes Theatre. The cast included Judy Parfitt as Mrs. Bramson and J. Smith-Cameron as Olivia Grayne.

== Adaptations ==
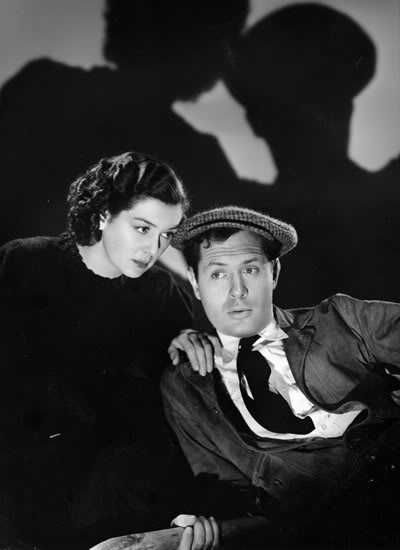
Rosalind Russell and Robert Montgomery in Night Must Fall (1937)

=== Film ===
A 1937 film adaptation using the same title was written by John Van Druten, starred Robert Montgomery, Rosalind Russell, and Dame May Whitty, and was directed by Richard Thorpe. Whitty revisited the same role from when the play was performed in London and in New York City.

A 1954 adaptation on the television anthology series Ponds Theater starred Terry Kilburn, Una O'Connor, and Evelyn Varden.

A 1964 film remake was directed by Karel Reisz from a script by Clive Exton, and starred Albert Finney, Susan Hampshire, Sheila Hancock and Mona Washbourne, but was not as successful as the original film.

=== Radio ===
A radio adaptation of Night Must Fall was presented on Philip Morris Playhouse 24 October 1941. Starring Burgess Meredith, Maureen O'Sullivan and Flora Robson, the program has not survived in radio collections.

Night Must Fall was adapted for the 24 July 1944 broadcast of The Screen Guild Theater, starring James Cagney, Rosemary DeCamp and May Whitty.

Night Must Fall was adapted for the 12 April 1946 broadcast of NBC's Mollé Mystery Theatre by Don Agger and starred Ian Martin as Dan, Virginia Field as Olivia, Ethel Browning as Mrs. Bramson, Thelma Jordan as Dora, Anthony Kemble Cooper as Hubert Laurie, and Neil Fitzgerald as Inspector Belsize.

Robert Montgomery produced, hosted and starred in a CBS Radio adaptation of Night Must Fall on Suspense 27 March 1948. May Whitty, Heather Angel, Richard Ney and Matthew Boulton co-starred.

Dame Sybil Thorndike took the part of Mrs. Bramson in a 1969 production for BBC Radio 4, directed by Betty Davies and featuring the prolific Welsh radio writer William Ingram as Dan. In 1985 BBC Radio 4 broadcast another production of the play, starring Hywel Bennett as Dan. The station re-aired the dramatisation in 1987, the year of Emlyn Williams's death.
