= New York Rubber Company =

Manufacturing company in Beacon, New York

- Industry: Rubber production
- Founded: 1858
- Founder: Charles Wolcott
- Headquarters: Beacon, New York, United States
- Key people: Henry Montgomery Sr, President

The New York Rubber Company was a company that produced rubber located in Beacon, New York. It was founded in 1858 by Charles Wolcott.

Henry Montgomery Sr., actor Robert Montgomery's father, was president of the company until 1921, when he suffered a nervous breakdown. He committed suicide the next year. The company then went into receivership, and its Beacon operations were purchased by Tucker Rubber Corporation in August 1925. It reorganized in 1927, later purchasing the Air Rubber Corporation. During World War II, the company produced rubber rafts and other equipment for the military.

A second company, Winslow Life Raft Company was founded as the New York Rubber Company in 1941.
