= Craven Street: Ben Franklin in London =

Craven Street: Ben Franklin in London is a five-part radio play dramatizing Benjamin Franklin's career as a colonial lobbyist in London before the American Revolution. It starred Elizabeth Montgomery, George Grizzard and Nigel Hawthorne. It was written, produced and directed by Yuri Rasovsky, under the aegis of Robert Foxworth's American Dialogues Foundation. Syndicated to public radio stations in 1993, it was later released as an audiobook.

== See also ==
- Benjamin Franklin House
