= Night Must Fall (1964 film) =

British thriller by Karel Reisz

- Directed by: Karel Reisz
- Written by: Emlyn Williams (play); Clive Exton
- Based on: Night Must Fall; 1935 play by Emlyn Williams
- Produced by: Albert Finney; Karel Reisz
- Starring: Albert Finney; Mona Washbourne
- Cinematography: Freddie Francis
- Edited by: Phillip Barnikel; Fergus McDonell
- Music by: Ron Grainer
- Distributed by: Metro-Goldwyn-Mayer
- Release date: 18 March 1964
- Running time: 101 minutes (US)
- Country: United Kingdom
- Language: English

Night Must Fall is a 1964 British film directed by Karel Reisz and starring Albert Finney, Mona Washbourne and Susan Hampshire. It was written by Clive Exton.

It was a remake of the 1937 film of the same name, which was in turn based on the 1935 play by Emlyn Williams.

== Plot ==
In the woods of a Welsh suburb, a man commits an axe murder and disposes of his female victim's body and the axe in a lake. The man, later shown to be a hotel bellboy named Danny, is summoned to the home of Mrs. Bramson, a wealthy widow, whose maid, Dora, is pregnant by him.

Having charmed Mrs. Bramson, he is soon living in her house and pretends to be her son, while redecorating a room and assuming butler duties. He also woos Olivia, Mrs. Bramson's daughter. Alone in his room, he looks at a hatbox, which contains the heads of his victims.

Meanwhile, the police uncover the headless body and the axe in the lake, which is bordering the property. They question Danny about the victim, who he states frequented the hotel as a prostitute. Dora discovers Danny and Olivia's relationship and rejects both of them. He begins to play odd games with Mrs. Bramson, and Olivia flees the house out of fear.

Frustrated because Mrs. Bramson grows weary of a game of chase, Danny hacks her to death. Olivia returns, sees the carnage, and summons the police. She finds Danny bathing and informs him that the police are soon to arrive. He huddles in the bathroom, withdrawn in his madness.

== Cast ==
- Albert Finney as Danny
- Mona Washbourne as Mrs. Bramson
- Susan Hampshire as Olivia
- Sheila Hancock as Dora
- Michael Medwin as Derek
- Joe Gladwin as Dodge
- Martin Wyldeck as Inspector Willett
- John Gill as Foster

== Production ==
The film was made by MGM British.

The cinematographer, Freddie Francis, said "I think it was a good film, it wasn't a very good version of Night Must Fall but as a film, and I always told Karel if they'd called it anything other than Night Must Fall it would have been successful. But if you say this is Night Must Fall everybody remembers Night Must Fall, the head in the hat box and blah blah blah. and this had none of that element in it. It was too much a study of this Strange boy, which was fine but not when people are waiting for the hatbox bit."

== Release ==
The film was entered into the 14th Berlin International Film Festival.

== Critical reception ==
The Monthly Film Bulletin wrote: "The opening shots with the girl on the swing, the sunlit trees, the darker recesses of the forest, the crescendo of alarm signals on the soundtrack, and the psychopath, stripped to the waist, hacking away at his victim in the undergrowth, give a very fair indication of the sort of film that this is going to be: not so much a thriller as a typically humourless example of that overworked genre known as psychological drama. ... Perhaps the most depressing thing about the film, however, is that nowhere can one spot the director's reason for making it. Sad to reflect that Karel Reisz has taken over three years to follow up the success of Saturday Night and Sunday Morning with something as flawed as this." However, Paul Mavis, reviewing the Warner Archive DVD release for Movies & Drinks, wrote, "Taking Emlyn Williams’s old chestnut and transforming it into a startlingly off-putting psychological shocker, director Karl Reisz’s and Albert Finney’s “Angry Young Psychopath” Night Must Fall has more on its mind than the non-existent gore that some critics insisted was there, making the charmingly jumped-up killer terrifyingly opaque…while dissecting the all-too-readable victims. It’s an intense, sustained vision of inexplicable, murderous frustration."
