= Night Must Fall (1937 film) =

1937 film by Richard Thorpe

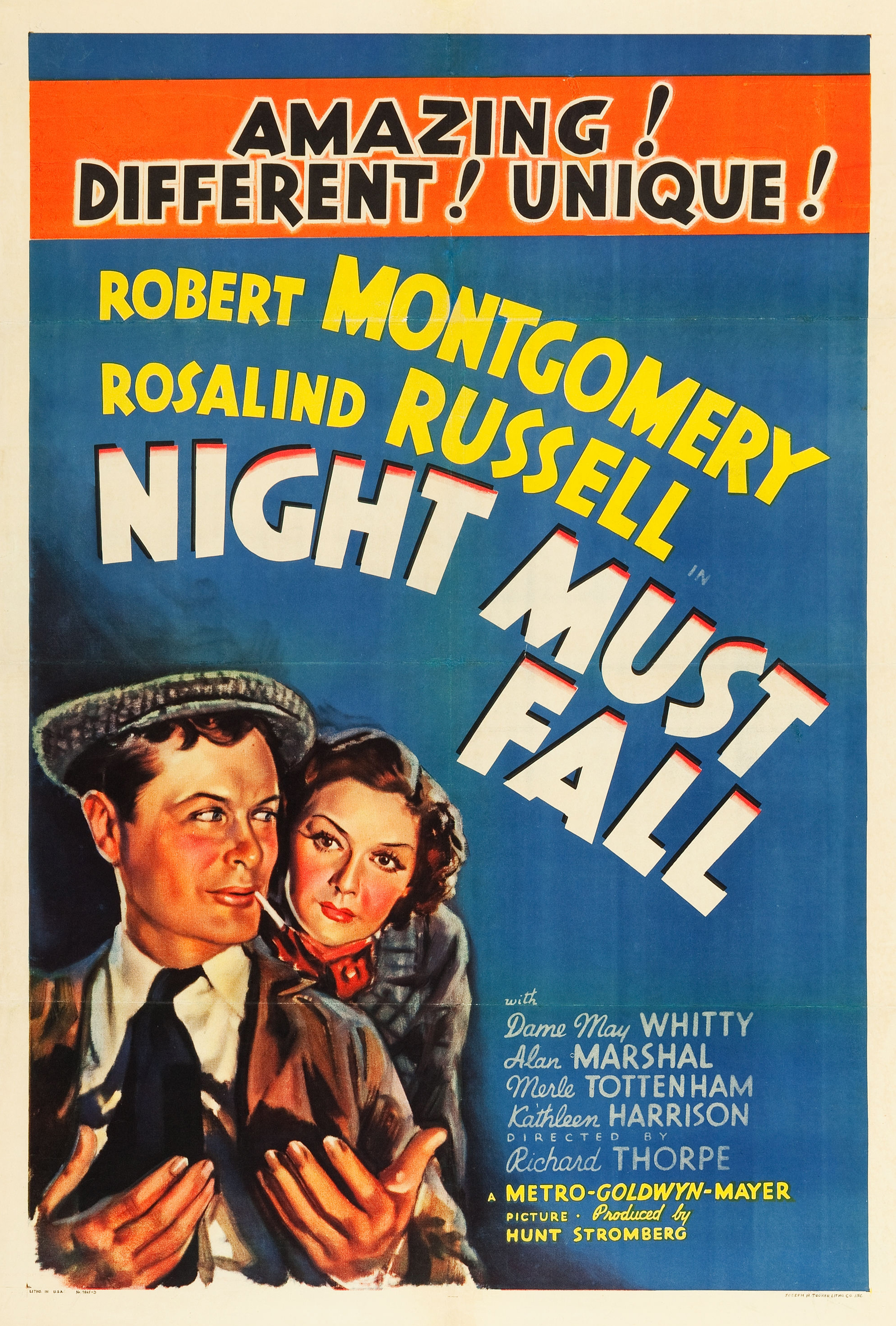
- Theatrical release poster
- Directed by: Richard Thorpe
- Screenplay by: John Van Druten
- Based on: Night Must Fall by Emlyn Williams
- Produced by: Hunt Stromberg
- Starring: Robert Montgomery; Rosalind Russell; Dame May Whitty
- Cinematography: Ray June
- Edited by: Robert Kern
- Music by: Edward Ward
- Production company: Metro-Goldwyn-Mayer
- Distributed by: Loew's Inc.
- Release date: April 29, 1937 (New York)
- Running time: 116 minutes
- Country: United States
- Language: English
- Budget: $589,000 (est.)
- Box office: $1,015,000 (worldwide est.)

Night Must Fall is a 1937 American film directed by Richard Thorpe and starring Robert Montgomery, Rosalind Russell and May Whitty. The film was adapted by John Van Druten from the 1935 Emlyn Williams play of the same title.

The film marks Whitty's Hollywood film debut at age 72, reprising her role in the stage drama in London and on Broadway. She earned an Academy Award nomination for Best Supporting Actress. Robert Montgomery also received an Oscar nomination for Best Actor in a Leading Role.

A critical success, Night Must Fall was named the best film of the year by the National Board of Review. A 1964 remake starring Albert Finney failed to reach the level of success of the original film.

== Plot ==
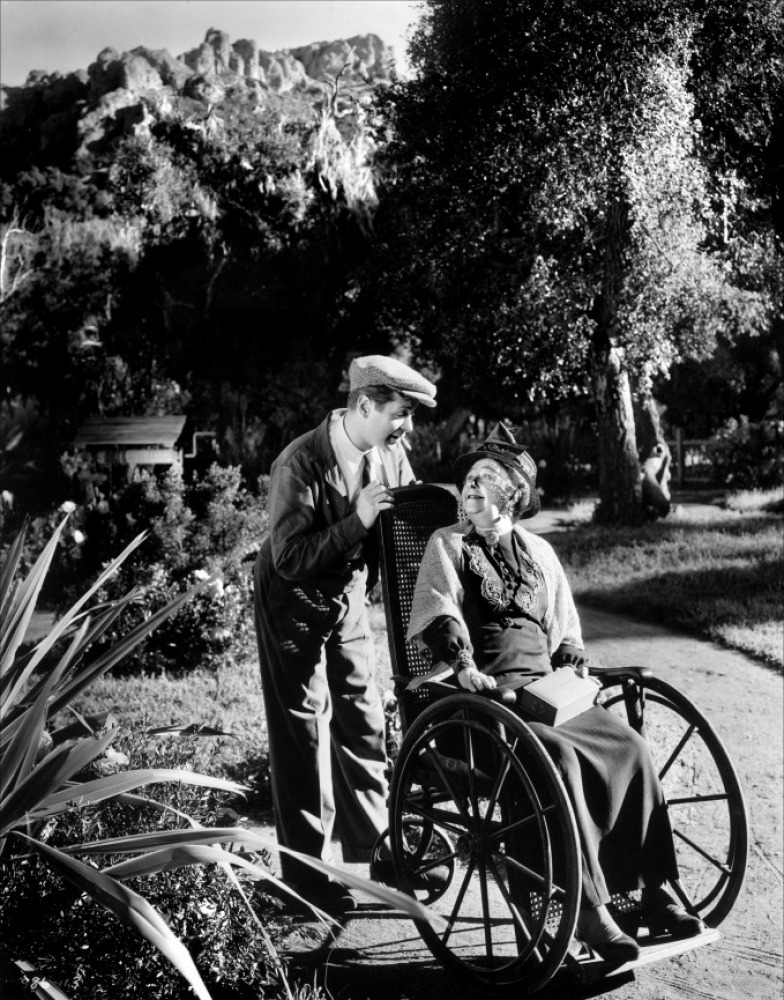
Robert Montgomery and Dame May Whitty in Night Must Fall

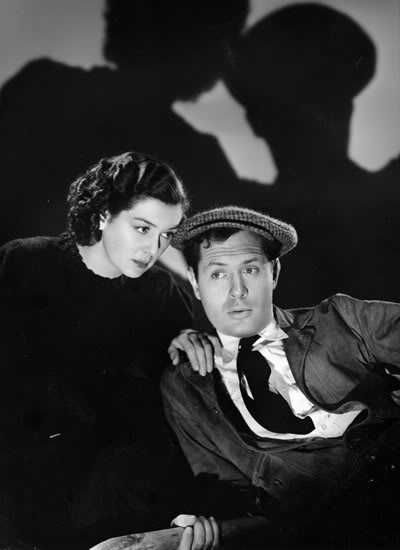
Rosalind Russell and Robert Montgomery in Night Must Fall

Police drag the river and search the surrounding countryside in a small English village for the body of Mrs. Shellbrook, a hotel guest who has been missing for days. The authorities question the townsfolk, including those living in the home of the elderly Mrs. Bramson who pretends to need a wheelchair and threatens to fire her maid Dora for allegedly stealing a chicken and breaking china. Dora distracts Mrs. Bramson by mentioning her boyfriend, Danny, who works at the hotel. Danny visits Dora, who asks Mrs. Bramson to speak with him.

Perceiving that Mrs. Bramson is a hypochondriac who only pretends to need a wheelchair, Danny treats her with kindness and claims that she reminds him of his mother. He tells Mrs. Bramson that he loves Dora and would marry her if he had a better job, so Mrs. Bramson offers him a position as her servant.

Mrs. Bramson's niece and companion Olivia Grayne is suspicious of Danny, but Mrs. Bramson dismisses her concerns. When Mrs. Bramson's attorney Justin Laurie arrives to give his client money, he warns her to avoid holding so much cash but she ignores him. Arriving with his belongings, Danny sees Mrs. Bramson placing cash in her safe but pretends not to notice. Justin asks Olivia to marry him, but she refuses because their relationship lacks any true romance. Justin leaves, feeling dejected. Olivia later catches Danny lying to Mrs. Bramson about a shawl that allegedly belonged to his mother, as Olivia notices the price tag still attached to it. Even so, she removes the tag so that Mrs. Bramson does not become aware of it. Olivia, annoyed by Danny at first, becomes attracted to him as he challenges and compliments her.

Dora discovers Mrs. Shellbrook's decapitated body in the forest but her head is missing. Olivia accuses Danny of the murder but he denies it. Mrs. Bramson dismisses her niece's concerns, as she has grown fond of Danny. Olivia visits Justin and tells him she is afraid, so he invites her to stay with him and his mother. Olivia first accepts his offer but later declines, saying that she is silly for being so fearful.

During the week, locals tour the crime scene. As her house is nearby, Mrs. Bramson becomes a local celebrity and basks in the attention, to Olivia's disgust. A detective questions Danny and searches his room, causing him to become fearful. Feeling sympathetic toward Danny, Olivia helps him deceive the detective. The other residents are uncomfortable living in the house while a killer is at large but Mrs. Bramson feels safe, ironically, because of Danny.

The following night, Olivia leaves, afraid of Danny. She warns Mrs. Bramson not to spend another night there. Mrs. Bramson dismisses Olivia's concern, declaring that Danny will protect her. Two other servant girls leave for the evening as well. Realizing she is alone, Mrs. Bramson hears noises and becomes frightened. She screams for Danny, who calms her and tries to lull her to sleep. Danny then suffocates her and empties the safe.

Olivia returns just as Danny is about to pour kerosene all over the house and set it ablaze. She tells Danny that she has returned to prove that she was right about him, realizing he has murdered her aunt. Danny tells her about his childhood and how he resents how others view him as a servant, stating that he is seizing his chance. He says that he must also kill her so no one can incriminate him in Mrs. Bramson's murder. Olivia replies that she understands that he will kill her but she wants him to know that she is no longer attracted to him and now sees him for who he really is, a cold-blooded killer. As Danny approaches Olivia, Justin arrives with the police, whom he had summoned when he could not reach Olivia by phone. The police arrest Danny for murder while Justin and Olivia embrace.

== Cast ==
- Robert Montgomery as Danny
- Rosalind Russell as Olivia
- May Whitty as Mrs. Bramson
- Alan Marshal as Justin Laurie
- Merle Tottenham as Dora
- Kathleen Harrison as Mrs. Terence
- Eily Malyon as Nurse
- Matthew Boulton as Belsize
- Beryl Mercer as Saleslady
- Winifred Harris as Mrs. Laurie
- E. E. Clive as Guide

== Production ==
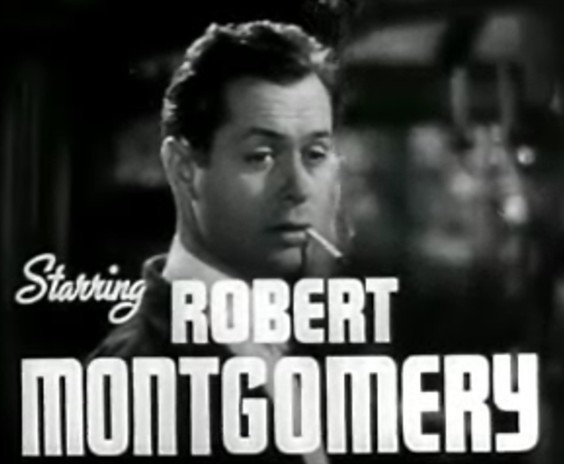
Montgomery in the trailer

Dame May Whitty, Kathleen Harrison, Merle Tuttenham, and Matthew Boulton reprised the roles that they had originated in the London production. Whitty and Boulton also appeared in the later Broadway production.

Montgomery recounted that he had seen the play in New York and lobbied Louis B. Mayer for the role. The studio was willing to risk a flop in order to seize control over Montgomery and his desire for more substantial roles. He recalled that "they okayed my playing in it because they thought the fan reaction to me, in such a role, would humiliate me." Montgomery also agreed to finance a portion of the film.

== Release ==
Louis B. Mayer supervised the production of the film's theatrical trailer, which warned audiences of the film's "experimental nature".

== Reception ==
In a contemporary review for The New York Times, critic Frank S. Nugent called the film "a sober, evenly modulated and definitely ... unusual melodrama, sentiently directed and remarkably well-played" and wrote: "You may not like the picture—I am sure the Montgomery Fan Clubs will be horrified—but I think you will find it different and interesting."

Reviewer Kate Cameron of the New York Daily News called the film "dramatic, loaded with high-tension thrills ... an improvement on the stage production" and wrote that Montgomery's performance elevated him "into an eminent position among the top-notchers of Hollywood players."

Writing for Night and Day in 1937, Graham Greene offered a negative review, describing the film as a "pretentious little murder play ... a long dim film". Greene characterized the film as "like an early talky ... no more than a photographed stage play".

The film grossed a total of $1,015,000, with $550,000 in receipts from the U.S. and Canada and $465,000 from elsewhere. It earned a profit of $40,000.

== Awards ==
Night Must Fall was named the best film of 1937 by the National Board of Review.

Montgomery was nominated for the Academy Award for Best Actor and Whitty for Best Supporting Actress.

== Home media ==
The Warner Archive Collection released Night Must Fall on DVD on December 14, 2010.

== Adaptations ==
A radio adaptation of Night Must Fall was presented on Philip Morris Playhouse on October 24, 1941. Starring Burgess Meredith, Maureen O'Sullivan and Flora Robson, the program has not survived in radio collections.

Night Must Fall was adapted for the July 24, 1944 broadcast of The Screen Guild Theater, starring Whitty, James Cagney, and Rosemary DeCamp.

Montgomery produced, hosted and starred in a CBS Radio adaptation of Night Must Fall on Suspense on March 27, 1948. Whitty, Heather Angel, Richard Ney and Matthew Boulton costarred.

A remake, also entitled Night Must Fall, was released in 1964, starring Albert Finney.
