= The Legend of Lizzie Borden =

1975 American television film

- Genre: Historical drama; mystery; horror
- Written by: William Bast
- Directed by: Paul Wendkos
- Starring: Elizabeth Montgomery; Katherine Helmond; Ed Flanders; Fionnula Flanagan; Fritz Weaver; Amzie Strickland; Hayden Rorke
- Music by: Billy Goldenberg
- Country of origin: United States
- Original language: English

Production
- Producer: George LeMaire
- Cinematography: Robert Hauser
- Editor: John A. Martinelli
- Running time: 96 minutes
- Production companies: Paramount Television; George LeMaire Productions

Original release
- Network: ABC
- Release: February 10, 1975

The Legend of Lizzie Borden is a 1975 American historical mystery television film directed by Paul Wendkos and starring Elizabeth Montgomery—in an Emmy-nominated performance—as Lizzie Borden, an American woman who was accused of murdering her father and stepmother in 1892. It co-stars Katherine Helmond, Fritz Weaver, Fionnula Flanagan, and Hayden Rorke. It premiered on ABC on February 10, 1975. The film was nominated for a Golden Globe award for Best Motion Picture Made for Television in 1976.

Although the film is based on fact, it is a stylized retelling of the events of August 4, 1892, the day the father and step-mother of New England spinster Lizzie Borden were found brutally murdered in their Fall River, Massachusetts home. Public interest in Borden and the murders is exacerbated by her aloof demeanor after the murders, and the public speculates about her involvement in them when she fails to express any emotion during her father and stepmother's funerals.

The subsequent incarceration of the prime suspect (Lizzie herself) as well as the coroner's inquest and the trial are faithfully depicted, using actual testimony. During the trial, various persons testify, including Bridget Sullivan, the Borden's maid from Ireland who was the only other person in the home at the time of the murders.

In what may be seen as a deviation from the film's docudrama narrative, as Lizzie hears her verdict, flashbacks are shown of her actually committing the murders in the nude and bathing after each death, explaining why no blood was ever found on her or her clothes; however, the film's plot with regard to Lizzie's role in the murders remains ambiguous because it does not state that Lizzie was actually reminiscing about the crimes nor does it state that she was simply fantasizing about how she herself would have disposed of her victims. When Lizzie returns home after her acquittal, her sister Emma asks her point-blank if she killed their father; Lizzie does not answer. The epilogue states that the killings of Andrew and Abby Borden remain unsolved.

== Plot ==
On August 4, 1892, Bridget Sullivan, the maid, summons neighbor Mrs. Churchill to the Borden residence, where Lizzie Borden meets her at the door coldly stating, "Mrs. Churchill, do come in, someone has killed father." Andrew Borden's body reclines on the living room sofa with multiple hatchet wounds across his face. Police arrive to examine Andrew's body, and upon searching the house, Mrs. Churchill and Bridget find the body of Abby Borden, Lizzie's stepmother, hacked to death in the guest room. Neighbors flock to surround the house. Emma Borden, 9 years older than 31-year-old Lizzie, returns from Fairhaven, where she was away staying with friends. Emma directly asks Lizzie if she killed father, which Lizzie denies. Lizzie is given morphine to sedate her and answers police questions inconsistently.

At the funeral Lizzie is criticized for not wearing black or showing grief. Lizzie is informed that she is a suspect, and an inquest is held.

At the inquest Bridget says she and Lizzie were the only ones in the house, besides the victims, the day of the murder. Mr. Borden left for downtown, and Mrs. Borden received a note—that nobody ever saw—asking Abby to care for an unnamed sick friend. As instructed by Mrs. Borden, Bridget was outside the house, with the doors locked, washing windows at the time of the murders. Bridget did not see anyone come to the house until Mr. Borden came home at about 10:45 and took a nap on the sofa. Bridget lay down for a nap as the city hall clock struck 11 o'clock, but 3 or 4 minutes later Lizzie called out after discovering Andrew's body.

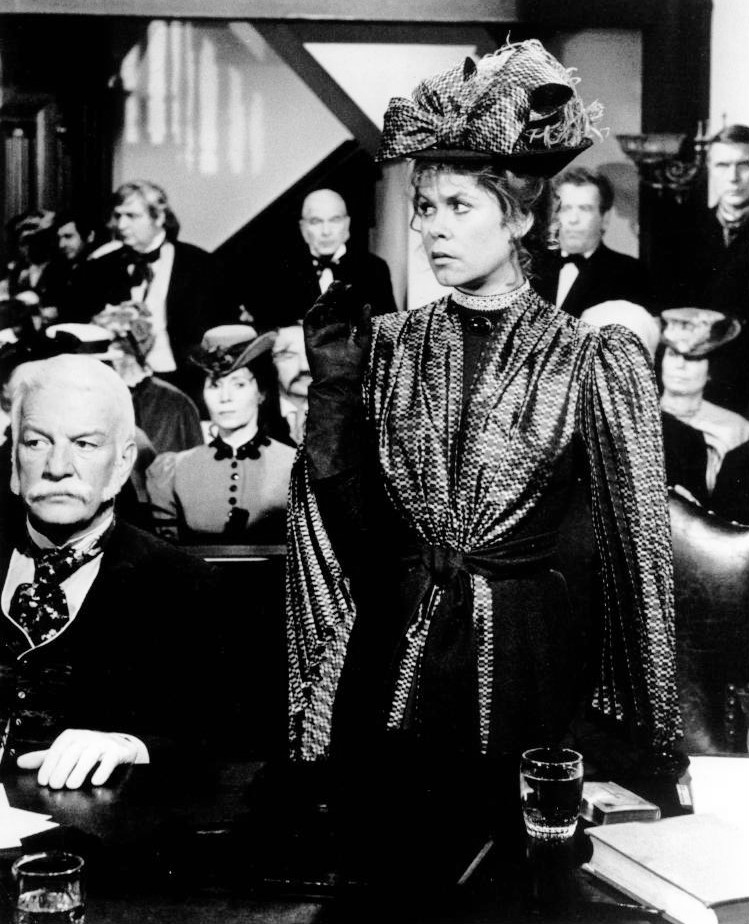
Lizzie listens as her trial verdict is announced.

Lizzie testifies that she called her stepmother Abby "mother" when she was a child but began to call her "Mrs. Borden" later, without explaining why. Lizzie changed her story several times, unsure whether she was upstairs or downstairs when her father came home. She claimed to have last seen Abby 1 hour and 30 minutes before her body was discovered. Nobody saw the note to Abby or saw her return home. Andrew was in the house 15 to 20 minutes while Lizzie was in the barn looking for an iron sinker for her fishing line for a trip the following Monday. Lizzie cannot explain how someone unknown killed Abby an hour and half before, while both Bridget and Lizzie were around, then killed Andrew during the 20 minutes or so that she was in the barn and Bridget was preparing to nap. The magistrate judges Lizzie probably guilty and orders Lizzie committed to await trial.

Lizzie faces death by hanging. With Emma's support and her share of her father's $250,000 estate, Lizzie retains a "dream team," headed by George Robinson, former governor of Massachusetts. She decorates her prison cell with furniture and selects a special wardrobe for the trial. The press and public are sympathetic to Lizzie, a Sunday school teacher and a devoted worker for temperance, Christian aid, and foreign missions.

Lizzie's testimony at the inquest is deemed inadmissible, as she was denied proper counsel and her testimony was taken when she was under the influence of morphine.

At the trial, friend Alice Russell testifies that the evening before the murder Lizzie said her father was having trouble with business associates, was afraid someone would harm him, and the house had been broken into in broad daylight when family members were at home. The day after the funeral, Lizzie burned a dress in the stove that supposedly was stained by paint.

The local chemist testifies that Lizzie attempted to purchase prussic acid a few days before the murders, ostensibly to clean a sealskin cape. He would not sell her the poison without a prescription.

A forensic expert testifies that the broken hatchet found by police matches wounds on Mr. Borden's skull. The assailant's clothing would be splattered in blood, yet Lizzie had no bloodstains on her just moments after the last murder, except for a small amount of menstrual blood on her clothes. When Andrew's and Abby's skulls are produced in court and a hatchet is fit into the wound, Lizzie faints.

The foreman of the all-male jury is asked to announce the verdict. In flashbacks, Lizzie recalls the sequence of events leading up to the murder. Abby persuades Andrew to change his will, and Andrew agrees to see his lawyer next week. Lizzie says to Emma that she would see Abby dead first and that her father must not make a new will. Emma decides to go to Fairhaven the next day. Lizzie then flashes to Bridget washing windows then chatting with a neighbor. Locking the doors, Lizzie strips off her clothes, taking a hatchet from under her mattress. Nude, Lizzie sneaks up behind Abby and Andrew in turn, hacking each to death. Between both murders, Lizzie washes up in the basement and dresses again in unsullied clothes. She dumps the hatchet in the latrine. The foreman announces a "not guilty" verdict. Lizzie is ordered released. The crowd outside the courtroom celebrates.

At home, Emma welcomes Lizzie doubtfully, asking her, "once more, then I shall never mention it again as long as I live. Did you kill father?" Lizzie's face remains expressionless, and she does not respond.

Months after her acquittal Lizzie moved into a mansion in the fashionable section of Fall River, where she lived until she died in 1927, at the age of 66. Emma died nine days after Lizzie. To this day the case remains unsolved.

== Cast ==
- Elizabeth Montgomery as Lizzie Borden
- Fionnula Flanagan as Bridget Sullivan
- Ed Flanders as Hosea Knowlton
- Katherine Helmond as Emma Borden
- Don Porter as George Robinson
- Fritz Weaver as Andrew Borden
- Bonnie Bartlett as Sylvia Knowlton
- John Beal as Dr. Bowen
- Helen Craig as Abby Borden
- Alan Hewitt as Mayor Coughlin
- Gail Kobe as Alice Russell
- Hayden Rorke as Julien Ralph
- Amzie Strickland as Adelaide Churchill
- Robert Symonds as Andrew Jennings

== Production ==
=== Casting ===
Elizabeth Montgomery and Lizzie Borden were sixth cousins once removed, both descending from 17th-century Massachusetts resident John Luther.

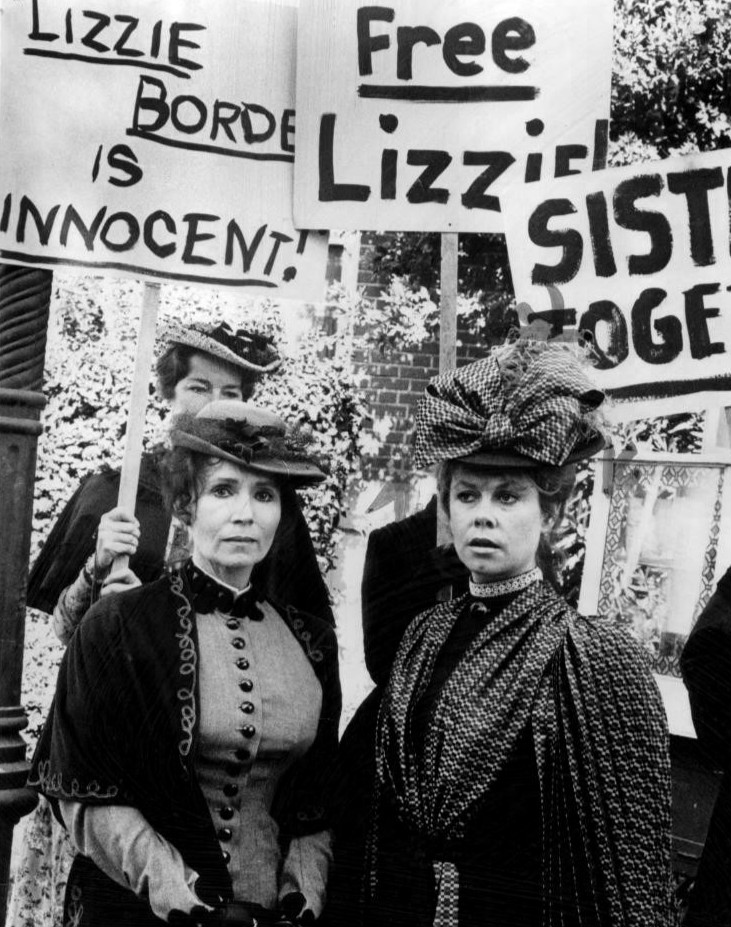
Katherine Helmond as Emma Borden and Elizabeth Montgomery as Lizzie Borden

Rhonda McClure, the genealogist who documented the Montgomery-Borden connection, said, "I wonder how Elizabeth would have felt if she knew she was playing her own cousin." One of the gowns which was worn by Montgomery in the film is on display at the bed-and-breakfast which now occupies the Borden house.

Irish actress Fionnula Flanagan was cast in the part of the Borden's maid, Bridget Sullivan, who was originally from Ireland.

== Reception ==
=== Awards ===
The film won writer William Bast the 1975 Edgar Award for Best TV Feature/Miniseries. It also won two Emmy Awards, for Costume Design (presented to Guy C. Verhille) and Film Editing (John A. Martinelli), and received nominations in three other Emmy categories: Lead Actress (Montgomery), Art Direction (Jack De Shields), and Sound Editing (Harry Gordon).

The film was also nominated for Best Motion Picture Made for Television in the 1976 Golden Globe Awards.

== European version ==
The European theatrical version is more explicit than the theatrical version which was broadcast on ABC, showing Borden nude in the scenes when she kills her father and stepmother. This version also runs an extra 4 minutes, 104 minutes total versus the United States version of 100 minutes.

== Release ==
A Region 1 DVD release of the film was released on October 7, 2014.
