= Martha-Bryan Allen =

American 1920s stage actress

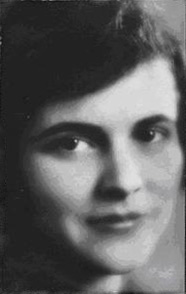
- NYPL Digital Collection
- Born: April 30, 1903; Louisville, Kentucky, U.S.
- Died: July 29, 1985 (aged 82); Patterson, New York, U.S.
- Occupation: Stage actress
- Spouse(s): Lewis Arthur Cushman, Jr. (m. 1926)
- Children: 2
- Relatives: Elizabeth Bryan Allen (sister); Elizabeth Montgomery (niece)
- Writing career
- Years active: 1922–1926

Martha-Bryan Allen (April 30, 1903 – July 29, 1985) was an American stage actress, active during the 1920s.

== Life and career ==
Martha-Bryan Allen (also known as Martha Bryan-Allen), was born on April 30, 1903, to Bryan H. and Rebecca D. Allen of Louisville, Kentucky. Her father was the treasurer of a local electric company. Allen's sister Elizabeth, also an actress, was the first wife of film star Robert Montgomery and the mother of Bewitched's Elizabeth Montgomery.

Allen attended classes at the American Academy of Dramatic Arts in New York City before making her Broadway debut on January 9, 1922, playing Angelica in Leonid Andreyev's He Who Gets Slapped. Two months later she played the envoy's daughter in Bernard Shaw's Back to Methuselah, and following year, Essie in another Bernard Shaw production, The Devil's Disciple. She played Lucy Blake in Gypsy Jim, a three-act play by Oscar Hammerstein and Milton Herbert Gropper, Appolonia Lee in Sophie Treadwell's O, Nightingale, and Myrtle Carey in The Carolinian by Rafael Sabatini and J. Harold Terry. In 1925 Allen was chosen to play the title role in John B. Hymer and Le Roy Clemens' Aloma of the South Seas, but was replaced by Vivienne Osborne shortly before the play's New York debut. By the year's end she would find success playing the circus entertainer Dora in René Fauchois' hit play, The Monkey Talks.

Shortly after her marriage in 1926 to Lewis Arthur Cushman Jr., Allen chose to retire from the stage. Cushman was the founder of the American Bakeries Company, whose genesis was Cushman Bakeries, a company started by his father.

Allen died on July 29, 1985, at her residence in Patterson, New York. She was survived by her daughter and was preceded in death by her husband and a son.
