= A Case of Rape =

- Elizabeth Montgomery in court
- Genre: Drama
- Written by: Louis Rudolph; Robert E. Thompson
- Directed by: Boris Sagal
- Starring: Elizabeth Montgomery; Ronny Cox; William Daniels
- Theme music composer: Hal Mooney
- Country of origin: United States
- Original language: English

Production
- Executive producer: David Levinson
- Producer: Louis Rudolph
- Production locations: Universal Studios - 100 Universal City Plaza, Universal City, California
- Cinematography: Terry K. Meade
- Editor: Richard Bracken
- Running time: 100 minutes
- Production company: Universal Television

Original release
- Network: NBC
- Release: February 20, 1974

A Case of Rape is a 1974 American made-for-television drama film directed by Boris Sagal and starring Elizabeth Montgomery, Ronny Cox, and William Daniels. It premiered on NBC on February 20, 1974. The film tells the story of a wife and mother who is raped twice by the same man and her ordeals dealing with the rape, the police and the trial.

== Plot ==
Ellen Harrod appears to have a happy marriage to David, although his frequent work-related absences are beginning to take a toll on her. While taking night school classes with her neighbor and best friend, Marge Bracken, she is introduced to Larry Retzliff.

Ellen and Marge accept a ride home from Retzliff the same night while David is away. Once Ellen is in her apartment, Retzliff arrives claiming car trouble and asks to use the phone. When Ellen lets him in, he overpowers and rapes her. Unable to reach David by phone, and emotionally unable to report the crime, Ellen decides to put the attack behind her.

When David returns, she is still unable to get his attention long enough to tell him about the attack. Having passed an anonymous blood test, Ellen resolves to resume her life. Four days later, Retzliff stalks Ellen in a parking garage and rapes her again, this time beating her viciously.

Ellen reports the second attack but the police, doctors, and detectives treat here without sympathy. The District Attorney, Leonard Alexander, appears to have her best interests at heart, but clearly has reservations. Retzliff is defended by ruthless attorney Muriel Dyer who bullies Ellen on the stand. His tactics succeed in getting Retzliff found not guilty. Following the trial, attorney Alexander comments, "Never try a rape case unless your victim is a 90-year-old nun with at least four stab wounds." Retzliff mockingly apologizes to Ellen, saying "no hard feelings", but Ellen coldly threatens to kill him if he comes near her again.

Voiceover narration reveals that Retzliff attempted to rape someone else shortly after the trial. He was shot and wounded by police, pled guilty to the rape and was sentenced to time in prison. Ellen and David's marriage didn't survive the strain of the events of the film, and Ellen filed for divorce.

== Cast ==
- Elizabeth Montgomery as Ellen Harrod
- Ronny Cox as David Harrod
- Debbie Lytton as Kim Harrod
- William Daniels as Leonard Alexander
- Cliff Potts as Larry Retzliff
- Rosemary Murphy as Muriel Dyer
- Patricia Smith as Marge Bracken
- Ken Swofford as Det. Riley
- Jonathan Lippe as Det. Parker
- Sandy Kenyon as Mike Bracken
- Alex Henteloff as Alex
- Robert Karnes as Judge
- Mario Gallo as Photographer
- Antony Carbone as Officer Carbone
- Davis Roberts as Officer Kane
- Tom Selleck as Stan

== Broadcast ==
The film was broadcast on February 20, 1974, on NBC, which had some reservations about showing the second rape scene, which was considered strongly graphic at the time. During the airing of this movie, NBC put a disclaimer and voiceover artist reads as follows, "'A Case of Rape' treats a sensitive subject in a mature and forthright manner, although that subject is one of growing public concern and importance. We suggest you consider whether the program should be viewed by young people or others in your family who might be disturbed by it." As reported by the A&E series Biography, Montgomery believed so strongly in the story that she threatened to leave the project if the scene was cut. Montgomery prevailed, and the film was shown in its entirety along with warnings of the mature subject matter.

This was the second issue-oriented TV-movie of its time, following the 1973 CBS TV movie Cry Rape, starring Andrea Marcovicci, and helped to change human rights and legislation for rape victims. It was NBC's highest rated TV movie in history with a Nielsen rating of 33.1 and an audience share of 49%.

== Awards ==
Montgomery, who had become a household name during her eight-year tenure on Bewitched, received an Emmy nomination for her performance.
