= The Panama Deception =

- Directed by: Barbara Trent
- Written by: David Kaspar
- Narrated by: Elizabeth Montgomery
- Cinematography: Manuel Becker; Michael Dobo
- Music by: Chuck Wild
- Production company: Empowerment Project
- Distributed by: Empowerment Project
- Release date: July 31, 1992
- Running time: 91 minutes
- Country: United States
- Language: English

The Panama Deception is a 1992 American documentary film, critical of the 1989 United States invasion of Panama.

The film was directed by Barbara Trent, written and edited by David Kasper, and narrated by actress Elizabeth Montgomery. It was a production of the Empowerment Project, and won the 1992 Academy Award for Best Documentary Feature.

== Summary ==
The film recounts the events which led to the invasion, the death and destruction caused by the invasion, and the aftermath. The film is critical of the actions of the United States Armed Forces. It also highlights the media bias within the United States, showing events that were unreported or systematically misreported, including downplaying of the number of civilian casualties. The film also argued that the true purpose of the invasion was to prevent the then-scheduled retrocession of the Panama Canal Zone to Panama as agreed in the Torrijos–Carter Treaties, rather than the stated justification of removing Manuel Noriega from power due to his indictment in U.S. courts on racketeering and drugs trafficking charges. Panama ultimately gained full control over the Canal Zone on December 31, 1999, fulfilling the terms of the Torrijos-Carter agreements.

The film states that the U.S. government invaded Panama in order to destroy the PDF, the Panama Defense Forces, which were perceived as a threat to U.S. control over Panama, and install a government which would be friendly to U.S. interests. The film includes footage of what are claimed to be mass graves uncovered after the American troops had withdrawn and footage of burned-down neighborhoods, refers to the alleged use of experimental weapons, including supposed secret laser or beam type weapons, and presents depictions of some of the 20,000 refugees who fled the fighting.

== Production ==
The documentary was completed on a $300,000 budget provided by funding from Channel 4, Rhino Entertainment, J. Roderick MacArthur Foundation, the Rex Foundation, the Peace Development Fund, the National Council of Churches, the Vietnam Veterans of America Foundation, the Vanguard Public Foundation, Michael Moore, and other donors.

The film was banned in Panama, and in the United States the Public Broadcasting Service banned it from being broadcast. Several individual PBS member stations such as WNYC-TV, WGBH-TV, and KQED-TV defied the ban to broadcast it anyway.

== Reception ==
On the review aggregator website Rotten Tomatoes, 100% of 5 critics' reviews are positive.

== See also ==
- Politico-media complex
