= Robert Montgomery (actor) =

American actor (1904–1981)

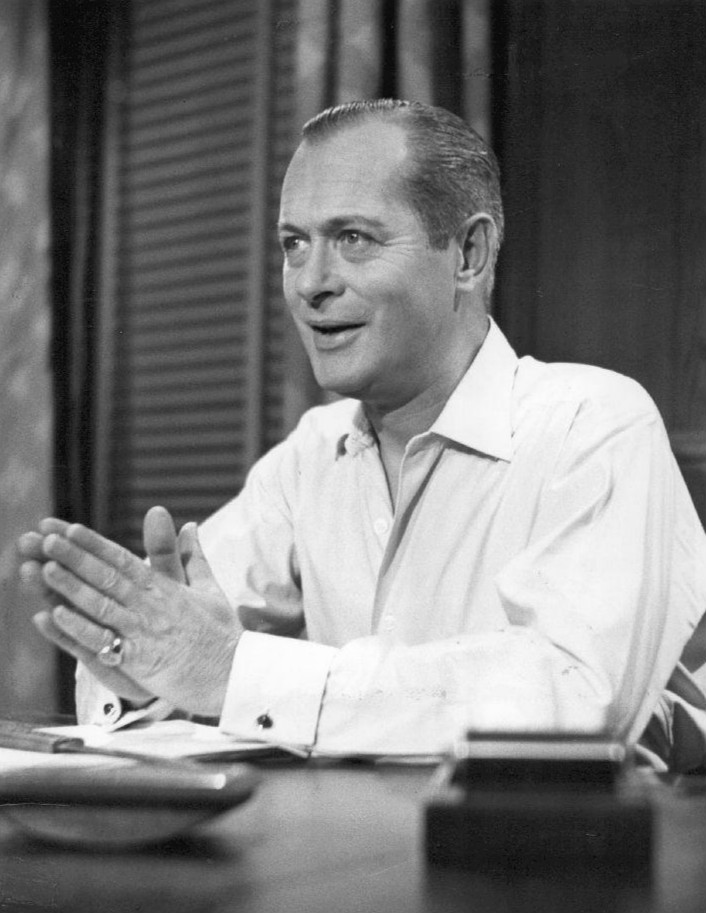
- Montgomery c. 1950s
- Born: Henry Montgomery Jr. May 21, 1904; Beacon, New York, U.S.
- Died: September 27, 1981 (aged 77); New York City, U.S.
- Occupations: Actor; director; producer
- Years active: 1924–1960
- Spouses: Elizabeth Bryan Allen (m. 1928; div. 1950) Elizabeth Grant Harkness (m. 1950)
- Children: 3, including Elizabeth

President of the Screen Actors Guild
- In office 1935–1938
- Preceded by: Eddie Cantor
- Succeeded by: Ralph Morgan
- In office 1946–1947
- Preceded by: George Murphy
- Succeeded by: Ronald Reagan

Military service
- Branch/service: United States Navy
- Years of service: 1941–1946
- Rank: Lieutenant commander
- Unit: USS Barton (DD-722)
- Battles/wars: World War II; Battle of Normandy
- Awards: Bronze Star Medal w/ Combat V Combat Action Ribbon; American Defense Service Medal; American Campaign Medal; European–African–Middle Eastern Campaign Medal with two stars Asiatic–Pacific Campaign Medal with two stars World War II Victory Medal

Robert Montgomery (/mɒntˈɡʌməri/; born Henry Montgomery Jr.; May 21, 1904 – September 27, 1981) was an American actor, director, and producer. He began his acting career on the stage, but was soon hired by Metro-Goldwyn-Mayer (MGM). Initially assigned roles in comedies, he soon proved he was able to handle dramatic ones, as well. He appeared in a wide variety of roles, such as the weak-willed prisoner Kent in The Big House (1930), the psychotic Danny in Night Must Fall (1937), and Joe, the boxer mistakenly sent to Heaven in Here Comes Mr. Jordan (1941). The last two earned him nominations for the Academy Award for Best Actor.

During World War II, he drove ambulances in France until the Dunkirk evacuation. When the United States entered the war on December 8, 1941, he enlisted in the Navy, and was present at the invasion at Normandy. After the war, he returned to Hollywood, where he worked in both films, and later, in television. He was also the father of actress Elizabeth Montgomery.

== Early life ==
Henry Montgomery, Jr., was born in Fishkill Landing, New York (now Beacon, New York), to Henry Montgomery and his wife, Mary Weed Montgomery (née Barney), and was of Scottish and Scots-Irish heritage. His father was president of the New York Rubber Company, and jumped to his death off the Brooklyn Bridge in 1922.

== Career ==
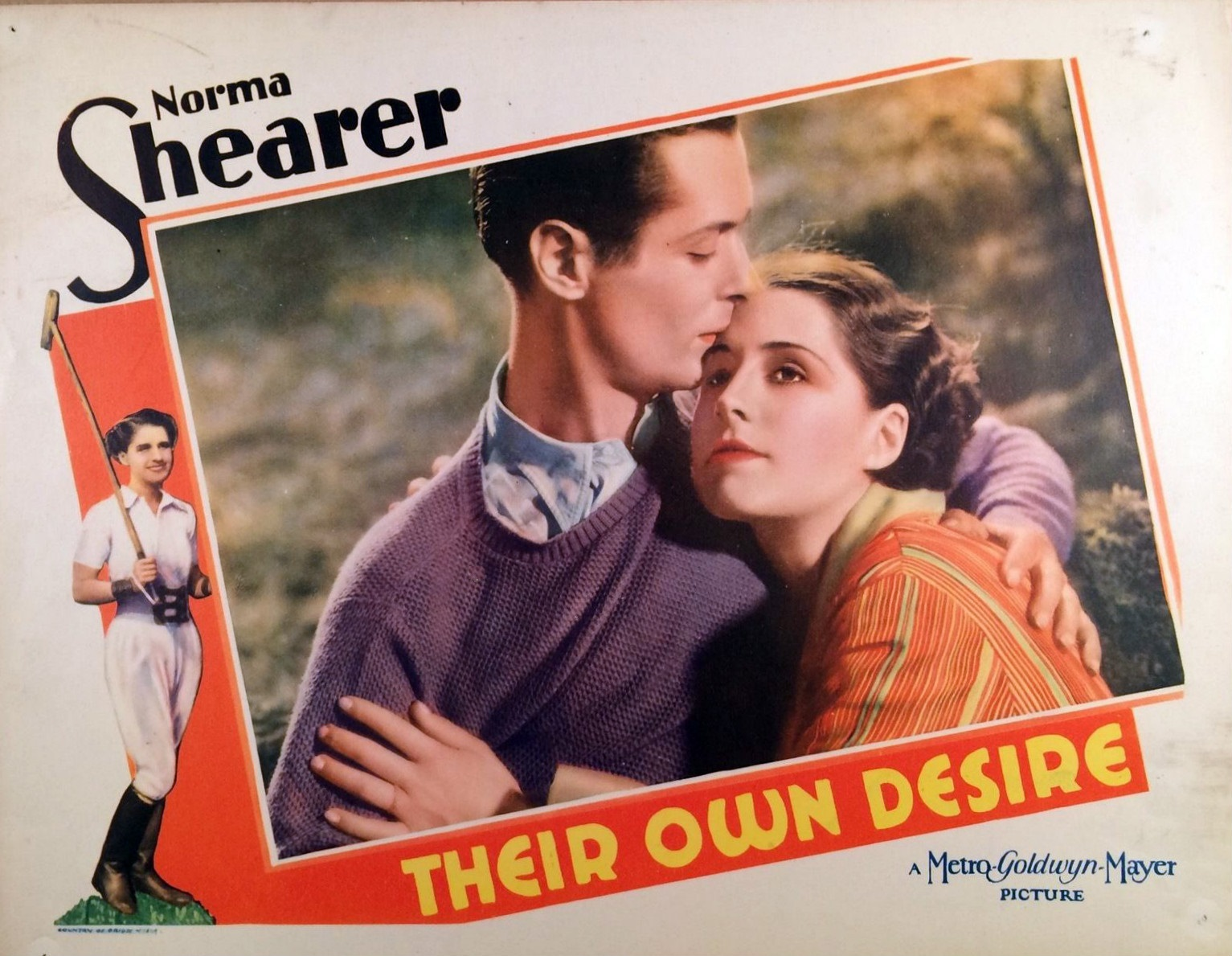
Lobby card for Their Own Desire (1929)

Montgomery settled in New York City to try his hand at writing and acting. He established a stage career, and became popular enough to turn down an offer to appear opposite Vilma Bánky in the film This Is Heaven (1929). Sharing a stage with George Cukor gave him an entry to Hollywood and a contract with Metro-Goldwyn-Mayer, where he debuted in So This Is College (also 1929). One writer claimed that Montgomery was able to establish himself because he "proceeded with confidence, agreeable with everyone, eager and willing to take suggestions". However, he also was said to be regarded by some as chilly or pompous "off-screen."

During the production of So This Is College, Montgomery learned from and questioned crew members from several departments, including sound crew, electricians, set designers, camera crew, and film editors. In a later interview, he confessed, "it showed [him] that making a motion picture is a great co-operative project." So This Is College gained him attention as Hollywood's latest newcomer, and he was put in one production after another, his popularity growing steadily.

Montgomery initially played exclusively in comedy roles; his first dramatic role was in The Big House (1930). MGM was initially reluctant to assign him the role, until "his earnestness, and his convincing arguments, with demonstrations of how he would play the character" won him the assignment. From The Big House on, he was in constant demand. He appeared as Greta Garbo's romantic interest in Inspiration (1930).

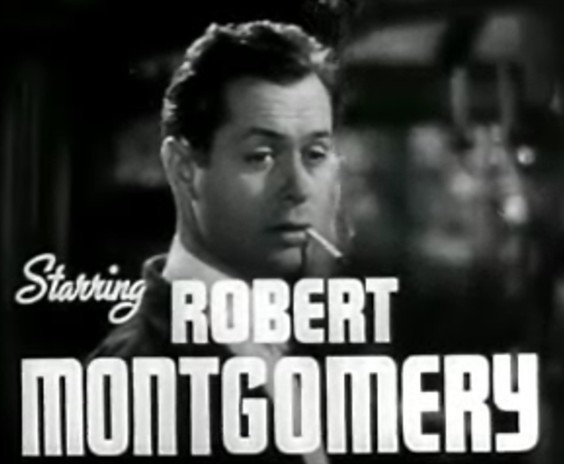
Montgomery in the trailer for Night Must Fall (1937)

Norma Shearer chose him to star opposite her in The Divorcee (1930), Strangers May Kiss (1931), and Private Lives (1931), which led him to stardom. In 1932, Montgomery starred opposite Tallulah Bankhead in Faithless, though the film was not a success. During this time, Montgomery appeared in the original pre-Code film version of When Ladies Meet (1933), which starred Ann Harding and Myrna Loy. In 1935, Montgomery became president of the Screen Actors Guild, and was elected again in 1946. Montgomery played a psychopathic murderer in the thriller Night Must Fall (1937), for which he was nominated for the Academy Award for Best Actor.

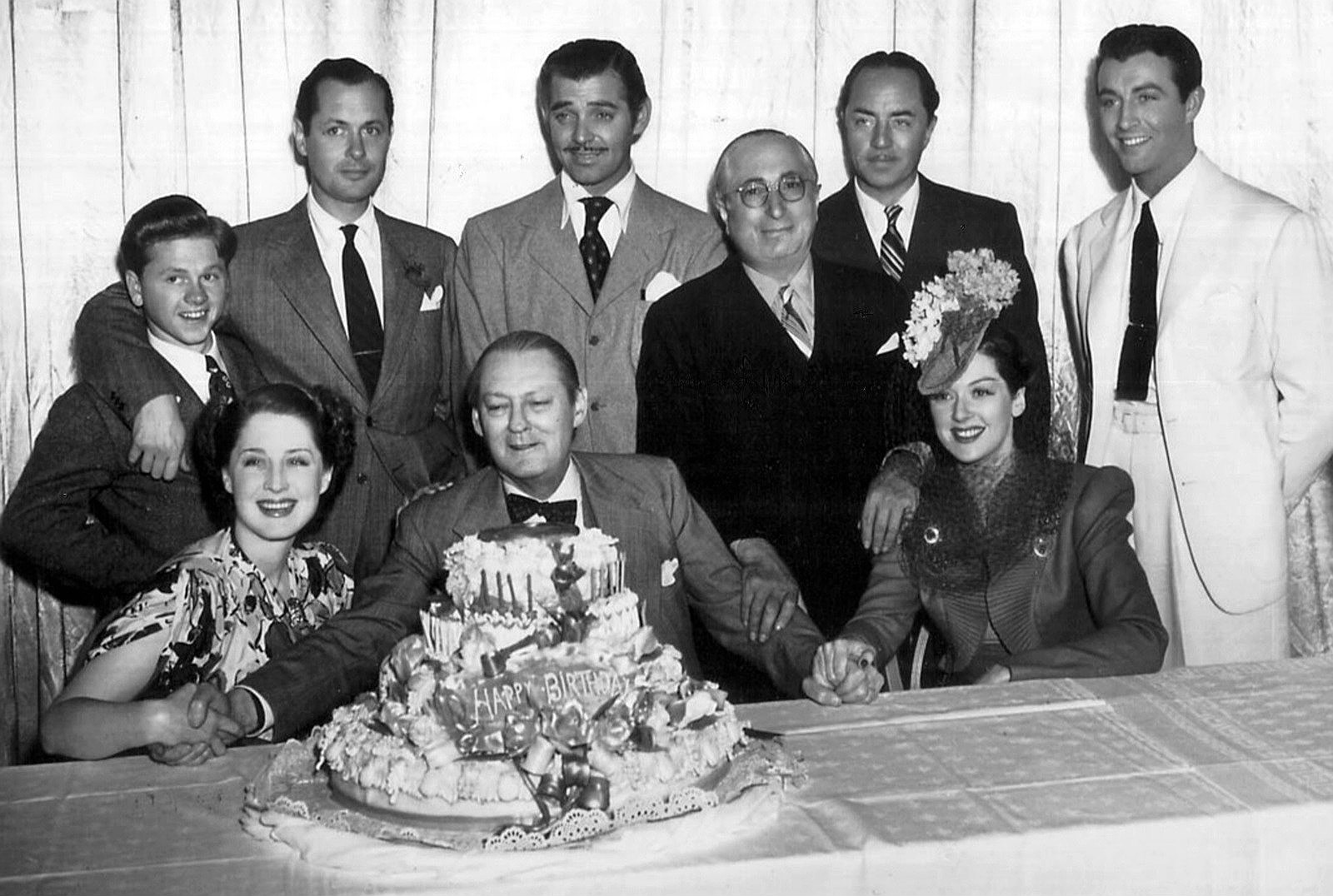
Lionel Barrymore's 61st birthday in 1939, standing: Mickey Rooney, Robert Montgomery, Clark Gable, Louis B. Mayer, William Powell, Robert Taylor, seated: Norma Shearer, Lionel Barrymore, and Rosalind Russell

After World War II began in Europe in September 1939, and while the United States was still officially neutral, Montgomery enlisted in London for the American Field Service and drove ambulances in France until the Dunkirk evacuation. He then returned to Hollywood and addressed a massive rally on the MGM lot for the American Red Cross in July 1940.

Montgomery returned to playing light comedy roles, such as Alfred Hitchcock's Mr. & Mrs. Smith (1941) with Carole Lombard. He continued his search for dramatic roles. For his role as Joe Pendleton, a boxer and pilot in Here Comes Mr. Jordan (1941), Montgomery was nominated for an Oscar a second time. After the U.S. entered World War II in December 1941, he joined the United States Navy, rising to the rank of lieutenant commander, and served on the staff of the commander of Destroyer Squadrons 5 and 60; commanding officer PT-107; aboard the light cruiser USS Columbia; as an assistant naval attache at the U.S. Embassy, London; and as the executive officer of Motor Torpedo Boat 5 (PT-5).

Montgomery, Admiral "Bull" Halsey, and James Cagney on the set of The Gallant Hours (1960)

In 1945, Montgomery returned to Hollywood, co-starring and making his uncredited directing debut in They Were Expendable, where he directed some of the PT boat scenes when director John Ford was unable to work for health reasons. Montgomery's first credited film as director and his final film for MGM was the film noir Lady in the Lake (1947), adapted from Raymond Chandler's detective novel, in which he starred as Chandler's most famous character, Philip Marlowe. It was filmed entirely from Marlowe's vantage point; Montgomery appeared on camera only a few times, three times in a mirror reflection. He also directed and starred in the film noirRide the Pink Horse.

Active in Republican politics and concerned about communist influence in the entertainment industry, Montgomery was a friendly witness before the House Un-American Activities Committee in 1947. The next year, 1948, Montgomery hosted the Academy Awards. He hosted an Emmy Award-winning television series, Robert Montgomery Presents, which ran from 1950 to 1957. The Gallant Hours (1960), a film Montgomery directed and co-produced with its star, his friend James Cagney, was the last film or television production with which he was connected in any capacity, as actor, director, or producer. In 1955, Montgomery was awarded a Tony Award for his direction of The Desperate Hours.

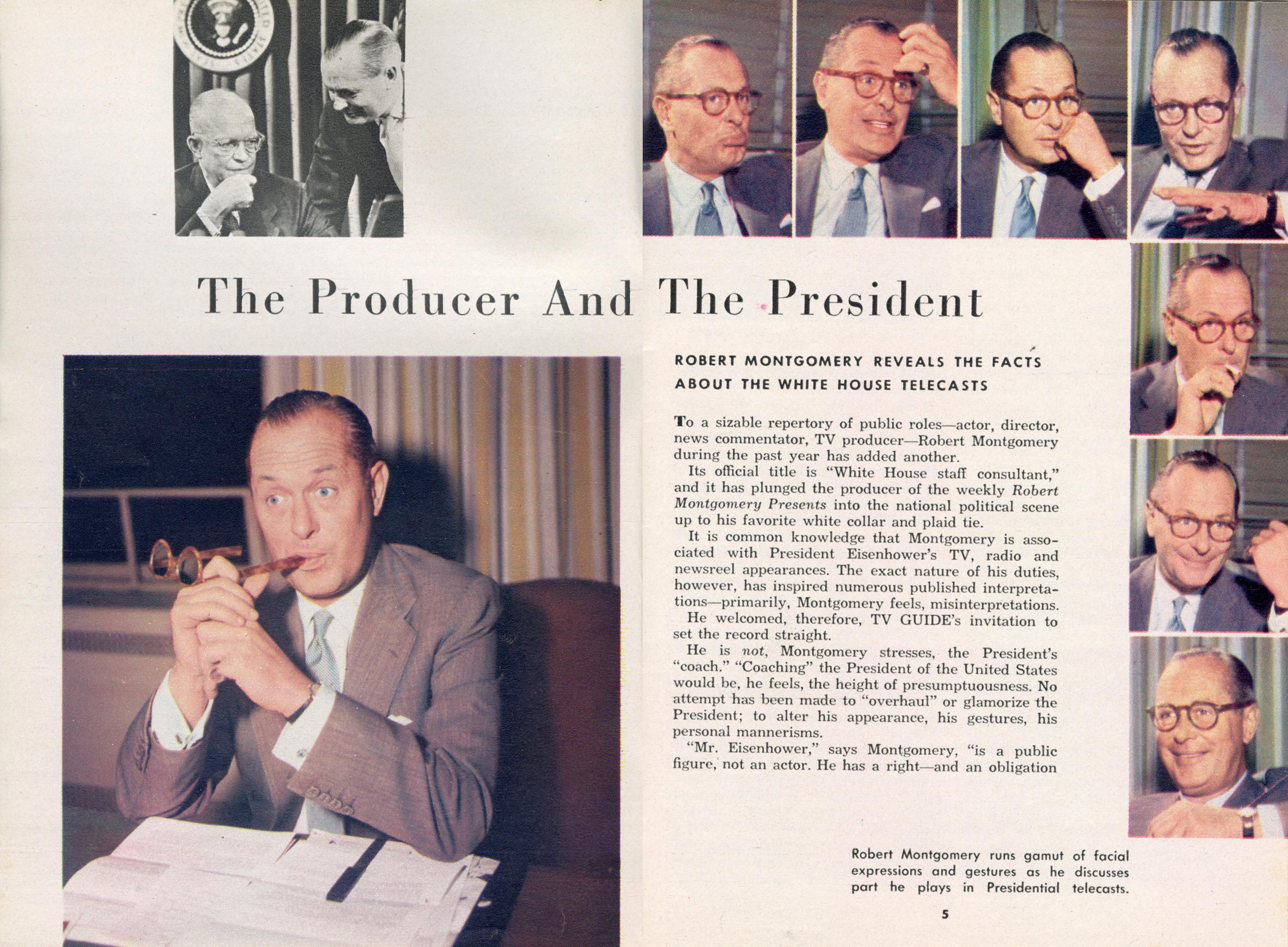
Montgomery in TV Guide, October 30, 1954

A pioneering media consultant, Montgomery took an unpaid position as consultant and coach to President Dwight D. Eisenhower in 1954, advising him on how to look his best on television and maintaining an office in the Eisenhower White House.

Montgomery has two stars on the Hollywood Walk of Fame, one for movies at 6440 Hollywood Boulevard and another for television at 1631 Vine Street.

== Personal life and death ==
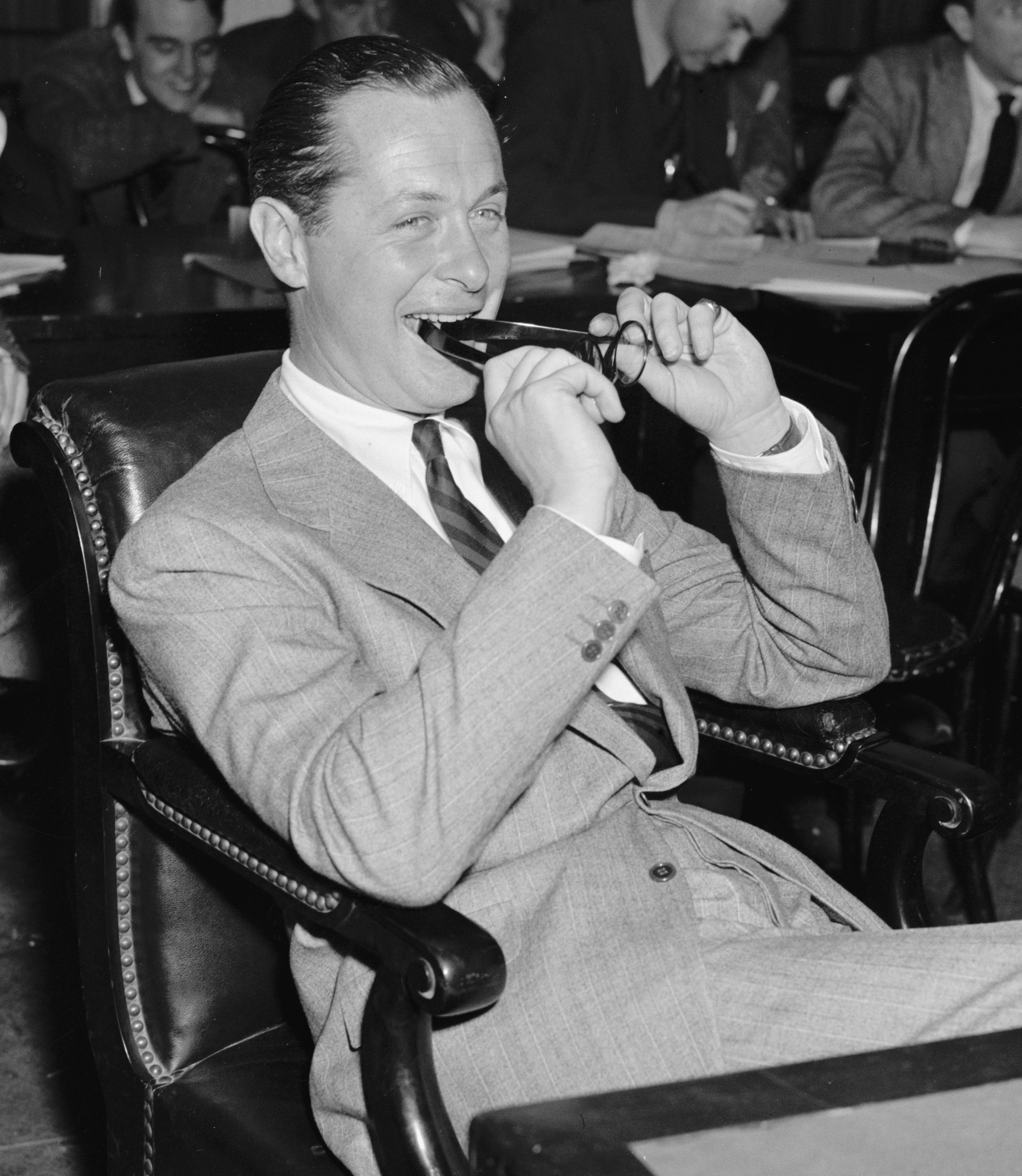
Montgomery in 1939

On April 14, 1928, Montgomery married actress Elizabeth Bryan Allen (December 26, 1904 – June 28, 1992), sister of stage actress Martha-Bryan Allen. The couple had three children: Martha Bryan, who died at 14 months of age in 1931; Elizabeth (April 15, 1933 – May 18, 1995), an actress best known for her 1960s television series, Bewitched; and Robert, Jr., (January 6, 1936 – February 7, 2000). They divorced on December 5, 1950.

His second wife was Elizabeth "Buffy" Grant Harkness (1909–2003); they wed on December 9, 1950, four days after his divorce from Allen was finalized.

He died of cancer on September 27, 1981, at Columbia-Presbyterian Hospital in Manhattan. His body was cremated and the ashes were given to the family. His two surviving children, Elizabeth and Robert Montgomery Jr., both died of cancer as well.

== Filmography ==
Year	Title	Role	Notes
1929	The Single Standard	Extra	Uncredited
1929	Three Live Ghosts	William Foster	
1929	So This Is College	Biff	
1929	Untamed	Andy McAllister	
1929	Their Own Desire	John Douglas Cheever	
1930	Free and Easy	Larry	
1930	The Divorcee	Don	
1930	The Big House	Kent Marlowe	
1930	The Sins of the Children	Nick Higginson	
1930	Our Blushing Brides	Tony Jardine	
1930	Love in the Rough	Jack Kelly	
1930	War Nurse	Lt. Wally O'Brien	
1931	Inspiration	André Montell	
1931	The Easiest Way	Jack "Johnny" Madison	
1931	Strangers May Kiss	Steve	
1931	Shipmates	John Paul Jones	
1931	The Man in Possession	Raymond Dabney	
1931	Private Lives	Elyot Chase	
1932	Lovers Courageous	Willie Smith	
1932	But the Flesh Is Weak	Max Clement	
1932	Letty Lynton	Jerry Darrow	
1932	Blondie of the Follies	Larry Belmont	
1932	Faithless	William "Bill" Wade	
1933	Hell Below	Lieut. Thomas Knowlton, USN	
1933	Made on Broadway	Jeff Bidwell	
1933	When Ladies Meet	Jimmie Lee	
1933	Another Language	Victor Hallam	
1933	Night Flight	Auguste Pellerin	
1934	This Side of Heaven	Actor on screen in theatre	Uncredited cameo: clip from Another Language (1933)
1934	Fugitive Lovers	Paul Porter, aka Stephen Blaine	
1934	The Mystery of Mr. X	Nicholas Revel	
1934	Riptide	Tommie Trent	
1934	Hide-Out	Jonathan "Lucky" Wilson	
1934	Forsaking All Others	Dillon "Dill"/"Dilly" Todd	
1935	Biography of a Bachelor Girl	Richard "Dickie" Kurt	
1935	Vanessa: Her Love Story	Benjamin Herries	
1935	No More Ladies	Sheridan Warren	
1936	Petticoat Fever	Dascom Dinsmore	
1936	Trouble for Two	Prince Florizel	Alternative title: The Suicide Club
1936	Piccadilly Jim	James "Piccadilly Jim" Crocker Jr.	
1937	The Last of Mrs. Cheyney	Lord Arthur Dilling	
1937	Night Must Fall	Danny	Nominated – Academy Award for Best Actor
1937	Ever Since Eve	Freddie Matthews	
1937	Live, Love and Learn	Bob Graham	
1938	The First Hundred Years	David Conway	
1938	Yellow Jack	John O'Hara	
1938	Three Loves Has Nancy	Malcolm "Mal" Niles	
1939	Fast and Loose	Joel Sloane	
1940	The Earl of Chicago	Robert Kilmount	
1940	Busman's Honeymoon	Lord Peter Wimsey	Alternative title: Haunted Honeymoon
1941	Mr. & Mrs. Smith	David Smith	
1941	Rage in Heaven	Philip Monrell	
1941	Here Comes Mr. Jordan	Joe Pendleton	Nominated – Academy Award for Best Actor
1941	Unfinished Business	Tommy Duncan	
1945	They Were Expendable	Lt. John Brickley	Also directed during illness of John Ford (uncredited)
1947	Lady in the Lake	Philip Marlowe	Also directed
1947	Ride the Pink Horse	Lucky Gagin	Also directed
1948	The Saxon Charm	Matt Saxon	
1948	June Bride	Carey Jackson	
1949	Poet's Pub	Dancer	Uncredited
1949	Once More, My Darling	Collier "Collie" Laing	Also directed
1950	Your Witness	Adam Heyward	Also directed
1960	The Gallant Hours	Narrator	Also directed

== Television credits ==
Year	Title	Role	Notes
1950–57	Robert Montgomery Presents	Host	
1957	What's My Line?	Mystery Guest	Aired Jan 13, 1957
1958	Navy Log	Host	Episode: "The Butchers of Kapsan"

== Radio appearances ==
Year	Program	Episode/source
1942	Philip Morris Playhouse	Man Hunt
1947	Lux Radio Theater	Ride the Pink Horse
1948	Suspense	The Black Curtain
1948	Suspense	In A Lonely Place
