= Elizabeth Bryan Allen =

American actress (1904–1992)

- Born: December 26, 1904; Louisville, Kentucky, United States
- Died: June 28, 1992 (aged 87)
- Occupation: Actress
- Spouse: Robert Montgomery (m. 1928; div. 1950)
- Children: 3, including Elizabeth
- Relatives: Martha-Bryan Allen (sister)

Elizabeth Bryan Allen (December 26, 1904 – June 28, 1992) was an American actress.

Her married name was Elizabeth Montgomery.

== Early life ==
Allen was born in Louisville, Kentucky.

== Career ==
In 1925, she appeared in Fred Wall and Ralph Murphy's The Handyman. Variety wrote, "Elizabeth Allen in a role that meant but little was decidedly in character as the small town kid". Don Carle Gillette in The Billboard wrote, "Elizabeth Allen gives a natural and neat performance".

In 1926, she appeared in the comedy Applesauce at the Morosco Theatre in Los Angeles. Katherine Lipke of The Los Angeles Times wrote, "Little Elizabeth Allen, the new ingenue, is from Louisville, Ky., and this fact is revealed in every word she speaks. She has been on the stage but a few years but has been fortunate in appearing in excellent parts in The Handy Man and The Holy Terror." Allen performed in Dancing Mothers, A Family Upstairs and Ladies of the Evening with the Morosco Theatre, where she was a principal actress, in 1926. In 1927, she appeared in Easy Come, Easy Go. Lipke wrote, "Elizabeth Allen is very funny as a liver patient whose disposition may come from her complaint or may be a natural one. It is hard to recognize pretty Elizabeth in the funny make-up".

== Personal life ==
Allen met actor Robert Montgomery in 1924 when they appeared in the Broadway play Dawn. They were married on April 14, 1928 and divorced in 1950, when Allen was granted a divorce on grounds of "mental cruelty". They had three children: Martha, Elizabeth, and Robert Jr. Her sister, Martha-Bryan Allen, was also an actress.

== Broadway appearances ==
- Dawn (November 24, 1924 – January 1925; Sam H. Harris Theatre) as Ann Perkins
- The Handy Man (March 9, 1925 – March 1925; 39th Street Theatre) as Winnie Weller
- A Holy Terror (September 28, 1925 – October 1925; George M. Cohan's Theatre) as Judy Kirkpatrick
- Revolt (October 31, 1928 – November 1928; Vanderbilt Theatre) as Hope
