= Elizabeth Montgomery =

American actress (1933–1995)

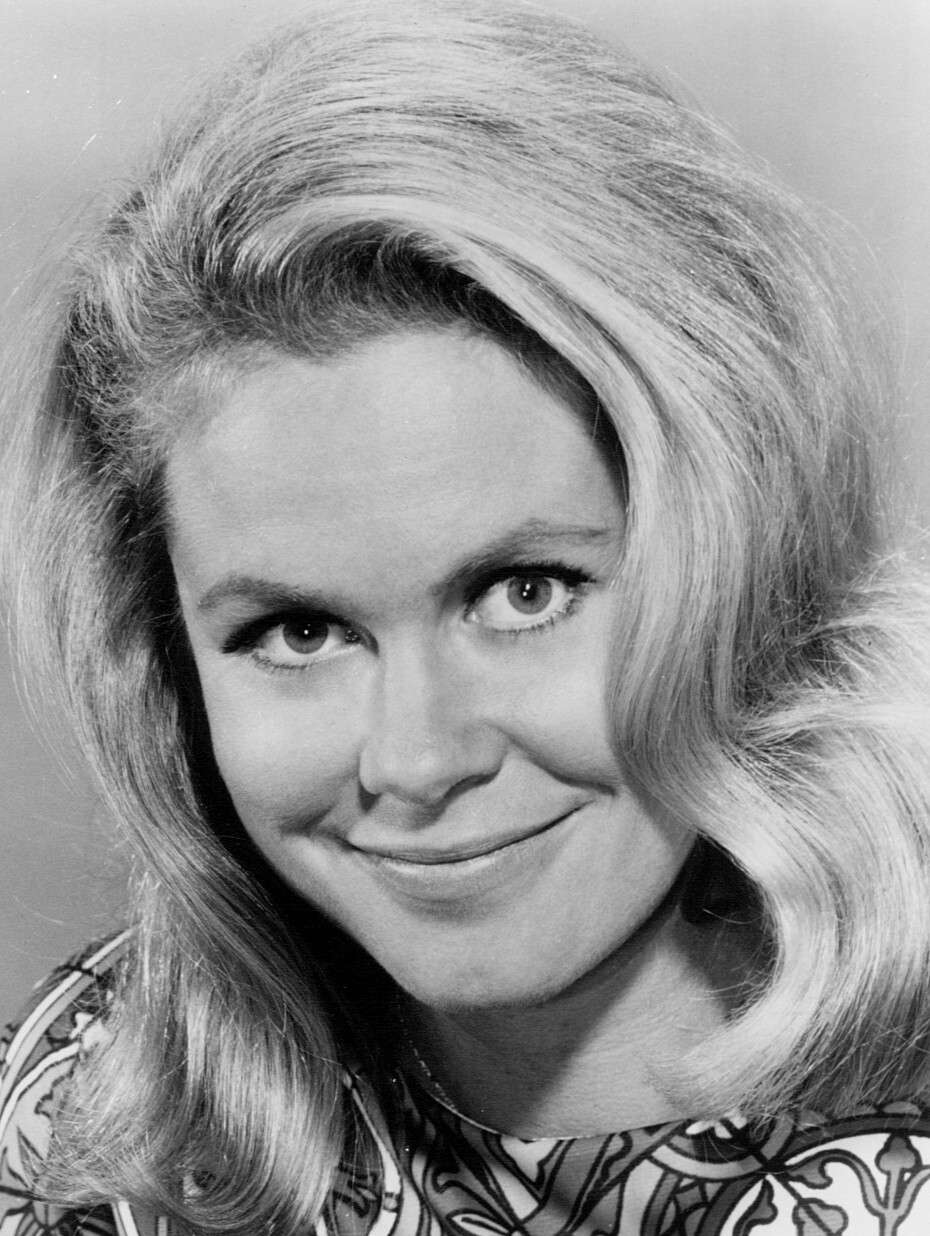
- Montgomery c. 1967
- Born: Elizabeth Victoria Montgomery; April 15, 1933; Los Angeles, California, U.S.
- Died: May 18, 1995 (aged 62); Beverly Hills, California, U.S.
- Education: American Academy of Dramatic Arts
- Occupation: Actress
- Years active: 1951–1995
- Known for: Samantha Stephens on Bewitched
- Spouses: Frederick Gallatin Cammann (m. 1954; div. 1955) Gig Young (m. 1956; div. 1963) William Asher (m. 1963; div. 1973) Robert Foxworth (m. 1993)
- Children: 3
- Parents: Robert Montgomery (father); Elizabeth Bryan Allen (mother)
- Relatives: Martha-Bryan Allen (aunt)

Elizabeth Victoria Montgomery (April 15, 1933 – May 18, 1995) was an American actress whose career spanned five decades in film, stage and television. She portrayed the good witch Samantha Stephens on the popular television series Bewitched, which earned her five Primetime Emmy Award nominations and four Golden Globe Award nominations.

The daughter of actor, director and producer Robert Montgomery, she began her career in the 1950s with a role on her father's television series Robert Montgomery Presents and she won a Theater World Award for her 1956 Broadway debut in the production Late Love. After Bewitched ended in 1972, Montgomery continued her career with roles in many television films, including A Case of Rape (1974) and The Legend of Lizzie Borden (1975), as Lizzie Borden. Both performances earned her additional Emmy Award nominations.

Throughout her career, Montgomery was involved in various forms of political activism and charitable work.

== Early life ==
Montgomery was born on April 15, 1933, in Los Angeles, California, to Broadway actress Elizabeth Daniel Bryan Allen and film star Robert Montgomery. Montgomery's mother was a native of Kentucky and her father was a native of New York. She had an elder sister, Martha Bryan Montgomery (named after her aunt Martha-Bryan Allen), who was born in 1931 and died in infancy, and a younger brother, Robert B. Montgomery Jr. Montgomery was of Irish and Scottish descent. Her great-grandfather, Archibald Montgomery, was born in County Antrim and immigrated to the United States from Belfast in 1847. Genealogical research which was conducted after her death revealed that she and Lizzie Borden, acquitted of the murder of her father and stepmother in 1893, were sixth cousins once removed; both of them were descended from 17th-century Massachusetts resident John Luther. Montgomery portrayed Borden in the television film The Legend of Lizzie Borden (1975), unaware that Borden was her distant cousin.

After attending the Westlake School for Girls in Holmby Hills, California, Montgomery graduated from the Spence School in New York City. She studied at the American Academy of Dramatic Arts in Manhattan for three years.

== Career ==
=== 1951–1963: Early work ===
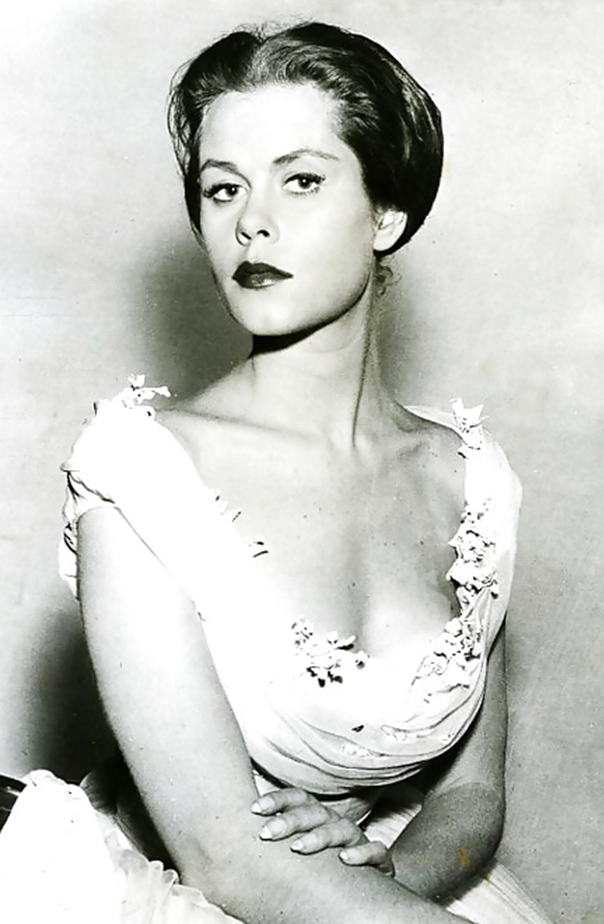
Publicity photo of Montgomery for an episode of One Step Beyond (1960)

Montgomery made her television debut in her father's series Robert Montgomery Presents and on later occasions, she appeared as a member of his "summer stock" company of performers. In October 1953, Montgomery made her Broadway debut, starring in Late Love, for which she won a Theater World Award for her performance. She then made her film debut in Otto Preminger's The Court-Martial of Billy Mitchell (1955). Montgomery returned to Broadway in 1956, appearing in The Loud Red Patrick.

Montgomery's early career consisted of starring roles and appearances in live television dramas and series, such as Studio One, Kraft Television Theater, Johnny Staccato, Burke's Law, The Twilight Zone, The Eleventh Hour, Wagon Train, Boris Karloff's Thriller, and Alfred Hitchcock Presents. Montgomery was nominated at the 13th Primetime Emmy Awards for her portrayal of southern nightclub performer Rusty Heller in a 1960 episode of The Untouchables, playing opposite David White, who later portrayed Larry Tate on Bewitched. She played the part of Rose Cornelius in the Rawhide episode "Incident at El Crucero" (1963).

Montgomery was featured in a role as a socialite who falls for a gangster (Henry Silva) in Johnny Cool (1963), directed by William Asher, and the film comedy Who's Been Sleeping in My Bed? (also 1963), with Dean Martin and Carol Burnett, this time directed by Daniel Mann. After her appearance on Alfred Hitchcock Presents, Alfred Hitchcock had her in mind to play the sister-in-law of Sean Connery, who sees herself as a rival to the troubled heroine in the film Marnie (1964), but Montgomery was unavailable.

=== 1964–1972: Bewitched ===
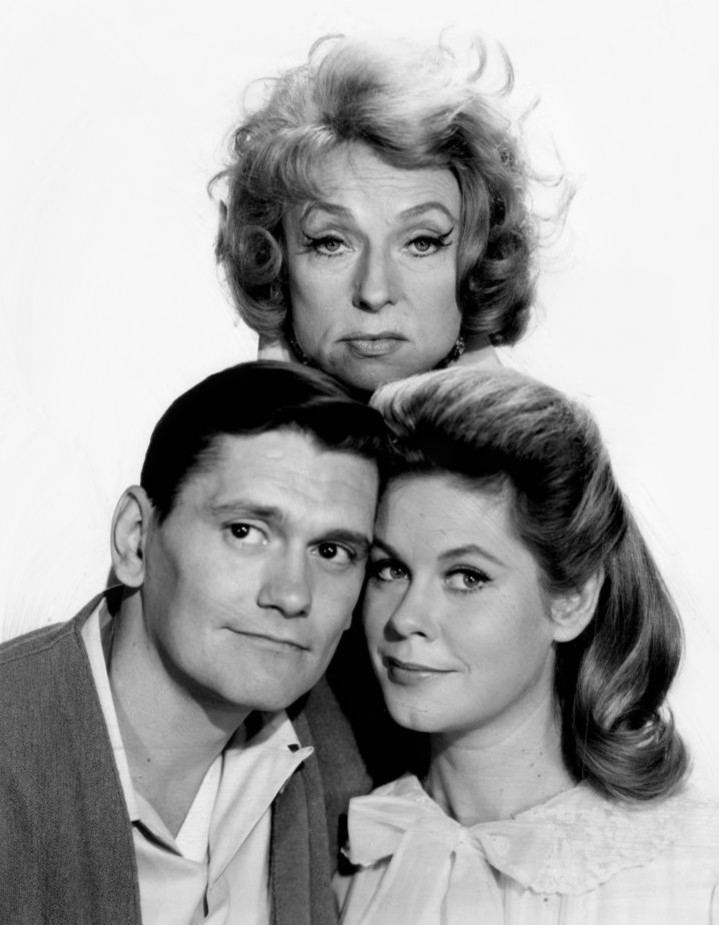
Bewitched co-stars Dick York, Agnes Moorehead, and Montgomery

In the ABC situation comedy Bewitched, Montgomery played the central role of lovable witch Samantha Stephens, with Dick York (and later with Dick Sargent) as her husband. Starting in the second season of the series, she also played the role of Samantha's mischievous cousin, Serena, under the pseudonym Pandora Spocks (a pun on Pandora's Box).

Bewitched became a ratings success (it was, at the time, the highest-rated series ever for the network). The series aired for eight seasons, from 1964 to 1972, and Montgomery received five Emmy and four Golden Globe nominations for her role on Bewitched. Despite low ratings late in the series run, it was renewed for a ninth season to run from fall of 1972. However, Montgomery declined to continue: according to Pilato, she initially consented to a ninth season during the final year of production, then changed her mind and turned down ABC's offer, ending the series.

Montgomery and Asher (under their company name Ashmont, which produced Bewitched) offered a half-hour sitcom, The Paul Lynde Show, to the network for the 1972–1973 season. Lynde's series lasted only one year.

In a parody of her Samantha Stephens role, she made a cameo appearance as a witch at the end of the beach party film How to Stuff a Wild Bikini (1965). The film was directed by Asher, her husband at the time. That same year she also provided the voice of Samantha for an episode of the animated series The Flintstones.

=== 1973–1995: Later career ===
Montgomery returned to Samantha-like twitching of her nose and on-screen magic in a series of Japanese television commercials (1980–1983) for "Mother" chocolate biscuits and cookies which were produced by the confectionery conglomerate Lotte Corp. These Japanese commercials provided a substantial salary for Montgomery while she remained out of sight of non-Japanese fans and the Hollywood industry.

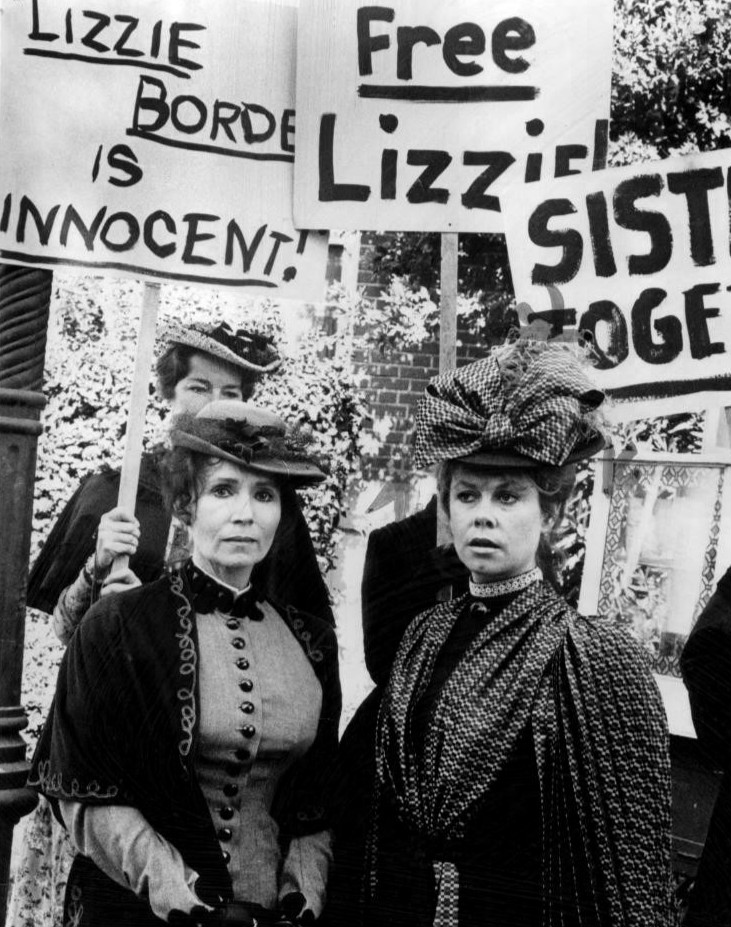
Montgomery (right) and Katherine Helmond as Lizzie and Emma Borden, February 1975

In the United States, Montgomery spent much of her later career pursuing dramatic roles that took her as far away from the good-natured Samantha as possible. Among her later roles were performances that brought her Emmy Award nominations: a rape victim in A Case of Rape (1974), and the accused (but acquitted) murderer Lizzie Borden in William Bast's The Legend of Lizzie Borden (1975). After the actress died, Rhonda McClure, a genealogist, discovered that Montgomery and Borden were distant cousins.

Montgomery made many appearances on the game show Password. Allen Ludden, the show's longtime host, called her the "Queen of Password". Montgomery later played a pioneer woman facing hardship in 1820s Ohio in the miniseries The Awakening Land (1978), for which she earned her ninth Emmy nomination.

In A Killing Affair (1977), Montgomery played the role of a police detective who has an affair with her married partner, played by O. J. Simpson. In the 1977 made-for-TV movie "The Trial of Elizabeth Chase" she plays a woman accused of witchcraft (as referenced by author Herbie Pilato). In the television film Amos (1985), she played a rare villainous role, as a vicious nurse who abuses her wards in a home for senior citizens. The wards are played by Kirk Douglas and Dorothy McGuire, among others. In 1989, Montgomery returned to Broadway one last time in a production of Love Letters, opposite Robert Foxworth. She played one of her last roles in "Showdown", an episode of Batman: The Animated Series, in which she played a barmaid; this was also her final work to be screened, since the episode aired posthumously. Her last television series was the highly rated Edna Buchanan detective series – the second and final film of the series received its first airing on May 9, 1995, only nine days before Montgomery died.

== Personal life ==
In 1954, Montgomery married New York City socialite Frederick Gallatin Cammann; the couple divorced less than a year later. She was married to Academy Award winning actor Gig Young from 1956 to 1963. She married again in 1963 to director-producer William Asher. They had three children: William, Robert and Rebecca. The latter two pregnancies were incorporated into Bewitched as Samantha's pregnancies.

Biographer Herbie J. Pilato wrote that Asher was unfaithful to Montgomery throughout their marriage and that Montgomery later had a two-year relationship with Bewitched director Richard Michaels; Montgomery and Asher subsequently divorced in 1974.

On January 28, 1993, she married actor Robert Foxworth, after living with him for nearly 20 years. They remained married until her death in 1995.

Throughout the run of Bewitched, many references to Patterson, New York, were made on the series. The Putnam County town was the site of the Montgomery homestead, and it was also the place where she spent her childhood summers. In later years, her mother lived in the family farmhouse on Cushman Road.

=== Political activism ===
Montgomery was personally devoted to liberal political causes and in accordance with her political views, she lent her name, along with a large amount of her time, her money and her energy to a wide variety of charitable and political causes. She was a champion of animal rights, women's rights, HIV/AIDS activism and gay rights. She was also an ardent critic of the Vietnam War, she supported Robert F. Kennedy's presidential campaign in 1968 and in later years, she was an active advocate for AIDS research and outreach to the disabled community. In 1988, Montgomery and her partner Robert Foxworth supported Jesse Jackson's 1988 presidential campaign. Professionally, she lent her voice as the narrator of two political documentaries which were critical of U.S. foreign policy, Cover Up: Behind the Iran Contra Affair (1988) and its Academy Award-winning sequel The Panama Deception (1992). In June 1992, Montgomery and Dick Sargent, her former Bewitched co-star as well as her good friend, were grand marshals at the Los Angeles Gay Pride Parade.

=== Charitable work ===
During the last year of her life, Montgomery volunteered at the Los Angeles Unit of Learning Ally, a nonprofit organization which records educational audio books for disabled people. In 1994, Montgomery produced several radio and television public-service announcements for Learning Ally's Los Angeles unit. The following January, Montgomery recorded the 1952 edition of When We Were Very Young by A. A. Milne.

On June 3, 1995, sixteen days after her death, Learning Ally's Los Angeles unit dedicated its 1995 Record-A-Thon to Montgomery. Twenty-one other celebrities lent their talents to a recorded version of Chicken Soup for the Soul, which was dedicated to her memory.

== Illness and death ==
Montgomery suffered from colon cancer. She ignored the influenza-like symptoms during the filming of Deadline for Murder: From the Files of Edna Buchanan, which she finished filming in late March 1995. Due to the late diagnosis, the cancer metastasized from her colon to her liver.

With no hope of recovery and unwilling to die in a hospital, Montgomery chose to return to her Beverly Hills home that she shared with Foxworth. She died on the morning of May 18, 1995, at the age of 62, surrounded by Foxworth and her three children from her previous marriage to William Asher. Her body was cremated.

On June 18, 1995, one month after her death, a memorial service was held at the Canon Theatre in Beverly Hills. Herbie Hancock played music, Amanda McBroom sang and Dominick Dunne spoke about the early years of their friendship when both of them lived in New York City, while Foxworth read many of the sympathy cards sent by fans. Other speakers included her daughter, her brother, her stepson and her nurse.

Montgomery had kept her parents' home in Patterson, Putnam County, New York. Roughly three years after her death, the estate was sold and became a part of Wonder Lake State Park.

== Legacy ==
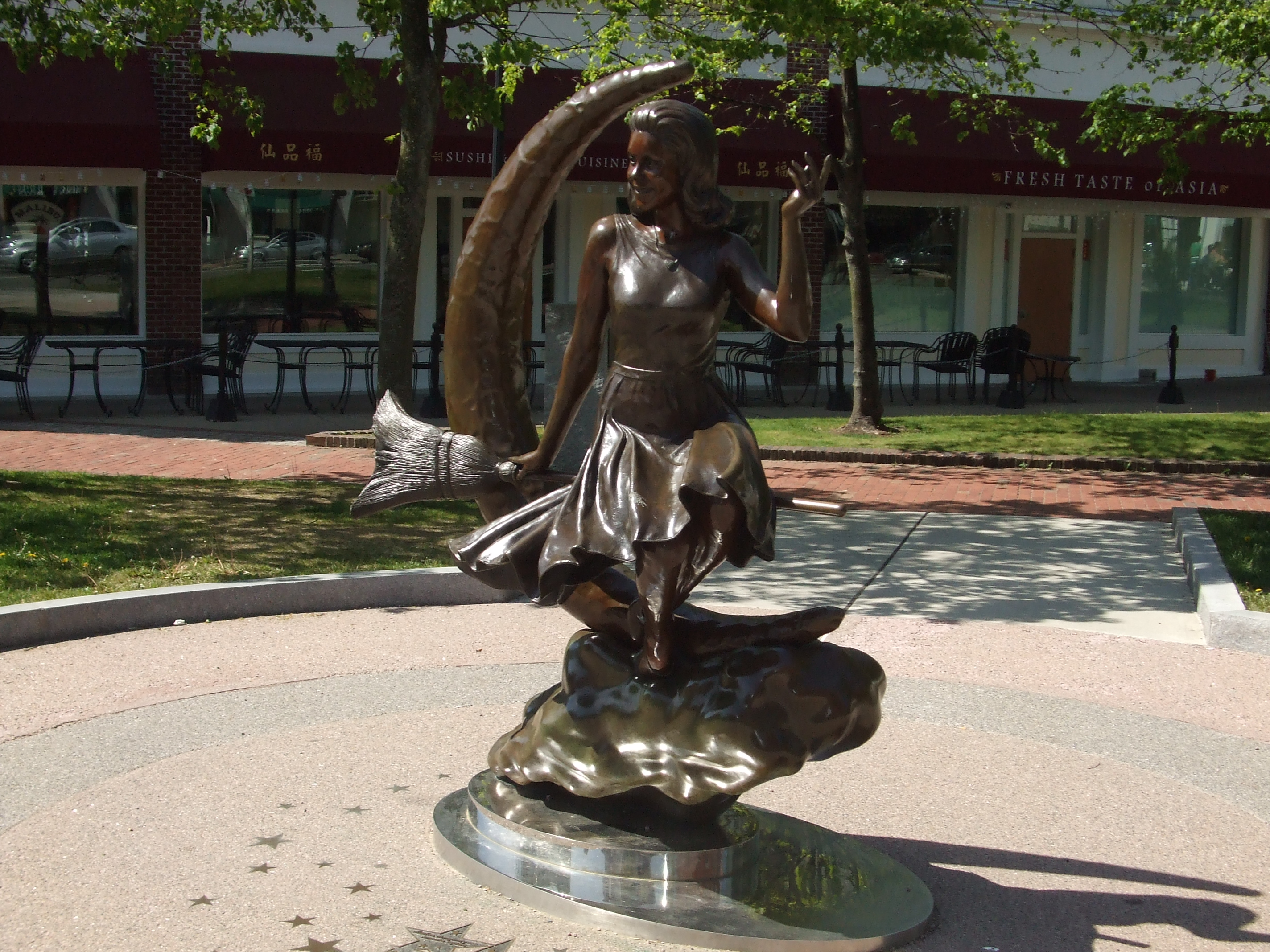
Bronze statue of Montgomery as Samantha Stephens (Salem, Massachusetts)

- On April 19, 1998, Montgomery's family held an auction and a sale of her clothing to benefit the AIDS Healthcare Foundation of Los Angeles. Erin Murphy, who played Tabitha on the Bewitched television series, modeled the clothing that was auctioned.
- In June 2005, a bronze statue of Montgomery as Samantha Stephens was erected in Salem, Massachusetts.
- A star on the Hollywood Walk of Fame was presented in honor of Montgomery's work on television on January 4, 2008. The location of the star is 6533 Hollywood Blvd.

== Filmography ==
=== Film ===
Year	Title	Role	Notes
1955	The Court-Martial of Billy Mitchell	Margaret Lansdowne	
1958	Bitter Heritage	Mary Brecker	Television film
1960	Bells Are Ringing	Girl reading book	Uncredited
1961	The Spiral Staircase	Helen Warren	Television film
1963	Boston Terrier	Millie Curtain	Television film
1963	Johnny Cool	Darien "Dare" Guinness	
1963	Who's Been Sleeping in My Bed?	Melissa Morris	
1964	Bikini Beach	Lady Bug	Voice, uncredited
1965	How to Stuff a Wild Bikini	Bwana's Daughter, The Witches Witch	Uncredited
1972	The Victim	Kate Wainwright	Television film
1974	Mrs. Sundance	Etta Place	Television film
1974	A Case of Rape	Ellen Harrod	Television film Nominated – Primetime Emmy Award for Outstanding Lead Actress – Drama Series
1975	The Legend of Lizzie Borden	Lizzie Borden	Television film Nominated – Primetime Emmy Award for Outstanding Lead Actress in a Special Program – Drama or Comedy
1976	Dark Victory	Katherine Merrill	Television film
1977	A Killing Affair	Vikki Eaton	Television film
1978	The Awakening Land	Sayward Luckett Wheeler	Miniseries; Nominated – Primetime Emmy Award for Outstanding Lead Actress in a Limited Series
1979	Jennifer: A Woman's Story	Jennifer Prince	Television film
1979	Act of Violence	Catherine McSweeney	Television film
1980	Belle Starr	Belle Starr	Television film
1981	When the Circus Came to Town	Mary Flynn	Television film
1982	The Rules of Marriage	Joan Hagen	Television film
1983	Missing Pieces	Sara Scott	Television film
1984	Second Sight: A Love Story	Alaxandra McKay	Television film
1985	Amos	Daisy Daws	Television film
1985	Between the Darkness and the Dawn	Abigail Foster	Television film
1988	Coverup: Behind the Iran Contra Affair	Narrator	Documentary film
1990	Face to Face	Dr. Diana Firestone	Television film
1991	Sins of the Mother	Ruth Coe	Television film
1992	With Murder in Mind	Gayle Wolfer	Television film
1992	The Panama Deception	Narrator	Documentary film
1993	Black Widow Murders: The Blanche Taylor Moore Story	Blanche Taylor Moore	Television film
1994	The Corpse Had a Familiar Face	Edna Buchanan	Television film
1995	Deadline for Murder: From the Files of Edna Buchanan	Edna Buchanan	Television film
2005	Bewitched	Samantha Stevens	Uncredited; archive footage

=== Television ===
Year	Title	Role	Notes
1951–1956	Robert Montgomery Presents	Various roles	30 episodes
1953–1954	Armstrong Circle Theatre	Ellen Craig	2 episodes
1954–1957	Kraft Television Theatre	Various roles	7 episodes
1955–1956	Appointment with Adventure		2 episodes
1955–1958	Studio One	Various roles	3 episodes
1956	Warner Bros. Presents	Laura Woodruff	Episode: "Siege"
1956	Climax!	Betsy	Episode: "The Shadow of Evil"
1958	Playhouse 90	Mary Brecker	Episode: "A Bitter Heritage"
1958	Suspicion	Ellen	Episode: "The Velvet Vault"
1958	DuPont Show of the Month	Miss Kelly	Episode: "Harvey"
1958	Cimarron City	Ellen Wilson	Episode: "Hired Hand"
1958	Alfred Hitchcock Presents	Karen Adams	Season 4 Episode 7: "Man with a Problem"
1959	The Loretta Young Show	Millie	Episode: "Marriage Crisis"
1959	The Third Man	Lorraine	Episode: "A Man Take a Trip"
1959	Riverboat	Abigail Carruthers	Episode: "The Barrier"
1959	Johnny Staccato	Fay Linn	Episode: "Tempted"
1959	Wagon Train	Julie Crail	Episode: "The Vittorio Bottecelli Story"
1960	The Tab Hunter Show	Hilary Fairfield	Episode: "For Money or Love"
1960	One Step Beyond	Lillie Clarke	Episode: "The Death Waltz"
1960	The Untouchables	Rusty Heller	Episode: "The Rusty Heller Story"; Nominated – Primetime Emmy Award for Outstanding Single Performance by an Actress in a Leading Role
1961	The Twilight Zone	The Woman	Episode: "Two"
1961	Thriller	Rosamond "Ros" Denham	Episode: "Masquerade"
1961	Frontier Circus	Karina Andrews	Episode: "Karina"
1962	Checkmate	Vicki Page	Episode: "The Star System"
1962	Alcoa Premiere	Iris Hecate	Episode: "Mr. Lucifer"
1963	Saints and Sinners	Eadie Donelli	Episode: "The Homecoming Bit"
1963	Rawhide	Rose Cornelius	Episode: "Incident at El Crucero"
1963	77 Sunset Strip	Charlotte Delaville	Episode: "White Lie"
1963	The Eleventh Hour	Polly Saunders	Episode: "The Bronze Locust"
1963–1964	Burke's Law	Various roles	2 episodes
1964–1972	Bewitched	Samantha Stephens (and Serena)	254 episodes Nominated – Primetime Emmy Award for Outstanding Lead Actress in a Comedy Series (1966–1970); Nominated – Golden Globe Award for Best Actress – Television Series Musical or Comedy (1965, 1967 & 1969)
1965	The Flintstones	Samantha Stephens	Voice, episode: "Samantha"
1965–1975	Password	Herself	88 episodes Game Show Participant / Celebrity Guest Star
1968	The Carol Burnett Show	Herself	In the audience with William Asher
1979	Password Plus	Herself	Game Show Participant / Celebrity Guest Star
1995	Batman: The Animated Series	Barmaid	Voice, episode: "Showdown" (posthumously released)

=== Stage credits ===
Year	Title	Role	Notes
1953–1954	Late Love	Janet Colby	Theater World Award for Best Actress
1956	The Loud Red Patrick	Maggie Flannigan	
1974	28th Tony Awards	Herself	
1989–1990	Love Letters	Melissa Gardner	

=== Narration work ===
- The Panama Deception (1992)
- Craven Street: Ben Franklin in London, a five-part radio drama (1993)
- Beauty's Punishment (1994)
- Beauty's Release (1994)

== Television coverage ==
- In 1998, the A&E Television Network produced a documentary for its Biography television series about the life and career of Elizabeth Montgomery. The documentary first aired on A&E on February 15, 1999.
- In 1999, the E! cable channel produced a documentary for its E! The True Hollywood Story series titled "Bewitched: The E! True Hollywood Story." The documentary first aired on E! on August 22, 1999.
