= D-low =

English beatboxer

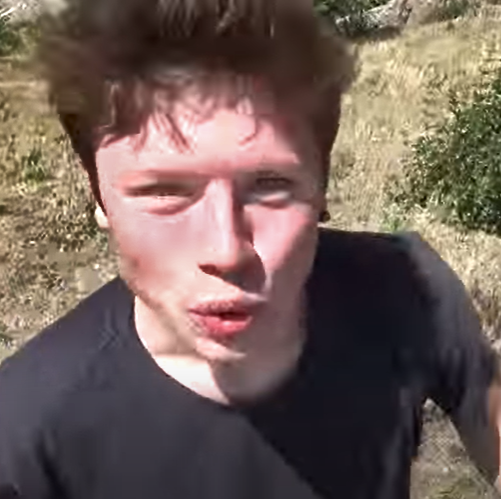
- D-low in 2015
- Born: Daniel Gonzalez Lowes; June 17, 1996 (age 30); Swindon, Wiltshire, England
- Other name: DJ-Low (loopstation)
- Occupation: Beatboxer
- Musical career
- Genre: Vocal Music
- Instruments: Beatboxing; Vocals; Loop machines
- Years active: 2014–present

Daniel Gonzalez Lowes (born June 17, 1996), better known as D-low, is an English beatboxer. He was inspired to start beatboxing after watching Beardyman performing it.

== Achievements ==
As participant in beatbox events
Years	Competitions	Held	Result	Notes	Ref.
2014	UK Beatbox Championships	London, England	1	Under 18s	
2015	European Beatbox Masters	Plovdiv, Bulgaria	Top 8	Solo	
2015	UK Beatbox Championships	London, England	Top 8	Solo	
2015	Cardiff Beatbox Battles	Cardiff, Wales	Top 8	Solo	
2015	Beatbox Battle World Championship	Berlin, Germany	Top 16	Men solo	
2015	Fricaworld Battle	Brussels, Belgium	Top 16	Solo	
2016	UK Beatbox Championships	London, England	1	Solo	
2017	UK Beatbox Championships	London, England	2	Solo	
2017	Vokal.total	Graz, Austria	Top 4	Shootout Battle	
2017	Vokal.total	Graz, Austria	Top 8	Fantasy Battle (Tag team) (with Sinjo)	
2018	UK Beatbox Championships	London, England	1	Solo	
2018	UK Beatbox Championships	London, England	1	Tag team (with Frosty as Kotcha)	
2018	UK Beatbox Championships	London, England	Top 4	Loopstation (as DJ-Low)	
2018	World Beatbox Classic	Foshan, China	1	Solo	
2018	World Beatbox Camp	Krakow, Poland	1	7toSmoke	
2018	Grand Beatbox Battle	Basel, Switzerland	2	Solo	
2018	Grand Beatbox Battle	Basel, Switzerland	2	Tag team (with Frosty as Kotcha)	
2019	Grand Beatbox Battle	Warsaw, Poland	1	Solo	
2019	Grand Beatbox Battle	Warsaw, Poland	3	Tag team (with Frosty as Kotcha)	
2021	SBX Kickback Battle	Online (by Swissbeatbox channel)	1	Solo	

== Discography ==
=== Singles ===
==== As lead artist ====
Title	Year	Album
"Keep Sane"	2022	Non-album single
"Hard Sometimes"	2022	Non-album single
"LanigirO"	2022	Non-album single
"Sing a Little Harmony"	2023	Non-album single
"If My Bones Are Breaking"	2023	Non-album single
"Poison Dagger"	2026	Non-album single

==== As promotional singles ====
Title	Year	Album
"Time To Go" (with Colaps, Wawad, Pash, Alem & Trung Bao)	2020	Non-album single
"insanity" (with Inkie)	2020	Non-album single
