= Bigman (beatboxer) =

- Born: Yoon Dae-woong; June 4, 1999 (age 27); Cheongju, North Chungcheong, South Korea
- Education: Dong-ah Institute of Media and Arts
- Occupations: Beatboxer; singer-songwriter; composer; producer
- Years active: 2017–present
- Musical career
- Genres: Vocal Music; R&B
- Instruments: Beatboxing; beatrhyming; vocals; keyboards
- Label: Sidus HQ

Korean name
- Hangul: 윤대웅
- Hanja: 尹大雄
- RR: Yun Daeung
- MR: Yun Taeung

Yoon Dae-woong (Korean: 윤대웅; born June 4, 1999), better known as Bigman (빅맨), is a South Korean beatboxer, singer-songwriter, composer and producer. Bigman is perhaps best known as Top 8 in the Asia Beatbox Championship 2017, as well as for a viral video from his wildcard winner on YouTube. Bigman officially signed under Sidus HQ and made his debut with released single album DAY BY DAY on May 31, 2019.

== Early life ==
Born in Cheongju when he was in the third year of middle school he started beatboxing as a hobby and means to relieve stress. Under the influence of his parents who worked as a band, he naturally became interested in music, and he started watching beatbox videos on social media.

== Career ==
Bigman began his beatboxing career in 2017 at the By The JB Beatbox Battle on February 11, 2017 in Gunsan and became top 8 in the quarter-final. On August 12, 2017, he was the entry champions to the Die to Die vol. 3 in Busan and became top 4 in the semifinal. He tried to enter competition on Asian Beatbox Championship in Taiwan and predictably won a wildcard for his entry video, granting him entry to the competition. On August 19–20, 2017, he through the elimination rounds and into the knockout rounds, but lost in the quarter-finals and became top 8. Almost immediately after that event, his wildcard winner video went viral, gaining over a million views practically overnight and various viral video channels promoted the video, prompting his appearance on The Ellen DeGeneres Show on September 13, 2017.

On March 25, 2018, Bigman was entered into a world beatboxer competition, Grand Beatbox Battle held in Basel, Switzerland by Swissbeatbox, but only into the elimination rounds. On August 19, 2018, he was entried another world beatboxer competition is Beatbox Legend Classic held in Foshan, China and became top 8 in quarter-final at result event. On October 11, 2018, he appearance with Korean-American Symphony Orchestra on Korean-American Friendship Concert held in Infinite Energy Area Center, Atlanta, US. On November 16, 2018, he officially signed with Sidus HQ for his music activities. On December 2, 2018, he made his official debut as a singer by participating in producer group 015B with the single song Joshua at Metro.

On May 31, 2019, Bigman released his first single album include the title track song is Day by Day produced by Rocoberry and another track song Get Tired of My Love from his upgrading routine battle, with the director by videoartist's DRGN LAKE.

== Musical style ==
Bigman states that his biggest influence is Gene Shinozaki, who shares a very similar style. They both focus on creating songs rather than battle routines and use a colorful mix of techniques to create a single melody. He listens from references to a lot of Pop and R&B music and makes the composer/songwriter his music by using the skill when beatboxing as a source for music and it has excellent vocal skills and mainly expresses a beatbox with melody or melody based on this. The flow of the existing beatbox, which mainly expressed rhythm and tempo, has been changed to a flow of "make music a beatbox", which has a lot of influence on his flow.

== Other ventures ==
Bigman has maintained numerous national and overseas endorsement deals in various industries throughout their career. He starred in the commercial for Hongkong commercial's PlayStation with beatboxer's KRNFX on January 2, 2018 and in Korea commercial's Subway with singer and member of Mamamoo's Hwasa on August 2, 2018.

On August 17,2020,Bigman and actor Ji Min-hyuk were appointed as public relations ambassadors for Goesan Country.

== Performance in competitions ==
As participate on beatbox events
Years	Competitions	Held	Result
2017	By the JB Beatbox Battle	Gunsan, South Korea	Top 8
2017	Die to Die vol.3	Busan, South Korea	Top 4
2017	Asian Beatbox Championship	Taiwan	Top 8
2018	Grand Beatbox Battle	Basel, Switzerland	Elimination
2018	World Beatbox Classic	Foshan, China	Top 8

As appreciates on competitions or events
Years	Competitions / events	Held	Notes
2018	Kunitori Beatbox Battle	Tokyo, Japan	Judges
2018	Die to Die vol.4	Busan, South Korea	Judges
2018	Mouth on Mouth	Seoul, South Korea	Judges
2019	Sound One Flight	Seoul, South Korea	Judges
2019	ARMAGEDDON 2019	Kuala Lumpur, Malaysia	Judges
2019	Beatbox Legend Championship	Atlanta, US	Judges
2020	uClean Youth Culture Concert	Goyang, South Korea	Performing

== Discography ==
=== Single albums ===
Title	Details
DAY BY DAY	Released: May 31, 2019; Label: iHQ, Warner Music Korea; Formats: digital download; Track listing: 1. Day by Day (하루하루) (Prod. Rocoberry); 2. Get Tired of My Love; 3. Day by Day (English ver.); 4. Day by Day (Inst.)

=== Singles ===
Title	Year	Album
"Joshua at Metro" (지하철의 조슈아) (with 015B)	2018	New Edition 06
"Day by Day" (하루하루) (Prod. Rocoberry)	2019	DAY BY DAY
"Get Tired of My Love"	2019	DAY BY DAY

== Concerts ==
=== Headlining ===
- Bigman Concert on Indie Salon (SKT ifland) (2022)

=== Co-headlining ===
- Korean-American Friendship Concert in Atlanta (2018)

== Filmography ==
=== Television shows ===
Year	Program	Network	Roles	Notes
2017	The Ellen DeGeneres Show	NBC	Guest	Season 15, episode 7
2017	Mic Swagger III	MIC SWG	Himself	Episode 16 (with Zizo)
2017	Heart to Heart	Arirang TV	Guest	Episode 111
2018	K-star News	SBS-in	Guest	
2018	Best of The Best	Russia-1	Contestant	Season 2
2019	I Can See Your Voice	Mnet	Contestant	Season 6, episode 3 (AOMG hiphop artists)
2021	HIDDEN : the performance	KakaoTV	Contestant	Episode 3 (with Boi B & Hangzoo team)

=== Television dramas ===
Year	Program	Network	Roles	Notes
2019	Love Alarm	Netflix	OST Singer	Season 1, episode 5

== Awards and nominations ==
Year	Award ceremony	Category	Nominee / work	Results	Ref.
2020	Asian Artist Awards	AAA Grove	Bigman	Won	
