= SO-SO =

- Born: Sota Kato; October 13, 1999 (age 26); Takatsuki, Osaka, Japan
- Genres: Vocal Music; EDM
- Occupations: Beatboxer; singer-songwriter; composer; producer; DJ
- Instruments: Beatboxing; beatrhyming; vocals; loop machines; piano; keyboards
- Years active: 2016–present
- Label: Sokosoco
- Website: Official website

Japanese name
- Kanji: 加藤 創太
- Hiragana: かとう そうた
- Katakana: カトウ ソウタ
Transcriptions
- Romanization: Kato Sota

Sota Kato (加藤 創太, Katō Sōta; born October 13, 1999), better known as SO-SO is a Japanese beatboxer, looper, singer-songwriter and producer. He was a member of the beatbox crew SARUKANI until the group announced his graduation on May 31, 2025.

== Early life ==
Born in Osaka, Sota took piano classes since he was 6 years old because he was influenced by his friends around him. He joined a theater company, Osaka Himawari from elementary school and 10 years into his junior school graduation. He was mainly an extra in musicals, movies, and dramas such as a student in the Showa era and as a child during the war. In his freshman year of high school, he watched beatbox videos on YouTube and self-taught. On his birthday in second grade of high school, he received a looper, BOSS RC-505, from his mother and started a loop station. Entered in Osaka College of Music in 2018, he studied composition, music theory, mixing and continues to produce music.

== Career ==
In April 2019, he became popular because he was the first Japanese beatboxer to enter the top 4 in the loopstation category of the international competition Grand Beatbox Battle held in Poland in July. He also won the championship in the loopstation category of the Asian Beatbox Championship in Taiwan in the same year. In 2020, he formed the beatbox crew SARUKANI and duo group DOILii, with Nijiiro Samurai. He is also start working as a DJ in December 2020.

In October 2021, he participated in international competition Grand Beatbox Battle held in Poland, and his won the championship in category Tag-team Loopstation with teammate, Rusy as SORRY and runner-up in Crew with SARUKANI.

== Styles ==
SO-SO has a high voice that produces a unique sound from his mouth. While self-taught beatboxing from the video Reeps One and starting looping every day, he was inspired by various music, one of which was so heavily influenced by Canadian DJ REZZ that he was fascinated by bass music. After that, he studied electronic game music, musicals and others, so he created his voice with his own musical view.

SO-SO is known to have a unique style in the way of fashion, colorful clothes, wearing glasses and haircut style, resembling the anime character Nobita.

== Other ventures ==
SO-SO has maintained numerous national endorsement deals in various industries throughout their career. He starred in the commercial for Fuji School Bag on 2019–2020. In April 2021, he is in commercial for footwear retails ABC-Mart.

== Performance in competitions ==
As participate on beatbox events
Years	Competitions	Held	Result	Notes
2017	Asian Beatbox Championship	Taiwan	Elimination	Loopstation
2018	Beatbox Battle World Championship	Berlin, Germany	Elimination	Loopstation
2019	Grand Beatbox Battle	Warsaw, Poland	Top 4	Loopstation
2019	Asian Beatbox Championship	Taiwan	1	Loopstation
2021	Grand Beatbox Battle	Warsaw, Poland	Elimination	Loopstation
2021	Grand Beatbox Battle	Warsaw, Poland	1	Tag Team Loopstation (with Rusy as SORRY)
2021	Grand Beatbox Battle	Warsaw, Poland	2	Crew (part of SARUKANI)
2021	Grand Beatbox Battle	Warsaw, Poland	Elimination	Tag Team (with Kaji as Wildcard Guys)

As appreciates on competitions or events
Years	Competitions / events	Held	Notes
2018	12th GATSBY Creative Awards	Tokyo, Japan	Runner-up (on music category)
2018	China Beatbox Championship	Beijing, China	Showcase
2019	Mynavi MIKAKUNIN Festival	Tokyo, Japan	Runner-up
2020	DADERINRIN @Ebisu LIQUIDROOM	Tokyo, Japan	Performing
2020	HaHaHa Osaka Creative Awards	Osaka, Japan	Performing
2020	Tap3x Dance	Toyonaka, Japan	Performing
2020	Drum'n'Bass Exchange 1st Anniversary	Osaka, Japan	Performing
2020	Online World Beatbox Championship	Beatbox Community's Discord	Judges
2021	One Night STAND @Shibuya Live House	Tokyo, Japan	Performing

== Discography ==
=== Albums ===
Title	Details
Party	Released: June 13, 2019; Label: Independent, TuneCore Japan; Formats: digital download; Track listing: 1. Interview; 2. Switch It; 3. Midnight; 4. This is 8bit 5. Psycho Looper; 6. Forest Fire; 7. Catastrophe
NO LOOP NO LIFE	Released: December 7, 2019; Label: Independent, TuneCore Japan; Formats: digital download; Track listing: 1. NO LOOP NO LIFE; 2. Renegade; 3. Camp Fire; 4. Crazy Drive; 5. This is 16bit 6. Ground Bell; 7. Fighting for Someone
Party 2.0	Released: September 14, 2022; Label: Independent, TuneCore Japan; Formats: digital download; Track listing: 1. Error Sound; 2. SO-SO Exercise; 3. Crazy Drive (Boost the Engine); 4. Hakai; 5. 2022; 6. Psycho Looper 2.0; 7. Switch It 2.0; 8. Interview 2.0; 9. This is 32 Bit; 10. Zooming!; 11. Aqua Splash (Album Edit); 12. Sakura [2022 Remaster]; 13. Unknown Language

=== Extended plays ===
Title	Details
Sakura (Remixes)	Released: March 9, 2020; Label: Independent, TuneCore Japan; Formats: digital download; Track listing: 1. Sakura (PIKASONIC remix); 2. Sakura (So-Ma:p remix); 3. Sakura (4* remix); 4. Sakura (NEKOSAN remix)
Beat Pandemic	Released: June 6, 2020; Label: Independent, TuneCore Japan; Formats: digital download; Track listing: 1. SARUKANI WARS (feat Kohey, Rusy & Kaji); 2. Exercise; 3. Seaboard (SORRY remix) (with Rusy); 4. Stranger; 5. NO LOOP NO LIFE (Fellsius remix) (with Fellsius)

=== Singles ===
==== As lead artist ====
Title	Year	Album
"Myten 2016"	2016	Non-album single
"Interview"	2019	Party
"This is 8bit"	2019	Party
"CO3" (feat. Kimura Rin)	2019	Non-album single
"Crazy Drive"	2019	NO LOOP NO LIFE
"NO LOOP NO LIFE"	2019	NO LOOP NO LIFE
"Sakura" (feat. Kimura Rin)	2020	Non-album single
"SARUKANI WARS" (feat. Kohey, Rusy & Kaji)	2020	Beat Pandemic
"Interview 2.0"	2021	Non-album single
"Psycho Looper 2.0"	2021	Psycho Looper 2.0
"Psycho Looper 2.0" (Allen Mock remix)	2021	Psycho Looper 2.0
"2022"	2022	Non-album single

==== As promotional singles ====
Title	Year	Album
"Darkness"	2019	Maronie Fashion Grand Prix
"Zooming!"	2020	ZOOM Vocal Proccesor V3
"I Scream" (with Masayoshi Iimori)	2020	I Scream
"I Scream" (SO-SO beatbox)	2020	I Scream
"Renegade VIP" (SO-SO solo)	2021	ULTRA POWER

== Concerts ==
=== Co-headlining ===
- SARUKANI 1st Tour Live "#BKPK2022" (2022)

== Filmography ==
=== Television shows ===
Year	Program	Network	Roles	Ref.
2021	Sôkai jôhô variety Sukkiri!!	Nippon TV	Guest	

=== Musical theaters ===
Year	Title	Role	Notes	Ref.
2019	Koriyama Rhapsody	Background sound	Extras	
