= Gene Shinozaki =

American beatboxer (born 1991)

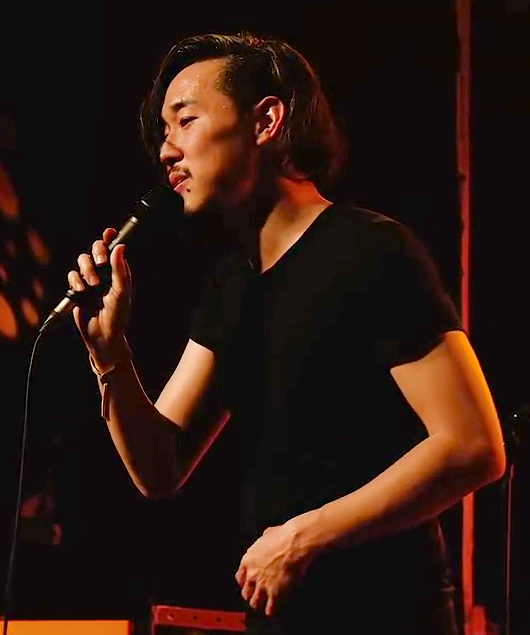
- Shinozaki as a showcase on Grand Beatbox Battle in 2019

Background information
- Also known as: GVSBeatbox
- Born: Gene V Shinozaki; May 29, 1991 (age 35); California, United States
- Origin: New York City, United States
- Genres: Vocal Music; Electronica; Alternative Rock
- Occupations: Beatboxer; Singer-songwriter; Multi-instrumentalist; Music Producer
- Instruments: Beatboxing; Beatrhyming; Vocals; Guitar; Loop machines; Drums; Keyboards
- Years active: 2011–present
- Member of: Beatbox House
- Website: www.geneshinozaki.com

Japanese name
- Kanji: 篠崎 仁
- Hiragana: しのざき じん
- Katakana: シノザキ ジン
Transcriptions
- Romanization: Shinozaki Jin

Gene V Shinozaki (篠崎 仁, Shinozaki Jin; born May 28, 1991), better known as Gene Shinozaki and formerly GVSBeatbox, is a Japanese-American beatboxer, singer-songwriter, street performer, multi-instrumentalist, and music producer. He is currently a member of the beatbox crew The Beatbox House and half of the world-champion tag team SPIDERHORSE.

== Career ==
Shinozaki was originally from California but soon moved to Boston to attend Berklee College of Music before dropping out due to disinterest in the program. While touring with his band "DC Wonder" he decided to pursue a career in beatboxing after watching an interview with Reeps One. Over two years he started street performing, began gigging and eventually was featured on the TV show So You Think You Can Dance in the beatbox/dance duo "Movement Box". Shinozaki started beatbox battling in 2013. In 2015 he won the Grand Beatbox Battle in Switzerland He then became sound engineer for Beatbox television and joined the group Beatbox House. In 2017 Shinozaki released his debut album, "Sound and Human". Shinozaki has been ranked among the top 8 beatboxers in the world.

== Musical style ==
Shinozaki is well known for his signature brand of beatboxing which involves performing the role of an entire rock band using vocal percussion, singing, and lip oscillation techniques. He is one of the first beatboxers to pioneer musicality (over technicality) in the world of beatboxing, focusing on emotional melodies and singing in addition to solid technique. He cites Bobby McFerrin as a direct and primary influence on his sound. He also often performs as a singer songwriter, and electronic music producer.

== Performance in competitions ==
As participate on beatbox events
Years	Competitions	Held	Result	Notes
2015	Grand Beatbox Battle	Basel, Switzerland	1	Solo
2015	American Beatbox Championships	New York, USA	1	Tag Team (with Chris Celiz as SPIDERHORSE)
2016	Grand Beatbox Battle	Basel, Switzerland	Top 4	Tag Team (with Chris Celiz as SPIDERHORSE)
2016	Grand Beatbox Battle	Basel, Switzerland	3	Solo
2016	American Beatbox Championships	Brooklyn, New York	3	Loopstation
2016	American Beatbox Championships	Brooklyn, New York	1	Tag Team (with Chris Celiz as SPIDERHORSE)
2017	Grand Beatbox Battle	Basel, Switzerland	3	Tag Team (with Chris Celiz as SPIDERHORSE)
2018	Grand Beatbox Battle	Basel, Switzerland	1	Tag Team (with Chris Celiz as SPIDERHORSE)
2018	Beatbox Battle World Championship	Berlin, Germany	1	Tag Team (with Chris Celiz as SPIDERHORSE)
2018	Beatbox Battle World Championship	Berlin, Germany	2	Crew (part of The Beatbox House)
2018	Beatbox Battle World Championship	Berlin, Germany	Top 16	Men solo
2021	Grand Beatbox Battle	Warsaw, Poland	Top 16	Solo
2023	Vokal Total	Graz, Austria	1	Tag Team (with Chris Celiz as SPIDERHORSE)

== Discography ==
=== Albums ===
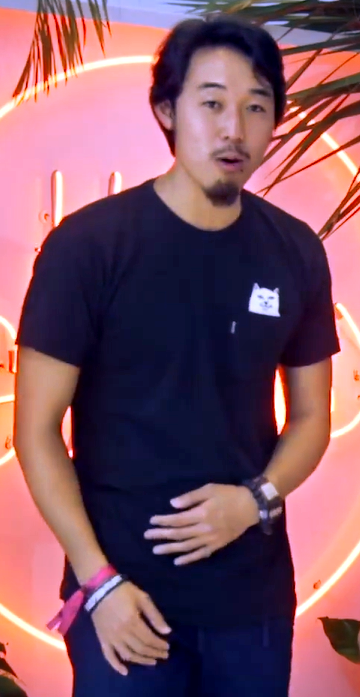
Shinozaki in 2017

Title	Details
Sound and Human	Released: July 29, 2017; Label: Record DK; Formats: digital download; Track listing: 1. Sound and Human; 2. Inner Beauty; 3. The Lesson; 4. Thinkin 'Bout You; 5. Trapanese; 6. Crispy Creams (feat. Fredy Beats); 7. Comigo; 8. From the Abyss; 9. Eastern Fields; 10. Pain; 11. End of Our Lives; 12. Alone in the Dark
Transcend	Released: February 18, 2019; Label: Swissbeatbox; Formats: digital download; Track listing: 1. Sound (feat. Amit); 2. Everything; 3. Hear You Say; 4. Home; 5. Remember; 6. Get Lucky (feat. Bigman); 7. Never Give Up; 8. Dance With Fire; 9. Paradise (feat. Bataco); 10. One More Time; 11. More Than Star (feat. Kaila Mullady); 12. Jigsaw; 13. See You There

=== Mixtape ===
Title	Details
Untitled EP	Released: April 20, 2012; Label: Independent; Formats: SoundCloud; Track listing: 1. Chill On This; 2. Clique; 3. Devour; 4. Freak (feat. Baba Kamal); 5. Breath (呼吸, Kokyū); 6. Microkozm; 7. Tell Me You Love Me; 8. The Apple; 9. Wescoast Nuwave; 10. Zombie Full Frog

=== Singles ===
==== As lead artist ====
Title	Year	Album
"Trapanese"	2017	Sound and Human
"Alone In The Dark"	2017	Sound and Human
"Just Friend (Sunny)" (Trap remix)	2018	Non-album single
"Jigsaw"	2019	Transcend
"Home"	2019	Transcend
"See You There"	2019	Transcend
"Never Give Up"	2019	Transcend
"Pussy Cat"	2020	Non-album single
"Believe"	2020	Non-album single
"Metamorphosis"	2021	Non-album single
"Inside"	2023	Collaboration single with SO-SO
"Fading"	2023	Collaboration single with Hiss and Napom
"Soramimi"	2023	Non-album single

==== As promotional singles ====
Title	Year	Album
"Inner Cosmic Spiral" (Mike Larry Draw & Lex Sadler feat. Gene Shinozaki)	2017	Non-album single
"End Game" (with Emanuela Bellezza)	2017	Non-album single
"JUMPIN" (with Hiss, Codfish & Amit Bhowmick)	2018	Non-album single
"BINGO" (with Colaps, Alexinho, Zekka, River', FootboxG & Puls8)	2020	Non-album single
"Broken Clocks" (Kriij feat. Jordan Peters, J3PO & Gene Shinozaki)	2021	Non-album single
"Hero" (with Swissbeatbox)	2022	Non-album single

== Filmography ==
=== Television shows ===
Year	Program	Network	Roles	Notes
2013	So You Think You Can Dance	FOX	Performing	Season 10, episode 18 (finale) (with Movement Box)
