= Alexander Deyanov =

Bulgarian beatboxer

SkilleR
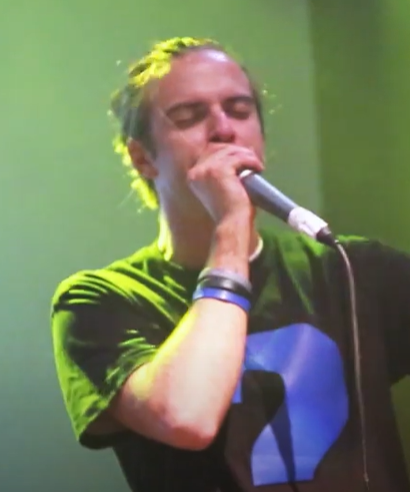
- SkilleR at the La Cup in 2013

Background information
- Also known as: Alexander Deyanov
- Origin: Sofia, Bulgaria
- Genres: Beatbox
- Occupation: Human Beatbox
- Instrument: Human voice

Alexander Deyanov (Bulgarian: Александър Деянов), known as SkilleR, is a beatboxer from Sofia, the capital of Bulgaria. Known as the 'fast mouth' from the East, 'Hip Hop Hrbacek', 'Dr. Leo Marvin', and 'Brainiac 14'; he has brought the art of beatboxing to mass attention in Bulgaria. In 2012, he was named the third Beatbox Battle World Champion in Berlin, defeating Alem of France in the final.

He has been on stage with various international artist like Shaggy, Lumidee, Outlandish, Jaba, N.O.H.A., Stereo MCs, Transglobal Underground, Thursday by Six, The Jettisons, Foreign Beggars, Karma Rocket, The Society Kids, Chemical Toilet, The Pecan Sandies, The Animaniacs, Lisa Gerrard and many others.
