= Grand Beatbox Battle =

International beatboxing competition

- 2019 GBB Poster
- Status: Active
- Genre: Tournament
- Venue: EX THEATER ROPPONGI (2023)
- Locations: Basel, Switzerland (2011-2018); Warsaw, Poland (2019/2021/2026); Tokyo, Japan (2023-2025)
- Years active: 17 years
- Inaugurated: 2009
- Founder: Andreas "Pepouni" Fraefel; Kilian "Kilaa" So; Claudio Rudin
- Organiser: Swissbeatbox
- Website: gbbofficial.com

The Grand Beatbox Battle (commonly abbreviated GBB) is an annual international beatboxing competition hosted by Swissbeatbox. The competition holds multiple tournaments for different forms and categories of beatboxing which include: Solo, Tag Team, Crew, Under 18, Loopstation, Tag Team Loopstation and Producer.

The event follows a traditional tournament format, where competitors take turns performing on a stage, and a panel of judges vote on the winner. To qualify for the tournament portion, beatboxers from around the world must submit "wildcards" online for an invitation or by winning another national and international competition, as well as pass an "elimination" round during the competition.

== History ==
The first Grand Beatbox Battle was held in 2009 in Switzerland. It was part of the BScene Basel music festival where only Swiss-competitors are allowed to participate until 2011, where it was open internationally.

== Results ==
=== Solo ===
==== 2019 ====
Quarter-finals
(Netherlands) B-Art	5
(France) MB14	0
(United Kingdom) D-low	5
(France) Colaps	0
(France) RIVER'	1
(Chile) Tomazacre	4
(Spain) Zekka	0
(Australia) Codfish	5

Semi-finals
(Netherlands) B-Art	0
(United Kingdom) D-low	5
(Chile) Tomazacre	3
(Australia) Codfish	2

Final
(United Kingdom) D-low	3
(Chile) Tomazacre	2
Third place
(Netherlands) B-Art	W
(Australia) Codfish	L

==== 2021 ====
Round of 16
(United States) D-Koy	4
(Azerbaijan) Zer0	1
(France) Alexinho	0
(Belgium) FootboxG	5
(United States) Gene	2
(Netherlands) B-Art	3
(France) RIVER'	5
(South Korea) Hiss	0
(France) Colaps	5
(United States) Vocodah	0
(United States) NaPoM	1
(Spain) Zekka	4
(Canada) Elisii	0
(France) Alem	5
(United States) King Inertia	3*
(Russia) Helium	1*

Quarter-finals
(United States) D-Koy	1
(Belgium) FootboxG	4
(Netherlands) B-Art	0
(France) RIVER'	5
(France) Colaps	4
(Spain) Zekka	1
(France) Alem	1
(United States) King Inertia	4

Semi-finals
(Belgium) FootboxG	1
(France) RIVER'	4
(France) Colaps	5
(United States) King Inertia	0

Final
(France) RIVER'	1
(France) Colaps	4
Third place
(Belgium) FootboxG	5
(United States) King Inertia	0

- Reeps One voted OT in King Inertia vs. Helium. It is worth noting that OT votes were deemed illegal in this event, technically making his vote invalid and resulting in an official score of 3-1.

==== 2023 ====
Quarter-finals
(France) RIVER'	5
(Japan) momimaru	0
(Chile) Mr. Androide	0
(Saudi Arabia) abo ice	5
(South Korea) WinG	5
(Russia) Improver	0
(United States) NaPoM	5
(India) Dilip	0

Semi-finals
(France) RIVER'	5
(Saudi Arabia) abo ice	0
(South Korea) WinG	2
(United States) NaPoM	3

Final
(France) RIVER'	3
(United States) NaPoM	2
Third place
(Saudi Arabia) abo ice	0
(South Korea) WinG	5

Judge Votes
Battle	(France) Alexinho	(United Kingdom) D-low	(United States) Gene	(Bulgaria) Skiller	(France) Wawad	Total Score
(France) RIVER' vs (Japan) momimaru	(France) RIVER'	(France) RIVER'	(France) RIVER'	(France) RIVER'	(France) RIVER'	5-0
(Chile) Mr Androide vs (Saudi Arabia) abo ice	(Saudi Arabia) abo ice	(Saudi Arabia) abo ice	(Saudi Arabia) abo ice	(Saudi Arabia) abo ice	(Saudi Arabia) abo ice	0-5
(South Korea) WinG vs (Russia) Improver	(South Korea) WinG	(South Korea) WinG	(South Korea) WinG	(South Korea) WinG	(South Korea) WinG	5-0
(United States) NaPoM vs (India) Dilip	(United States) NaPoM	(United States) NaPoM	(United States) NaPoM	(United States) NaPoM	(United States) NaPoM	5-0
(France) RIVER' vs (Saudi Arabia) abo ice	(France) RIVER'	(France) RIVER'	(France) RIVER'	(France) RIVER'	(France) RIVER'	5-0
(South Korea) WinG vs (United States) NaPoM	(United States) NaPoM	(United States) NaPoM	(United States) NaPoM	(South Korea) WinG	(South Korea) WinG	2-3
(Saudi Arabia) abo ice vs (South Korea) WinG	(South Korea) WinG	(South Korea) WinG	(South Korea) WinG	(South Korea) WinG	(South Korea) WinG	0-5
(France) RIVER' vs (United States) NaPoM	(France) RIVER'	(United States) NaPoM	(United States) NaPoM	(France) RIVER'	(France) RIVER'	3-2

==== 2024 ====
Quarter-finals
(Saudi Arabia) abo ice	0
(South Africa) Remix	5
(Republic of Ireland) Osis	5
(Russia) Helium	0
(South Korea) WinG	1
(Japan) KAJI	4
(France) Alexinho	0
(France) Julard	5

Semi-finals
(South Africa) Remix	1
(Republic of Ireland) Osis	4
(Japan) KAJI	1
(France) Julard	4

Final
(Republic of Ireland) Osis	1
(France) Julard	4
Third place
(South Africa) Remix	3
(Japan) KAJI	2

Judge Votes
Battle	(France) Colaps	(Belgium) FootboxG	(Singapore) Dharni	(South Korea) Hiss	(United States) NaPoM	Total Score
(Saudi Arabia) abo ice vs (South Africa) Remix	(South Africa) Remix	(South Africa) Remix	(South Africa) Remix	(South Africa) Remix	(South Africa) Remix	0-5
(Republic of Ireland) Osis vs (Russia) Helium	(Republic of Ireland) Osis	(Republic of Ireland) Osis	(Republic of Ireland) Osis	(Republic of Ireland) Osis	(Republic of Ireland) Osis	5-0
(South Korea) WinG vs (Japan) KAJI	(Japan) KAJI	(South Korea) WinG	(Japan) KAJI	(Japan) KAJI	(Japan) KAJI	1-4
(France) Alexinho vs (France) Julard	(France) Julard	(France) Julard	(France) Julard	(France) Julard	(France) Julard	0-5
(South Africa) Remix vs (Republic of Ireland) Osis	(Republic of Ireland) Osis	(Republic of Ireland) Osis	(Republic of Ireland) Osis	(Republic of Ireland) Osis	(South Africa) Remix	1-4
(Japan) KAJI vs (France) Julard	(France) Julard	(France) Julard	(Japan) KAJI	(France) Julard	(France) Julard	1-4
(South Africa) Remix vs (Japan) KAJI	(Japan) KAJI	(Japan) KAJI	(South Africa) Remix	(South Africa) Remix	(South Africa) Remix	3-2
(Republic of Ireland) Osis vs (France) Julard	(France) Julard	(Republic of Ireland) Osis	(France) Julard	(France) Julard	(France) Julard	1-4

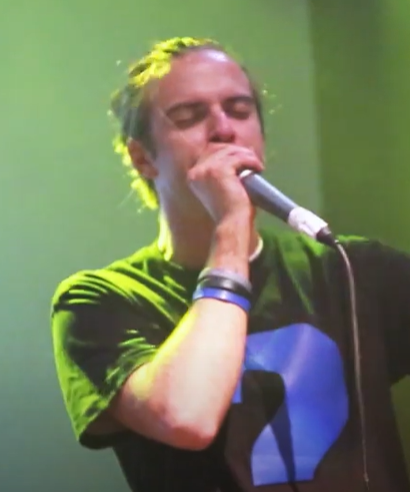
Skiller - 2011 Solo Champion

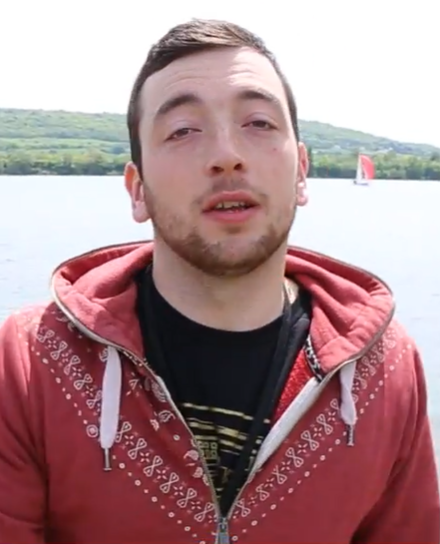
Ball-Zee - 2012 Solo Champion

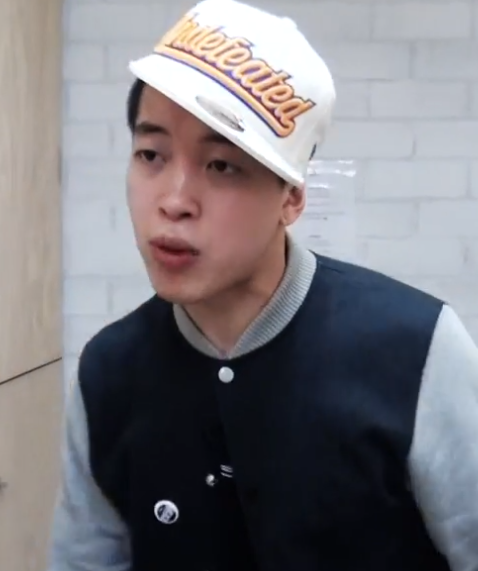
Dharni - 2013 & 2014 Solo Champion

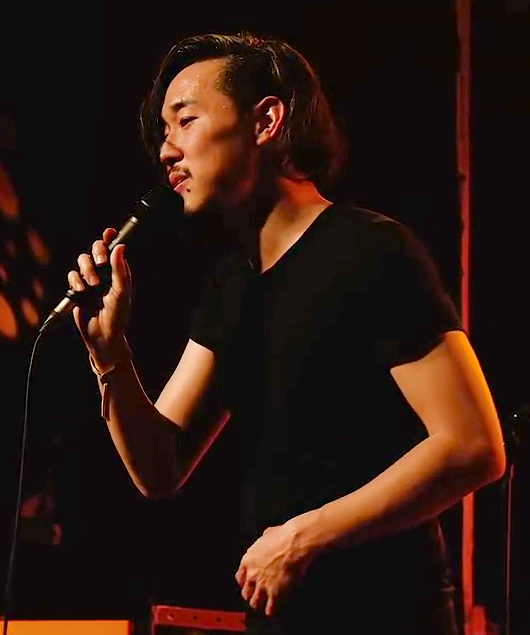
Gene Shinozaki - 2015 Solo Champion

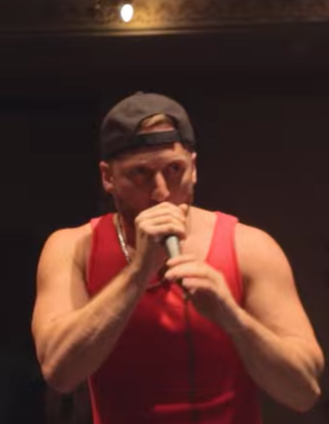
Kenny Urban - 2016 Solo Champion

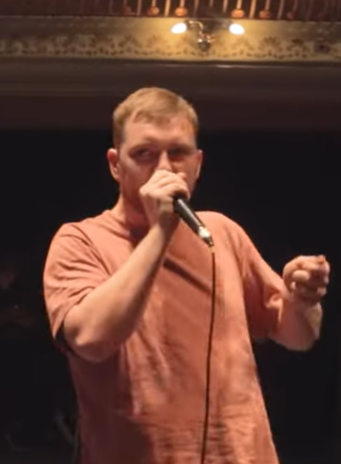
Napom - 2017 Solo Champion

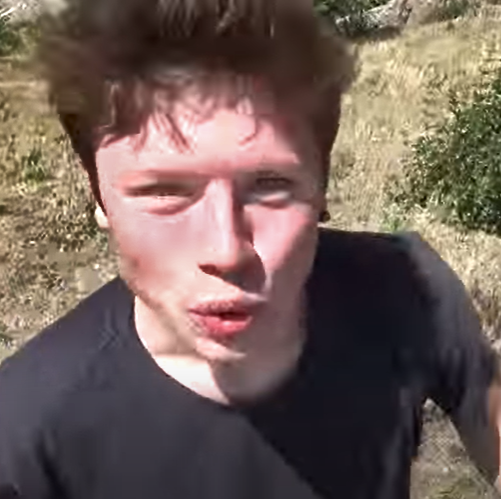
D-low - 2019 Solo Champion

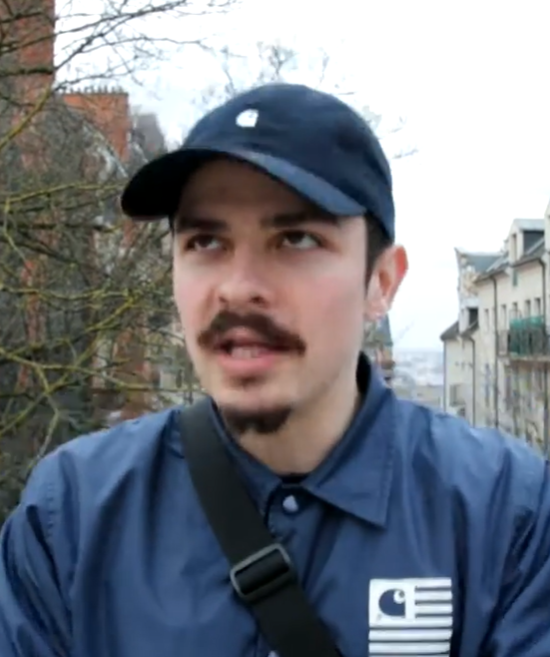
Colaps - 2021 Solo Champion

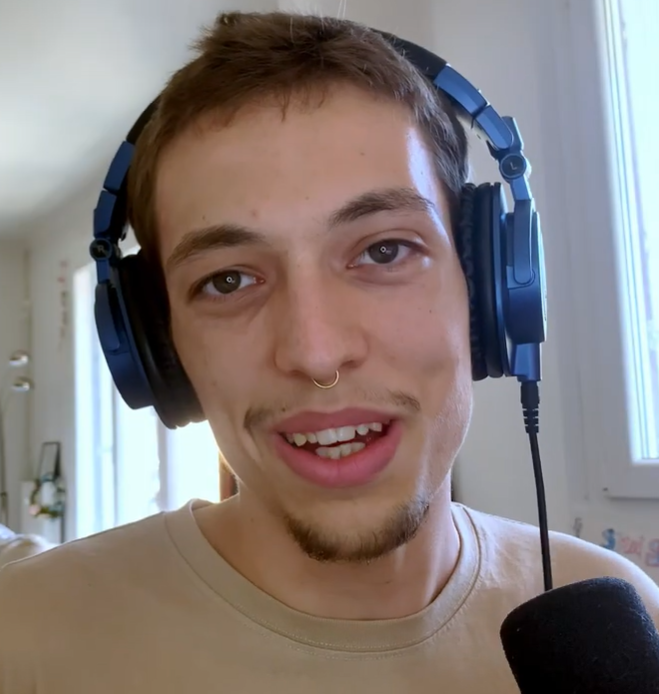
PACMax - 2025 Solo Champion

==== 2025 ====
Quarter-finals
(Japan) KAJI	5
(Australia) Codfish	0
(France) PACMax	5
(Republic of Ireland) Osis	0
(United States) NaPoM	0
(Italy) BlackRoll	5
(South Korea) WinG	4
(Canada) DEN	1

Semi-finals
(Japan) KAJI	0
(France) PACMax	5
(Italy) BlackRoll	0
(South Korea) WinG	5

Final
(France) PACMax	3
(South Korea) WinG	2
Third place
(Japan) KAJI	0
(Italy) BlackRoll	5

Judge Votes
Battle	(France) RIVER'	(United Kingdom) D-low	(Bulgaria) Pe4enkata	(United Kingdom) Ball-Zee	(Vietnam) Trung Bao	Total Score
(Japan) KAJI vs (Australia) Codfish	(Japan) KAJI	(Japan) KAJI	(Japan) KAJI	(Japan) KAJI	(Japan) KAJI	5-0
(France) PACMax vs (Republic of Ireland) Osis	(France) PACMax	(France) PACMax	(France) PACMax	(France) PACMax	(France) PACMax	5-0
(United States) NaPoM vs (Italy) Blackroll	(Italy) Blackroll	(Italy) Blackroll	(Italy) Blackroll	(Italy) Blackroll	(Italy) Blackroll	0-5
(South Korea) WinG vs (Canada) DEN	(South Korea) WinG	(South Korea) WinG	(South Korea) WinG	(South Korea) WinG	(Canada) DEN	4-1
(Japan) KAJI vs (France) PACMax	(France) PACMax	(France) PACMax	(France) PACMax	(France) PACMax	(France) PACMax	0-5
(Italy) Blackroll vs (South Korea) WinG	(South Korea) WinG	(South Korea) WinG	(South Korea) WinG	(South Korea) WinG	(South Korea) WinG	0-5
(Japan) KAJI vs (Italy) Blackroll	(Italy) Blackroll	(Italy) Blackroll	(Italy) Blackroll	(Italy) Blackroll	(Italy) Blackroll	0-5
(France) PACMax vs (South Korea) WinG	(South Korea) WinG	(France) PACMax	(France) PACMax	(South Korea) WinG	(France) PACMax	3-2

==== 2026 ====
Quarter-finals
(Japan) KAJI	5
(South Korea) H-Has	0
(France) RIVER'	5
(United States) King Inertia	0
(Argentina) Astron	0
(Italy) BlackRoll	5
(Belgium) FootboxG	1
(United Kingdom) D-low	4

Semi-finals
(Japan) KAJI	0
(France) RIVER'	5
(Italy) BlackRoll	0
(United Kingdom) D-low	5

Final
(France) RIVER'	4
(United Kingdom) D-low	1
Third place
(Japan) KAJI	L
(Italy) BlackRoll	W

#	Year	Venue	Final			Semi-finalists			Number of participants
#	Year	Venue	Winners	Score	Runners-up	Third place	Score	Fourth place	Number of participants
1	2009	Kaserne, Basel	Marzel	–	Knackeboul	No information			?
2	2010	BCScene Center, Basel	Marzel	–	BeatBrenning	Keumart and Steff la Cheffe			8
3	2011	Kaserne Rossstall, Basel	Skiller	–	KRNFX	BeatBrenning and Babeli			8
4	2012	Kaserne Rossstall, Basel	Ball-Zee	–	Skiller	KRNFX and MC Zani			8
5	2013	Kuppel and Kaserne, Basel	Dharni	–	Alem	Two H	–	K.I.M.	14
6	2014	SUD & Kaserne, Basel	Dharni	–	Two H	K.I.M.	–	Alexinho	11
7	2015	Volkshaus, Basel	Gene Shinozaki	–	Efaybee	Jayton	–	Babeli	13
8	2016	Volkshaus, Basel	Kenny Urban	–	Napom	Gene Shinozaki	–	Babeli	18
9	2017	Voltahalle, Basel	Napom	5–0	Hiss	Alexinho	–	Trung Bao	16
10	2018	Volkshaus, Basel	Codfish	3–2	D-low	Hiss	–	Bataco	15
11	2019	klub Stodola, Warsaw	D-low	3–2	Tomazacre	B-Art	–	Codfish	16
12	2020	Event was cancelled due to 2020 COVID-19 pandemic. An online edition was held instead.							
13	2021	EXPO XXI, Warsaw	Colaps	4–1	River	FootboxG	5–0	Inertia	26
14	2023	EX Theater Roppongi, Tokyo	River	3–2	Napom	Wing	5–0	Abo Ice	18
15	2024	Toyosu PIT, Tokyo	Julard	4–1	Osis	Remix	3–2	KAJI	16
16	2025	EX Theater Roppongi, Tokyo	PACMax	3–2	Wing	BlackRoll	5–0	KAJI	16
17	2026	Arena COS Torwar, Warsaw	River	4–1	D-low	BlackRoll	–	KAJI	20

=== Loop Station ===
==== 2021 ====
Quarter-finals
(France) Rythmind	3
(France) BreZ	2
(Germany) SXIN	0
(United Kingdom) Frosty	5
(France) Chris TheOdian	3
(South Korea) Dice	2
(United States) Bizkit	3
(France) Robin	2

Semi-finals
(France) Rythmind	0
(United Kingdom) Frosty	5
(France) Chris TheOdian	0
(United States) Bizkit	5

Final
(United Kingdom) Frosty	2
(United States) Bizkit	3
Third place
(France) Rythmind	3
(France) Chris TheOdian	2

==== 2023 ====
Quarter-finals
(United States) Bizkit	5
(France) Mirsa	0
(South Korea) Dice	0
(France) Robin	5
(United States) Josh O	1
(Austria) Matej	4
(France) BreZ	1
(Netherlands) AVH	4

Semi-finals
(United States) Bizkit	1
(France) Robin	4
(Austria) Matej	5
(Netherlands) AVH	0

Final
(France) Robin	3
(Austria) Matej	2
Third place
(United States) Bizkit	3
(Netherlands) AVH	2

Judge Votes
Battle	(United Kingdom) Beardyman	(Hungary) Kristof	(France) Rythmind	(France) Saro	(Australia) Tom Thum	Total Score
(United States) Bizkit vs (France) Mirsa	(United States) Bizkit	(United States) Bizkit	(United States) Bizkit	(United States) Bizkit	(United States) Bizkit	5-0
(South Korea) Dice vs (France) Robin	(France) Robin	(France) Robin	(France) Robin	(France) Robin	(France) Robin	0-5
(United States) Josh-O vs (Austria) Matej	(Austria) Matej	(United States) Josh-O	(Austria) Matej	(Austria) Matej	(Austria) Matej	1-4
(France) BreZ vs (Netherlands) AVH	(France) BreZ	(Netherlands) AVH	(Netherlands) AVH	(Netherlands) AVH	(Netherlands) AVH	1-4
(United States) Bizkit vs (France) Robin	(France) Robin	(France) Robin	(France) Robin	(United States) Bizkit	(France) Robin	1-4
(Austria) Matej vs (Netherlands) AVH	(Austria) Matej	(Austria) Matej	(Austria) Matej	(Austria) Matej	(Austria) Matej	5-0
(United States) Bizkit vs (Netherlands) AVH	?	?	?	?	?	3-2
(France) Robin vs (Austria) Matej	?	?	?	?	?	3-2

==== 2024 ====
Quarter-finals
(Austria) Matej	4
(United States) 808Banon	1
(Spain) Cardona	0
(Germany) SyJo	5
(United States) Josh O	0
(Belgium) Yaswede	5
(Hong Kong) Duncan	1
(India) Raje	4

Semi-finals
(Austria) Matej	4
(Germany) SyJo	1
(Belgium) Yaswede	3
(India) Raje	2

Final
(Austria) Matej	0
(Belgium) Yaswede	5
Third place
(Germany) SyJo	1
(India) Raje	4

Judge Votes
Battle	(United States) Bizkit	(France) Robin	(United Kingdom) Frosty	(Luxembourg) Slizzer	(France) Tioneb	Total Score
(Austria) Matej vs (United States) 808Banon	(Austria) Matej	(Austria) Matej	(Austria) Matej	(Austria) Matej	(United States) 808Banon	4-1
(Spain) Cardona vs (Germany) SyJo	(Germany) SyJo	(Germany) SyJo	(Germany) SyJo	(Germany) SyJo	(Germany) SyJo	0-5
(United States) Josh O vs (Belgium) Yaswede	(Belgium) Yaswede	(Belgium) Yaswede	(Belgium) Yaswede	(Belgium) Yaswede	(Belgium) Yaswede	0-5
(Hong Kong) Duncan vs (India) Raje	(India) Raje	(India) Raje	(India) Raje	(Hong Kong) Duncan	(India) Raje	1-4
(Austria) Matej vs (Germany) SyJo	(Germany) SyJo	(Austria) Matej	(Austria) Matej	(Austria) Matej	(Austria) Matej	4-1
(Belgium) Yaswede vs (India) Raje	(Belgium) Yaswede	(Belgium) Yaswede	(India) Raje	(Belgium) Yaswede	(India) Raje	3-2
(Germany) SyJo vs (India) Raje	(India) Raje	?	(India) Raje	?	?	1-4
(Austria) Matej vs (Belgium) Yaswede	(Belgium) Yaswede	(Belgium) Yaswede	(Belgium) Yaswede	(Belgium) Yaswede	(Belgium) Yaswede	0-5

==== 2025 ====
Quarter-finals
(Belgium) Yaswede	5
(France) Mirsa	0
(South Korea) DICE	5
(Germany) SyJo	0
(Spain) Nils	0
(France) Martin Benati	5
(Japan) MAHIRO	5
(Japan) JUNNO	0

Semi-finals
(Belgium) Yaswede	1*
(South Korea) DICE	3*
(France) Martin Benati	5
(Japan) MAHIRO	0

Final
(South Korea) DICE	0
(France) Martin Benati	5
Third place
(Belgium) Yaswede	2
(Japan) MAHIRO	3

- In Yaswede vs DICE, SO-SO voted OT, but OT votes have been illegal in GBB since 2021 and they have always been illegal for the loopstation category. However, SO-SO wasn't forced to vote as there was already a majority for DICE, so the official score is 3-1.

Judge Votes
Battle	(Japan) SO-SO	(France) Saro	(Denmark) KBA	(Russia) INKIE	(United Kingdom) Beardyman	Total Score
(Belgium) Yaswede vs (France) Mirsa	(Belgium) Yaswede	(Belgium) Yaswede	(Belgium) Yaswede	(Belgium) Yaswede	(Belgium) Yaswede	5-0
(South Korea) Dice vs (Germany) SyJo	(South Korea) Dice	(South Korea) Dice	(South Korea) Dice	(South Korea) Dice	(South Korea) Dice	5-0
(Spain) Nils vs (France) Martin Benati	(France) Martin Benati	(France) Martin Benati	(France) Martin Benati	(France) Martin Benati	(France) Martin Benati	0-5
(Japan) MAHIRO vs (Japan) JUNNO	(Japan) MAHIRO	(Japan) MAHIRO	(Japan) MAHIRO	(Japan) MAHIRO	(Japan) MAHIRO	5-0
(Belgium) Yaswede vs (South Korea) Dice	OT	(South Korea) Dice	(Belgium) Yaswede	(South Korea) Dice	(South Korea) Dice	1-3*
(France) Martin Benati vs (Japan) MAHIRO	(France) Martin Benati	(France) Martin Benati	(France) Martin Benati	(France) Martin Benati	(France) Martin Benati	5-0
(Belgium) Yaswede vs (Japan) MAHIRO	?	(Belgium) Yaswede	(Japan) MAHIRO	?	?	2-3
(South Korea) Dice vs (France) Martin Benati	(France) Martin Benati	(France) Martin Benati	(France) Martin Benati	(France) Martin Benati	(France) Martin Benati	0-5

==== 2026 ====
Quarter-finals
(France) Martin Benati	4
(Spain) Nils	1
(India) Raje	5
(France) Tioneb	0
(Japan) Mokbay	3
(Japan) Sora'	2
(Germany) Lennard	0
(Japan) MAHIRO	5

Semi-finals
(France) Martin Benati	1
(India) Raje	4
(Japan) Mokbay	0
(Japan) MAHIRO	5

Final
(India) Raje	5
(Japan) MAHIRO	0
Third place
(France) Martin Benati	5
(Japan) Mokbay	0

Judge Votes
Battle	(France) Rythmind	(China) Zhang Ze	(Germany) SyJo	(United States) BizKit	(Belgium) Yaswede	Total Score
(France) Martin Benati vs (Spain) Nils	(France) Martin Benati	(France) Martin Benati	(France) Martin Benati	(France) Martin Benati	(Spain) Nils	4-1
(India) Raje vs (France) Tioneb	(India) Raje	(India) Raje	(India) Raje	(India) Raje	(India) Raje	5-0
(Japan) Mokbay vs (Japan) Sora'	(Japan) Sora'	(Japan) Mokbay	(Japan) Sora'	(Japan) Mokbay	(Japan) Mokbay	3-2
(Germany) Lennard vs (Japan) MAHIRO	(Japan) MAHIRO	(Japan) MAHIRO	(Japan) MAHIRO	(Japan) MAHIRO	(Japan) MAHIRO	0-5
(France) Martin Benati vs (India) Raje	(India) Raje	(France) Martin Benati	(India) Raje	(India) Raje	(India) Raje	1-4
(Japan) Mokbay vs (Japan) MAHIRO	(Japan) MAHIRO	(Japan) MAHIRO	(Japan) MAHIRO	(Japan) MAHIRO	(Japan) MAHIRO	0-5
(France) Martin Benati vs (Japan) Mokbay	(France) Martin Benati	(France) Martin Benati	(France) Martin Benati	(France) Martin Benati	(France) Martin Benati	5-0
(India) Raje vs (Japan) MAHIRO	(India) Raje	(India) Raje	(India) Raje	(India) Raje	(India) Raje	5-0

#	Year	Venue	Final			Semi-finalists			Number of participants
#	Year	Venue	Winners	Score	Runners-up	Third place	Score	Fourth place	Number of participants
5	2013	Kuppel and Kaserne, Basel	Grison	–	Faya Braz	Camero	–	Slizzer	?
6	2014	SUD & Kaserne, Basel	Faya Braz	–	Hobbit	Was not awarded			?
7	2015	Volkshaus, Basel	Mando	–	Penkyx	Wawad	–	MB14	?
8	2016	Volkshaus, Basel	Thorsen	–	Tioneb	Ibarra	–	MB14	?
9	2017	Voltahalle, Basel	Saro	5–0	Tioneb	MB14	–	Penkyx	?
10	2018	Volkshaus, Basel	Beatness	–	Balance	NME	–	Jarno Ibarra	?
11	2019	klub Stodola, Warsaw	Rythmind	3–2	NME	Inkie	–	SO-SO	?
12	2020	Event was cancelled due to 2020 COVID-19 pandemic							
13	2021	EXPO XXI, Warsaw	BizKit	3–2	Frosty	Rythmind	3–2	Chris TheOdian	?
14	2023	EX Theater Roppongi, Tokyo	Robin	3–2	Matej	BizKit	3–2	AVH	?
15	2024	Toyosu PIT, Tokyo	Yaswede	5–0	Matej	Raje	4–1	Syjo	?
16	2025	EX Theater Roppongi, Tokyo	Martin Benati	5–0	Dice	MAHIRO	3–2	Yaswede	?
17	2026	Arena COS Torwar, Warsaw	Raje	5–0	MAHIRO	Martin Benati	5–0	Mokbay	?

=== Tag Team ===
#	Year	Venue	Final			Semi-finalists			Number of participants
#	Year	Venue	Winners	Score	Runners-up	Third place	Score	Fourth place	Number of participants
8	2016	Volkshaus, Basel	Fabulous Wadness	–	Costik Storm	Mad Twinz	–	Spider Horse	?
9	2017	Voltahalle, Basel	Mad Twinz	–	A&Z	Spider Horse	–	Costik Storm	?
10	2018	Volkshaus, Basel	Spider Horse	–	Kotcha	K-PoM	–	Bery	?
11	2019	klub Stodola, Warsaw	Uniteam	–	Middle School	Kotcha	–	16bitzee	?
12	2020	Event was cancelled due to 2020 COVID-19 pandemic							
13	2021	EXPO XXI, Warsaw	Middle School	–	Rogue Wave	Rofu	–	ONII-CHAN	?
14	2023	EX Theater Roppongi, Tokyo	Rogue Wave	–	Jairo	Rofu	–	Jackpot	?
15	2024	Toyosu PIT, Tokyo	Jairo	–	Fresh Tonic	MiCo	–	Future Monster	?
16	2025	EX Theater Roppongi, Tokyo	MaxSkill	4–1	Hiss & WING	Fresh Tonic	–	MiCo	?
17	2026	Arena COS Torwar, Warsaw	UMA	–	SARSHIAN	Fresh Tonic	–	Uniteam	?

=== Crew ===
#	Year	Venue	Final			Semi-finalists			Number of participants
#	Year	Venue	Winners	Score	Runners-up	Third place	Score	Fourth place	Number of participants
13	2021	EXPO XXI, Warsaw	M.O.M	–	SARUKANI	S.Q.U.I.D	–	The Razzzones	?
14	2023	EX Theater Roppongi, Tokyo	SARUKANI	–	M.O.M	E.O.G	–	YA NA HA	?
15	2024	Toyosu PIT, Tokyo	Kowler Rangers	–	Me0ne	Sound of Sony Ω	–	The Young Drug	?
16	2025	EX Theater Roppongi, Tokyo	The Beatbox House	–	orbitt	Recoll	–	No more participants	?
17	2026	Arena COS Torwar, Warsaw	NOVEL VINTAGE	–	Verbal Damage	Double Team	–	Ohlala	?

=== Tag Team Loopstation ===
#	Year	Venue	Final			Semi-finalists			Number of participants
#	Year	Venue	Winners	Score	Runners-up	Third place	Score	Fourth place	Number of participants
13	2021	EXPO XXI, Warsaw	SORRY	–	Bery	Scam Talk			3

=== Producer ===
#	Year	Venue				Semi-finalists			Number of participants
#	Year	Venue	Winners	Score	Runners-up	Third place	Score	Fourth place	Number of participants
14	2023	EX Theater Roppongi, Tokyo	SyJo	–	Kaos	KBA	–	FriiDon	6
15	2024	Toyosu PIT, Tokyo	KBA	4–1	Antrix	SyJo	–	Kaos	4
16	2025	EX Theater Roppongi, Tokyo	Watt	3–2	LFO	No more participants			2

=== Under 18 ===
#	Year	Venue	Final			Semi-finalists			Number of participants
#	Year	Venue	Winners	Score	Runners-up	Third place	Score	Fourth place	Number of participants
14	2023	EX Theater Roppongi	Julard	–	Marvelous	Lennsi	–	Wand	8

=== 7 To Smoke ===
#	Year	Venue	King	1st Win	2nd Win	3rd Win	4th Win	5th Win	6th Win	7th Win
6	2014	Basel	Alexinho	Battle 4; 5–0 Efaybee	Battle 5; 5–0 Wawad	Battle 6; 5–0 Faya Braz	Battle 7; 4–1 Fozzy	Battle 8; 5–0 Heartgrey	Battle 9; 3–2 Two H	Battle 10; 4–1 BMG
7	2015	Basel	Alem	Battle 22 – Dharni	Battle 23 – Gene	Battle 24 – Jayton	Battle 25 – Kenny Urban	Battle 26 – K.I.M.	Battle 27 – B-Art	Battle 28 – Alexinho
8	2016	Basel	Alexinho	Battle 7; 5–0 Bloomer	Battle 15; 3–2 Bataco	Battle 16; 5–0 B-Art	Battle 17; 4–1 K.I.M.	Battle 18; 5–0 Bloomer	Battle 19; 5–0 Dharni	Battle 20; 4–1 Kenny Urban
9	2017	Basel	Alexinho	Battle 7; 3–1 Rythmind; Xin Wang voted tie	Battle 8; 5–0 Wawad	Battle 9; 4–0 Zhang Zhe; Xin Wang voted tie	Battle 10; 5–0 Gene	Battle 11; 5–0 Cosmin	Battle 12; 4–0 Ah Xin; Funkaztek voted tie	Battle 13; 4–0 Pash; B-Art voted tie
10	2018	Basel	Colaps	Battle 6 – Rythmind	Battle 7; 5–0 Pash	Battle 8 – B-Art	Battle 9; 3–1 Hiss; Beatness voted tie	Battle 10; 5–0 Bloomer	Battle 11; 2–1 Napom; 2 judges voted tie	Battle 12; 5–0 Kénôzen
11	2019	Warsaw	Zekka	Battle 1; 5–0 Mark Martin	Battle 2; 4–1 Akindé	Battle 3; 5-0 Audical	Battle 4; 5–0 Alexinho	Battle 5; 5–0 Mr. Androide	Battle 6; 4–1 SO-SO	Battle 28; 5–0 SO-SO
13	2021	Warsaw	Inertia	No battles uploaded						
14	2023	Tokyo	Alexinho	Battle 2; 5–0 Napom	Battle 3; 5–0 Vahtang	Battle 4; 5–0 PacMax	Battle 12; 4–1 PacMax	Battle 13; 4–1 Pash	Battle 14; 3–2 Max0	Battle 15; 5–0 Inertia
15	2024	Tokyo	Napom	Battle 1; 4–1 Mighty	Battle 16; 3–2 BlackRoll	Battle 17; 3–2 PacMax	Battle 18; 3–2 Remix	Battle 19; 4–1 Abo Ice	Battle 20; 3–2 Bookie Blanco	Battle 21; 4–1 Max0
16	2025	Tokyo	River	Battle 1; 3–2 Inertia	Battle 2; 3–2 Remix	Battle 3; 4–1 momimaru	Battle 11; 3–2 Inertia	Battle 12; 5–0 Bookie Blanco	Battle 13; 4–1 NERO	Battle 14; 5–0 CJ
17	2026	Warsaw	King Inertia	Battle 1; 4–1 (Bulgaria) Markovich	Battle 2 – BizKit	Battle 24; 3–2 (Colombia) Exallos	Battle 25; 5–0 (Chile) Waali	Battle 26; 4–1 (Austria) BigG	Battle 27; 4–1; Shishone	Battle 28 – BizKit

== Participants ==
=== Info ===
- Only countries that were represented at least once in any "Grand Beatbox Battle" are listed.
- The year 2009 cannot be found in this table because no data was found for this year.

Number of Participants each Year in all Countries	2010	2011	2012	2013	2014	2015	2016	2017	2018	2019	2021	2023	2024	2025	2026	Total (Country)
Australia	-	-	-	-	-	-	-	-	1	1	-	-	-	1	-	3
Austria	-	1	-	-	-	-	-	2	-	-	3	3	1	-	1	11
Argentina	-	-	-	-	-	-	-	-	-	-	-	-	-	-	1	1
Azerbaijan	-	-	-	-	-	-	-	-	-	-	1	-	-	-	-	1
Belgium	-	1	1	1	1	1	1	1	-	3	3	-	1	1	2	17
Bulgaria	-	1	1	-	-	-	1	-	-	-	-	1	1	2	1	8
Canada	-	2	2	1	-	-	-	-	2	2	4	1	1	1	-	16
Chile	-	-	-	-	-	-	-	-	-	2	2	2	-	-	1	7
China	-	-	-	-	-	-	1	2	1	-	-	-	-	3	-	7
Colombia	-	-	-	-	-	-	-	-	-	-	-	-	-	1	1	2
(Czech Republic) Czech Republic	-	-	-	-	-	-	-	-	-	-	1	-	-	1	-	2
Denmark	-	-	-	-	-	-	1	1	-	-	1	1	1	-	-	5
France	1	4	-	3	6	7	8	11	7	11	16	11	8	5	13	101
Germany	1	2	2	2	1	2	1	1	-	-	6	10	3	1	-	32
Hong Kong	-	1	-	-	1	-	-	1	-	-	-	-	3	-	2	8
Hungary	-	-	-	1	-	-	-	-	-	-	-	-	4	-	-	5
India	-	-	-	-	-	-	-	-	1	-	-	5	5	-	2	13
Indonesia	-	-	-	-	-	-	-	-	-	-	-	1	-	-	1	2
Iran	-	-	-	-	-	-	-	-	-	-	-	-	2	2	-	4
Ireland	-	-	-	-	-	-	-	-	-	-	-	-	1	1	1	3
Israel	-	-	-	-	-	-	-	-	-	-	1	-	-	1	2	4
Italy	-	-	-	-	-	1	-	-	1	1	-	-	1	1	2	7
Japan	-	-	-	2	-	-	1	2	2	3	6	11	13	14	12	82
Kazakhstan	-	-	-	-	-	-	-	-	-	-	-	-	-	1	-	1
Lithuania	-	-	-	-	-	-	1	-	-	-	-	-	-	-	-	1
Luxembourg	-	1	-	1	-	-	-	1	-	-	1	1	-	-	-	5
Malaysia	-	-	-	-	-	-	-	-	-	-	2	3	1	1	1	8
Netherlands	-	-	2	-	1	3	3	1	3	1	1	1	-	-	-	16
Norway	-	-	1	-	-	-	-	-	-	-	-	-	-	-	-	1
Romania	-	-	-	-	-	-	1	1	-	-	-	-	-	-	-	2
Russia	-	-	-	1	-	2	2	2	3	1	2	6	1	-	-	20
Saudi Arabia	-	-	-	-	-	-	-	-	-	-	-	1	1	-	-	2
Singapore	-	-	1	1	1	1	1	-	1	-	-	1	-	-	-	7
Slovenia	-	-	-	-	-	-	-	-	-	-	1	-	-	-	-	1
South Korea	-	-	1	1	1	-	-	2	4	2	5	6	3	5	1	31
Spain	-	-	-	1	3	-	-	-	-	1	1	-	1	1	1	9
South Africa	-	-	-	-	-	-	-	-	-	-	-	-	1	1	-	2
Switzerland	20	13	13	3	3	3	2	1	-	-	-	-	-	-	-	58
Taiwan	-	-	-	-	1	-	-	-	-	-	-	-	-	-	-	1
Tunisia	-	-	-	-	-	-	-	-	-	-	-	-	1	-	1	2
(United Kingdom) United Kingdom	1	3	4	1	3	1	1	-	6	7	2	2	-	-	3	34
United States of America	-	-	-	1	-	3	8	4	6	3	9	7	2	9	6	58
Vietnam	-	-	-	-	-	-	-	1	2	2	1	-	-	-	-	6

Ref.:

== Grand Beatbox Battle Online ==
In 2020, Swissbeatbox held an online GBB competition to act as a qualifier for the cancelled 2020 Grand Beatbox Battle due to the 2020 COVID-19 pandemic. The event was held in Beatbox Community Discord server and was livestreamed at Swissbeatbox YouTube channel from 4–5 April 2020. The event includes Solo and Loopstation categories.

Results

Category	Champion	Vice Champion	Third place	Fourth place	Ref.
Solo	Zer0	Vocodah	Napom	Cloud	
Loopstation	Frosty	BreZ	Kristóf	Rusy	

== Performances by nation ==
As of the 2025 edition

	Nation	S	L	TT	C	TTL	P	U18	7TS	Total
1	France	4	6	3	1	1		1	7	22
2	United States	3	1	1	1				2	8
3	Japan		3	1	1	1				6
4	Bulgaria	1		1						2
4	Belgium		1	1						2
4	Switzerland	2								2
4	United Kingdom	2	1				1			2
4	Singapore	2								2
4	Germany		1				4			5
4	Denmark		1				1			2
4	Spain		1						1	2
12	Australia	1								1
12	Russia			1						1
12	Austria				1					1
12	Czech Republic		1				1			1
Total		17	11	8	4	1	3	1	10	53

== See also ==
- List of beatboxers
- Beatbox Battle World Championship
- UK Beatbox Championships
- Breath Control: The History of the Human Beat Box
- Mouth drumming
