= K. I. M. =

KIM
- Birth name: Kim Nocifs
- Also known as: King of Vikings
- Born: November 15, 1986 (age 38); Paris, France
- Genres: Vocal music; electronic; dubstep
- Occupation: Beatboxer

Kim Nocifs, also known by his stage name, K.I.M. (born November 15, 1986), is a French beatboxer, known for electronic and dubstep style beats.

K.I.M. began beatboxing in 2007, making his international début in 2009 at the French Team Beatbox Championship. With his group Nocifs Sound System, K.I.M won the competition. He also won the same competition the following year. In 2011, K.I.M. won the French Beatbox Championship.

He is now a member of Team Paname with the French slogan "Le beatbox c’est mieux maintenant."

== Contests ==
- French Team Beatbox Championship 2009 - first place
- French Team Beatbox Championship 2010 - first place
- French Beatbox Championship 2010 - semi-finals
- French Beatbox Championship 2011 - first place
- French Beatbox Championship 2013 - second place
- Grand Beatbox Battle 2013 Showcase - fourth place
- Beatbox Battle World Championship 2012 - top eight
- Emperor Of The Mic Beatbox Battle 2012 - quarter finals
- TKO - Paris, 2011
- J'attaque du Mic - Paris, 2010
