= Beatbox House =

American beatbox crew

The Beatbox House
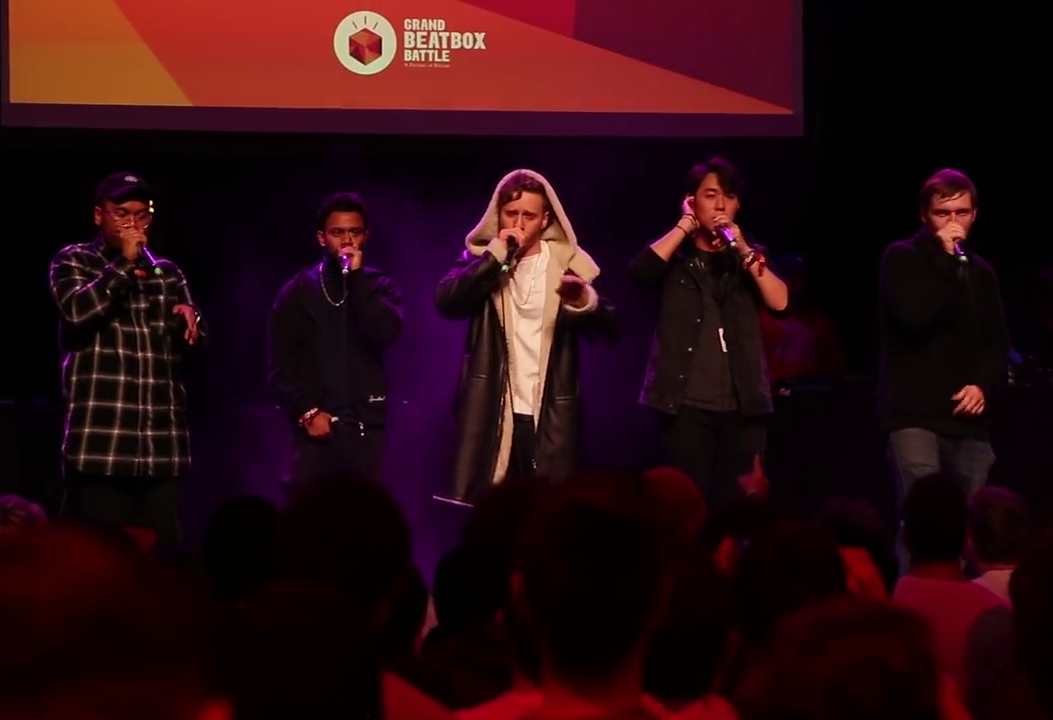
- The Beatbox House's showcase on Grand Beatbox Battle 2018. (from left to right : Chris, Amit, Kenny, Gene and NaPoM)

Background information
- Origin: New York City, [US
- Genres: Beatboxing; Vocal music
- Years active: 2011–present
- Label: Independent
- Members: Neil Meadows; Amit Bhowmick; Gene Shinozaki; Chris Celiz; Kenny Urban
- Past members: Mark Martin; Kaila Mullady

The Beatbox House is an American beatbox crew based in New York City originally consisting of six beatboxers. The Beatbox House has since its formation helped many beatboxers along their journey.

== Formation ==
The Beatbox House began as a residence home in Brooklyn, New York for beatboxer Chris Celiz and Izzy Freedman who one day had an idea to create a place for beatboxers to connect and socialize. Beatboxers Mark Martin and Johnny Buffalo lived in the house and organized jam sessions and performances for beatboxers. Artists from worldwide locations would lodge in the house when traveling for shows. Eventually, beatboxers Neil Meadows of Pennsylvania, Kenny Urban of Connecticut, Amit Bhowmick, Kaila Mullady of New York City and Gene Shinozaki of Boston, met up along with Chris at the American Human Beatbox festival, joined the residency and decided to form an official group. They often did their performances busking in the subways and streets of New York City.

== Members ==
=== Neil Meadows (2011-) ===
Neil Meadows (known as NaPoM) is a beatboxer, whose titles include: Grand Beatbox Battle Vice Champion (2016, 2023), Grand Beatbox Battle Champion (2017), Vice World Champion (2015), two-time American Beatbox Champion (2014, 2015), American Tag-team Champion (2014), Midwest Champion (2014) and two-time Unity Champion. His beatbox style involves his signature percussive sounds and extensive liproll techniques. He started beatboxing after high school, won the 2014 American beatbox championships at age 18 and was given the opportunity to compete at the Beatbox Battle World Championship where he earned his title as the Vice World Beatbox Champion (2015). He is also known for his work with fellow Beatbox House member Kenny Urban as "K-POM". In 2018, he released a beatbox album "Lips" with Swissbeatbox. Napom is well-known for revolutionizing the use of different liproll techniques such as the inward liproll and sub-liproll bass.

=== Amit Bhowmick (2011-) ===
Amit Bhowmick is a hip hop artist based in America who started beatboxing at the age of 14. Amit is originally from Bangladesh. His beatbox sound involves his extensive usage of technical beats and deep bass sounds. His title credits include Midwest Champion (2012) and East Coast Champion (2014). In 2018, he won Smash Sounds, the first ever hybrid Beatbox Battle & Super Smash Bros tournament. He is also known for his signature and original sound, the "OD Bass".

=== Gene Shinozaki (2011-) ===
Gene Shinozaki is a beatbox musician from Boston, MA. He began his music career attending Berklee College of Music, studying drumming as a major, before dropping out to pursue a career in beatboxing. His beatbox style involves his imitation of guitar power chords using lip oscillation techniques, his melodic sounds, and clicks. He often incorporates singer songwriter elements into his performances. He cites Bobby McFerrin as a primary influence to his sound. He is a Grand Beatbox Battle Champion (2015), and with fellow Beatbox House member, Chris Celiz, won the titles of World Beatbox Tag-team Champion (2018), American Tag-team Champion (2015) and Grand Beatbox Battle Tag-team Champion (2018) as "Spiderhorse".

=== Chris Celiz (2011-) ===
Chris Celiz, the founding member of the Beatbox House, is a beatboxer, musician and teacher. He is the American Tag-team Champion (2015) together with Gene Shinozaki as the group "Spiderhorse". He is most known for his signature percussive grooves and harmonic sounds. He has done work for artists such as Harry Belafonte, Bryonn Bain, and Dana Leong. He is one of the top North American beatboxers, and with fellow Beatbox House member, Gene Shinozaki, won the titles of World Beatbox Tag-team Champion (2018) and Grand Beatbox Battle Tag-team Champion (2018) as "Spiderhorse".

=== Kenny Urban (2011-) ===
Kenny Urban is an American beatboxer and singer, whose title credits include Grand Beatbox Champion (2016), Vice American Beatbox Champion (2015), American Tag-team Champion (2014) and two-time Unity Beatbox Champion. His beatbox style involves bass emphasized beats, synth sounds and extensive singing. He is a private beatbox instructor and has also taught workshops in various schools such as Harvard University and The Raymond York Elementary School. Kenny is also a part of the beatbox tag-team "K-POM" together with NaPom.

== Former Members ==
=== Mark Martin (201?-2018) ===
Mark Martin (formerly Mandibul) is an American beatboxer, singer and teacher from Connecticut. Mark has won titles such as American Beatbox Champion (2016) and Human Beatbox Festival BeatRhyme Champion (2016). Mark is also currently a part of the tag team "Lightship" (formerly Power Couple) consisting of him and Kaila Mullady. Mark Martin left the beatbox house in 2018 together with his fellow tag-team member and girlfriend Kaila Mullady.

=== Kaila Mullady (2011-2018) ===
Kaila Mullady is an american beatboxer, beatrhyming champion, singer and rapper. Kaila holds the titles of Beatbox World Champion (2015, 2018) in the solo female category, three-time American Loopstation Champion, three-time reigning Beatrhyming Champion and Vice American Champion (2014). Kaila is an active beatboxer and has been a part of many different productions which includes but are not limited to the Broadway musical Freestyle Love Supreme (2019-2020). She is also a part of the tag team "Power Couple" and the beatbox duo "Light Ship," together with her boyfriend Mark Martin. Together with Mark she is also a teacher and the head director of the speech therapy project BEAT Global's Beatrocker program. Kaila also collaborates and performs together with her mentor Kid Lucky under the group name "The Adventures of Kaila and the Kid". Kaila is the producer of the American Beatbox Championships since 2016. Kaila left the Beatbox House together with her boyfriend and fellow tag-team member Mark Martin in 2018.
