= Alem (beatboxer) =

French beatboxer

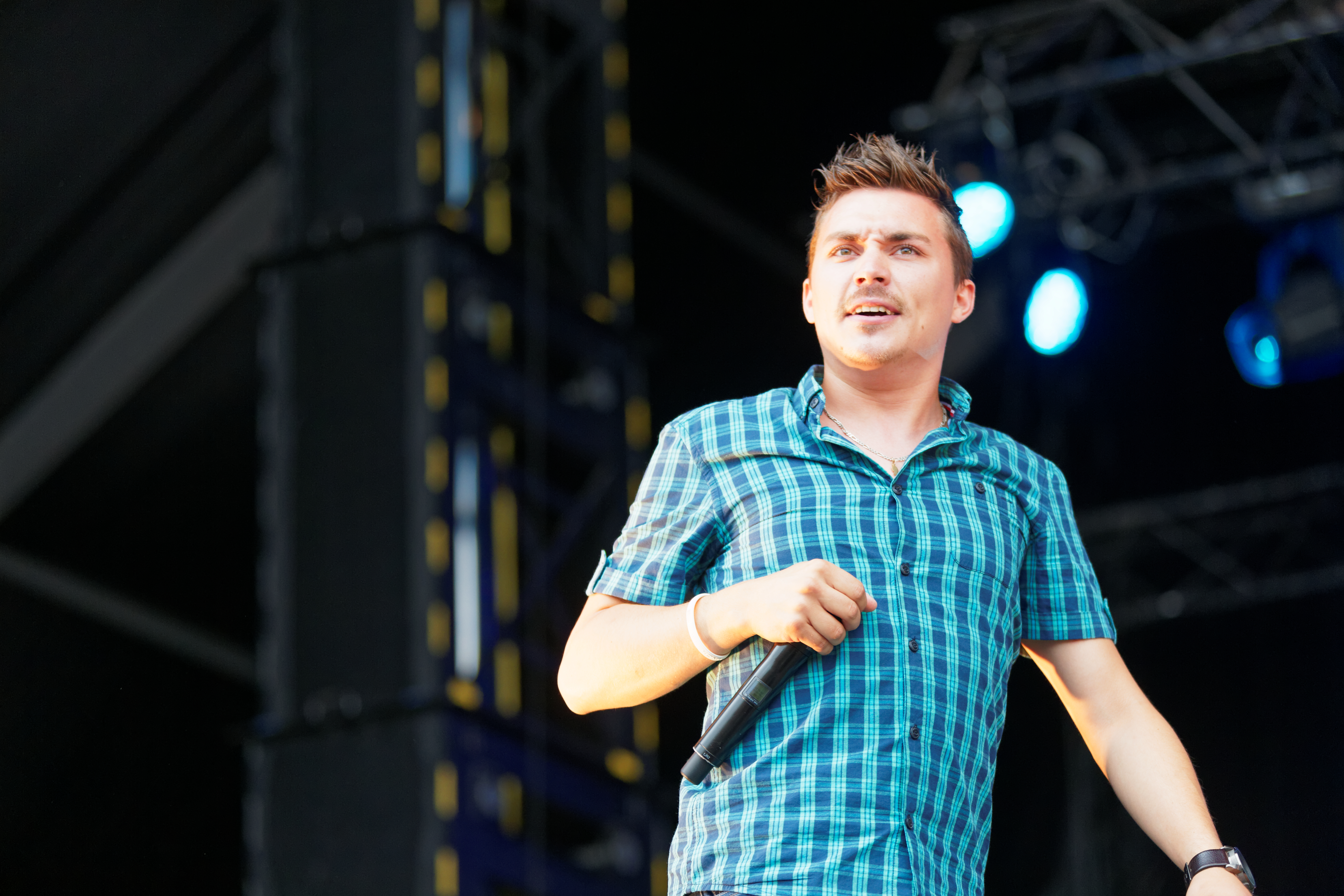
- Alem at the Vieilles Charrues Festival in July 2015
- Born: Maël Gayaud; March 25, 1992 (age 33); Lyon, France
- Occupation: Beatboxer
- Musical career
- Instruments: Beatboxing; Vocals; Handpan; Drums
- Years active: 2008–present
- Website: www.alembeatbox.com

Maël Gayaud (born 25 March 1992), better known as Alem is a French beatboxer.

Before becoming a beatboxer, Gayaud used to play drums. He began beatboxing at the age of 11. In 2015 he won the Beatbox Battle World Champion after defeating NaPoM of United States in the final. Gayaud has also collaborated on several musical projects (Group of Jazz, gospel, Irish, and Breton music).

== Career ==
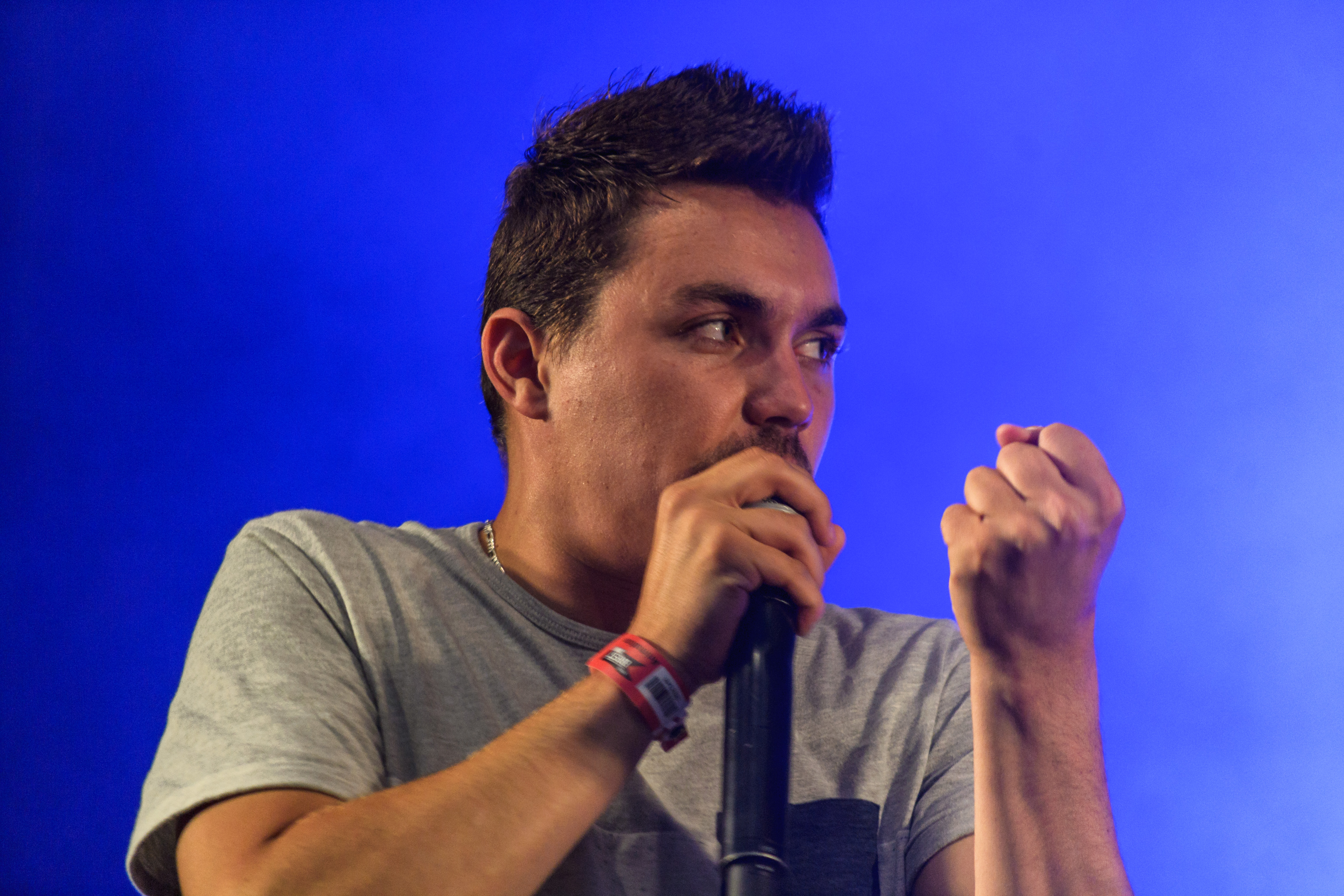
Alem - Male World Champion 2015

In October 2009, Alem competed at his first beatbox competition at the French Beatbox Championship. In the round of 16, his first ever battle, he won against Beasty. He lost to Dawan Player in the quarter-finals. In the 2010 French Beatbox Championship, Alem finished as runner-up, losing to Beasty. Alem was knocked out at the quarter final of the 2011 French Beatbox Championship, after losing to BMG.

In 2015, Alem became the first French World Champion in the Men's Solo Category, as well as, Tag Team Champion with beatbox partner, BMG.

In 2018, Alem and female solo Champion, Kaila Mullady, both entered the 5th Beatbox Battle World Championships, marking the first time a World Champion has attempted to defend their title in a consecutive World Championship. Alem was defeated by B-Art in the Top 8 battles.

In 2019, Alem and newly crowned World Champion, Alexinho, formed a tag team and entered into the Grand Beatbox Battle as Uniteam. They went on to win the competition defeating Middle School in the final.

In 2021, Alem secured the 7th spot of the Grand Beatbox Battle solo wildcard, earning him a place in the competition.

== Musical style ==
His style generally involves complex, intricate drum patterns and precise rhythms whilst simultaneously maintaining clarity of sound. He has often cited Kenny Muhammad, as one of his primary early beatboxing influences.

== Achievements ==
Years	Competitions	Held	Result	Notes	Ref.
2009	French Beatbox Championship	Toulouse, France	Quarter-Final	Men solo	
2010	French Beatbox Championship	Le Mans, France	2	Men solo	
2010	Beatbox Battle Maurepas	Maurepas, France	1	Men solo	
2011	Beatbox Battle Maurepas	Maurepas, France	1	Men solo	
2011	French Beatbox Championship	Lille, France	Semi-final	Men solo	
2012	Beatbox Battle World Championship	Berlin, Germany	2	Men solo	
2013	Grand Beatbox Battle	Basel, Switzerland	2	Solo	
2013	French Beatbox Championship	Lyon, France	1	Men solo	
2013	French Beatbox Championship	Lyon, France	1	Tag Team (with BMG as Twenteam8)	
2015	Beatbox Battle World Championship	Berlin, Germany	1	Men solo	
2015	Beatbox Battle World Championship	Berlin, Germany	1	Tag Team (with BMG as Twenteam8)	
2015	Grand Beatbox Battle	Basel, Switzerland	1	7ToSmoke	
2017	World Beatbox Camp	Krakow, Poland	2	Tag Team (with Kenny Urban as L.I.A.F)	
2018	Beatbox Battle World Championship	Berlin, Germany	Quarter-final	Men solo	
2019	Grand Beatbox Battle	Warsaw, Poland	1	Tag Team (with Alexinho as Uniteam)	
2021	Grand Beatbox Battle	Warsaw, Poland	Quarter-final	Solo	

== Discography ==
=== Albums ===
- Bogota Airport (2019)
- Christmas Songs & Beatbox (2020)
- Pause (2021)
