= Berywam =

French beatbox crew

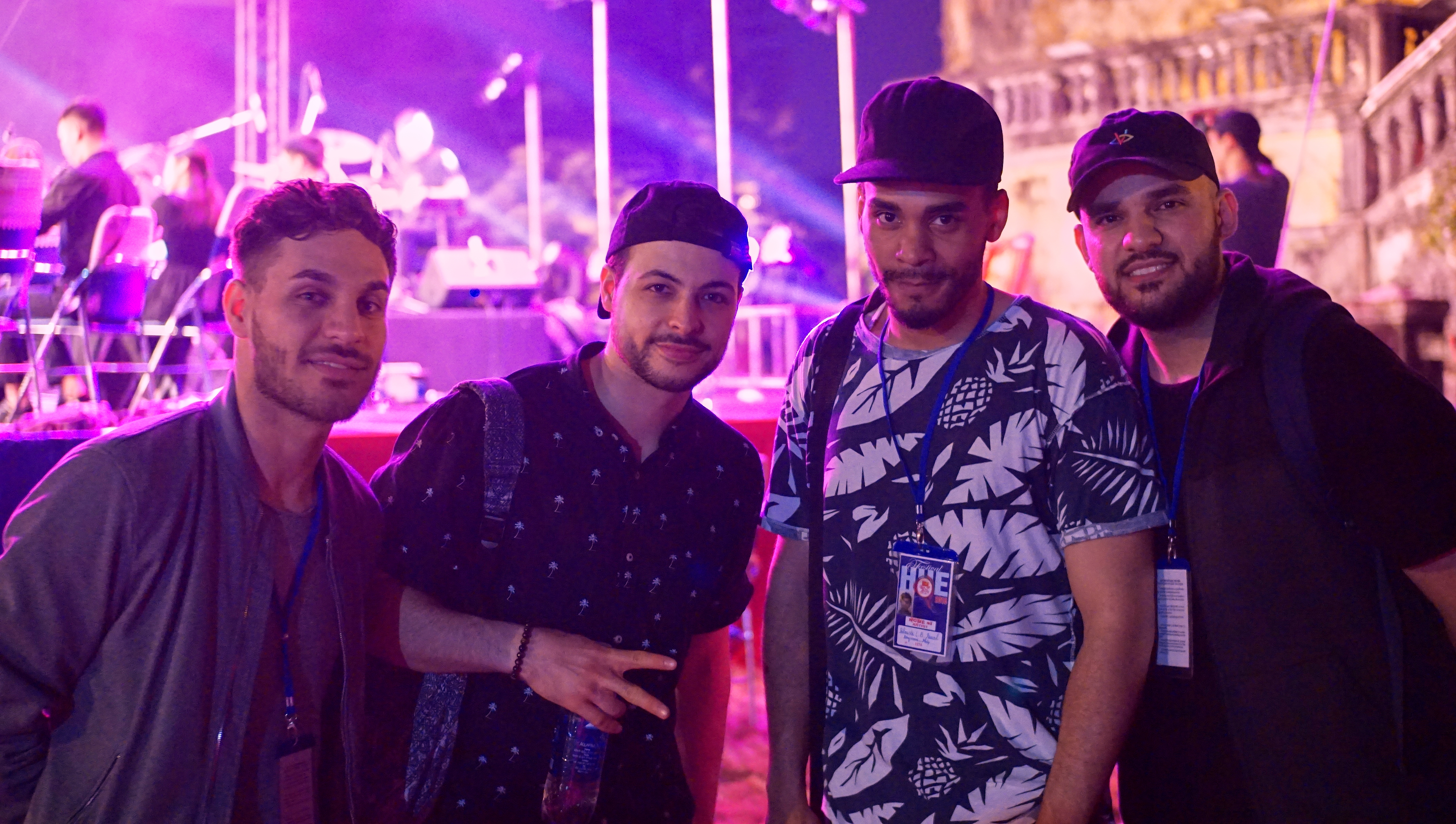
- Berywam on stage, during the Hue Festival 2018 in Vietnam (from left side to right : Rythmind, Beatness, Beasty and Wawad)

Background information
- Origin: Toulouse, France
- Genre: Beatboxing
- Years active: 2015–present
- Label: Barclay Records
- Members: Beatness; Rythmind; Wawad; Beasty
- Past members: MB14

Berywam is a French beatbox crew based in Toulouse, France. They won the French Beatbox Championship 2016. Their EP was released on 2 June 2017. They also won the Beatbox Battle World Championship 2018 in crew category.

== Career ==
=== 2015–2016: Formation crew and debut ===
Berywam was formed in 2015 to the surprise of everyone during the French Beatbox Championship. The name of the band is composed with the first letters of each original member (BE-RY-WA-M). Despite being defeated by Team Punk in 2015, they won the French beatbox championship team category in 2016 and qualified for the 2018 World Beatbox Championship. Berywam became popular on the internet for their beatbox covers posted on various social media websites.

=== 2017–2019: Tú sí que vales, tour concert, line changes-up, America's Got Talent ===
2017 was a turning point for the band as they began a tour across the France in April and finished with a summer tour until August. They released their EP on 2 June 2017, after signing a contract with Barclay Records. They opened for several well known artists' gigs like Bigflo & Oli and Georgio. They ended their year strong, taking part in the Italian TV talent show Tú sí que vales. It was a success for the band, being eliminated only after reaching the finals.

They began 2018 by announcing two gigs: one in Paris in April and the other in Toulouse in February. Both concerts were sold out one month in advance. Stemming from their success that came from the two gigs, the band announced two more gigs in the same cities in September in Paris, and in October in Toulouse. They were also invited to one of the most famous French music festivals, Les Francofolies de La Rochelle.

2018 was a crucial year for the band as they prepared for their first album and the 5th Beatbox Battle World Championship.On 9 April 2018, Berywam published on their YouTube channel a video explaining that MB14 decided to leave the band to pursue his solo career. On 20 April 2018, the crew announced in another YouTube video that Beasty, winner of the 2010 French Beatbox Championship, was chosen as the new member of the crew. At the World Championships that year, Berywam (composed of the current members along with MB14), became world champions in the "Crew" category.

Berywam continued their talent show appearances by participating in the 14th season of America's Got Talent, broadcast on the NBC channel. Their first participation was broadcast on 18–19 June 2019. Following the latter, they managed to climb to the second round of show. Berywam successfully passed the second round but were unsuccessful in progressing to the semi-finals.

=== 2020–present: Upcoming album and new projects ===
At the start of 2020, the group announced they would be creating an album set for release in 2021. On 24 January 2020, Berywam released on YouTube and several streaming platforms "Beriddim", their first single song. On 24 July 2020, Berywam released the second single song "Pacifique" on streaming music platforms and YouTube. In December 2020, Berywam released the first episode of a new concept called 'No Instrument'. This is a series where the group shed light on the creative process used for the formation of their upcoming album. The concept involves producing a complete track in the space of 3 hours, the genre of the track being chosen by ballot. So far they have launched 2 Reggaeton hits, 1 Brazilian trap and 1 Western trap. On 30 April 2021, the group released the single "Give It Up". Later, on 16 July 2021, the group released the single named "Beginning", remake from their trap routine. Composer's credit also goes to MB14, the one who made this melody famous. On 8 April 2022, Berywam released their first album "No instrument" on streaming platforms and YouTube.

== Members ==
=== Current members ===
The group is composed of four beatboxers, each having their own speciality: Beatness, Rythmind, Wawad and Beasty. They won together the 2016 French Beatbox Championship and the 2018 Beatbox Battle World Championship in the Team category.

- Beatness (real name: Fabian Quézac), born 20 September 1993, from Toulouse, is the bass voice of the band on most of their tracks. As a part of their duo Fabulous Wadness, Beatness and his partner Wawad won the 2014 French Beatbox Championship and the 2016 Grand Beatbox Battle in Tag Team category. They also claimed fourth place during the 2015 World Beatbox Championship. He formed another duo with Rythmind called Bery. They won the 2017 French Beatbox Championship and the First World Beatbox Camp in the Tag Team category. Bery also reached the semi-finals of the World Beatbox Championship and Grand Beatbox Battle in 2018 in the Tag Team category. He won the 2018 Grand Beatbox Battle in Loopstation category beating Balance in the final. He participated in GBB 2019 but lost to SO-SO in the quarter-finals.
- Rythmind (real name: Loїc Barcourt), born 19 September 1988, from Saint-Raphaël, mainly deals with the rhythm part and percussion. He regularly participates in the 7 to Smoke Battle organized during the Grand Beatbox Battle weekend and was also selected for the solo category in 2018 but did not pass the eliminations. In 2017, he won the French Championships with Beatness against the tag team Oniisan, and the first World Beatbox Camp Tag Team battle beating L.I.A.F. Rythmind also managed to reach the semi-finals of the French Solo Beatbox Championship, in 2014 where he lost against Wawad and in 2015 was bested by BMG. He succeeded in 2018 in obtaining a wildcard allowing him to participate in the next Beatbox Battle World Championship in Berlin in the Loopstation category. Rythmind did not manage to pass the qualifications in this category but he made it to the semi-finals in the Tag Team category with Beatness. In April 2019, Rythmind participated in the Grand Beatbox Battle in the Loopstation category. He beat the Italian NME with 3 votes to 2 in the final, thus winning his first major solo title.
- Wawad (real name: Walid Baali), born 24 August 1990, from Toulouse, is specialized in the musicality part and is often called as the human Trumpet of Berywam. He is considered as a master of click by his peers. He has one of the most impressive record in the French beatbox community. He won the French Beatbox Championship in Tag team category, the 2016 Grand Beatbox Battle as part of Fabulous Wadness, and was the Solo French Beatbox Champion in 2014 beating Alexinho, and 2016 beating BMG. He also reached the Top 16 in the solo category of the 2015 and 2018 editions of the Beatbox Battle World Championship.
- Beasty (real name: Loїc Palmiste), born 15 June 1989, from Bordeaux, joined the group in April 2018. He won the Solo French Beatbox Championship in 2010 by beating Alem in the final. He reached the Top 8 at the 3rd Beatbox Battle World Championship in 2012, but was beaten by Skiller (who was the eventual winner of this edition of the competition). Beasty also participated with France in La Cup in 2013, where they reached the final but were beaten by Germany. Beasty is also known on YouTube thanks to his participation in a TEDxBordeaux conference performing beatbox, his video exceeded 4 million views as of 2020.

=== Former member ===
- MB14 (real name: Mohamed Belkhir), born June 19, 1994, from Amiens, was well known in the band for his voice and his dynamic instrument impressions. He became known in France after he reached the finals in the TV show The Voice: la plus belle voix in 2016. He reached the semi-finals of the Grand Beatbox Battle in 2015, 2016 and 2017 in the loopstation category. He also reached the semi-finals of the 2016 French Beatbox Championship and the quarter-finals of the 2018 French Beatbox Championship in the solo category. On 9 April 2018, in a video posted on Berywam's Facebook page, MB14 announced that he would be leaving the group but would stay on till they had finished all planned projects involving him. He stated the main reason for him wanting to leave was so that he could focus on his solo career. His final performance with the group was at the 5th World Beatbox Championships. Since departing from the group MB14 has since continued his career by acting as a judge for the Loopstation category at the Grand Beatbox Battle 2019 in Warsaw, Poland and reached the quarter-finals as a participant in the Solo category. He won his first solo competition at the 2019 Battle of the Year Beatbox Battle. In 2023, he auditioned on the sixteenth series of Britain's Got Talent. On his audition, he was given the Golden Buzzer by the shows host's, Ant & Dec. He was eliminated from the shows fourth semi-final vote, getting third place with 13.1% of the public vote.

== Discography ==
=== EP albums ===
Title	Album details
BERYWAM	Released: June 2, 2017; Label: Barclay, Universal Music Group; Formats: Digital download; Track listing: 1. Crazy; 2. Shape of You; 3. Hey Brother; 4. No Diggity

=== Albums ===
Title	Album details
No instrument	Released: April 8, 2022; Label: Barclay, Universal Music Group; Formats: Digital Download; Track listing: 1. Give It Up; 2. Get You; 3. Aller Pointer (feat. Féfé); 4. My Name; 5. Jungle; 6. Guili (feat. Willy William); 7. The Fifth (feat. Rahzel); 8. Down; 9. Plus Vite (feat. Bigflo & Oli); 10. Best; 11. Flow (feat. Shaggy); 12. Milky Way; 13. Beriddim; 14. Beginning

=== Singles ===
Title	Years	Album
"Pacifique"	2020	Non-album single
"Conmigo"	2020	Non-album single
"Your keys"	2020	Non-album single
"Boca"	2021	Non-album single
"The Bullet"	2021	Non-album single
