= Beatbox Battle World Championship =

International beatboxing event

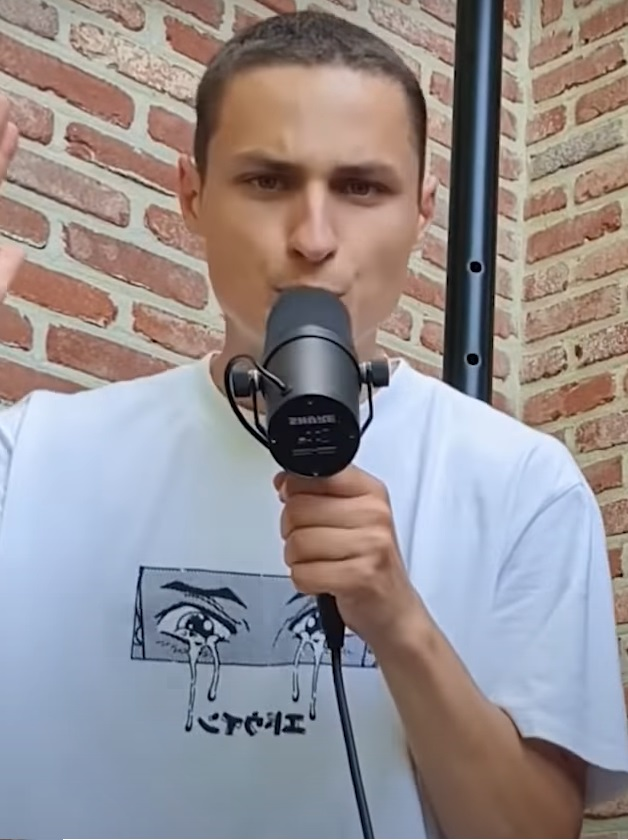
FootboxG - Male World Champion 2023

The Beatbox Battle World Championship (BBBWC) is hosted triennially (every three years) hosted by Beatbox Battle Tv in a week-long festival held in Berlin, Germany. Face-to-face beatbox battles take place in five categories:- individual male, individual female, tag-team, loop station and crew battle. In 2015, more than 150 national or major event champions of beatboxing gathered from 50 or so countries, after qualifying to participate in the world event by winning their respective national championships.

The sixth Beatbox Battle World Championship was held in Berlin, Germany from 2 to 6 August 2023. The women's battle has been reinstated. The tag-team, loop station and crew battle, also two new categories: Best new sound FX and Best vocal scratching.

== 2023 Qualifying (competitors list to 27 July 2023) ==
Men's Individual Competitors 2023
Europe
Austria	Cäspian
Austria	Euzn
Belgium	FootboxG
Belgium	G-Wizz
Belgium	Stan
Bulgaria	BassBro
Bulgaria	M1xx1ng
Bulgaria	MaxO
Bulgaria	Mgf
Cyprus	Kakerlake
Czech Republic	PJ
Denmark	Bozz
Denmark	Calexy
Denmark	S
England	ABH
England	Milky
France	Bookie Blanco
France	Pacmax
France	River
Germany	Madox
Greece	Mr. Ben
Greece	S-Dope
Ireland	
Israel	DeMellow
Israel	Elian
Italy	Azel
Italy	Jbeat
Italy	BlackRoll
Netherlands	Benja
Netherlands	SVM
Netherlands	Timmeh
Poland	Filip
Poland	Grooveson
Poland	Watome
Poland	Xankish
Portugal	MixFX
Portugal	Stalkrixx
Scotland	Undefined
Slovakia	Shoter
Slovakia	SahZu
Spain	Cobli
Spain	Manupe
Spain	Shadowless
Spain	Zekka
Spain	Zerpa
Sweden	DMB
Sweden	Flawapawa
Switzerland	Denis The Menace
Turkey	Lexomafo
Turkey	Soulz
Wales	Greycloud

Men's Individual Competitors 2023
North America
Canada	Den
Guatemala	Yess
Honduras	Yensel
Mexico	Ralik
Puerto Rico	Jonex
United States	Bloomer
United States	NaPom
United States	Pono
United States	Vocodah
-
South America
Argentina	Axel
Argentina	Hernion
Argentina	Niktef
Argentina	Phenom
Argentina	Sharkz
Brazil	Dudz
Colombia	Beatmeda
Colombia	Ordinal
Asia
Armenia	Sevan
China	3H
China	Krey
India	Jack beats
India	Sarthak Subudhi
Indonesia	Ego
Indonesia	Hookha
Jordan	Samer Awni
Malaysia	Stitch
Nepal	Aman Adhikari
Singapore	Varen
Sri Lanka	Julius Mitchell
South Korea	Huckle
Africa
Egypt	Seif Killa
Morocco	Fabley
Tunisia	Apocalips
Tunisia	ZigZap
Oceana
New Zealand	Crkzu
-
-

Crew Competitors 2023
Armenia	FlowGuardz
Austria	MOM
France	Kowler Rangers
India	Desible
Italy	Meelky
-

Women's Individual Competitors 2023
Argentina	Gamuz
Belgium	Romy
Bulgaria	Pe4enkata
France	LadyAngel
France	Dana Anderson
France	Prichia
France	Tressym
Italy	Paradox
Italy	Satana
Japan	Kiyo
Japan	Na-Na
Spain	Bask
Spain	Juls
Tunisia	Damkina
United States	Solar Flare
-
-

. .

Tag Team 2023
Colombia	A&M
Austria	Beat Junkies
Austria	Tummelplatz
(Germany) Ger	Big Buddah Cheese
Armenia	Bizzaro
Italy	Black Jack
Spain	Choripan
Spain	La caja de Meeseeks
Spain	Two Brothers
Portugal	Combosure
India	Deliverance
China	Double Kill
(United States) U.S	DreamerZ
Israel	E.L.R
Poland	Enjoy
Poland	Lo-Fi
Poland	NiceGuys
Tunisia	Evilution
France	Fresh tonic
France	ZenHit
Greece	Horbeatz
Malaysia	Pahlawan
Ireland	SomeClop
Taiwan	WingSail
Scotland	YeahNo

== History ==
The first ever Beatbox Battle World Championship was started in 2005 by Alexander "BeeLow" Bülow and took place in 2005 in Leipzig, Germany. The event was the first international beatboxing championship.

The second Beatbox Battle World Championship, took place at the 2BE Club am Hauptbahnhof near Berlin-Central Station in 2009.

The 3rd BBBWC in 2012, the 4th in 2015 and the 5th in 2018 were held at the Astra Kulturhaus in Friedrichshain-Kreuzberg, Berlin. In 2012, over 1000 people attended the event and over 100,000 people viewed the event live online.

In 2018, more than 150 artists from 6 continents and 50 countries qualified for the event, including musicians from Argentina, Australia, Brazil, Canada, Chile, China, Colombia, Ecuador, Indonesia, Japan, Malaysia, Mexico, Morocco, New Zealand, Peru, Philippines, Singapore, Venezuela, Vietnam, South Africa, Russia, South Korea, Taiwan, United States, + 26 European countries were invited to perform in front of around 1,500 spectators.

== Event format and qualification ==
All competitors have had to qualify for the Beatbox Battle World Championship by winning their national Beatbox Battle championships, or having reached the knock-out stages of the previous Beatbox Battle World Championship, wildcard or special invitation. In the first round, each performer has two minutes time to demonstrate their skills to an international panel of elite judges from the beatboxing world, (such as Reeps One of England) and previous world champions from this tournament, to decide which performers qualify for the Knock-out rounds that are contested in ‘battle mode’ to determine the world champion. The judges base their decision on musicality, technicality, originality, pattern and show quality on the stage.

== BBBWC Gallery ==
BBBWC Individual World Champions Gallery

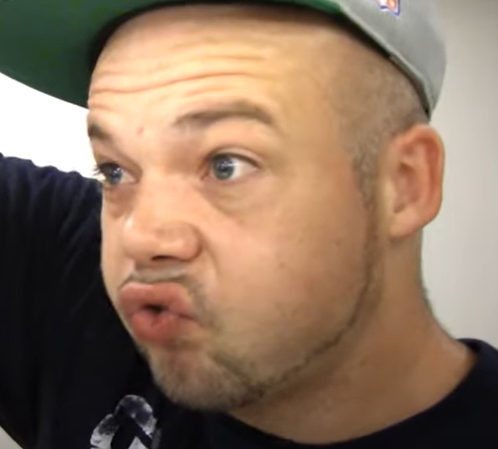
Joel Turner 2005

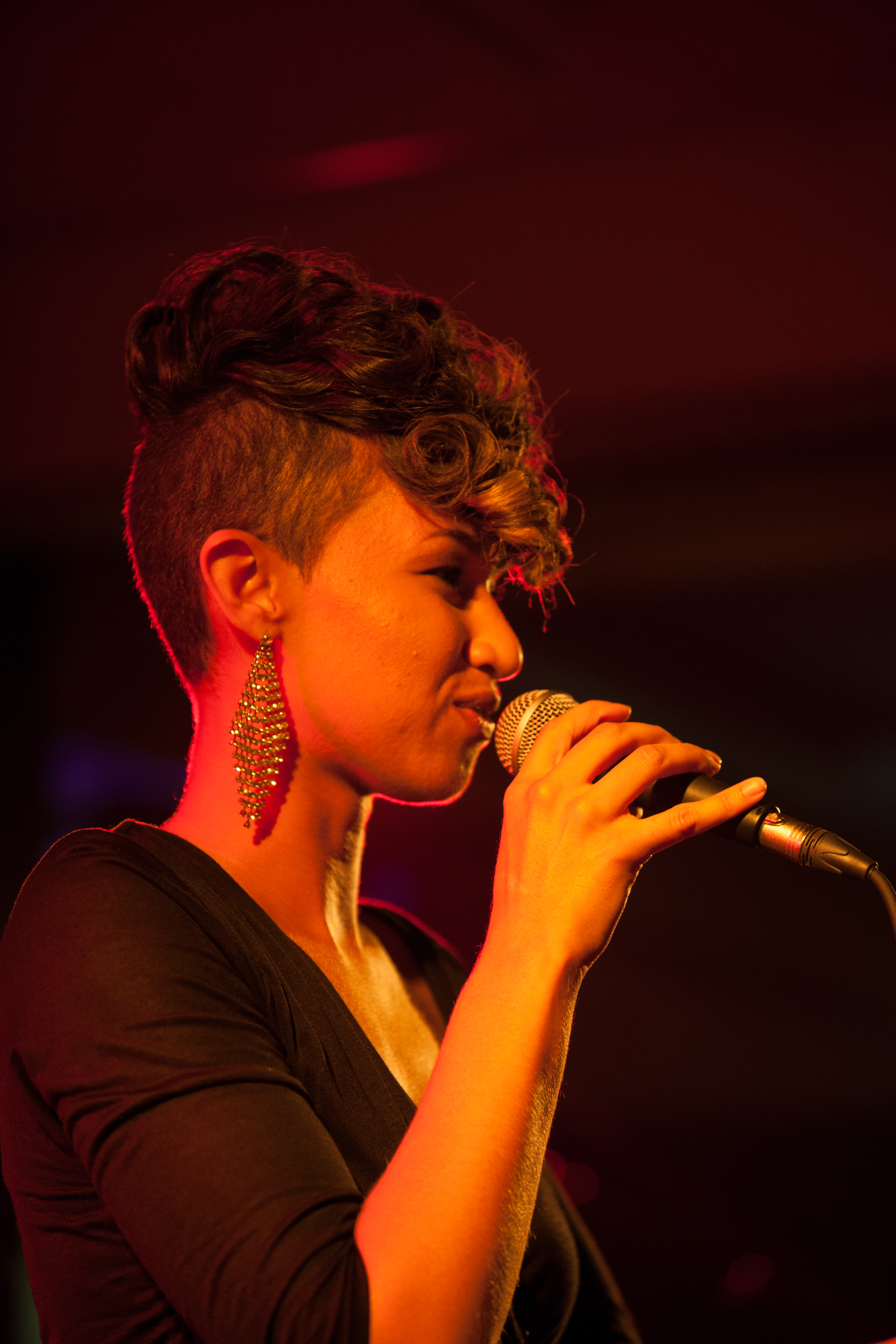
Butterscotch 2005

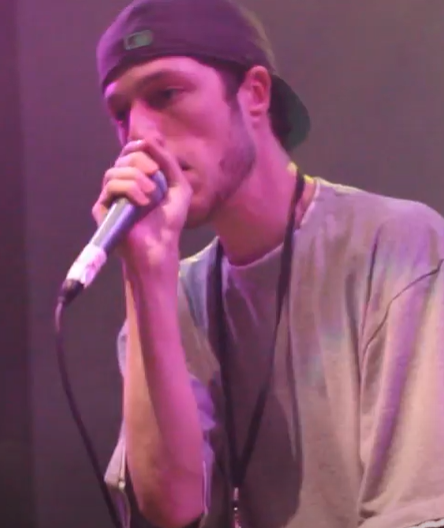
ZeDe 2009

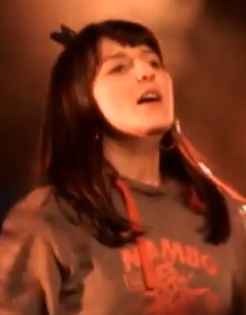
Bellatrix 2009

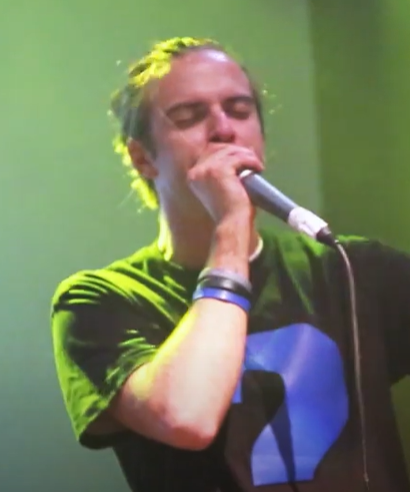
SkilleR 2012

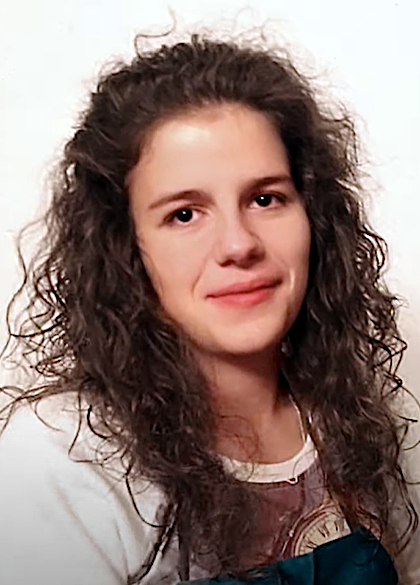
Pe4enkata 2012 + 2023

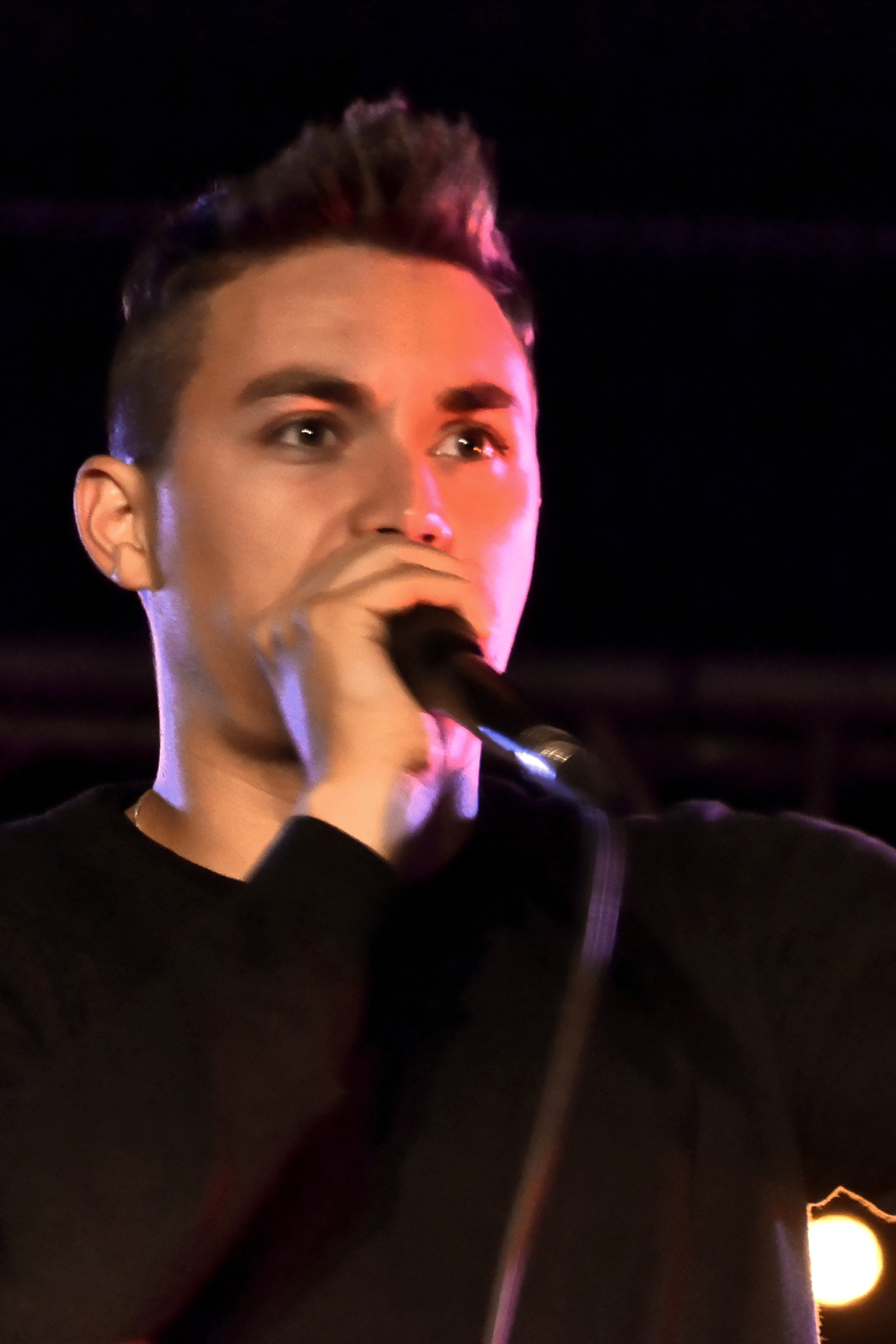
Alem 2015

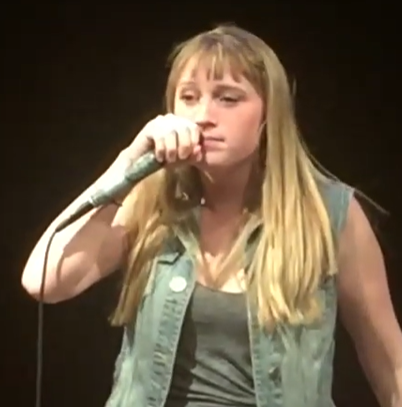
Kaila Mullady 2015 and 2018

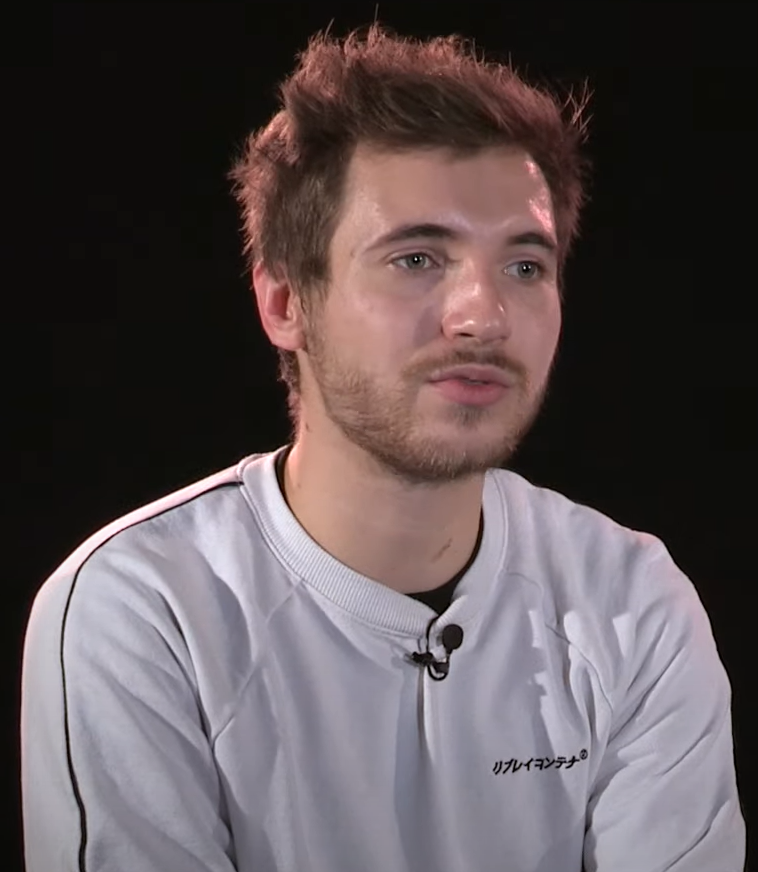
Alexinho 2018

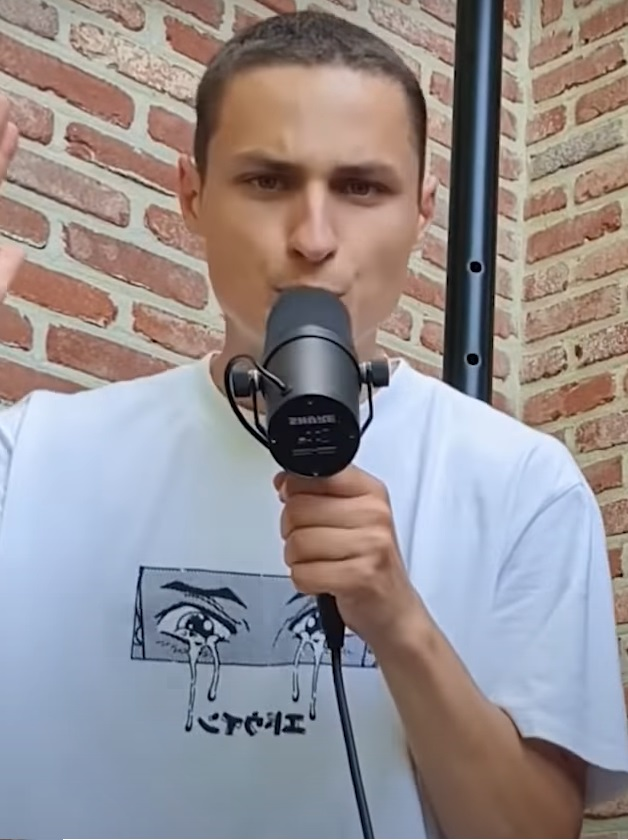
FootboxG 2023

== BBBWC results ==
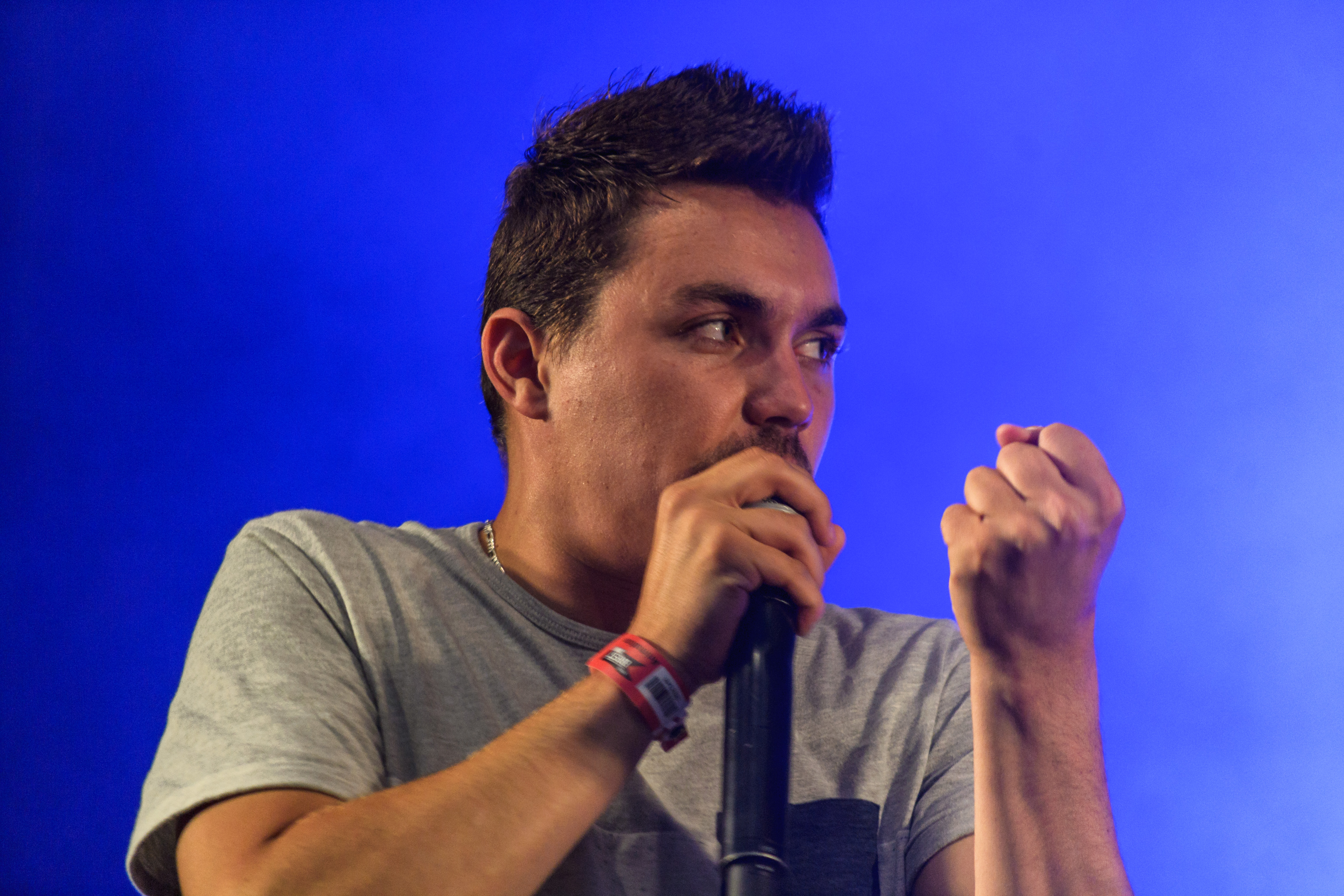
Alem - Male World Champion 2015

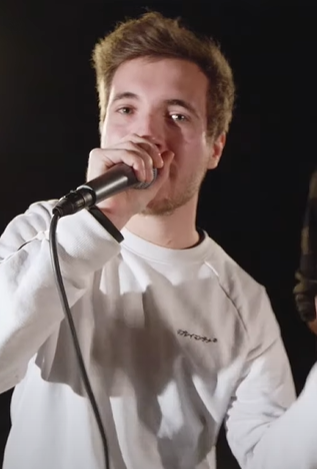
Alexinho - Male World Champion 2018

Individual Male
Edition	Year	Venue	Champion	Vice Champion	Reference
1st BBBWC	2005	Kohlrabizirkus, Leipzig, Germany	(Australia) Joel Turner	(Belgium) RoxorLoops (Senjka Danhieux)	
2nd BBBWC	2009	2BE Club, Berlin Hauptbahnhof, Germany	(Switzerland) ZeDe (Joel Marian)	(Russia) Vahtang (Vahtang Kalandadze)	
3rd BBBWC	2012	Astra Kulturhaus, Berlin	(Bulgaria) SkilleR (Alexander Deyanov)	(France) Alem (Maël Gayaud)	
4th BBBWC	2015	Astra Kulturhaus, Berlin	(France) Alem (Maël Gayaud)	(United States) NaPoM (Neil Meadows)	
5th BBBWC	2018	Astra Kulturhaus, Berlin	(France) Alexinho (Alexis Grimaud)	(Netherlands) B-Art (Bart Voogt)	
6th BBBWC	2023	Neue Welt, Neukölln, Berlin	(Belgium) Footbox G (Tim Van Droogenbroeck)	(France) PACMax (Max Ostrowska)	

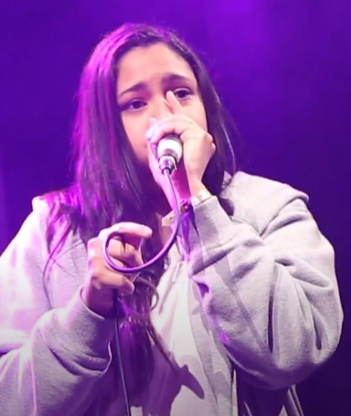
Flashbox - Female Vice Champion in 2012

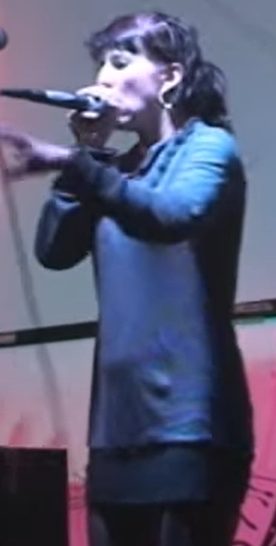
Bellatrix - Female World Champion in 2009

Individual Female
Edition	Year	Venue	Champion	Vice Champion	Reference
1st BBBWC	2005	Kohlrabizirkus, Leipzig, Germany	(United States) Butterscotch (Antoinette Clinton)	(Switzerland) Evangeli	
2nd BBBWC	2009	2BE Club, Berlin Hauptbahnhof, Germany	(United Kingdom) Bellatrix (Isabel Ehresmann)	(Switzerland) Steff la Cheffe (Stefanie Peter)	
3rd BBBWC	2012	Astra Kulturhaus, Berlin	(Bulgaria) Pe4enkata (Adriana Nikolova)	(France) Flashbox	
4th BBBWC	2015	Astra Kulturhaus, Berlin	(United States) Kaila (Kaila Mullady)	(Canada) Sparx (Emilie Carrey)	
5th BBBWC	2018	Astra Kulturhaus, Berlin	(United States) Kaila (Kaila Mullady)	(Poland) Chiwawa (Karolina Olech)	
6th BBBWC	2023	Neue Welt, Neukölln, Berlin	(Bulgaria) Pe4enkata (Adriana Nikolova)	(France) Prichia (Inês Abreu Pinho Tavares)	

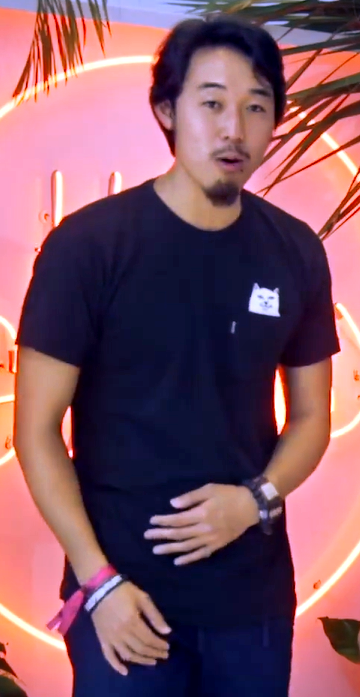
Gene Shinozaki from "Spider Horse" Tag Team World Champions 2018

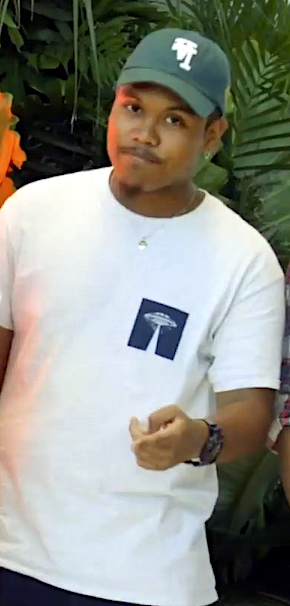
Chris Celiz from "Spider Horse" Tag Team World Champions 2018

Tag Team
Edition	Year	Venue	Champions	Vice Champions	Reference
1st BBBWC	2005	Kohlrabizirkus, Leipzig, Germany	(Australia) Attention Deficit Disaudio (Joel Turner, Tom Thum)	(Germany) 4xSample; (Chrlorophill and Mando): (Belgium) Beatoxic; (RoxorLoops, Copycat and Karen)	
4th BBBWC	2015	Astra Kulturhaus, Berlin	(France) Twenteam’8 (Alem and BMG)	(Germany) 4xSample (Chrlorophill and Mando)	
5th BBBWC	2018	Astra Kulturhaus, Berlin	(United States) Spider Horse (Gene Shinozaki and Chris Celiz)	(Russia) Mad Twinz (Jayton and Pash)	
6th BBBWC	2023	Neue Welt, Neukölln, Berlin	(France) Zen'Hit (kenôzen and Akindé)	(Spain) Choripan (Gako and Juano)	

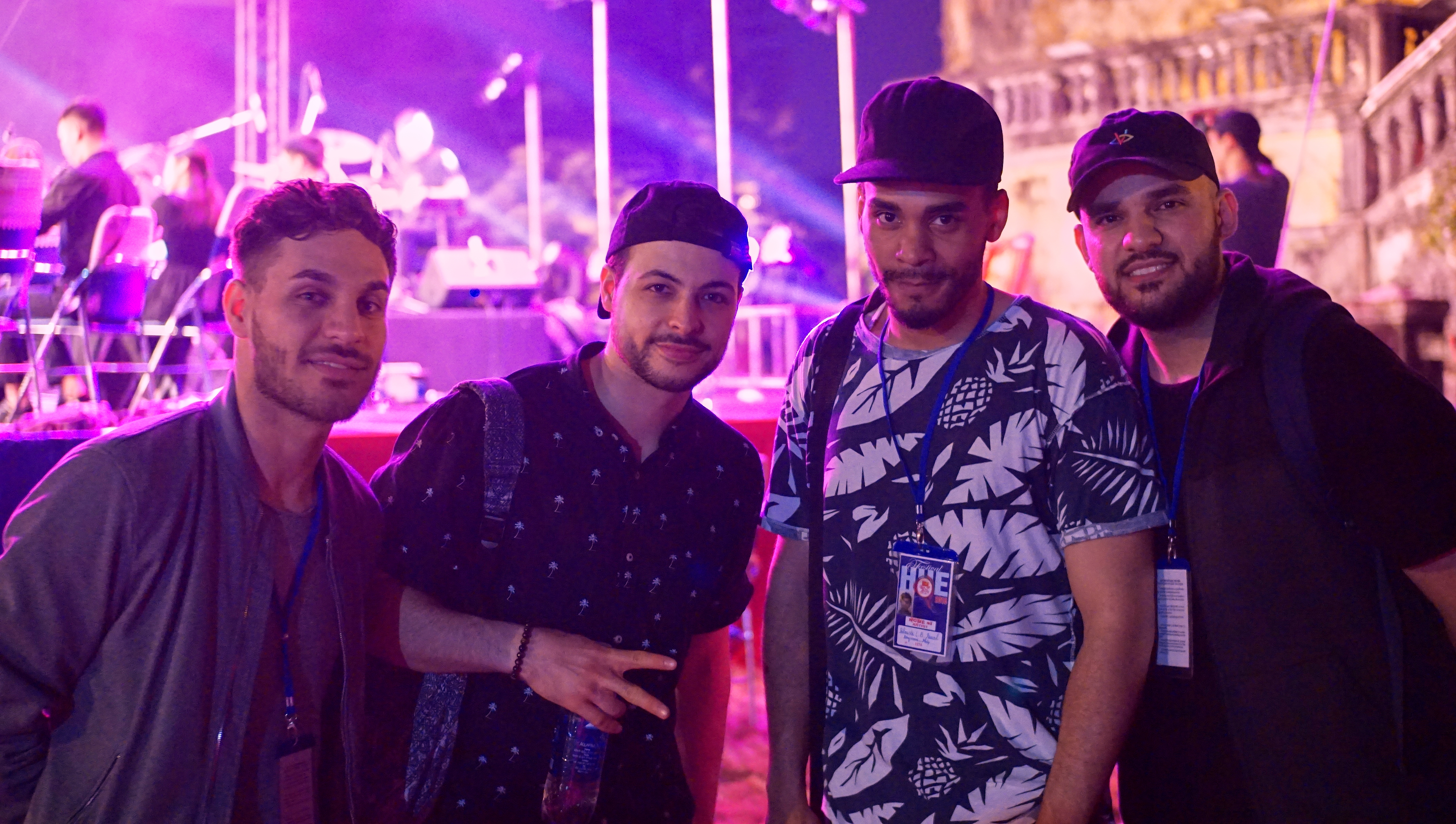
Berywam (Wawad, Beatness, Rythmind, Beasty) Crew World Champions 2018

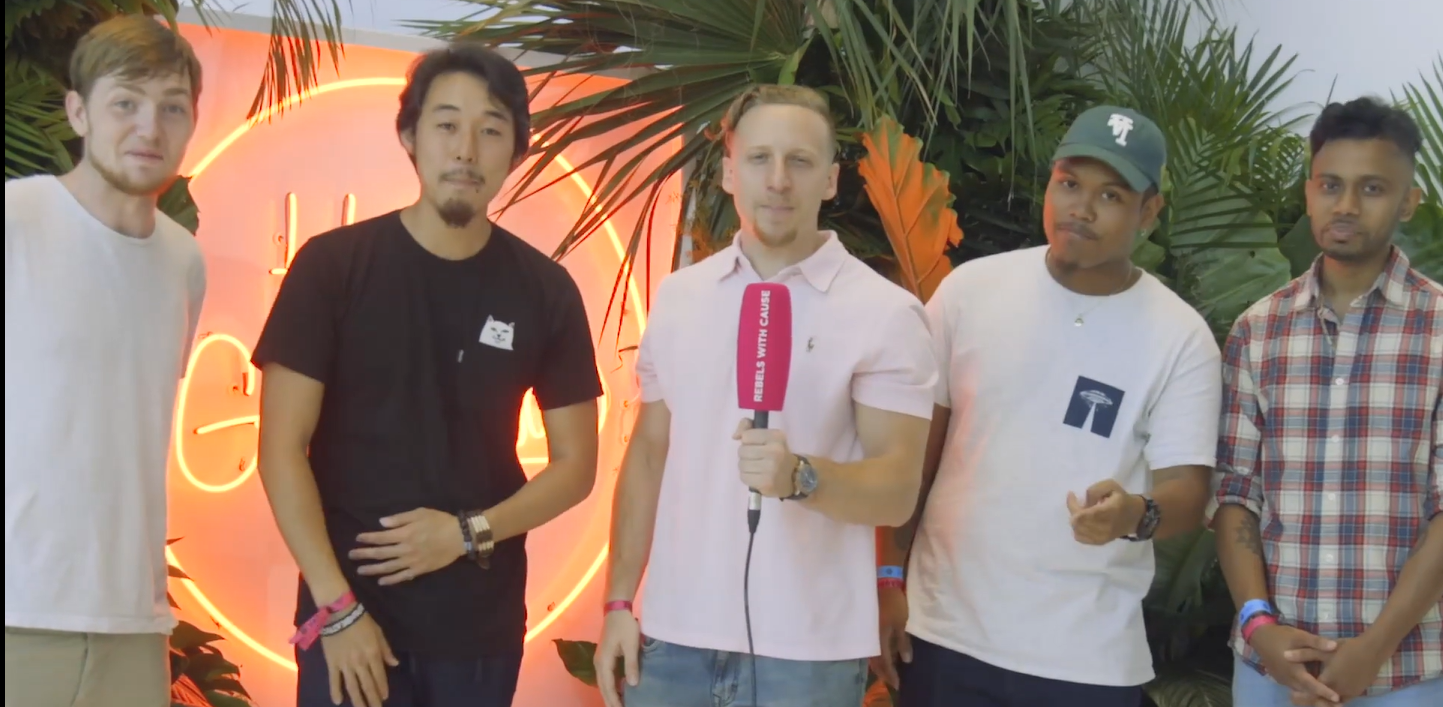
Beatbox House - Crew Vice Champions in 2018

Crew
Edition	Year	Venue	Champions	Vice Champions	Reference
2nd BBBWC	2009	2BE Club, Berlin Hauptbahnhof, Germany	(France) Under Kontrol (Micflow, Mr Lips, Tiko, Faya Braz)	(Czech Republic) Beatburger Band (Jaro Cossiga, Nasty, Johny Typek, En.dru, Ivan Hoe)	
4th BBBWC	2015	Astra Kulturhaus, Berlin	(England) Beatbox Collective (Ball-Zee, Bass6, Bellatrix, BFG, Experimental, Hobbit)	(France) Under Kontrol (Micflow, Mr Lips, Tiko, Faya Braz)	
5th BBBWC	2018	Astra Kulturhaus, Berlin	(France) Berywam (MB14, Wawad, Beatness, Rythmind, Beasty)	(United States) Beatbox House (Neil "NaPoM" Meadows, Gene Shinozaki, Kenny Urban, Amit Bhowmick, Chris Celiz)	
6th BBBWC	2023	Neue Welt, Neukölln, Berlin	(Austria) M.O.M (EON, Geo Popoff, Slizzer)	(France) Kowler Rangers (Epock, Osy, Tunecinoo, Aelmight)	

Loopstation
Edition	Year	Venue	Champions	Vice Champions	Reference
5th BBBWC	2018	Astra Kulturhaus, Berlin	(France) Saro (Tristan Coudray)	(Russia) Inkie (Yuri Obukhov)	
6th BBBWC	2023	Neue Welt, Neukölln, Berlin	(United States) 808Banon (Canon Morgan)	(Belgium) Yaswede (Ilya de Swerdt)	

Best new sound FX
Edition	Year	Venue	Champions	Vice Champions	Reference
6th BBBWC	2023	Neue Welt, Neukölln, Berlin	(Mexico) Bass	Spain	

Best Vocal Scratching
Edition	Year	Venue	Champions	Vice Champions	Reference
6th BBBWC	2023	Neue Welt, Neukölln, Berlin	(Madagascar) Do-B	(France) O'Slim	

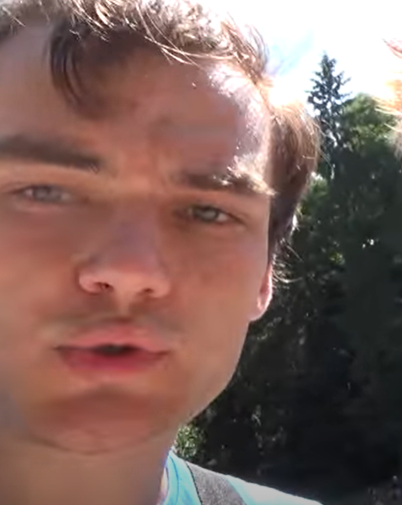
B-Art - Male Runner-up 2018

== Archived history ==
=== Qualifying history BBBWC 2018 ===
Male
Country	Name	Classifications
Europe
(France)	Alem	BBBWC World Champion 2015
(France)	Alexinho	French Beatbox Champion 2015
(France)	BMG	BBBWC World Champion 2015
(France)	Colaps	French Beatbox Champion 2017
(France)	Efaybee	BBBWC World Champion 2015
(France)	K.I.M	BBBWC World Champion 2012
(France)	Wawad	French Beatbox Champion 2014 & 2016
(Republic of Ireland)	Ameron	Irish Beatbox Champion 2015
(Republic of Ireland)	Magic	Irish Beatbox Champion 2017
(Germany)	Babeli	German Beatbox Champion 2011-2012
(Germany)	Chezame	German Beatbox Champion 2017
(Germany)	Madox	German Beatbox Champion 2018
(Germany)	Robeat	BBBWC World Champion 2009
(Belgium)	BigBen	BBBWC World Champion 2015
(Belgium)	FootboxG	Belgium Beatbox Champion 2018
(Belgium)	Supernova	Belgium Beatbox Champion 2016
(Netherlands)	B-Art	Netherlands Beatbox Champion 2014 & 2016
(Netherlands)	Ibarra	Netherlands Beatbox Champion 2017
(Bulgaria)	Bass bro	Bulgarian Beatbox Champion 2018
(Bulgaria)	KillaBee	Bulgarian Beatbox Champion 2016
(Bulgaria)	MaxO	Bulgarian Beatbox Champion 2017
(Denmark)	Blue Lipy	Danish Beatbox Champion 2013-2015
(Denmark)	Rawclaw	Danish Beatbox Champion 2017
(Poland)	Bobby	Polish Beatbox Champion 2017
(Poland)	Carlo	Polish Beatbox Champion 2015
(Poland)	Mic Bandit	Polish Beatbox Champion 2017
(Poland)	Zorak 3000	BBBWC World Champion 2009
(United Kingdom)	Contrix	UK Beatbox Champion 2015
(United Kingdom)	Frosty	UK Beatbox Champion 2017
(United Kingdom)	D-Low	UK Beatbox Champion 2016
(Wales)	Greycloud	Welsh Beatbox Champion 2016
(Wales)	Jomez	Welsh Beatbox Champion 2017
(Romania)	Cosmin	Romanian Beatbox Champion
(Switzerland)	Denis the menace	Swiss Beatbox Champion 2017-2018
(Austria)	Eon	Austrian Beatbox Champion 2013 & 2016
(Austria)	Euzn	Austrian Beatbox Champion 2018
(Austria)	Fredbull	Austrian Beatbox Champion 2015
(Austria)	Mitro	Austrian Beatbox Champion 2017
(Austria)	Geo Popoff	Austrian Beatbox Champion 2015 & 2019
(Ukraine)	Fenya	Ukrainian Beatbox Champion 2017
(Ukraine)	Kaniflow	Ukrainian Beatbox Champion 2017
(Spain)	Fredy Beats	Spanish Beatbox Champion 2015-2016
(Spain)	Zekka	Spanish Beatbox Champion 2017
(Sweden)	Gneben	Swedish Beatbox Champion 2017
(Russia)	Jayton	Russian Beatbox Champion 2015
(Russia)	Pash	Russian Beatbox Champion 2015
(Russia)	Outcheck	Russian Beatbox Champion 2015
(Russia)	Pizzicato	Russian Beatbox Champion 2016
(Slovakia)	Kulprate	Slovak Beatbox Champion 2016
(Slovakia)	Shoter	Slovak Beatbox Champion 2017
(Lithuania)	Matufa	Lithuanian Beatbox Champion 2016
(Lithuania)	SlyGrid	Lithuanian Beatbox Champion 2015
(Slovenia)	Nick	Slovenian Beatbox Champion 2017
(Greece)	S-Dope	Greek Beatbox Champion 2017
(Armenia)	Sevan	Armenian Beatbox Champion 2017-2018
(Armenia)	Shady	Armenian Beatbox Champion 2016
(Luxembourg)	Slizzer	BBBWC World Champion 2015
(Czech Republic)	Tiny Beat	Czech Beatbox Champion 2016
North America
(United States)	Audical	Wildcard Winner 2018
(United States)	Mark Martin	American Beatbox Champion 2016
(United States)	Gene	2015 BBBWC QF
(United States)	Kenny Urban	GBBB Champion 2016
(United States)	NaPoM	BBBWC Vice Champion 2015
(United States)	Wunknown	American Beatbox Champion 2017
(Canada)	BBK	Canadian Champion 2014, 2015
(Canada)	HeAt	Canadian Champion 2016
(Canada)	Elisii	Canadian Champion 2017
(Mexico)	BASS	Mexican Champion 2018
(El Salvador)	BeatG	Salvadorian Champion 2017
(Puerto Rico)	Black Rhythm	Puerto Rico Champion 2016
South America
(Uruguay)	Batman	Uruguayan Champion 2015
(Uruguay)	Fabulous	Uruguayan Champion 2017
(Chile)	Ex-BiTT	Chilean Champion 2016
(Chile)	Mr.Androide	Latin American Champion 2017
(Chile)	Onetime	Chilean Champion 2015
(Chile)	Waali	Chilean Champion 2017
(Argentina)	Phenom	Argentinian Champion 2017
(Colombia)	Znowsz	Colombian Champion 2018
Asia
(Hong Kong)	3H	Hongkong Champion 2016, 2017
(Hong Kong)	Heartgrey	Hongkong Champion 2012, 2015, 2016
(Taiwan)	JER	Taiwanese Champion 2018
(Taiwan)	Jimix	Taiwanese Champion 2011-2014 + 2016
(China)	Zhang Ze	Chinese Champion 2014, 2015 & 2016.
(Japan)	Bataco	Asian Champion 2017
(Japan)	Ettoman	Japanese Champion 2017
(Japan)	Kairi	Japanese Champion 2015
(Japan)	Tatsuaki	Japanese Champion 2016
(South Korea)	H Has	South Korean Champion 2015
(South Korea)	Hiss	South Korean Champion 2018
(South Korea)	Two H	South Korean Champion 2010
(South Korea)	WinG	South Korean Champion 2017
(Vietnam)	Austin	Vietnamese Champion 2018
(Vietnam)	Trung Bao	
(India)	Azazel	Indian Champion 2017
(Jordan)	Fahed	Jordanian Champion 2015, 2016, 2017
(Azerbaijan)	Zer0	Azerbaijan Champion 2014
(Singapore)	Piratheeban	Singapore Champion 2016, Asian Champion 2016
(Indonesia)	Ego	Indonesian Champion 2015
(Philippines)	Vincent	Philippines Champion 2018
Oceania
(Australia)	CLR	Australian Champion 2016
(Australia)	Codfish	Australian Champion 2017
(Australia)	Z-Man	Australian Champion 2015
(New Zealand)	Crkzu	New Zealand Champion 2017
Africa
(Egypt)	Demo	Egyptian Champion 2015
(Egypt)	FRK	Egyptian Champion 2017
(Morocco)	Double-M	Moroccoan Champion 2018

Female
Country	Name	Classifications
Europe
(France)	Flashbox	BBBWC Vice Champion 2012
(France)	Karlotta	French Champion 2017
(Poland)	Chiwawa	
(Poland)	Mystic	Polish Champion 2013
(Germany)	Bedsn Beats	
(Malta)	Dana McKeon	
(England)	J9	BBWC-QF 2015
(Italy)	LadyWake	Italian Champion 2013
North America
(United States)	HerShe	
(United States)	Kaila Mullady	BBBWC Champion 2015
(United States)	Verver	
(Canada)	Psyreine	
South America
(Argentina)	Gamuz	Argentinian Champion 2017
Asia
(China)	Nicky	
(Japan)	Kiyozo	
(Singapore)	E-Ling	
(Philippines)	Madibeats	
Africa
(Morocco)	Neomi	

== See also ==
- Breath Control: The History of the Human Beat Box
- Grand Beatbox Battle
- List of beatboxers
- Mouth drumming
- UK Beatbox Championships
