= Wings (disambiguation) =

Wings are appendages used to create lift.

Wings may also refer to:

== People ==
- Wings Hauser (born 1947), American actor
- Mary Wings (born 1949), American artist, writer and musician

== Entertainment ==
=== Films ===
- The Wings (film), a 1916 Swedish silent film
- Wings (1927 film), an American silent World War I film
- Wings (1966 film), a Soviet film by Larisa Shepitko
- Wings (2012 film), a Russian animated film

=== Literature ===
- Wings (Kuzmin novel), a 1906 novel by Mikhail Kuzmin
- Wings (Pike novel), a 2009 young-adult faerie novel by Aprilynne Pike
- Wings (Steel novel), a 1994 romance novel by Danielle Steel
- Wings (play), a 1978 Arthur Kopit play
  - Wings (musical), a 1992 musical based on the Kopit play
- Wings (Terry Pratchett novel), the third and final novel in The Nome Trilogy
- The Wings (novel), a 1936 novel by Yi Sang

=== Music ===
==== Groups ====
- Paul McCartney and Wings, a 1970s rock band
- Wings (1968 band), an American folk rock band
- Wings (duo), a South Korean duo
- Wings (Malaysian band), a rock kapak band

==== Albums ====
- Wings (Franco Ambrosetti album) (1984)
- Wings (BTS album) (2016)
- Wings (Mark Chesnutt album) (1995)
- Wings (Michael Johnson album) (1986)
- Wings (Paul McCartney and Wings album) (2025)
- Wings (Peter Kater album) (2019)
- Wings (Skylark album) (2006)
- Wings (Bonnie Tyler album) (2005)
- Wings (EP), by Koda Kumi (2023)
- Wings by Michel Colombier (1971)

==== Songs ====
- "Wings" (1927 film score), written by Ballard Macdonald and composed by J.S. Zamecnik
- "Wings" (Birdy song), 2013
- "Wings" (Polina Bogusevich song), 2017
- "Wings" (Delta Goodrem song), 2015
- "Wings" (Jonas Brothers song), 2023
- "Wings" (Little Mix song), 2012
- "Wings" (Macklemore & Ryan Lewis song), 2011
- "Wings" (Ringo Starr song), 1977
- "Wings", by Black Eyed Peas from Masters of the Sun Vol. 1
- "Wings", by Tim Buckley from Tim Buckley
- "Wings", by Eden from Vertigo
- "Wings", by Golden Earring from Just Earrings
- "Wings", by Haerts
- "Wings", by Live from Songs from Black Mountain
- "Wings", by Mac Miller from Swimming
- "Wings", by Red Velvet from Chill Kill
- "Wings", by Sentenced from North from Here
- "Wings", by Soulfly from Prophecy
- "Wings", by SZA from S

=== Periodicals ===
- Wings (Canadian magazine), a business and commercial aviation magazine
- Wings (Japanese magazine), a shōjo manga magazine published by Shinshokan
- Wings (US magazine), a magazine about the history of military aviation

=== Television ===
- Wings (1990 TV series), an American sitcom that aired on NBC from 1990 to 1997
- Wings (1988 TV series), a 1988 American documentary program on the Discovery Channel
- Wings (1977 TV series), a 1977–1978 British drama series that aired on BBC
- "Wings", an episode of The Protector

=== Video games ===
- Wings (1990 video game), a World War I computer flying game by Cinemaware
- Wings (1996 video game), a computer game with space ships

== Computing ==
- WINGs, a Widget toolkit used by Window Maker
- Wings 3D, an open source computer graphics modeling program
- WINGs Display Manager, a display manager for the X window system

== Military ==
- Wing (military aviation unit), a unit of command
- Aircrew Badge or wings, worn in the United States military
- Aircrew brevet or wings, worn in the Royal Air Force and other Commonwealth air forces
- Parachutist Badge or wings
- United States Aviator Badge or wings

== Sports teams ==
- Dallas Wings, a WNBA team based in the Dallas–Fort Worth Metroplex
- Detroit Red Wings, an NHL team known colloquially as the Wings
- Kalamazoo Wings, an ice hockey team based in Kalamazoo, Michigan, United States
- Philadelphia Wings, a former professional lacrosse team based in Philadelphia
- Starwings Basel, a Swiss basketball team
- Wings Gaming, a professional Dota 2 eSports team based in China

== Transportation ==
- ANA Wings, subsidiary of All Nippon Airways
- MASwings, subsidiary of Malaysia Airlines
- Wings Air, a scheduled commuter passenger airline based in Jakarta, Indonesia
- Wings Alliance, a former proposed airline alliance

== Other uses ==
- Wings (Chinese constellation)
- Wings (cigarette), a brand of the Brown & Williamson Tobacco Corporation
- Wings (haircut), a haircut style
- Wings (horse), a British Thoroughbred racehorse
- Wings (Indonesian company), an Indonesian consumer goods company
- The wings, an area of a theatre stage hidden from the audience
- Backplate and wing, a type of scuba harness with an attached buoyancy compensation device
- Buffalo wings, a spicy preparation of fried chicken wings

== See also ==
- Wing (disambiguation)
- Wingz (disambiguation)
