= History of Asperger syndrome =

Asperger syndrome (AS) was formerly a separate diagnosis under autism spectrum disorder. Under the DSM-5 and ICD-11, patients formerly diagnosable with Asperger syndrome are diagnosable with Autism Spectrum Disorder. It was named after Hans Asperger (1906–80), who was an Austrian psychiatrist and pediatrician. An English psychiatrist, Lorna Wing, popularized the term "Asperger's syndrome" in a 1981 publication. The first book in English on Asperger syndrome was edited by Uta Frith in 1991 and incorporated her translation of Asperger's 1940 paper as chapter 2. The condition was subsequently recognized in formal diagnostic manuals later in the 1990s.

Details of Hans Asperger's actions as a psychiatrist in Nazi-era Austria, made public in 2018, incited debate of the syndrome's name and public lobbying for a renaming of the syndrome. However, subsequent studies have concluded that Hans Asperger did not commit actions that violated professional medical ethics during the Nazi period.

== Discovery of autistic psychopathy ==
=== Hans Asperger ===
Hans Asperger was director of the University of Vienna Children's Clinic. As a result, he spent most of his professional life in Vienna. Throughout Asperger's career, he was also a pediatrician, medical theorist, and medical professor. His works were published largely in German. He is most well known for his work with mental disorders, especially those in children. As a child, Asperger appeared to have exhibited some features of the very condition named after him, such as social remoteness and talent in language.

=== Asperger's research ===
Asperger's 1940 work, Autistic psychopathy in childhood, found that four of the 200 children studied had difficulty with integrating themselves socially. Although their intelligence levels appeared normal, the children lacked nonverbal communication skills, failed to demonstrate empathy with their peers, and were physically clumsy. Their verbal communication was either disjointed or overly formal, and their all-absorbing interest in a single topic dominated their conversations. Asperger named the condition "autistic psychopathy", and described it as primarily marked by social isolation. Asperger described those patients as like "little professors" who talked about their interests at great length, and believed the individuals he described would be capable of exceptional achievement and original thought later in life. Asperger's paper defended the value of high-functioning autistic individuals, writing "We are convinced, then, that autistic people have their place in the organism of the social community. They fulfill their role well, perhaps better than anyone else could, and we are talking of people who as children had the greatest difficulties and caused untold worries to their care-givers." However, he also wrote concerning his other cases, "Unfortunately, in the majority of cases the positive aspects of autism do not outweigh the negative ones...In many cases the social problems are so profound that they overshadow everything else ... the problems are compensated by a high level of original thought and experience."

A Soviet child psychiatrist, Grunya Sukhareva, described a similar syndrome that was published in Russian in 1926, and in German in 1932.

== Fritz V. ==
Fritz V. is a pseudonym that Hans Asperger used to refer to his first patient. This makes him the first person in history to be identified as having Asperger's Syndrome. Fritz displayed many behavioral problems in childhood and acted out at school but he had a strong interest in mathematics and astronomy, particularly the theories of Isaac Newton. Fritz grew up to become a professor of astronomy and solved an error in Newton's work he originally noticed as a child. Much of what Asperger learned about the condition in its early days derives from his meetings with Fritz, whom he kept track of throughout his life.

Fritz V. was born in June 1933 in Austria and was sent to Hans Asperger in autumn of 1939. The school referred him as they considered him "uneducable" by his first day there. He had severe impairment in social integration. Hans Asperger gave a very detailed report of Fritz and his efforts to understand his problems in his case report 'Autistic psychopathy' in childhood. Fritz was a first child of his parents. According to Asperger, his mother was a descendant of "one of the greatest Austrian poets" and she described her family as "in the mad-genius mould." Her family were intellectuals who wrote poetry "quite beautifully." Asperger noticed the genetic component of the syndrome here because Fritz's grandfather and several of his relatives had displayed similar traits and had been expelled from private schools numerous times. His grandfather lived as an eccentric recluse at the time of Asperger's report. He lived alone and was "preoccupied with his own thoughts." Fritz's mother also displayed similar behavior to him. She made poor eye contact, always looked unkempt, dressed rather poorly and walked in a very clunky, military fashion with her arms behind her back. She had problems communicating with her family and when things at home became too stressful she would travel alone to the Alps for weeks at a time and leave the rest of the family to deal with things themselves. Fritz's father was a civil servant and Asperger noted that he was 55 years old at the time of Fritz's birth.

Fritz had a normal birth. However, his motor development was delayed and he was very clumsy which worried his parents. He only learned to walk at fourteen months. He also had problems with learning self-help skills such as washing and cleaning. However, he also learned to talk much earlier at ten months and quickly expressed himself in formal sentence structure "like an adult." Asperger noted that from a young age, Fritz never did what he was told and would often intentionally do the exact opposite. Punishment did not deter him. He was restless and fidgety and had "a destructive urge." Any toys left around him would soon be broken. He did not get along well with other children either. They "wound him up" and he once attacked one with a hammer. He cared little for the danger posed to himself or others. He was kicked out of kindergarten on the first day. He attacked other children, paced about nonchalantly during the lesson and destroyed the coat-rack. Fritz did not care if people were upset with him and seemed to enjoy their angry responses to his disobedience. Despite this, he would also sometimes hug other classmates without provocation. Asperger noted that Fritz was indifferent to the authority of adults and would use abrasive, informal language when speaking to them (he used the informal "du" and never the formal "Sie"). He also displayed repetitive movements such as hitting, jumping and echolalia. Fritz had poor eye contact and would never look at people when speaking to them. He also spoke in a dull, monotone voice. He did however, sometimes sing "I don't like to say that" in response to a question or beat rhythms on objects around him. He experienced serious stomach problems from eating non-edible things such as pencils and from licking the tables. He did very poorly in PE because he was very clumsy and never swung in any rhythm. He would frequently run away from class or begin hitting and jumping up and down. When it came to intelligence tests, it was impossible to get a good measure of his intelligence as his responses to test questions varied. Sometimes he would jump up and move around or just answer with nonsense (Asperger implies here it might be deliberate) and other times he might give an answer considerably advanced for his age. Asperger noted that it almost seemed up to chance. To some questions, he would give a very precise answer and to others he would mumble nonsense.

Much of what Asperger learned about the syndrome and its effect on health and learning can be seen from his interactions with Fritz. He noted the many behavioral problems that Fritz faced and remarked that these problems he faced from a young age in making relationships with his parents would lead to later problems with his teachers and peers. Children's development relies quite heavily on things such as eye contact and understanding others which Fritz had problems with. Asperger believed Fritz could feel emotions very easily but the problems he had were with displaying them. Many of the traits that have came to be seen as key features of Asperger syndrome can be seen in Asperger's records of Fritz including, difficulty socializing and understanding the thoughts of others, trouble empathizing, special interests, motor problems, sensory issues, avoidance of other classmates and difficulty relating with peers. Asperger recommended to his mother that he would do better with a private tutor than he would in the full classroom but that even still, he would face some difficulties with keeping focus. Much of what Asperger had learned from Fritz has helped with the understanding of Asperger Syndrome today.

== Relationship to Kanner's work ==
Two subtypes of autism were described between 1943 and 1944 by two Austrian researchers — Austrian-born Asperger and child psychiatrist Leo Kanner (1894–1981). Kanner emigrated to the United States in 1924; he described a similar syndrome in 1943, known as "classic autism" or "Kannerian autism", characterized by significant cognitive and communicative deficiencies, including delayed or absent language development. Kanner's descriptions were influenced by the developmental approach of Arnold Gesell, while Asperger was influenced by accounts of schizophrenia and personality disorders. Asperger's frame of reference was Eugen Bleuler's typology, which Christopher Gillberg has described as "out of keeping with current diagnostic manuals", adding that Asperger's descriptions are "penetrating but not sufficiently systematic". Asperger was unaware of Kanner's description published a year before his; the two researchers were separated by an ocean and a raging war, and Asperger's descriptions were unnoticed in the United States. During his lifetime, Asperger's work, in German, remained largely unknown outside the German-speaking world.

The outlook the two had on the causes of Autism and the way it should be reacted to were quite different. Kanner was a bit more censorious of the parents of the autistic children and held their emotional coldness as at least partially responsible (see Refrigerator mother theory) whereas Hans Asperger was more sympathetic to the parents of his patients and even noticed that they had similar symptoms to their kids. Hans Asperger had very high hopes for his patients (his "little professors") and felt that they would benefit most from special tutors who were willing to deal with their many quirks and emotional problems, outside of an academic environment where they would have difficulties interacting with other children, and uncomfortable sensory stimuli and would be likely to disrupt classes.

== Coinage ==
According to Ishikawa and Ichihashi in the Japanese Journal of Clinical Medicine, the first author to use the term Asperger's syndrome in the English-language literature was the German physician, Gerhard Bosch. Between 1951 and 1962, Bosch worked as a psychiatrist at Frankfurt University. In 1962, he published a monograph detailing five case histories of individuals with PDD that was translated into English eight years later, becoming one of the first to establish German research on autism, and attracting attention outside the German-speaking world.

Lorna Wing coined the term Asperger's syndrome in 1976 and is also credited with widely popularizing the term in the English-speaking medical community in her February 1981 publication of a series of case studies of children showing similar symptoms. Wing also placed AS on the autism spectrum, although Asperger was uncomfortable characterizing his patient on the continuum of autistic spectrum disorders. She chose "Asperger's syndrome" as a neutral term to avoid the misunderstanding equated by the term autistic psychopathy with sociopathic behavior. Wing's publication effectively introduced the diagnostic concept into American psychiatry and renamed the condition as Asperger's; however, her accounts blurred some of the distinctions between Asperger's and Kanner's descriptions because she included some mildly disabled children and some children who presented with language delays early in life.

== Early studies ==
The first systematic studies appeared in the late 1980s in publications by Tantam (1988) in the UK, Gillberg and Gillberg in Sweden (1989), and Szatmari, Bartolucci and Bremmer (1989) in North America. The diagnostic criteria for AS were outlined by Gillberg and Gillberg in 1989; Szatmari also proposed criteria in 1989. Asperger's work became more widely available in English when Uta Frith, an early researcher of Kannerian autism, translated his original paper in 1991. AS became a distinct diagnosis in 1992, when it was included in the 10th published edition of the World Health Organization’s diagnostic manual, International Classification of Diseases (ICD-10); in 1994, it was added to the fourth edition of the Diagnostic and Statistical Manual of Mental Disorders (DSM-IV) as Asperger's Disorder. When Hans Asperger observed the autistic like symptoms and behaviors in boys through their social and communication skills, many professionals felt like Asperger's syndrome was just a less severe form of autism. Uta Frith was one of these professionals who had this opinion. She was a professor at the Institute of Cognitive Neuroscience of University College London, and was also an editor of Autism and Asperger Syndrome. She said that individuals with Asperger's had a "dash of autism". She was one of the first scientists who recognized autism and related disorders as the result of a condition of the brain instead of the outcome of detached parenting.

== Contemporary ==
Less than two decades after the widespread introduction of AS to English-speaking audiences, there are hundreds of books, articles and websites describing it; prevalence estimates have increased dramatically for ASD, with AS recognized as an important subgroup. However, questions remain concerning many aspects of AS; whether it should be a separate condition from high-functioning autism is a fundamental issue requiring further study. The diagnostic validity of Asperger syndrome is tentative, there is little consensus among clinical researchers about the usage of the term "Asperger's syndrome", and there are questions about the empirical validation of the DSM-IV and ICD-10 criteria. It is likely that the definition of the condition will change as new studies emerge and it will eventually be understood as a multifactorial heterogeneous neurodevelopmental disorder involving a catalyst that results in prenatal or perinatal changes in brain structures.

There is uncertainty regarding the gender gap between males and females with AS. A person with Asperger's is often remarked as possessing masculine traits like emotional distance from the inability to empathize, and far more boys than girls are diagnosed with Asperger's. Most studies on the syndrome were derived from research on males, neglecting specific attention to females with AS who often go misdiagnosed. For the most part, studies on girls with Asperger's are anecdotal.

== Changes in DSM-5 ==
In 1994, Asperger's Syndrome was added to the American Psychiatric Association's Diagnostic and Statistical Manual of Mental Disorders (DSM-IV). The DSM-V made a new, broad diagnosis in 2013 of autism spectrum disorder (ASD). This category contains the previous individual diagnoses of Autistic Disorder, Asperger's Syndrome, and other related developmental disorders. ASD is rated on levels of severity on a scale ranging from severe, through moderate, to mild based on clinical presentation. The levels are determined by the amount of support the individual requires.

== See also ==
- History of autism
