= Wing (disambiguation) =

A wing is an appendage used for flight by an animal or an apparatus used to create lift in aeronautics or a way to increase width (leverage) on a sailboat.

Wing may also refer to:

== Animals ==
- Bird wing
- Insect wing

== Places ==
=== England ===
- Wing, Buckinghamshire, England
- Wing, Rutland, England

=== United States ===
- Wing, Alabama, United States
- Wing, North Dakota, United States

== People with the name ==
- Wing (singer) (born 1960), the stage name of Wing Han Tsang, a New Zealand singer from Hong Kong
- Wing (beatboxer) (born 1997), the stage name of Kim Geonho, a South Korean beatboxer
- Amelia K. Wing (1837–1927), American author and philanthropist
- Anna Wing (1914–2013), English actress
- Brad Wing (born 1991), American-football player from Australia
- Craig Wing (born 1979), rugby league player for the Sydney Roosters
- Donald Wing (1904–1972), Yale Librarian, compiler of a notable short title catalogue of books
- F. A. Wing (1853–1947), American politician
- Helen Wing (1892–1981) American author, composer, and pianist
- Jeannette Wing, computer science researcher and corporate vice president of Microsoft Research
- Jerry J. Wing (1923–1994), American businessman and politician
- Joseph Wing (1810–1898), and William Ricketson Wing (1830–1908), owners of whaling company J. & W. R. Wing Company
- Lorna Wing (1928–2014), Asperger syndrome researcher
- Toby Wing (1915–2001), American actress
- Warner Wing (1805–1876), American jurist and legislator
- Wings Hauser (1805–1876), American actor and occasional director

== Arts, entertainment, and media ==
=== Fictional characters ===
- Wing (DC Comics), a DC Comics character
- Wing (Marvel Comics), name of two Marvel Comics characters
- Wing (Hunter × Hunter), a character from the manga series Hunter × Hunter
- Wing (Transformers), a character from the Transformers universe
- Colleen Wing, a samurai in the Marvel Comics universe
- Cure Wing, a character in Soaring Sky! Pretty Cure
- Wing span, a character in Chuck Chicken

=== Other uses in arts, entertainment, and media ===
- Wings (1990 TV series), American sitcom television series that ran for eight seasons on NBC
- Wing (poetry collection), by Matthew Francis
- "Wing" (South Park), an episode of South Park featuring the singer Wing
- Wing (waltz), a ballroom dance move
- WING, an AM radio station in Dayton, Ohio
- Wing Records, a record label
- "Wing", a song by Patti Smith from Gone Again, 1996

== Brands and enterprises ==
- Wing (company), a subsidiary of Alphabet
- T-Mobile Wing, a Pocket PC phone
- The Wing (workspace), a women-focused co-working space in the United States
- W*ING, a Japanese pro-wrestling organization

== Computing ==
- WinG, a Windows interface in computing
- Wing IDE, an integrated development environment for Python

== Transportation ==
- Wing, another term for fender, the panel which surrounds the wheel on a motor vehicle
- Wing, a type of spoiler, an aerodynamic device intended to generate downforce on a motor vehicle
- Wing configuration, is an aircraft design for fixed-wing aircraft, pertaining to its arrangement of lifting and related surfaces
- Wing-in-ground-effect (WiG, W-in-G, WinG)

== Other uses ==
- Wing (basketball), a combination shooting guard and small forward
- Wing (building), part of a building subordinate to the main
- Wing (military unit), a unit of command, usually comprising two or more squadrons
  - Wing commander, commanding officer of a wing
- Wing, part of the backplate and wing device worn by scuba divers
- Wing, one of several botanical terms
- Wing, a slang term for a human arm

== See also ==
- Left wing
- Right wing
- Take Wing, a racehorse
- Wing and a Prayer (disambiguation)
- Winger (sports), a position in several sports
- Wings (disambiguation)
