= Wing (comics) =

Wing or Wings, in comics, may refer to:

- Wing (DC Comics), also known as Wing How, is a DC Comics superhero and valet of the Crimson Avenger
- Wing (Elfquest), a character from Elfquest
- Colleen Wing, a Marvel Comics character
- Captain Wings, a Marvel Comics character
- Wings Comics, a Golden Age comic book title published by Fiction House
- Wing (Marvel Comics), a student of the Xavier Institute in Marvel Comics
- "Supergirl: Wings", an Elseworlds one-shot

It may also refer to:

- Blackwing, two Marvel Comics characters
- Blitzwing, a Transformers character who has appeared in the comics
- Darkwing Duck (character), a Disney character
- Deathwing (comics), an alternate version of Nightwing/Dick Grayson
- Dragonwing, a Marvel Comics character
- Dreadwing, a Transformers character made from combining two other robots, including Darkwing
- Iron Wings, a 2000 Image Comics mini-series
- Nightwing, a number of DC Comics characters
- Petalwing, a character from Elfquest
- Redwing (comics), a Marvel Comics characters
- Red Wing (comics), a DC Comics character
- Swingwing, a character from The Boys
- Thunderwing, a Transformers character
- Webwing, a Marvel Comics character and member of the Imperial Guard
- Wingman (comics), a DC Comics character and member of the Batmen of All Nations
- Wingman (manga), a manga series
- Wingnut (TMNT), a Teenage Mutant Ninja Turtles character
- Wingspan (Transformers), a Transformers character
- Wyatt Wingfoot, a Marvel Comics character

== See also ==
- Wing (disambiguation)
