= The Wing =

The Wing may refer to:

- Wing Luke Museum of the Asian Pacific American Experience
- The Wing (workspace), a women's co-working space and social club founded by Audrey Gelman
- Der Flügel or The Wing, in English, is a far-right faction within Germany's Alternative for Germany (AfD). The group is led by Björn Höcke.

== See also ==
- Wing (disambiguation)
