= Hiss (beatboxer) =

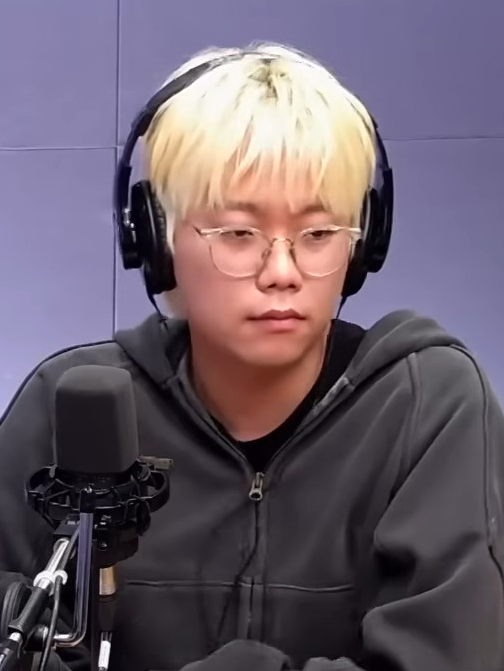
- Hiss in 2025
- Born: Choi Hyeon-seo; October 15, 2000 (age 25); Hwaseong, Gyeonggi, South Korea
- Occupations: Beatboxer; producer; DJ
- Years active: 2015–present
- Musical career
- Genres: Vocal Music; R&B
- Instruments: Beatboxing; beatrhyming; vocals; keyboards
- Label: Knockdown Entertainment
- Website: Official website

Korean name
- Hangul: 최현서
- Hanja: 崔賢書
- RR: Choe Hyeonseo
- MR: Ch'oe Hyŏnsŏ

Choi Hyeon-seo (Korean: 최현서; born October 15, 2000), better known by his stage name Hiss (히스), is a South Korean beatboxer and producer. Hiss is perhaps best known as runner-up in the Grand Beatbox Battle 2017 and winner in the Asia Beatbox Championship 2019. He is currently a member of the group Beatpella House. Hiss made his debut with released single "Jumpin" on October 18, 2018.

== Performance in competitions ==
As a participant on beatbox events
Years	Competitions	Held	Result	Notes
2015	Sound Effect	Seoul, South Korea	1	Solo
2015	Make it Harder	Seoul, South Korea	1	Solo
2015	Korea Beatbox Championship	Seoul, South Korea	2	Solo
2015	Die to Die vol.1	Busan, South Korea	Top 4	Solo
2016	Die to Die vol.2	Busan, South Korea	1	Solo
2016	Mic Monster	Seoul, South Korea	Top 4	Solo
2017	Grand Beatbox Battle	Basel, Switzerland	2	Solo
2017	Grand Beatbox Battle	Basel, Switzerland	Top 9	Tag team (with Two.H as MNSTWNSS)
2017	Asia Beatbox Championship	Taiwan	1	Tag team (with Big Road as Hiss Road)
2017	Korea Beatbox Championship	Seoul, South Korea	Top 8	Solo
2018	Beatbox Battle World Championship	Berlin, Germany	Top 4	Men solo
2018	Grand Beatbox Battle	Basel, Switzerland	3	Solo
2018	Grand Beatbox Battle	Basel, Switzerland	Top 9	Tag team (with Huckle as 2Real)
2018	World Beatbox Classic	Foshan, China	Top 8	Solo
2018	Korea Beatbox Championship	Seoul, South Korea	1	Solo
2019	Asia Beatbox Championship	Taiwan	1	Solo
2020	Grand Beatbox Battle	Online (by platform Discord Beatbox Community)	Top 16	Solo
2021	Grand Beatbox Battle	Warsaw, Poland	Top 16	Solo
2022	Beatbox United Online Battle	Online (by YouTube channel Chezame & SXIN)	1	Solo
2025	Grand Beatbox Battle	Tokyo, Japan	2	Tag team (with WinG as Hiss & WING)

As appreciates on competitions or events
Years	Competitions / events	Held	Notes
2016	Battler Festival	Seoul, South Korea	Judges
2016	A Front Runner	Seoul, South Korea	Judges
2017	By the JB Battle	Gunsan, South Korea	Judges
2017	Die to Die vol.3	Busan, South Korea	Judges
2018	Beatbox Legends Championship	Atlanta, US	Judges
2018	Smash Sound Beatbox Battle	New York, US	Judges
2019	Beatbox The Battle	Seoul, South Korea	Showcase
2021	Beatbox The Battle	Online (by YouTube channel's Korean Beatbox)	Showcase
2021	Grand Beatbox Battle	Warsaw, Poland	Showcase
2022	Korea Beatbox Championship	Seoul, South Korea	Judge
2023	Korea Beatbox Championship	Seoul, South Korea	Judge
2024	Korea Beatbox Championship	Seoul, South Korea	Judge
2024	Grand Beatbox Battle	Tokyo, Japan	Showcase
2025	Korea Beatbox Championship	Seoul, South Korea	Judge

== Discography ==
=== Albums ===
Title	Details
VOISS	Released: July 12, 2019; Label: Knockdown Entertainment, Danal Entertainment; Formats: Digital download; Track listing: 1. Change; 2. Watch Out; 3. Shuffle; 4. Can't Stop; 5. Bounce That; 6. Shadow Boxing; 7. Cowboy; 8. Forget The Past; 9. Play That Funk; 10. Skeleton Dance; 11. Chant; 12. Monster

=== Singles ===
==== As lead artist ====
Title	Year	Album
"JUMPIN" (with Gene Shinozaki, Codfish and Amit Bhowmick)	2018	Non-album single
"Get Ready"	2018	Non-album single
"INTRO" (with Sinzo)	2019	Non-album single
"Shuffle"	2019	VOISS
"Dream Again"	2022	Non-album single
"Rainbow"	2022	Non-album single
"If only" (with Alexinho, River' and Colaps)	2022	Non-album single
"Who cares" (with Alexinho)	2023	Non-album single

==== As promotional singles ====
Title	Year	Album
"Itaewon Freedom" (New Acapella ver.) (with H-has)	2018	VOCAL PLAY OST
"Believe Me" (Hiss solo)	2020	Future Voice
"High" (Hiss remix)	2020	Future Voice
"O.D.D" (with Sinzo)	2020	Non-album single

== Filmography ==
=== Television shows ===
Year	Program	Network	Roles	Ref.
2018	Vocal Play	Channel A	Contestant	
2020	Ask Me Anything	KBS Joy	Guest	
