= Racey Helps =

English children's author and illustrator, 1913–1970

- Born: 2 February 1913; Bristol, England
- Died: 1970; Barnstaple
- Occupation: Children's author, illustrator
- Genre: Children's literature

Angus Clifford Racey Helps (1913–1970) was an English children's author and illustrator. His books were written in a simple style and feature woodland creatures and birds, with illustrations by the author. He is known also for illustrating postcards, greeting cards, jigsaw puzzles, playing cards and wrapping paper.

== Biography ==
Helps was born in Bristol on 2 February 1913, to Clifford R. Helps and his wife Dorothy (née Davis), who had married in Cardiff in 1911. He spent his childhood in the hamlet of Chelvey, Somerset. He was privately educated at a vicarage and later at Bristol Cathedral School. Speaking in a 1966 television interview, Helps traced his story-telling back to his schooldays, when he began to write stories for a sick younger cousin. On leaving school he entered the antiquarian book trade and attended the West of England College of Art.

Helps married Irene Orr on 8 April 1936. A daughter, Anne, was born in July 1937, and a son, Julian, in 1949 or 1950. He used to tell his young daughter a bedtime story every night. His first notable success as an author and artist came during World War II with stories written for her. When the war came, Anne was packed off to a less noisy part of the country, but she still insisted on her story, and so Helps wrote them down for her, drew pictures to illustrate them, and sent them on.

During that time, Racey and Irene lived in Shepton Mallet, Somerset, and were hosts to many young American soldiers based in the town, besides running a hairdressing salon. On one occasion a publisher happened to drop in and pick up one of Helps's handwritten, illustrated booklets. Helps was invited to London to discuss publication of future work.

For a while the family lived in Clevedon, Somerset, then moved to Saltford near Bath, and in 1962 on to Barnstaple, Devon, where the scenic countryside provided further inspiration for Helps's pictures.

Racey Helps suffered a fatal heart attack at his Barnstaple home in 1970, at the age of 57.

== Publication ==
Helps's stories were published initially by Collins and later by the Medici Society. He contributed to several children's annuals published by Collins. Much of his work was published also by Rand McNally in the United States, where he illustrated several books written by Helen Wing. At least ten of his picture books appeared in German. At least one appeared in Danish.

== Collecting ==
The Barnaby Littlemouse series of books, particularly the first editions of the books, is scarce, which makes it attractive for book collectors.

Nobody Loves Me (1950) is the rarest and most desirable among them. Only 400 copies were published. It details the story of a little wooden Dutch doll that is never purchased at the store, who runs away when her sweetheart the Golliwog doll is sold to a little girl. She find herself bereft and lonely in the forest, but she's taken in by the sweet forest animals. It is a short biracial love story. The Collins publication is the first edition and is the most uncommon. It is 7 x 5.75 inches and 48 pages long.

== Partial bibliography ==
Barnaby Littlemouse books series (all published by Collins):
- Footprints in the Snow (1946)
- The Upside-Down Medicine (1946)
- Barnaby Camps Out (1947)
- My Friend Wilberforce (1947)
- Barnaby in Search of a House (1948)
- Littlemouse Crusoe (1948)
- Tippetty's Treasure (1949)
- Nobody Loves Me. The Story of a Dutch Doll (1950)
- Many Happy Returns (1951)

A further series published by Collins:

- Barnaby and the Scare-Crow (1953)
- Little Tommy Purr (1954)
- Two from a Tea-Pot (1954)
- Two's Company (1955)
- Barnaby's Spring Clean (1956)
- Prickly Pie (1957)
- The Tail of Hunky Dory (1958)

Books from other series:

- Kingcup Cottage Medici Society (1962)
- Diggy Takes His Pick Medici Society (1964)
- Mr. Roley to the Rescue Chilton Books (1966)
- The Blow-Away Balloon World Distributors (1967)
- The Clean Sweep World Distributors (1967)
- Pinny Takes a Bath World Distributors (1967)
- Two from a Tea-Pot World Distributors (1967)
- Selina the Circus Seal Chilton Book (1967)
- Mr. Flopears (A Rainy Adventure) Rand McNally & Company (1969)
- Just Wilberforce Medici Society (1970)
- Pinny's Holiday Medici Society (1970)
- Guinea-pig Podge Medici Society (1971)
- Racey Helps' Picture Book, verses by Celia Barrow Medici Society (1984)
