= Franz Hamburger =

Austrian pediatrician

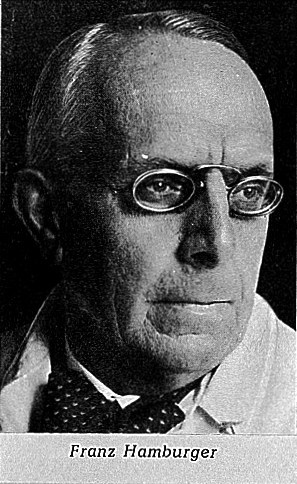
- Born: 14 August 1874; Pitten, Austria
- Died: 29 August 1954 (aged 80); Vöcklabruck, Upper Austria, Austria
- Scientific career
- Fields: Pediatric
- Military career
- Allegiance: Austria-Hungary
- Branch: Austro-Hungarian Army
- Service years: 1914–1917
- Conflicts: World War I; Serbian campaign; Italian front

Franz Hamburger (14 August 1874 in Pitten – 29 August 1954 in Vöcklabruck) was an Austrian medical doctor and university lecturer.

== Biography ==
Hamburger attended high school in Wiener Neustadt, and studied medicine at Ruprecht Karl University of Heidelberg, Munich and Graz. In Heidelberg in 1892 he was a member of the Corps Rhenania. In 1898 he passed the state medical examination for qualification as a doctor. After gaining his doctorate in medicine he became a ship's doctor, then worked as a doctor in Heidelberg, Vienna and Graz. Following specialist training as a pediatrician, he graduated in 1900 with Theodor Escherich. In 1906 he completed his habilitation thesis and worked as a lecturer. From 1914 to 1917 he fought in Serbia and Italy during World War I. In 1916 he became a full professor of pediatrics at the University of Graz. After the death of Clemens von Pirquet in 1930 he was invited to the University of Vienna, where he became Director of the Pediatric Clinic. One of his staff was Hans Asperger, the Austrian pediatrician and pioneer in the study of autism. In later years, Asperger spoke of Hamburger with great admiration as a man of impressive skill, and said that his teaching had been of immense influence upon his career. He joined the Nazi Party in 1934, at a time when it was still banned by the Austrofascist dictatorship of Engelbert Dollfuss. In 1944 he retired, but remained as manager of the children's ward at the hospital in Vöcklabruck.

== Works ==
- Kinderheilkunde, lehrbuch für Ärzte und Studenten (1920)
