= Wingz =

Wingz may refer to:

- Informix Wingz, a spreadsheet program
- Wingz (company), an American transportation network company

== See also ==
- Wings (disambiguation)
