= Helen Wing =

American author, composer

Helen Wilkie Wing (February 7, 1892 – December 19, 1981) was an American author, composer, and pianist who was born in Polk, North Carolina. She lived in Chicago, Illinois, for much of her life but also gave recitals in Michigan and Wisconsin.

Wing presented many recitals with Grace Holverscheid Tallman, singing duets and accompanying Grace on piano. Together with Grace and her husband, Richard Dean Tallman, Wing owned the Normandy House restaurant in Chicago.

Wing taught at the Bliss School of Music in Oak Park, Illinois. She wrote poems and songs for Child Life magazine, and at least 25 books for young children, including eight Rand McNally Junior Elf books. Her works were published by the Wetmore Declamation Bureau in Sioux City, Iowa, which provided plays and music for children, and the Chicago publisher Clayton F. Summy, who marketed spoken-word compositions to Chautauqua performers.

Wing's works include:

== Books ==
- Animal Alphabet (illustrated by Racey Helps)
- Animals at the Seashore (illustrated by Racey Helps)
- Animals' Boat Ride (illustrated by Racey Helps)
- Animals' Tea Party (illustrated by Irma Wilde)
- Billy Whiskers' Twins
- Georgie Porgie
- Happy Animals' ABC
- Happy Twins
- Kitten Twins (illustrated by Elizabeth Webb)
- Little Boy Blue's Horn
- Little Duckling (illustrated by Lucy Ozone)
- Nursery Nonsense of Now-a-days
- Old Woman Who Lives in a Shoe
- Play ABC With Me (illustrated by Racey Helps)
- Pony Twins (illustrated by Marjorie Cooper)
- Tubby Turtle
- Squirrel Twins (illustrated by Elizabeth Webb)

== Rand McNally Junior Elf Books ==
- Butterball the Little Chick (illustrated by Mary Jane Chase)
- Hickory, Dickory Dock (illustrated by Eleanor Corwin)
- Jack Sprat (illustrated by Anne Sellers Leaf)
- Little Bo Peep (illustrated by Mary Jane Chase)
- Playtime Poodles: A Real Live Animal Book (photographed by Jack Schmidling & Albert G. Westelin)
- Puppy Twins (illustrated by Ruth Bendel)
- Tie My Shoe (illustrated by Sharon Cane)
- Volksy: The Little Yellow Car (illustrated by Mary Jane Chase)

== Songs ==
- "Chink, Chink, Chinaman"
- "Circus"
- "Company"
- "Eskimo" (words by Mildred Plew Merryman)
- "Gingerbread Boy"
- "If"
- "Lilac Time"
- "Mother's Only Boy"
- "My Thoughts"
- "Nancy Sue"
- "Parasol"
- "Root for Rotary" (with Grace Holverscheid)
- "When I Am Very Old"
- "William"

== Theatre ==
- Miracle of Christmas (music by Phyllis Fergus, text by Wing)
- One-Act Play
