= Hans Asperger =

Austrian physician (1906–1980)

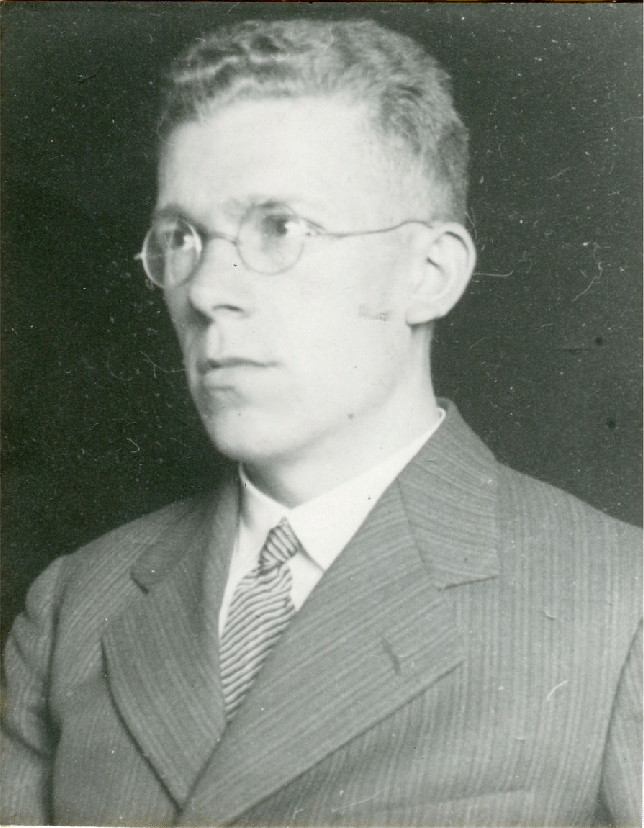
- Asperger in the 1940s
- Born: Johann Friedrich Karl Asperger; 18 February 1906; Vienna, Austria-Hungary
- Died: 21 October 1980 (aged 74); Vienna, Austria
- Education: University of Vienna
- Known for: Writing on "autistic psychopathy" Eponym of Asperger syndrome
- Medical career
- Profession: Physician
- Institutions: University Children's Hospital, Vienna
- Sub-specialties: Pediatrics
- Research: Autism

Johann Friedrich Karl Asperger (/ˈæspɜːrɡər/; German: [ˈhans ˈaspɛɐ̯ɡɐ]; 18 February 1906 – 21 October 1980) was an Austrian physician. He studied atypical neurology, specifically in children, and is the namesake of Asperger syndrome. He wrote more than 300 publications on psychological disorders that posthumously acquired international renown in the 1980s.

In the late 2010s he was accused of referring children to the Am Spiegelgrund children's clinic in Vienna during the Nazi period. The clinic was responsible for murdering hundreds of disabled children deemed to be "unworthy of life" as part of the Third Reich's child euthanasia programs (as part of the T4 Programme).

However, subsequent peer-reviewed studies have concluded that, although it is not possible to determine with certainty what Asperger knew about the infant euthanasia program, he was not directly involved in it, did not violate professional medical ethics and the fatal decisions that led to the deaths of some of his patients were made by other physicians. Historical records indicate that Asperger did not report any children to the Berlin health authorities, despite being legally obliged to do so at the time.

== Biography ==
Hans Asperger was born in Neustiftgasse in the 7th district of Vienna, Austria, on 18 February 1906, and was raised on a farm in Hausbrunn not far from the city. He was the eldest of three sons; his younger brother died shortly after birth. As a youth, he joined the Wandering Scholars of the Bund Neuland (in the group of Fahrende Scholaren, which organized outdoor activities such as hiking and mountaineering). "Founded in 1921, the Austria-based Bund was a split-off from the Christian-German Student Union (CDSB) but stressed its affinities with the German Youth Movement (...) which Asperger cited in 1974 as a guiding principle in his life." He later stated that "[he] was moulded by the spirit of the German youth movement, which was one of the noblest blossoms of the German spirit." This movement maintained close links with the Hitler Youth from the 1930s onwards.

Hans Asperger was described as "cold and distant". He collected over 10,000 books in his personal library during his lifetime. He attributed his "progressive spiritual maturity" to his reading. His former colleagues at the pediatric clinic in Vienna testified that he often quoted classical authors, poets or the Bible.

According to his daughter Maria Asperger-Felder, the two events that most affected Hans Asperger between 1931 and 1945 were, on the one hand, the development of curative education (Heilpädagogik), and on the other hand, the confrontation with the ideology of National Socialism.

=== Family ===
Hans Asperger married Hanna Kalmon in 1935, whom he met during a mountain hike, and with whom he had five children; four daughters and a son: Gertrud (born 1936), Hans (born 1938), Hedwig (born 1940), Maria (born 1946) and Brigitte (born 1948). In 1961, Gertrud Asperger completed her doctorate at Innsbruck. Another daughter, Maria Asperger Felder, became a renowned child psychiatrist.

=== Religion ===
Hans Asperger was a devout Christian, a practicing Catholic, but without the political tendencies generally associated with Catholicism at the time. His faith was initially considered a disadvantage in his evaluation after the Anschluss. He was a member of the Sankt-Lukas Guild, which, according to Sheffer and Czech, "advocated for Catholic eugenics", including support for "positive eugenics" (the multiplication of individuals considered desirable) rather than "negative eugenics" (the limitation of individuals considered undesirable).

Czech points out that "the potential obstacles to his [Hans Asperger's] support for National Socialism were his religious convictions, his humanistic background, and his elitist and cultured habitus. He adds that "Asperger’s political socialization in Neuland likely blinded him to National Socialism’s destructive character due to an affinity with core ideological elements."

=== Education ===
Asperger stated that he discovered his future calling in medicine while dissecting the liver of a mouse during his final year of high school. He passed his secondary school final examination on 20 May 1925, with distinction and the grade of "very good" in all subjects.

According to his daughter, from 1916 to 1928, he followed an education oriented towards humanism, learning western philosophy, Latin and ancient Greek. Asperger studied medicine at the University of Vienna under Franz Hamburger and practiced at the University Children's Hospital in Vienna. Asperger earned his medical degree in 1931 and became director of the special education section at the university's children's clinic in Vienna in 1932. He joined the Fatherland Front on 10 May 1934, nine days after Chancellor Engelbert Dollfuss passed a new constitution making himself dictator.

== Career ==
=== Early career (1930–1938) ===
According to Czech, "with the appointment of Hamburger as president in 1930, the Vienna University Paediatric Clinic became a beacon of anti-Jewish policy, long before the Nazi takeover." This assessment is consistent with work from the 2020s on the role of academics at the University of Vienna long before the Nazi takeover in 1938. Ideas of "purity" were widespread and scholars were eager to enforce a narrow "conceptualization of what is ‘German’ and what not or by claiming some groups as forebears (Bavarians, Swabians) while excluding others (Slovene bilinguals, Yiddish, Rotwelsh speakers)". By helping to eradicate what was labelled as "impure" Volk members, Asperger may have actively supported NS doctrine.

Following the death of Clemens von Pirquet in 1929, Franz Hamburger expelled the Jewish doctors from the clinic, and also tried to remove the women. Hans Asperger thus obtained his first post in May 1931, thanks to the "purge" of Jewish doctors, as Hamburger's assistant at the University Paediatric Clinic in Vienna. He then worked for different departments. Czech points out the changes in leadership: "The political orientation of Hamburger's assistants is illustrated by the fact that among those who obtained the highest academic qualification (habilitation), all, with the exception of Hans Asperger, were rejected in 1945 as Nazis." Under the influence of Franz Chvostek junior, the Vienna clinic became a "hotbed of pan-Germanist and Nazi agitation".

When Erwin Lazar, the head of the curative pedagogy department died in 1932, Hans Asperger took over in May 1934 or 1935, as head of the department of Heilpädagogik (or: Heilpädagogische curative pedagogy) at the pediatric clinic in Vienna. He joined an experienced team, consisting of psychiatrist Georg Frankl (who was Jewish), psychologist Josef Feldner and a nun, Sister Viktorine Zak. Asperger's very rapid rise to head of the pediatric ward, despite his few publications and the existence of more qualified candidates, was facilitated by the anti-Jewish policy. The team also included, from August 1933 to February 1936, a young doctor specializing in gastrointestinal disorders, Erwin Jekelius, who later became a major architect of the Nazi extermination. The pedagogy employed in Heilpädagogik was inspired by Erwin Lazar, the founder of the clinic; Asperger continued and developed this approach. He was influenced by two pedagogues, Jan-Daniel Georgens and Johann Heinrich Deinhardt, who founded a specialized institute in 1856. He was particularly interested in the "psychically abnormal child".

In addition to Hamburger and Jekelius, Asperger frequented other Nazi ideologues, including Erwin Risak, who studied with him in 1931 and with whom he co-authored an article the following year.

This early phase of Asperger's career was spent entirely at the Vienna University Paediatric Clinic, with two brief exceptions. In 1934 he was invited to work with Paul Schröder at the psychiatric clinic in Leipzig. During the summer of 1934 he was also invited to spend three months working with director Otto Pötzl at the psychiatric hospital in Vienna (whom he would later describe as a "terrifying exterminator"). Asperger joined the nationalist and anti-Semitic German Medical Association in Austria the same year.

=== World War II (1939–1945) ===
During World War II, Asperger was a medical officer, serving in the Axis occupation of Yugoslavia; his younger brother died at Stalingrad. Near the end of the war, Asperger opened a school for children with Sister Viktorine Zak. The school was bombed and destroyed, Sister Viktorine was killed, and much of Asperger's early work was lost.

Asperger published a definition of "autistic psychopathy" in 1944 that resembled the definition published earlier by Russian neurologist Grunya Sukhareva in 1926. Asperger identified four boys with a pattern of behavior and abilities that included “a lack of empathy, little ability to form friendships, one-sided conversations, intense absorption in a special interest, and clumsy movements”. Asperger noticed that some of the children he identified as being autistic used their special talents in adulthood and had successful careers: one became a professor of astronomy and solved an error in Newton's work that he had originally noticed as a student, and another was Austrian writer and Nobel Prize in Literature laureate, Elfriede Jelinek.

Under the Third Reich, with his position as a doctor in Vienna, Hans Asperger was a decision-maker in the context of examinations of minors: he could defend them if he thought they would integrate into Volk (the national community of Nazi Germany), or the contrary, sending to Spiegelgrund the minors that he thought were unfit for integration. Am Spiegelgrund clinic, created in July 1940 on the premises of the Steinhof psychiatric hospital in Vienna, was directed by Erwin Jekelius, a former colleague of Asperger's at the university clinic who became a major architect of the extermination policy, from June 1940 until the end of 1941.

During the last two years of the Second World War, from April 1943, Asperger was a doctor for the Wehrmacht. He underwent nine months of training in Vienna and Brünn, then was sent with the 392nd Infantry Division to Independent State of Croatia in December 1943 as part of a "mission of protection" of the occupied territories in Yugoslavia and the struggle against the "partisans". The Heilpädagogik, in which Asperger worked before his military service, was destroyed in 1944 by a bombing, in which Sister Viktorine Zak was killed.

In 1944, after the publication of his landmark paper describing autistic symptoms, Asperger found a permanent tenured post at the University of Vienna. Shortly after the war ended, he became director of a children's clinic in the city. There, he was appointed chair of pediatrics at the University of Vienna, a post he held for twenty years. He later held a post at Innsbruck.

=== Post-World War II (1945 to death) ===
Hans Asperger resumed his academic career after the war in 1945, returning to the department he was directing, which had been destroyed by a bombardment. His authorization to teach was confirmed on February 9, 1946, because he was not a member of the NSDAP.

Between 1946 and 1949, he was deputy director of the pediatric clinic in Vienna. In 1948, he co-founded the pediatric clinic, Österreichische Arbeitsgemeinschaft für Heilpädagogik (now the Heilpädagogische Gesellschaft Österreichs) in Innsbruck, Austria, for 5 years, succeeding Richard Priesel, who died suddenly on 18 November 1955. Documentation of this part of his life is scarce. Hans Asperger's name is the last one mentioned on the list of recommendations, after those of three other doctors. Asperger took up his new position on 31 March 1957, with an inaugural lecture devoted to problems in modern pediatrics. According to the Innsbruck historian Franz Huter (1899–1997), Hans Asperger "quickly created a circle of friends and colleagues". His wife Hanna preferred to stay in Vienna. He was generally appreciated there for his pedagogy.

Asperger was then appointed to the chair of pediatrics at the Vienna hospital on 26 June 1962, and was its director until his official retirement in 1977. In 1964, he was in charge of SOS–Kinderdorf in Hinterbrüh. That same year he was appointed president of the Internationalen Gesellschaft für Heilpädagogik.

On 8 May 1971, he was appointed vice-president of the newly founded Austrian Society for Allergy and Immunology (Österreichische Gesellschaft für Allergologie und Immunologie).

He became professor emeritus in 1977, and died three years later on 21 October 1980, after a short illness.

=== Allegations of persecution by the Gestapo ===
Post-war tales of "resistance" by some of the most involved academic Nazi perpetrators were common. According to a statement from 1962, the Gestapo attempted to arrest Hans Asperger because of remarks during a 1938 lecture. However, the only known source for this claim is Hans Asperger himself, who mentioned this incident during the inauguration of his chair of pediatrics, and then claimed to have been "saved from the Gestapo" by his mentor Franz Hamburger, during an interview in 1974. During the same interview, he claimed to have "volunteered for the army to escape Gestapo reprisals because he had refused to cooperate with Nazi racial hygiene policies". There is no evidence in the archives of any attempted arrest by the Gestapo.

Other facts speak against Asperger's self-portrayal as a man persecuted by the Gestapo for his resistance to Nazi racial hygiene, who had to flee into military service to avoid further problems. On several occasions, he published approving comments on racial hygiene measures such as forced sterilizations. – Herwig Czech, Hans Asperger, National Socialism, and "race hygiene" in Nazi-era Vienna

There is no archival evidence that Asperger's publications were perceived to be opposed to the new regime. In November 1940, the Vienna Gestapo responded that it had "nothing on him" to a request for a political evaluation of Asperger; this is the only documented interaction between Asperger and the Gestapo. Czech believes that this Gestapo investigation is the source of Asperger's subsequent claim that he was being persecuted, and that his Nazi party (NSDAP) mentor, Franz Hamburger, most likely vouched for his assistant while asking him to cooperate with the ruling regime, which would explain Asperger's statement during his 1974 interview.

== Nazi involvement allegations ==
According to Simon Baron-Cohen et al., "The degree of Asperger’s involvement in the targeting of Vienna’s most vulnerable children has remained an open and vexing question in autism research for a long time." However, as is becoming clearer in historical research, collaboration of scientists and university teachers of all fields was the norm rather than the exception in the Third Reich and as various academic studies reveal, Hans Asperger did not violate professional medical ethics during the Nazi period, contrary to what was claimed in 2018.

Edith Sheffer, a modern European history scholar, wrote in 2018 that Asperger cooperated with the Nazi regime, including sending children to the Am Spiegelgrund clinic which participated in the euthanasia program. According to Sheffer, Asperger supported the Nazi goal of eliminating children who could not fit in with the Volk: "people" in german.

Herwig Czech, another scholar and historian from the Medical University of Vienna, concluded in a 2017 article in the journal Molecular Autism, which was published in April 2018:

Asperger managed to accommodate himself to the Nazi regime and was rewarded for his affirmations of loyalty with career opportunities. He joined several organizations affiliated with the NSDAP (although not the Nazi party itself), publicly legitimized 'race hygiene' policies including forced sterilizations and, on several occasions, actively cooperated with the child 'euthanasia' program.

Asperger worked under the direction of Franz Hamburger, a prominent long-time member of the NSDAP, for whom he expressed the greatest admiration, signed his letters with the formal "Heil Hitler", and joined organizations affiliated with the Nazi Party after 1938. (Deutsche Arbeitsfront, Nationalsozialistische Volkswohlfahrt, Nationalsozialistischer Deutscher Ärztebund). For Czech, "by renouncing membership in the NSDAP, he chose a middle path between staying away from the new regime and aligning himself with it."

Dean Falk, an American anthropologist from Florida State University, questioned Czech and Sheffer's allegations against Hans Asperger in a paper in Journal of Autism and Developmental Disorders. Czech's reply was published in the same journal. Falk defended her paper against Czech's reply in a second paper.

Based on a review of Czech and Sheffer's work, Norwegian doctor and historical scholar Ketil Slagstad concluded:

The story of Hans Asperger, Nazism, murdered children, post-war oblivion, the birth of the diagnosis in the 1980s, the gradual expansion of the diagnostic criteria and the huge recent interest in autism spectrum disorders exemplify the historical and volatile nature of diagnoses: they are historic constructs that reflect the times and societies where they exert their effect.

Slagstad also wrote, "Historical research has now shown that [Asperger] was...a well-adapted cog in the machine of a deadly regime. He deliberately referred disabled children to the clinic Am Spiegelgrund, where he knew that they were at risk of being killed. The eponym Asperger’s syndrome ought to be used with an awareness of its historical origin."

After the Anschluss, Asperger, like all medical personnel, was investigated in the application of the "decree on the reorganization of the Austrian professional civil service" dated May 31, 1938, and then received confidential evaluations from NSDAP officials, who expressed an increasingly positive opinion of him. His first evaluation, dated June 1939, judged him "politically acceptable from the National Socialist point of view", "unassailable as far as his character and politics are concerned", and concluded with the statement that Asperger was "in conformity with the racial and sterilization laws of National Socialism", despite his Catholic orientation. In October 1940, he wrote that he had "committed himself to work for the Hitler Youth". Czech analyzed this as a desire to adapt to the new regime and to protect his career. Hans Asperger was never considered an opponent of the regime. According to Czech, "Asperger’s political socialization in Neuland likely blinded him to National Socialism’s destructive character due to an affinity with core ideological elements." Czech asserts that Asperger "publicly protected his patients from forced sterilization", supporting his claim with Asperger's description of his patients "whose abnormity is not of a type that would call for sterilization, who would socially fail without our understanding and guiding assistance, but who with this help are able to occupy their place in the large organism of our people".

In 1939, he published an article with his colleague Heribert Goll, in which he "demonstrated" that innate or hereditary characteristics determine later personality traits. This article was published in the journal, edited by Otmar von Verschuer, a prominent propagator of Racial hygiene theories. According to Czech's analysis, "Asperger went so far in these attempts [to prove his loyalty to the NSDAP] that his collaborator Josef Feldner had to restrain him, lest he risks his credibility."

Asperger obtained his accreditation in 1943, passing the political control of the National Socialist League of German Lecturers.

The British psychiatrist Lorna Wing and the anthropologist Dean Falk consider that Hans Asperger's Catholic convictions are incompatible with the voluntary sending of children to extermination programs. For Falk, it is not certain that Asperger was aware of the fate awaiting the children he had transferred to: knowing his religion, his colleagues could have hidden this information from him. Czech refutes Falk's conclusions, noting that the Viennese population was protesting against the mortality rates in psychiatric hospitals several months before Asperger referred patients to the Am Spiegelgrund clinic and that even if he was not informed of the intention of the officials of the clinic to kill the children he referred there, he was necessarily aware of these mortality rates and of the risks that a transfer to the clinic would pose to the children. Czech concludes that "The assumption that Asperger was unaware of the risks to the children is unfounded."

The curative pedagogy promoted by Hans Asperger was never considered to be contrary to the objectives of the Third Reich, which was marked by a shortage of manpower. Moreover, this approach was approved by euthanasia policy makers such as Erwin Jekelius. Only children considered to be educable benefit from it. Hans Asperger's text, which is most often interpreted as a defense of his autistic patients against the "euthanasia" program, can also be read in a utilitarian way. For Sheffer, "the examination of the archives reveals the dual nature of his action." According to her:

He distinguished between young people whom he considered amendable, endowed with a potential for "social integration", and those judged irrecoverable. At the same time as he offered intensive and individualized care to promising children, he ordered the placement in an institution or even the transfer to the home of severely handicapped children.

Czech believes that the argument that Asperger placed a positive emphasis on a small number of autistic individuals in order to protect all autistic children does not hold water. For Sheffer, Asperger is a "self-proclaimed eugenicist" and "this duality of Asperger's mirrors that of Nazism as a whole."

=== Children sent to Am Spiegelgrund ===
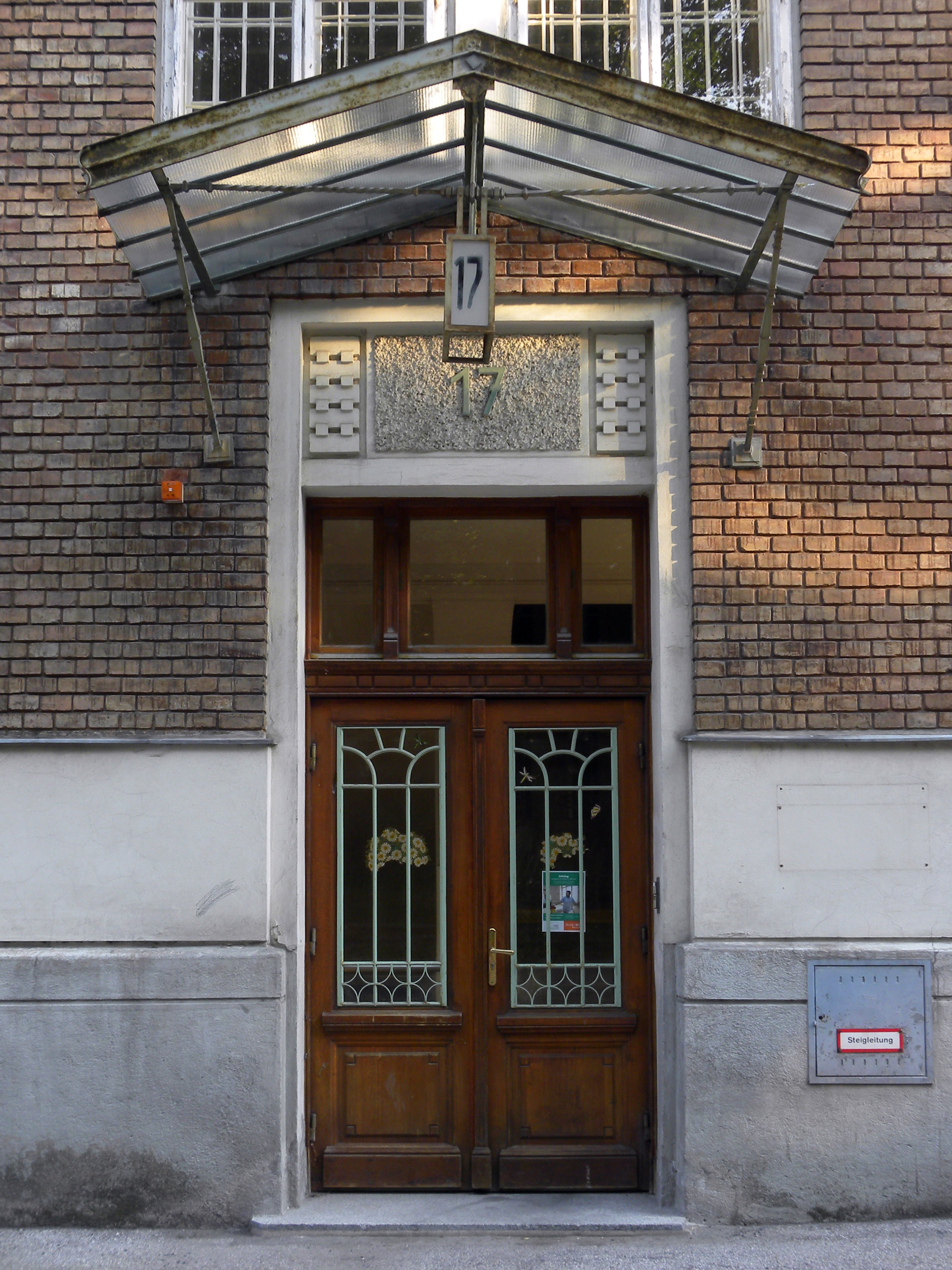
Doorstep of Am Spiegelgrund clinic

In 1940, Asperger obtained a position as a medical expert in Vienna, for which he was responsible for diagnosing "hereditary diseases" and proposing forced sterilization in the interest of the Nazi eugenics program. Even at that time, the excess mortality in Vienna's psychiatric hospitals was well known to the population, which protested against this situation, especially in September and November 1940. According to Czech's analysis of Hans Asperger's written diagnoses, he was not "more benevolent towards his patients than his peers in labelling children with diagnoses that could have an enormous impact on their future – quite the contrary"; in the majority of cases, Asperger made a harsher judgment than other doctors towards the children and adolescents he examined.

He described one of the children he recommended for Am Spiegelgrund on 27 June 1941, Herta Schreiber, as follows:

Severe personality disorder (post–encephalic?): very severe motor retardation; erethic idiocy; epileptic seizures. The child is an unbearable burden at home for her mother, who has five healthy children to care for. A permanent placement in seems absolutely necessary – Dr. Asperger, WStLA file, 1.3.2.209.10, Herta Schreiber, Heilpädagogische Abteilung der Universitäts–Kinderklinik Vienna, 27 June 1941

In the case of Herta, archival documentation describes the following sequence of events. According to the source, the term "special treatment" (Spezialbehandlung) used by Wilhelm Schmidt functioned as a coded term employed by the organizers of the child euthanasia program. On 1 July 1941, Herta was brought to the institution, presumably by her mother, and admitted; the financing authority for her hospitalization was not specified. The mother also discussed with the staff the possibility of the child's death.

On 20 July 1941, a physician at the hospital diagnosed Herta with "severe mental deficiency (idiocy) 1a." She was subsequently reported to the Reich Committee for the Scientific Registration of Severe Hereditary and Congenital Diseases, the organization in Berlin coordinating the secret child euthanasia program, on 8 August 1941. Herta died at Am Spiegelgrund on 2 September 1941, officially of "pneumonia".

A second documented case concerns Elisabeth Schreiber, the other child sent to Am Spiegelgrund. On 27 October 1941, Hans Asperger described her as follows:

Hereditary imbecility, probably of post-encephalitic origin. Salivation, ‘encephalitic’ affects, negativism, significant language deficit (now slowly beginning to speak), with relatively better comprehension. In the family, the child is undoubtedly a burden hardly bearable, especially under crowded living conditions, and due to her aggressiveness endangers her younger siblings. Therefore, it is understandable that the mother insists on institutionalization. Am Spiegelgrund would be the best solution.

The diagnosis indicated moderate non-hereditary intellectual disability with delayed speech but relatively better comprehension.

However, Elisabeth later received a second diagnosis at Am Spiegelgrund by other physicians, which classified her as "severe mental deficiency (idiocy) 1a." This diagnosis led to her inclusion in the child euthanasia program and ultimately to her death.

According to a study conducted by Klaus Schepker and Christine Freitag, which reports this information, Hans Asperger did not violate medical professional ethics during the Nazi period, did not participate in nor recommend child euthanasia, and the fatal decisions were made exclusively by other physicians responsible for the transfers and reporting.

In 1942, following a request addressed to his superior Franz Hamburger, Asperger took part in a selection of patients aimed at separating the "uneducable" from those who could become German citizens. Although he was not directly responsible for their death, he chose 35 children whom he considered to be "uneducable". However, a 2025 study clarified Hans Asperger's role in the Gugging Commission. According to archival records, the commission was officially tasked with evaluating which children should attend auxiliary schools and consisted of officials from Vienna and the Lower Danube. The term "Aktion Jekelius", which some authors had associated with child euthanasia, was communicated only within the Reich Governor's Office in the Lower Danube and not to the Vienna physicians who were part of the commission, including Asperger. No direct links were found between the Gugging Commission and Am Spiegelgrund.

While he did not cooperate with the forced sterilization programs according to the records, he also did not oppose them. According to Czech, "what emerges from the available sources is that Asperger's approach to the forced sterilization program was ambivalent." He quotes passages written by Hans Asperger demonstrating his support for this aspect of racial hygiene policy:

In the new Germany, we took on new responsibilities in addition to our old ones. To the task of helping the individual patient is added the great obligation to promote the health of the people [], which is more than the well–being of the individual. I need not add to the enormous amount of dedicated work done in terms of affirmative action and support. But we all know that we must also take restrictive measures. Just as the physician must often make painful incisions during the treatment of individuals, we must also make incisions in the national body [], out of a sense of responsibility: we must make sure that those patients who would pass on their diseases to distant generations, to the detriment of the individual and of the Volk, are prevented from passing on their diseased hereditary material – Hans Asperger, Pädagogische Therapie bei abnormen Kindern

There is a possible protective case of a patient, Aurel I., whom Hans Asperger examined in the autumn of 1939 and exempted from group education. His family sent him to the countryside, where he survived the war under his parents' care. In 1962, a member of Asperger's family believed that he had saved Aurel from "castration" and possibly worse. Asperger wrote his report a few days before the introduction of the sterilization law in Austria.

Further Research by Ernst Tatzer, Werner Maleczek, Franz Waldhauser in 2022 concluded as follows. ″Our detailed investigation, aided by historians, and investigations by other authors, showed no clear evidence to support the allegation that Asperger knowingly or willingly participated in the National Socialist Child Euthanasia programme in Vienna. This investigation included thorough analyses of the records for all the patients he and colleagues referred to Am Spiegelgrund from the Therapeutic Pedagogy Unit of the University Children's Hospital in Vienna. This covered the period between 1939 and March 1943 when Asperger was drafted by the military.″ They first examined all admissions from the hospital where Aspergers worked and then which patients Asperger had either direct or indirect involvement with, cross-referencing this with Am Spiegelgrund's own records including their book of the dead to trace any missing records as well as all referrals to the Reich committee responsible. They found no reports by Hans Asperger. One patient died of natural causes while another was referred to the clinic after having been sent to another institution. They were reported by the then director of Am Spiegelgrund to the Reich committee, against Hans Asperger's original recommendation, at the request of the institution the child had been sent to. A third child was not referred to the clinic by Asperger but by his family doctor. He did not die at the clinic or as a result of Asperger's recommendation, but as a result of a director of another institution and his family doctors own actions as well as orders from the Reich committee in relation to forced labour workers. Asperger had no involvement in this case and this patient was referred by the family doctor to Am Spiegelgrund and had been reported for forced labour by the director of the institution he had been placed at. All of Hans Asperger's other patients survived.

==== Hansi Busztin ====
The Heilpädagogik Vienna department, where Asperger worked, is known to have taken in Hansi Busztin from September 1942, a Jewish patient in hiding until the end of the war, who states that about a hundred people knew of his existence, and that this department housed "a group of opponents of National Socialism". However, Busztin does not mention Hans Asperger's name, and Asperger makes no reference to this episode even after the war, even though it could have helped him establish anti-Nazi credentials. According to Czech, Asperger may have been aware of this Jewish patient, but he did not take an active role in protecting him, and more importantly, joined the Wehrmacht only six months after Busztin's admission. Czech considers it likely that Asperger joined the Wehrmacht to protect himself in case Busztin's presence in his ward was discovered, rather than because of "persecution by the Gestapo", which is not proven. However, he also did not denounce the presence of this Jewish child.

== Works and publications ==
Hans Asperger published a total of 359 texts, most of them devoted to "autistic psychopathy" and the notion of death. All of his publications are written in German. According to Edith Sheffer, the context in which Asperger evolved facilitated the development of his most famous publication, insofar as he and his colleagues frequently used the notion of "Gemüt", which had been misused in Nazi psychiatry to refer to "the metaphysical capacity of humans to form social bonds". This caused Nazi doctors and psychiatrists to pay attention to children they considered to have a weak Gemüt. The first description of autism was thus based on an observation of this population of children. Czech, on the other hand, believes that Sheffer places too much emphasis on the concept of Gemüt and that "psychiatry during National Socialism is much better characterized by the concept of ‘life unworthy of living’."

=== Die "Autistischen Psychopathen" im Kindesalter ===
Hans Asperger established in 1943 the description of an "autistic psychopathy of childhood". He identified in over 200 children (including 4 cases of young boys described in detail) a pattern of behavior and skills including "lack of empathy, poor ability to make friends, unidirectional conversation, strong preoccupation with special interests, and awkward movements". Asperger calls these four boys his "little teachers" because of their ability to talk about their favourite subject in great detail. His article was not published until 1944 in the journal:

- (de) "Die 'Autistischen Psychopathen' im Kindesalter", Archiv für Psychiatrie und Nervenkrankheiten, no 117, 1944, pp. 76–136 – the article appeared in 1938 in Wiener Klinische Wochenschrift.

=== Other publications ===
- "Leucin und Tyrosin im Ham bei Lungengeschwülsten". Klin WSCHR (in German). 2. Wien: 1281–1284. 1930.
- Siegl (1934). "Zur Behandlung der Enuresis". Archiv für Kinderheilkunde (in German): 88–102.
- "Das psychisch abnorme Kind". Wiener Klinische Wochenschrift (in German). 49: 1314–1317. 1938.
- ""Jugendpsychiatrie" und "Heilpädagogik"". Münch med WSCHR (in German). 89. Munchen, Berlin: 352–356. 1942.
- "Kataloge der Universitäten Graz, Linz, Bratislava und Innsbruck". webapp.uibk.ac.at (in German).
- "Postencephalitische Persönlichkeitsstörungen". Münch med WSCHR (in German). 91. München, Berlin: 114–117. 1944.
- "Encephalitis im Kindesalter und Folgezustände". Wien Klin WSCHR (in German). 64 (H. 10): 171. 1952.
- Asperger H (1954). "Heilpädagogische Problematik der organischen Hirnstörungen". Acta Psychother Psychosom Orthopedagog (in German). 2 (2): 115–126. doi:10.1159/000278416.
- "Heilpädagogik: Eine Einführung in die Psychopathologie des Kindes für Ärzte, Lehrer, Psychologen, Richter und Fürsorgerinnen" (in German) (2 ed.). Wien: Springer Verlag. 1956.
- "Die Jugendgemeinschaften als Erziehungsfaktor: Jugend in Not. Schriften zur Volksbildung des Bundesministeriums für Unterricht" (in German). Vienna. 1959.
- Laireiter M (1966). Die Fremdversorgung der Jugend (in German). Salzburg: Pädagogisches Institut.
- "Zur Differentialdiagnose des frühkindlichen Autismus". Acta Paedopsychiatrica (in German). 35: 136–145. 1968.
- Schmid F (1969). Springer Verlag (ed.). "Neurologie-Psychologie-Psychiatrie" (in German). New York.
- "Kurze Geschichte der Internationalen Gesellschaft für Heilpädagogik". Heilpädagogik, Fachzeitschr. D. Österr. Ges. F. Heilpäd (in German). 4: 50–55. 1971.
- Österr. Bundesverl. für Unterricht, Wissenschaft und Kunst, ed. (1974). "Das Werden sozialer Einstellungen in Familie, Schule und anderen Sozialformen" (in German). Vienna.
- Asperger H, Haider F (1975). Österreichischer Bundesverlag (ed.). Leben heute – Eine Herausforderung an die Pädagogik – Tagungsbericht der 23. internationalen pädagogischen Werktagung (in German). pp. 60–70.
- Österreichische Gesellschaft für Heilpädagogik, ed. (1978). Neue Impulse in der Heilpädagogik. Bericht des 2. Österreichischen Heilpädagogischen Kongresses (in German).
- "Problems of infantile autism". Communication. 13: 45–52. 1979.
- "50th anniversary of the death of Clemens von Pirquet". Pädiatrie und Pädologie. 14 (2): 1–2. 1979.
- Asperger H, Haider F (1979). Selbstverlag der internationalen pädagogischen Werktagung (ed.). Kinderprobleme – Problemkinder – Tagungsbericht der 27.Werktagung 1978. Bd. 33 (in German). Salzburg. pp. 14–24.
- Selbstverlag der internationalen pädagogischen Werktagung, ed. (1980). Mit Konflikten umgehen - Tagungsbericht der 28. internationalen pädagogischen Werktagung. Bd. 34 (in German). Salzburg. pp. 56–66.
- Asperger H, Rothbucher M (1981). Selbstverlag der Internationalen Pädagogischen Werktagung (ed.). Das rechte Mass – Hilfen zur Lebensorientierung – Tagungsbericht der 29. Werktagung 1980 (in German). Salzburg. pp. 61–71.
- Asperger H, Wurst F (1982). Urban & Schwarzenberg (ed.). "Psychotherapie und Heilpädagogik bei Kindern" (in German). München, Wien, Baltimore.;
- Chapters:
  - "Schwierigkeiten Hochbegabter". Psychotherapie und... pp. 242–248.
  - "Frühkindlicher Autismus, Typ Kanner". Psychotherapie und... pp. 286–292.
  - "Kindlicher Autismus Typ Asperger". Psychotherapie und... pp. 293–301.

== Posthumous adoption of Asperger syndrome diagnosis ==
Due to his major role in defining the notion of the "autism spectrum", Hans Asperger has been "often touted as a champion of neurodiversity", particularly by Adam Feinstein and Steve Silberman. Although he died before his identification of behavioural patterns in autistic people became widely recognized, this was in part due to his work being exclusively in German and as such it was little translated.

After the Second World War and before access to the archives concerning him, Hans Asperger had a reputation as a protector of sick and handicapped children, notably under the influence of Uta Frith's book published in 1991. His earliest detractor, Eric Schopler, portrayed him instead as participating in racial hygiene programs, but without being able to provide evidence of this.

He has been portrayed as progressive and opposed to eugenics under the Nazi regime, including by Lorna Wing and Steve Silberman (in his book, NeuroTribes, published in 2015). The educator Brita Schirmer, who first published about Hans Asperger's relationship with Nazism in 2002, gives her article an explicit title: "Hans Aspergers Verteidigung der 'autistischen Psychopathen' gegen die NSEgenik'", i.e. "Hans Asperger's defense of autistic psychopaths against Nazi eugenics." Helmut Gröger, on the basis of Asperger's scientific publications, concludes that he generally avoided addressing themes related to Nazi ideology, such as race.

His description of the technical contributions of the four children described in his 1944 article is initially interpreted in terms of a desire to protect them. Adam Feinstein's (2010) book argues that Asperger deliberately disseminated Nazi-friendly references in his writing in order to hide his true intent. This perception was facilitated by his self-portrait as a protector of children and a resister. In his 1974 interview, Asperger stated that when "the time for National Socialism came, it was clear from my previous life that one could well accept many 'national' things, but not inhumanity (Unmenschlichkeiten)." John Donvan and Caren Zucker's book, In A Different Key, is according to Czech, who shared some of her sources with the authors, "the first publication in the English language to break with the narrative of Asperger as an active opponent of Nazi racial hygiene and to introduce hitherto unknown critical elements into the debate."

=== Translation of Asperger's work in the late 20th century ===
English researcher Lorna Wing proposed the condition Asperger's syndrome in a 1981 paper, Asperger's syndrome: a clinical account, that challenged the previously accepted model of autism presented by Leo Kanner in 1943. It was not until 1991 that an authoritative translation of Asperger's work was made by Uta Frith; before this, Asperger's syndrome had still been "virtually unknown". Frith says that fundamental questions regarding the diagnosis had not been answered, and the necessary scientific data to address this did not exist.In the early 1990s, Asperger's work gained some notice due to Wing's research on the subject and Frith's recent translation, leading to the inclusion of the eponymous condition in the International Statistical Classification of Diseases and Related Health Problems 10th revision (ICD-10) in 1993, and the American Psychiatric Association's Diagnostic and Statistical Manual of Mental Disorders 4th revision (DSM-IV) in 1994, some half a century after Asperger's original research. In Asperger's 1944 paper, as Frith translated in 1991, he wrote: "We are convinced, then, that autistic people have their place in the organism of the social community. They fulfill their role well, perhaps better than anyone else could, and we are talking of people who as children had the greatest difficulties and caused untold worries to their caregivers." Based on Frith's translation, however, Asperger initially stated: "Unfortunately, in the majority of cases the positive aspects of autism do not outweigh the negative ones." Psychologist Eric Schopler wrote in 1998: "Asperger's publications did not inspire research, replication, or scientific interest before 1980. Instead, he laid the fertile groundwork for the diagnostic confusion that has grown since 1980."

Despite this brief resurgence of interest in his work in the 1990s, Asperger's syndrome remained a controversial and contentious diagnosis due to its unclear relationship to the autism spectrum.

=== Perceptions of Asperger's work in the 21st century ===
In 2010, there was a majority consensus to subsume Asperger's syndrome into the diagnosis "Autistic Spectrum Disorder" in the 2013 DSM-5 diagnostic manual. The World Health Organization's ICD-10 Version 2015 describes Asperger's syndrome as “a disorder of uncertain nosological validity”.

Czech was the first to study the issue of Hans Asperger's Jewish patients. While Asperger did not express overtly anti-Semitic ideas, his public statements and Asperger's treatment of his Jewish patients show an indifference to the persecution suffered by this population. He also seems to have internalized at least some of the anti-Jewish stereotypes of his time.

Czech and Sheffer believe that Hans Asperger's diagnoses are sexist, while Dean Falk refutes that Hans Asperger was sexist.

Sheffer devotes a chapter of her book to the differences between the diagnoses of boys and girls. According to Claude Grimal's review in the journal, it should not be considered surprising that Asperger's diagnoses contain "all the gender biases of the time".

Czech notes that Hans Asperger's gender bias leads to "disadvantaging girls in terms of sexual abuse and precociousness", adding that he blames victims of sexual abuse. Czech cites, in particular, the example of the diagnosis of a 12-year-old Jewish girl, who, according to Asperger, "acted like a madwoman, talked about anti-Jewish persecution, was afraid". Asperger interpreted these signs of distress as symptoms of schizophrenia, and concluded his report, "for her age and race, sexual development is visibly retarded".

In Steve Silberman's first edition of his book, in 2015, before the publication of the archives studied by Czech, Silberman openly supports Asperger's work, postulating that, if Asperger's syndrome had been used as the basis for defining autism in the twentieth century, rather than Leo Kanner's infantile autism, autistic individuals and their families would have avoided a great deal of suffering, positive criteria would have been used for diagnosis rather than deficits, and financial resources would have been allocated more quickly to supporting autistic individuals themselves rather than to seeking therapies and cures.

According to Czech, it is from April 2018 onwards that Hans Asperger's legacy is seriously questioned, notably through an editorial and press release distributed by, widely reported in the media, and then by the publication of Edith Sheffer's book a few weeks later. This gave rise to some sensationalist media exaggerations concerning the true role of Asperger's. Silberman reconsidered his position, pointing out that autistic people who once saw Hans Asperger as an ally probably felt betrayed, and updated new editions of his book.

In Asperger's Children, historian Edith Sheffer argues for the abandonment of the notion of "Asperger's syndrome". After reading this book, Judy Sasha Rubinsztein says she is "convinced not to use the term 'Asperger's Syndrome' because it raises the spectre of that barbaric time when medical values were distorted to support Nazi ideology". Simon Baron-Cohen states that, in light of Czech and Sheffer's findings, "we now need to revise our views, and probably our language as well", by no longer referring to "Asperger's syndrome" but only to "autism". In contrast, the American journalist Seth Mnookin does not agree with Sheffer's conclusion, which he analyzes as an attempt to deconstruct the notion of autism by falsely making it sound like a "Nazi invention".

The reactions of autistic people to the revelations about Hans Asperger's past are varied: some are attached to the terminology of "Asperger's syndrome", while others testify in favour of abandoning this name. This is notably the case of the doctor of philosophy Josef Schovanec, who states:

Even more than his links with Nazism, it is what must have been Dr. Asperger's strong point that will seal his doom, namely his ability to sort out children among humans.

- Josef Schovanec

Since 2022, academic studies have provided a reassessment of Hans Asperger’s role during the Nazi period. According to Ernst Tatzer and Klaus Schepker & Christine Freitag, Asperger did not violate professional medical ethics, contrary to claims made in 2018. The documents analyzed indicate that he was not responsible for the deaths of children sent to the Am Spiegelgrund institution and highlight the responsibility of other physicians. These findings offer a more nuanced perspective compared to some sensationalized portrayals, while acknowledging the complex historical context in which Asperger worked.

=== Hypothesis that Hans Asperger himself had Asperger's syndrome ===
In 2007, Viktoria Lyons and Michael Fitzgerald, a controversial expert in retrospective diagnosis, hypothesized that Hans Asperger himself had Asperger's syndrome, as they believed that as a child he exhibited features of the very disorder that later received his name. The article is based on a German newsletter and on the book by Uta Frith, published in 1991.

Hans Asperger’s daughter, Dr. Maria Asperger, stated that her father was extremely reserved, had few but intense interests, and was clumsy in his movements—traits that some authors have associated with Asperger syndrome.

This hypothesis was taken up by the investigative journalist Steve Silberman and by Élisabeth Roudinesco, who asserted that Hans Asperger was affected during his childhood by the syndrome he later described. It is refuted by Sheffer, who believes that the diagnostic criteria for Asperger's syndrome are irrelevant (and even less so in retrospect), but also that Asperger's "severe criticism" of "autistic psychopaths" precludes the possibility that he would have considered applying a diagnosis that he judged so negatively to himself.
