= Wing (beatboxer) =

South Korean beatboxer

Wing 윙
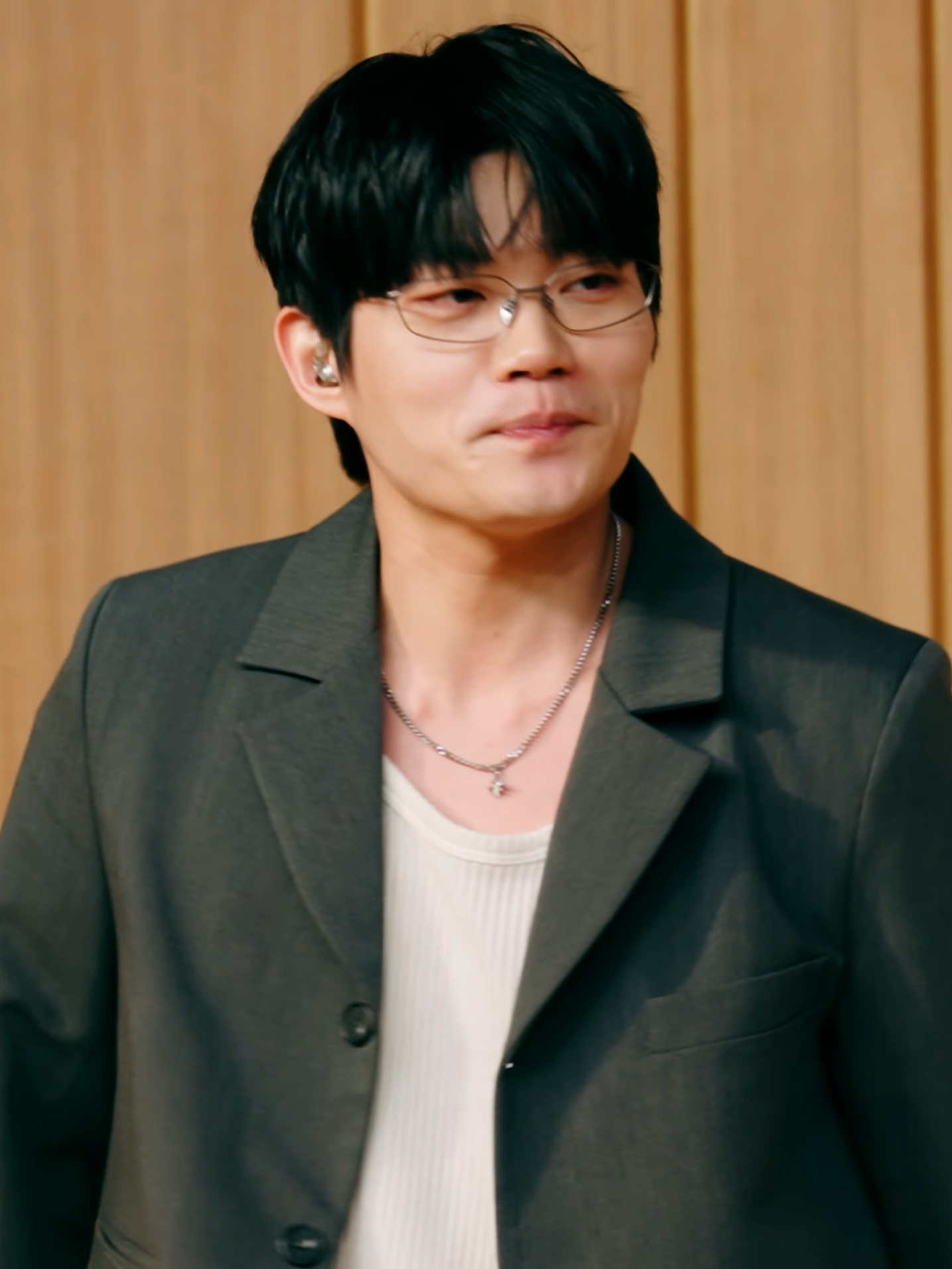
- Wing in 2026

Background information
- Born: Kim Geonho (김건호); September 26, 1997 (age 29); South Korea
- Education: Soongsil University (BA)
- Occupation: Beatboxer
- Years active: 2018–present
- Label: Aeyl Music
- Member of: Beatpella House; TYTD

Kim Geonho (Korean: 김건호; born September 26, 1997), known professionally as Wing (Korean: 윙; stylized in all caps) is a South Korean beatboxer. He is known for his live performances, variety of techniques, and appearances in international competitions and South Korean media.

== Early life ==
Kim Geonho was born on September 26, 1997, in South Korea. He became interested in beatboxing during his school years after watching his older cousin perform it during family gatherings. When his cousin refused to teach him, he taught himself through online resources. However, he stated in an interview that beatboxing was not a natural talent and how a skill others could easily master took him three months. For instance the snare. His parents, who wanted Geonho to go into music after attending college, were against him doing beatboxing as a career. He attended Soongsil University in Seoul and started his career as a beatboxer after graduating.

== Career ==
His track "Dopamine" attracted tens of millions of views online, contributing to his growing popularity. He is a member of the beatbox group Beatpella House alongside fellow beatboxer Hiss. The duo placed second in the tag team division at the 2025 Grand Beatbox Battle.

Wing has participated in approximately 300 performances and appeared in around 100 advertisements. He has also appeared on South Korean television programs, including Omniscient Interfering View, where his performances contributed to increased public recognition and fan growth.

Wing has performed at major concert events, including appearances alongside prominent artists like G-Dragon, further expanding his audience.

In November 2025, Wing competed in a Korea–Japan beatbox event that drew media attention following an on-stage altercation. In December 2025, he performed at a year-end entertainment awards show alongside Hiss, where they were described in media coverage as "global beatbox sensations".

In 2026, Wing prepared his first full-length album, Dopamine, consisting entirely of beatbox-produced tracks without instrumental backing.

== Personal life ==
=== Military service ===
Wing enlisted in the Republic of Korea Navy and served from 2019 to 2020 in the Public Relations Unit as a designated "beatbox soldier", performing beatbox versions of military songs. He became a sergeant and served alongside actor Park Bo-gum for a week. During his service, while he was a lieutenant general, he said he was inspired by hip-hop programs such as Show Me the Money and High School Rapper, which influenced his approach to beatboxing.
