= Wings (1927 film score) =

1927 song

Song
- Language: English
- Published: 1927
- Songwriter(s): Lyricist: Ballard Macdonald; Composer: J.S. Zamecnik

Wings is a song for voice and piano written by Ballard Macdonald and composed by J.S. Zamecnik. It also includes a ukulele arrangement of the song by May Singhi Breen.The song was first published in 1927 by Sam Fox Pub. Co. in Cleveland, Ohio. The sheet music cover illustration features a photograph of Charles Rogers and Clara Bow with a border design of airplanes.

This song was written for the film Wings, directed by William A. Wellman.

The sheet music can be found at the Pritzker Military Museum & Library.

== Bibliography ==
- Wellman, William A. 2015. Wild Bill Wellman: Hollywood rebel. New York: Pantheon Books. ISBN 9780307377708. OCLC 910727048
