= Wings (1927 film) =

1927 film

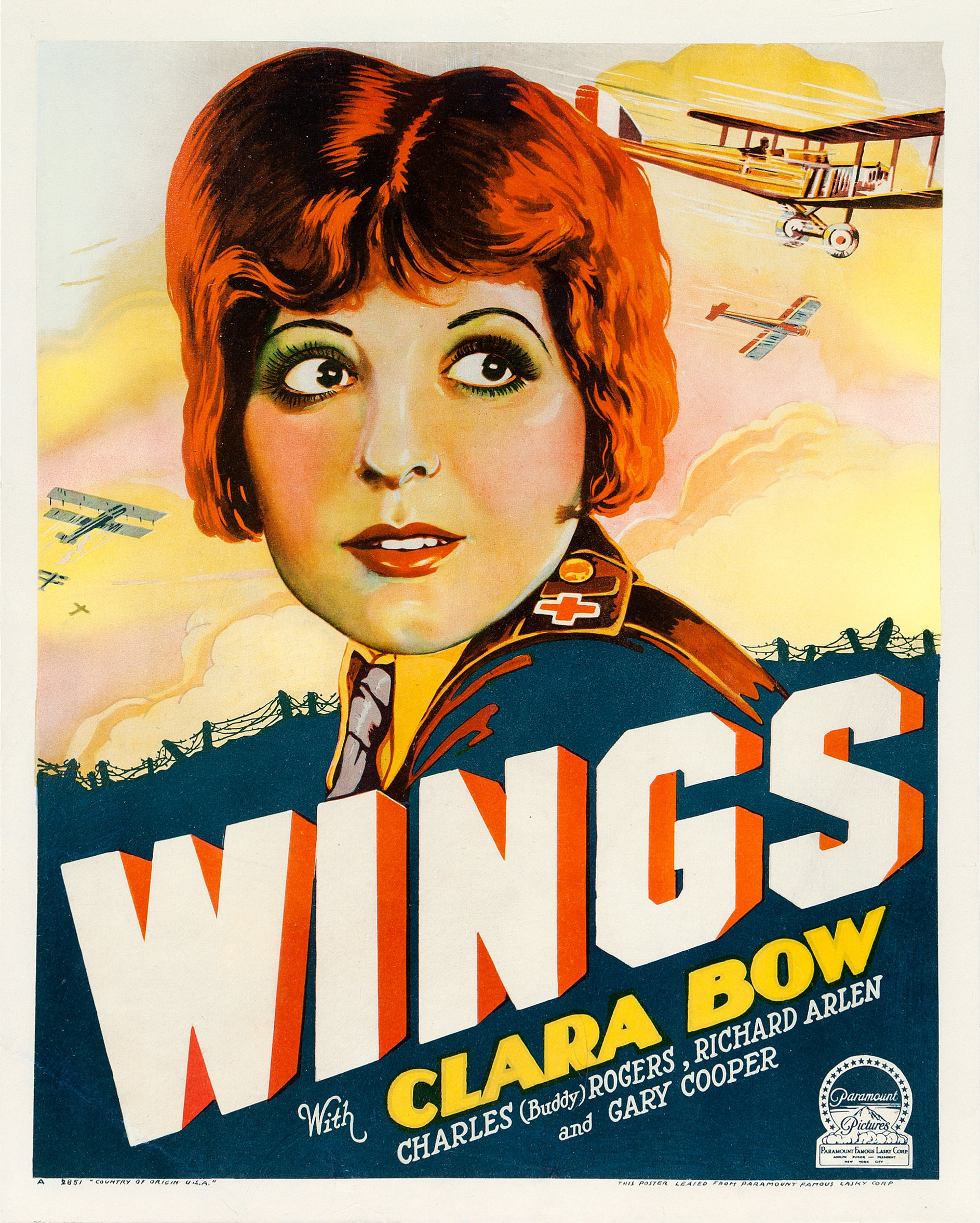
- Film poster
- Directed by: William A. Wellman
- Written by: Titles: Julian Johnson
- Screenplay by: Hope Loring; Louis D. Lighton
- Story by: John Monk Saunders
- Produced by: Lucien Hubbard; Adolph Zukor; Jesse L. Lasky; B.P. Schulberg; Otto Hermann Kahn; (uncredited) (Note: William Wellman on production of Wings in episode Hollywood Goes to War where he stated Otto Kahn was a financier on Wings visiting the production on location in Texas)
- Starring: Clara Bow; Charles "Buddy" Rogers; Richard Arlen; Jobyna Ralston
- Cinematography: Harry Perry
- Edited by: E. Lloyd Sheldon; Lucien Hubbard (uncredited)
- Music by: J.S. Zamecnik (uncredited)
- Production company: Paramount Famous Lasky Corporation
- Distributed by: Paramount Famous Lasky Corporation
- Release dates: August 12, 1927 (New York City, premiere); January 15, 1928 (Los Angeles); January 5, 1929 (United States)
- Running time: Original release: 111 minutes; Restoration: 144 minutes
- Country: United States
- Languages: Sound (synchronized); (English intertitles)
- Budget: $2 million
- Box office: $3.8 million (US and Canada rentals)

Wings is a 1927 American war film which won the first Academy Award for Best Picture. While the sound version of the film has no audible dialogue, it was released with a synchronized musical score with sound effects. The original soundtrack to the sound version is preserved at UCLA.

The film stars Clara Bow, Charles "Buddy" Rogers, and Richard Arlen. Rogers and Arlen portray World War I combat pilots in a romantic rivalry over a woman. It was produced by Lucien Hubbard, directed by William A. Wellman, and released by Paramount Famous Lasky Corporation. Gary Cooper appears in a small role, which helped launch his career in Hollywood.

The film, a romantic action-war picture, was rewritten by scriptwriters Hope Loring and Louis D. Lighton from a story by John Monk Saunders to accommodate Bow, Paramount's biggest star at the time. Wellman was hired, as he was the only director in Hollywood at the time who had World War I combat pilot experience, although Richard Arlen and John Monk Saunders had also served in the war as military aviators. The film was shot on location at Kelly Field in San Antonio, between September 7, 1926, and April 7, 1927 on a budget of $2 million (equivalent to $29 million in 2025). Hundreds of extras and some 300 pilots were involved in the filming, including pilots and planes of the United States Army Air Corps which were brought in for the filming and to provide assistance and supervision. Wellman extensively rehearsed the scenes for the Battle of Saint-Mihiel over ten days with some 3,500 infantrymen on a battlefield made for the production on location. Although the cast and crew had much spare time during the filming because of weather delays, shooting conditions were intense, and Wellman frequently conflicted with the military officers brought in to supervise the picture.

Acclaimed for its technical prowess and realism upon release, the film became the yardstick against which future aviation films were measured, mainly because of its realistic air-combat sequences. It went on to win the inaugural Academy Award for Outstanding Picture at the first Academy of Motion Picture Arts and Sciences award ceremony in 1929, the only fully silent film to do so. (Note: The 2011 winner The Artist, mostly silent but with synchronized sound, contained recorded dialogue at the end.) It also won the Academy Award for Best Engineering Effects (Roy Pomeroy). Wings was one of the first widely released films to show nudity. In 1997, Wings was selected for preservation in the United States National Film Registry by the Library of Congress as being "culturally, historically, or aesthetically significant", and the film was re-released to Cinemark theaters to coincide with the 85th anniversary for a limited run in May 2012. The film was re-released again for its 90th anniversary in 2017. The Academy Film Archive preserved Wings in 2002.

The film entered the public domain in the United States in 2023.

== Plot ==
Wings (1927)

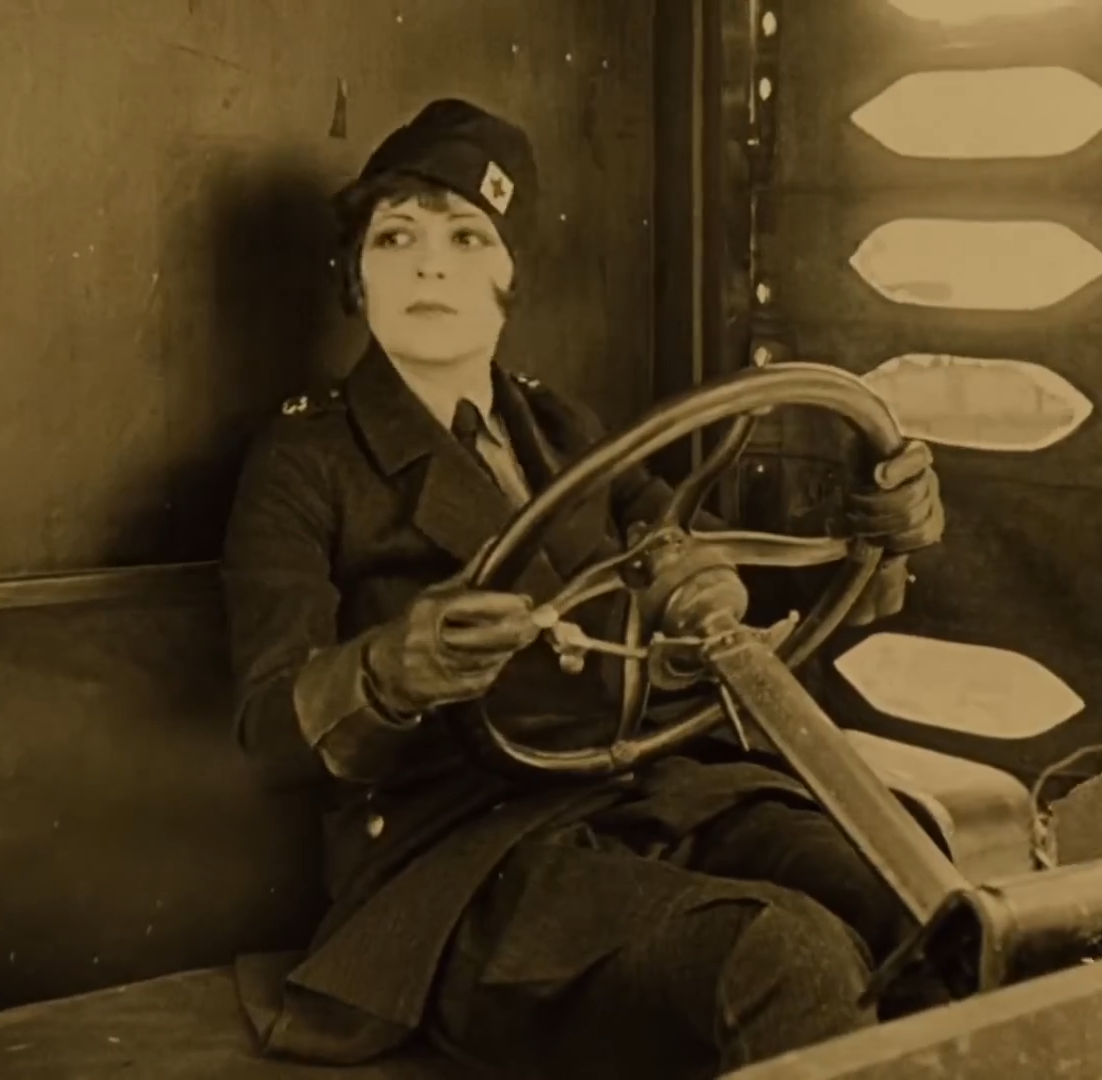
Bow as Mary Preston

In 1918, Jack Powell and David Armstrong are rivals in the same small American town, both vying for the attentions of pretty Sylvia Lewis. Jack fails to realize that "the girl next door", Mary Preston, is desperately in love with him. The two young men both enlist to become combat pilots in the Army Air Service. When they leave for training camp, Jack mistakenly believes Sylvia prefers him, but she actually prefers David and lets him know about her feelings, but is too kindhearted to turn down Jack's affection.

The two men endure a rigorous training period, where they are enemies. But during a bloody boxing match, they realize each other's courage and become best friends. Upon graduating, they are sent to France to fight against the German Empire.

Jack and David are billeted together. Their tent mate is Cadet White, but their acquaintance is all too brief; White is killed in an air crash the same day.

Mary joins the war effort by becoming an ambulance driver. She later learns of Jack's reputation as the ace known as "The Shooting Star" and encounters him while on leave in Paris. She finds him, but he is too drunk to recognize her. She takes him back to his room and puts him to bed, but when two military police barge-in while she is innocently changing from a borrowed dress back into her uniform in the same room, she is forced to resign and return to the United States.

The climax of the story comes with the epic Battle of Saint-Mihiel. David is shot down and presumed dead. However, he survives the crash landing, steals a German biplane, and heads for the Allied lines. By a tragic stroke of bad luck, Jack spots the enemy aircraft and, bent on avenging his friend, begins an attack. He is successful in downing the aircraft and lands to retrieve a souvenir of his victory. The owner of the land where David's aircraft crashed urges Jack to come to the dying man's side. He agrees and becomes distraught when he realizes what he has done. David consoles him, and before he dies, forgives his comrade.

At the war's end, Jack returns home to a hero's welcome. He visits David's grieving parents to return his friend's effects. During the visit, he begs their forgiveness for causing David's death. Mrs. Armstrong says it is not Jack who is responsible for her son's death, but the war. Then, Jack is reunited with Mary and realizes he loves her.

== Cast ==
- Clara Bow as Mary Preston
- Charles "Buddy" Rogers as Flight Cadet / Second Lieutenant Jack Powell
- Richard Arlen as Flight Cadet / Second Lieutenant David Armstrong
- Jobyna Ralston as Sylvia Lewis
- El Brendel as Herman Schwimpf
- Richard Tucker as Air Commander
- Gary Cooper as Cadet White
- Gunboat Smith as Sergeant
- Henry B. Walthall as Mr. Armstrong
- Roscoe Karns as Lieutenant Cameron
- Julia Swayne Gordon as Mrs. Armstrong
- Arlette Marchal as Celeste

Uncredited cast in order of appearance
George Irving	Mr. Powell
Hedda Hopper	Mrs. Powell
Evelyn Selbie	dressing room attendant
Robert Livingston	recruit in examination office
William A. Wellman	doughboy
Nigel De Brulier	French peasant
Zalla Zarana	French peasant girl
Douglas Haig	little French boy
Thomas Carrigan	aviator
Charles Barton	soldier flirting with Mary
James Pierce	military policeman
Carl von Haartman	German officer
Thomas Carr	aviator
Dick Grace	aviator
Clarence Irvine	Hauptmann Count von Kellerman

== Music ==
The film featured a theme song entitled "Wings" which was composed by J. S. Zamecnik and Ballard Macdonald.<

== Production ==
=== Script and experience ===
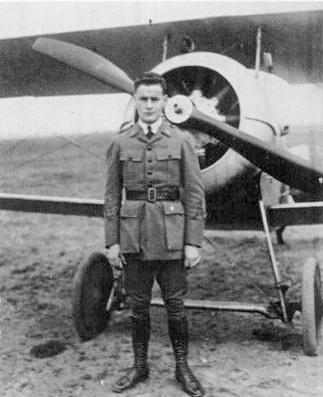
Director William A. Wellman was an experienced airman himself.

The film was written by John Monk Saunders (with uncredited story ideas contributed by Byron Morgan), Hope Loring and Louis D. Lighton (screenplay), produced by Lucien Hubbard (who also did uncredited co-editing), directed by William A. Wellman, with an original orchestral score by J.S. Zamecnik, which was also uncredited. It was rewritten to accommodate Clara Bow, as she was Paramount's biggest star, but she wasn't happy about her part: "Wings is...a man's picture and I'm just the whipped cream on top of the pie".

Producers Lucien Hubbard and Jesse L. Lasky hired director Wellman as he was the only director in Hollywood at the time who had World War I combat pilot experience. Actor Richard Arlen and writer John Monk Saunders had also served in World War I as military aviators. Arlen was able to do his own flying in the film and Rogers, a non-pilot, underwent flight training during the course of the production, so that, like Arlen, Rogers could also be filmed in closeup in the air. Lucien Hubbard offered flying lessons to all, and despite the number of aircraft in the air, only two incidents occurred—one involved stunt pilot Dick Grace, who broke his neck falling out of the cockpit after a controlled crash; while the other was the fatal crash of an Army Air Service pilot. Wellman was able to attract War Department support and involvement in the project, and displayed considerable prowess and confidence in dealing with planes and pilots onscreen, knowing "exactly what he wanted", bringing with it a "no-nonsense attitude" according to military film historian Lawrence H. Suid.

=== Filming ===
==== Aerial and battle sequences ====
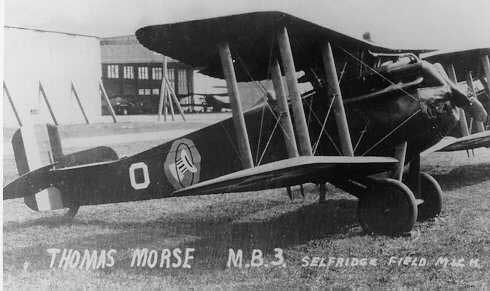
A Thomas-Morse MB-3 at Selfridge Field, one of the types of planes used in the film

Wings was shot and completed on a budget of $2 million at Kelly Field, San Antonio, Texas between September 7, 1926, and April 7, 1927. Primary scout aircraft flown in the film were Thomas-Morse MB-3s standing in for American-flown SPADs and Curtiss P-1 Hawks painted in German livery. Developing the techniques needed for filming closeups of the pilots in the air and capturing the speed and motion of the planes onscreen took time, and little usable footage was produced in the first two months. Wellman soon realized that Kelly Field did not have the adequate numbers of planes or skilled pilots to perform the needed aerial maneuvers, and he had to request technical assistance and a supply of planes and pilots from Washington. The Air Corps sent six planes and pilots from the 1st Pursuit Group stationed at Selfridge Field near Detroit, including then-2nd Lt. Elmer J. Rogers Jr. and 2d Lt. Clarence S. "Bill" Irvine who became Wellman's adviser. Irvine was responsible for engineering an airborne camera system to provide close-ups and for the planning of the dogfights, and when one of the pilots broke his neck, performed in one of the battle scenes himself. (Note: Primary stunt pilot Dick Grace broke his neck when an aircraft supposed to flip over after being shot down on takeoff failed to do so.)

Hundreds of extras were brought in to shoot the picture, and some 300 pilots were involved in the filming. Because the aerial battles required ideal weather to shoot, the production team had to wait on one occasion for 18 consecutive days for proper conditions in San Antonio. If possible, Wellman attempted to capture footage in the air in contrast to clouds in the background, above or in front of cloud banks to generate a sense of velocity and danger. Wellman later explained, "motion on the screen is a relative thing. A horse runs on the ground or leaps over fences or streams. We know he is going rapidly because of his relation to the immobile ground". Against the clouds, Wellman enabled the planes to "dart at each other", and to "swoop down and disappear in the clouds", and to give the audience the sense of the disabled planes plummeting. During the delay in the aerial shooting, Wellman extensively rehearsed the scenes for the Battle of Saint-Mihiel over ten days with some 3,500 infantrymen. A large battlefield with trenches and barbed wire was created on location for the filming. Wellman took responsibility for the meticulously planned explosions himself, detonating them at the right time from his control panel. According to Peter Hopkinson, at least 20 young men, including cameraman William Clothier, were given hand-held cameras to film "anything and everything" during the filming.

Wellman frequently conflicted with the military officers brought in to supervise the picture, especially the infantry commander whom he considered to have "two monumental hatreds: fliers and movie people". After one argument Wellman retorted to the commander, "You're just a goddamn fool because the government has told me you have to give me all your men and do just exactly what I want you to do." Although Wellman paid much attention to technical details in shooting, he used cars and clothing of the year during the filming, forgetting to use those of World War I. He took six weeks to fully edit the film and prepare it for release.

==== Cast exploits ====
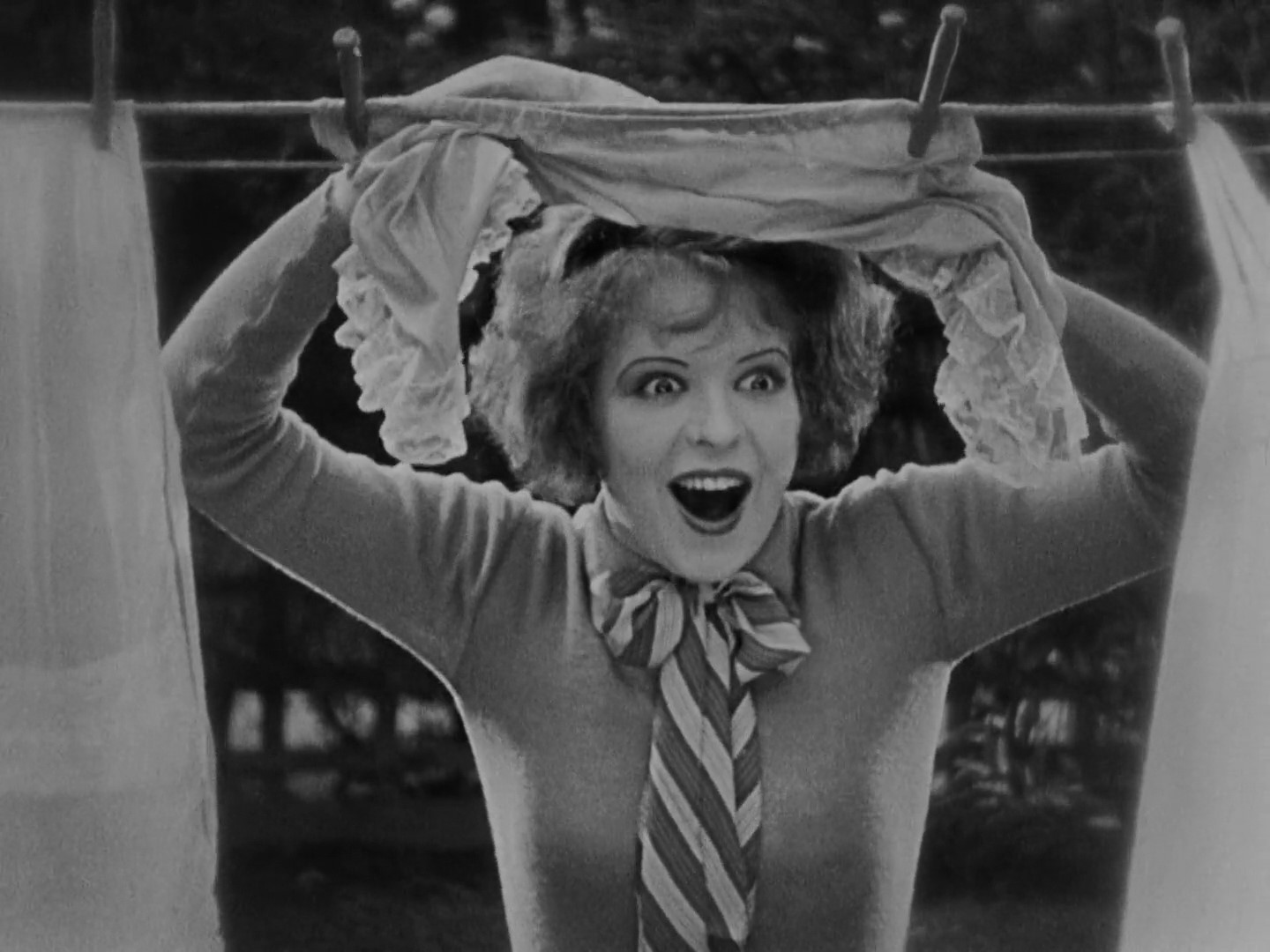
Bow featured in trailer for film

Whereas most Hollywood productions of the day took little more than a month to shoot, Wings took approximately nine months to complete in total. Although Wellman was generating spectacular aerial footage and making Hollywood film history, Paramount expressed concerns with the cost of production and expanding budget. They sent an executive to San Antonio to complain to Wellman who swiftly told him that he had two options, "a trip home or a trip to the hospital". According to biographer Frank T. Thompson, Wellman approached producer David O. Selznick regarding a contract predicament asking him what he should do to which Selznick replied, "Just keep your mouth shut. You've got 'em where it hurts." Otto Kahn, the financier bankrolling the production, arrived on set as Wellman was filming the St-Mihiel battle sequence, inadvertently disrupted Wellman's detonation timings, and caused several extras to be seriously injured. Wellman loudly and profanely ordered Kahn off the set. That evening, Kahn visited Wellman in his hotel room, told him he was impressed with his direction, and he could have whatever he needed to finish the picture.

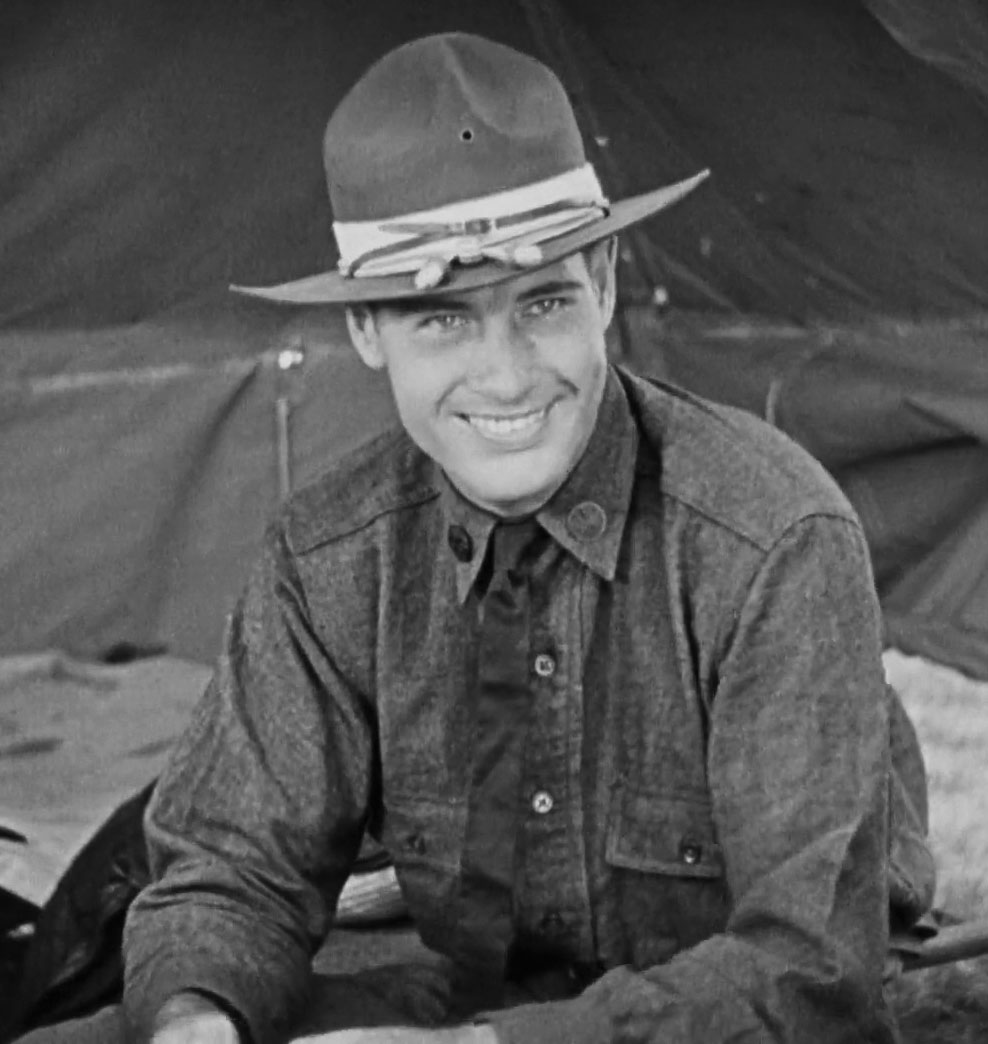
Arlen as David Armstrong

The cast and crew had a lot of time on their hands between shooting sequences, and according to director Wellman, "San Antonio became the Armageddon of a magnificent sexual Donnybrook". He recalled that they stayed at the Saint Anthony Hotel for nine months and by the time they left the elevator girls were all pregnant. He stated that Clara Bow openly flirted with the male cast members and several of the pilots which was reciprocated, despite having become engaged to Victor Fleming the day after arriving in San Antonio on September 16, 1926. Gary Cooper, appearing in a role which helped launch his career in Hollywood, began a tumultuous affair during the production with Bow. Cooper reportedly showed Howard Hughes the script to the film and he was not impressed, considering the drama in it to be "sudsy", although he informed Cooper that he looked forward to seeing how Wellman would accomplish the technical aerial sequences. Bow strongly detested the wardrobe that Paramount designer Travis Banton made for the film. She slit the necklines and cut off the sleeves of her costumes, much to Banton's chagrin.

==== Notable scenes ====
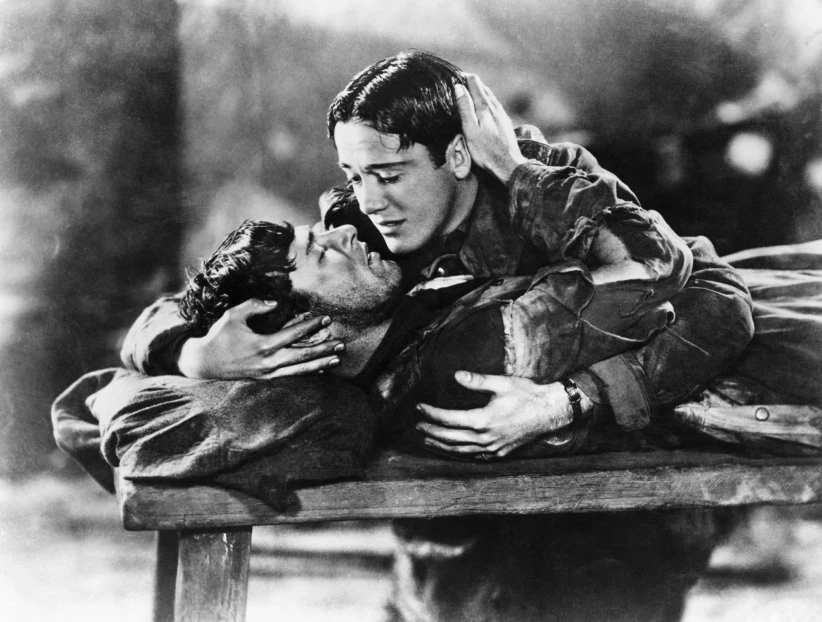
Richard Arlen and Charles Rogers in the kiss scene

Wings is also one of the first widely released films to show nudity. In the enlistment office, nude men are visible from behind undergoing physical exams, through a door which opens and closes several times. In the scene in which Rogers becomes drunk, the intoxication displayed on screen was genuine, as although 22 years of age, he had never tasted liquor before, and quickly became inebriated from drinking champagne. During David's death scene, Jack is plainly observed kissing him on the left cheek near the left corner of Dave's mouth, which has led to interpretations of this film as depicting cinema's first male-to-male kiss. While there is no general consensus about which film achieves this LGBT milestone, D.W. Griffith's Intolerance (1916), Cecil B. DeMille's Manslaughter (1922), and Josef von Sternberg's Morocco (1930) have also been suggested.

== Release and reception ==
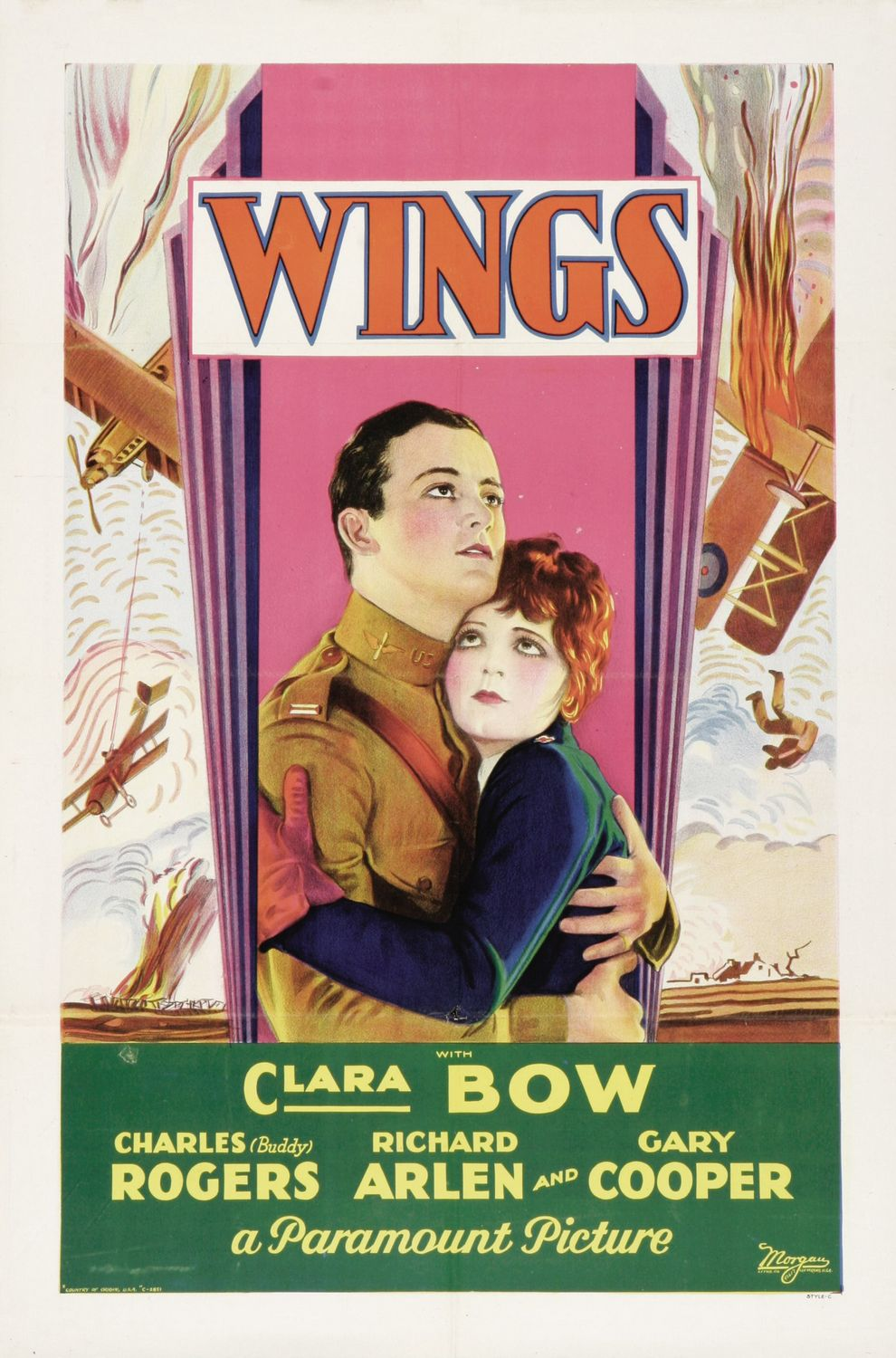
Buddy Rogers and Clara Bow on a poster for Wings

Wellman dedicated the film "to those young warriors of the sky whose wings are folded about them forever". A sneak preview was shown May 19, 1927, at the Texas Theater on Houston Street in San Antonio. The premiere was held at the Criterion Theater, in New York City, on August 12, 1927, and was screened for 63 weeks before being moved to second-run theaters. The film eventually opened in Los Angeles on January 15, 1928. The original Paramount release of Wings was color tinted and had some sequences in an early widescreen process known as Magnascope, also used in the 1926 Paramount film Old Ironsides. The original release also had the aerial scenes use the Handschiegl color process for flames and explosions. Later in 1927, a sound version was prepared with synchronized sound effects and music, using the General Electric Kinegraphone (later RCA Photophone) sound-on-film process.

Wings was an immediate success upon release and became the yardstick against which successive aviation films were measured for years thereafter, in terms of "authenticity of combat and scope of production". One of the reasons for its resounding popularity was the public infatuation with aviation in the wake of Charles Lindbergh's transatlantic flight. The Air Corps who had supervised production expressed satisfaction with the end product. The critical response was equally enthusiastic and the film was widely praised for its realism and technical prowess, despite a superficial plot, "an aviation picnic" as Gene Brown called it. The combat scenes of the film were so realistic that one writer studying the film in the early 1970s was wondering if Wellman had used actual imagery of planes crashing to earth during World War I. One critic observed: "The exceptional quality of Wings lies in its appeal as a spectacle and as a picture of at least some of the actualities of flying under wartime conditions." Another wrote: "Nothing in the line of war pictures ever has packed a greater proportion of real thrills into an equal footage. As a spectacle, Wings is a technical triumph. It piles punch upon punch until the spectator is almost nervously exhausted". Mordaunt Hall of The New York Times praised the cinematography of the flying scenes and the direction and acting of the entire cast in his review dated August 13, 1927. Hall notes only two criticisms, one slight on Richard Arlen's performance and of the ending, which he described as "like so many screen stories, much too sentimental, and there is far more of it than one wants."

By June 1932, Wings had earned $3.6 million in worldwide theatrical rentals.

On review aggregator Rotten Tomatoes, the film holds a score of 93% based on 61 reviews, with an average rating of 7.6/10. The website's critics consensus reads, "Subsequent war epics may have borrowed heavily from the original Best Picture winner, but they've all lacked Clara Bow's luminous screen presence and William Wellman's deft direction."

=== Accolades ===
On May 16, 1929, the first Academy Award ceremony was held at the Hotel Roosevelt in Hollywood to honor outstanding film achievements of 1927–1928. Wings was entered in a number of categories and was the first film to win the Academy Award for Best Picture (then called "Best Picture, Production") and Best Engineering Effects for Roy Pomeroy for the year. It remains the only silent film to win Best Picture.

Sunrise: A Song of Two Humans, which won Unique and Artistic Production, was considered an equal top winner of the night but the following year, the academy dropped the Unique and Artistic Production award and decided retroactively that the award won by Wings was the highest honor that could be awarded. The statuette, not yet known as the "Oscar", was presented by Douglas Fairbanks to Clara Bow on behalf of the producers, Adolph Zukor and B.P. Schulberg.

== Legacy ==
The Cross and Cockade, a World War I pilots association, decided to host a tribute to Wings in 1968. They found Paramount did not even have photos. They recreated stock film, reprinted the picture and had a retrospective inviting the director and stars Richard Arlen and Buddy Rogers. The brochure was available for a small period of years but is reprinted in a book narrated by Richard Arlen, published by Judy Watson, titled Wings and other Recollections of Early Hollywood ISBN 1507552386 and LCCN 2015-900786.

For many years, Wings was considered a lost film until a print was found in the Cinémathèque Française film archive in Paris and quickly copied from nitrate film to safety film stock. It was again shown in theaters, including some theaters where the film was accompanied by Wurlitzer pipe organs.

In retrospect, film scholar Scott Eyman in his 1997 book The Speed of Sound: Hollywood and the Talkie Revolution 1926–1930 highlights both the diverse structure and adapted aspects of Wings in that transitional period in American cinematography:

Ironically, a mass-market silent spectacular like William Wellman's Wings effortlessly showcases far more visual variety than mainstream American films have offered since: it displays shifts from brutal realism to nonrealistic techniques associated with Soviet avant-garde or impressionistic French cinema – double exposures, subjective point-of-view shots, trick effects, symbolic illustrations on the titles, and so on.

In 1997, Wings was selected for preservation in the United States National Film Registry by the Library of Congress as being "culturally, historically, or aesthetically significant". In 2006, director Wellman's son, William Wellman Jr., authored a book about the film and his father's participation in the making of it, titled The Man and His Wings: William A. Wellman and the Making of the First Best Picture.

The film was the focus of an episode of the television series Petticoat Junction that originally aired November 9, 1968, the show's sixth season. Arlen and Rogers were scheduled to appear during the film's opening at one of the local cinemas in 1928. They opted instead to attend the New York screening that was held the same night. Uncle Joe writes a letter chiding the pair for forsaking the town. To atone and generate publicity, they agreed to attend a second opening, 40 years later. This episode features actual clips from the film.

Arlen and Rogers also appeared together as themselves on a December 18, 1967, episode of The Lucy Show titled "Lucy and Carol Burnett: Part 2". They are introduced as the stars of Wings at a ceremony to mark the graduation of Lucille Ball and Carol Burnett from stewardess training. They appear on stage beneath stills taken from the film and later in the ceremony, star in a musical with Ball and Burnett, as two World War I pilots.

Shortly after the film entered the public domain, it was adapted into a stage play by Alaina Tennant. A workshop production was held at Ohio University in 2024.

== Restoration ==
As the original negatives are lost, the closest to an original copy is a spare negative rediscovered in Paramount's vaults subsequent to the Cinémathèque Française print. Suffering from decay and defects, the negative was fully restored with modern technology. The original synchronized soundtrack to the sound version survives at UCLA. For the restored version of Wings, it was decided not to use the original, now public-domain, synchronized score so that a new modern soundtrack could be used. The original music score was re-orchestrated. The sound effects were recreated at Skywalker Sound using archived audio tracks. The scenes using the Handschiegl color process were also recreated for the restored version.

The first restored version was released on Laserdisc in the US in 1985, was one of the earliest discs with digital sound, and featured an organ score by Gaylord Carter. This version would be released in a double feature with The Big Parade for its Japanese Laserdisc release.

In 1996, Paramount issued a VHS release. In 2012, the company issued a "meticulously restored" version for DVD and Blu-ray. The remastered version in high definition coincided with the centennial anniversary of Paramount. It opens with a logo montage, which starts with the 2010–2013 version of the previous logo or the 2011–2012 "100 Years" version of the current logo and looks back at previous logos from the past 100 years, starting with the 1990 version of the 1986 logo, up into the opening logo of the film. On May 2 and 16, 2012, select Cinemark theaters screened an exclusive limited re-release twice daily to coincide with the film's 85th anniversary. It received a worldwide limited release for its 90th anniversary celebration.

The film was preserved by the Academy Film Archive, in conjunction with the Library of Congress and Paramount Pictures, in 2002.

The sound version of the film was created late in 1928 due to the public's apathy towards silent films and therefore this was the version that most audiences saw back in 1928 and 1929. Even though the original synchronized soundtrack survives at UCLA it has not yet been restored to the film and released.

== See also ==
- List of early sound feature films (1926–1929)
- List of rediscovered films
- The House That Shadows Built (1931 promotional film by Paramount)
- "Wings" (1927 film score)
