= Wing and a Prayer (disambiguation) =

Wing and a Prayer, The Story of Carrier X is a 1944 war film.

Wing and a Prayer may also refer to:

== Film and television ==
- A Wing and a Prayer (film), a 2015 television documentary film by Boaz Dvir
- A Wing and a Prayer, a 1998 TV film starring Claudia Christian
- Wing and a Prayer (TV series), a British television series starring Sean Arnold
- "A Wing and a Prayer" (Doctors), a 2004 television episode
- "A Wing and a Prayer" (Survival in the Sky), a 1996 television episode
- "A Wing and a Prayer" (Teenage Mutant Ninja Turtles), a 2005 television episode

== Music ==
- A Wing and a Prayer, a 1987 album by Matthew Kelly
- "Wing and a Prayer", a song by the Bee Gees from One
- "Wing and a Prayer", a song by Camel from Breathless
- "Wing and a Prayer", a song by the Mission from Children

== See also ==
- Wing and a Prayer Fife and Drum Corps, an American disco group
- On a Wing and a Prayer, a 1992 album by Gerry Rafferty
- "Comin' In on a Wing and a Prayer", a 1943 song by The Song Spinners, and the origin of the phrase
- On a Wing and a Prayer (film) 2023
