= Lorna Wing =

British psychiatrist and autism researcher (1928–2014)

Lorna Wing OBE FRCPsych
- Born: Lorna Gladys Tolchard; 7 October 1928; Gillingham, Kent, England
- Died: 6 June 2014 (aged 85); Bessels Green, Kent, England
- Education: University College Hospital
- Known for: Autism research
- Spouse: John Wing (m. 1950; died 2010)
- Children: 1
- Scientific career
- Fields: Psychiatry
- Workplaces: Maudsley Hospital

Lorna Gladys Wing (née Tolchard; 7 October 1928 – 6 June 2014) was a British psychiatrist who conducted research into autism. She coined the term Asperger's syndrome and helped found the National Autistic Society.

== Early life ==
Lorna Gladys Tolchard was born at Gillingham, Kent, to Royal Navy engineer Bernard Newberry Tolchard (1898–1968) and Gladys Ethel (née Whittell, died 1962). Following education at Chatham Grammar School for Girls, Lorna commenced medical training at University College Hospital in 1949. After qualifying as a psychiatrist, her first post was at the Institute of Psychiatry, Maudsley Hospital, London (now part of King's College London).

== Career ==
Wing trained as a medical doctor, specialising in psychiatry, and focused on childhood developmental disorders from 1959. At that time, autism was thought to affect between 1 in 2,000–2,500 children. Its prevalence in the 2010s was considered to be around 1 in 100 following the awareness raised by Wing and her followers. Her research, particularly with her collaborator Judith Gould, now underpins thinking in the field of autism. They initiated the Camberwell Case Register to record all patients using psychiatric services in this area of London. The data accumulated by this innovative approach gave Wing the basis for her influential insight that autism formed a spectrum, rather than clearly differentiated disorders. They also set up the Centre for Social and Communication Disorders in 1991, which was renamed to become the Lorna Wing Centre for Autism in 2008. The centre was first integrated diagnostic and advice service for social and communication conditions in the UK.

Wing was the author of many books and academic papers, including "Asperger's Syndrome: A Clinical Account", a February 1981 academic paper that popularised the research of Hans Asperger.

Along with some parents of autistic children, she founded the organisation now known as the National Autistic Society in the UK in 1962. She was a consultant to NAS Lorna Wing Centre for Autism until she died. She was also President of Autism Sussex.

In the 1995 New Year Honours list, Wing was appointed Officer of the Order of the British Empire for 'services to the National Autistic Society'.

== Personal life ==
Wing met her future husband John Wing (22 October 1923 – 18 April 2010) as medical students dissecting the same body. Marrying on 15 May 1950, both specialised as psychiatrists, with John becoming a professor of psychiatry. Following the realisation that their daughter Susie (1956–2005) was autistic, Lorna Wing became involved in researching developmental disorders, particularly autistic spectrum disorders.

Wing died of bronchopneumonia in Bessels Green, Kent, on 6 June 2014, at the age of 85.

== Hans Asperger controversy ==
Wing has faced controversy since the publication of Edith Sheffer's 2018 book, Asperger's Children, due to Wing's previous defence of using Hans Asperger's name for the "Asperger's Syndrome" diagnosis. According to a 2018 article by John Donvan for The Atlantic, Yale psychologist Fred Volkmar, another major figure in the autism field, was on the committee appointed to investigate whether "Asperger's syndrome" merited inclusion in the Diagnostic and Statistical Manual (DSM) in 1993. Volkmar phoned the only person he knew who had met Asperger — Lorna Wing — and asked her whether she knew anything of Hans Asperger's rumoured ties to the Nazis. Wing, "shocked" at Volkmar's inquiry, had defended Asperger as a "religious man". According to researcher Herwig Czech, Asperger "hailed from Roman Catholic circles, and his orientation during the period of the [previous Austrian] system was strictly Catholic".

Donvan, the author of The Atlantic article, also included this information in his 2016 book, In a Different Key: The Story of Autism, in which he described Wing as "speaking of [Hans Asperger]'s deep Catholic faith and lifelong devotion to young people", and claimed that Wing had dismissed Asperger's Nazi ties on account that "he [Asperger] was a very religious man". Prior to Wing's popularisation of "Asperger's Syndrome" in the 1980s and early 1990s, Donvan wrote, "Asperger, dead for thirteen years [by 1993], [had] never [been] a great presence on the world stage, [and] remained a little-known figure".

== Bibliography ==
=== Papers ===
- Wing, L. & Gould, J. (1979), "Severe Impairments of Social Interaction and Associated Abnormalities in Children: Epidemiology and Classification", Journal of Autism and Developmental Disorders, 9, pp. 11–29.
- Wing, L. (1980). "Childhood Autism and Social Class: a Question of Selection?", British Journal of Psychiatry, 137, pp. 410–17.
- Wing, Lorna (1981). "Asperger's Syndrome: A Clinical Account" (PDF). Psychological Medicine. 11 (1): 115–129. doi:10.1017/S0033291700053332. PMID 7208735. S2CID 16046498.
- Burgoine, E. & Wing, L. (1983), "Identical triplets with Asperger's Syndrome", British Journal of Psychiatry, 143, pp. 261–65.
- Wing, L. & Attwood, A. (1987), "Syndromes of Autism and Atypical Development", in Cohen, D. & Donnellan, A. (eds.), Handbook of Autism and Pervasive Disorders, New York, John Wiley & Sons.
- Wing, L. (1991), "The Relationship Between Asperger's Syndrome and Kanner's Autism", in Frith, U. (ed.), Autism and Asperger Syndrome, Cambridge, Cambridge University Press.
- Wing, L. (1992), "Manifestations of Social Problems in High Functioning Autistic People", in Schopler, E. & Mesibov, G. (eds.), High Functioning Individuals with Autism, New York, Plenum Press.
- Wing, L. & Potter, D. (2002). "The epidemiology of autistic spectrum disorders: is the prevalence rising?". Ment Retard Dev Disabil Res Rev. 8 (3): 151–61. doi:10.1002/mrdd.10029. PMID 12216059.

=== Books ===
- 1964, Autistic Children
- 1966, Physiological Measures, Sedative Drugs and Morbid Anxiety, with M.H. Lader
- 1969, Children Apart: Autistic Children and Their Families
- 1969, Teaching Autitistic Autistic Children: Guidelines for Teachers
- 1971, Autistic Children: a Guide for Parents
- 1975, Early Childhood Autism: Clinical, Educational and Social Aspects (editor)
- 1975, What is Operant conditioning?
- 1988, Aspects of Autism: Biological Research (editor)
- 1989, Hospital Closure and the Resettlement of Residents: Case of Darenth Park Mental Handicap Hospital
- 1995, Autistic Spectrum Disorders: an Aid to Diagnosis
- 1996, The Autistic Spectrum: a Guide for Parents and Professionals
- 2002, Smiling at Shadows: a Mother's Journey Raising an Autistic Child (with Junee Waites, Helen Swinbourne).
