= Rob Lewis (composer) =

English composer

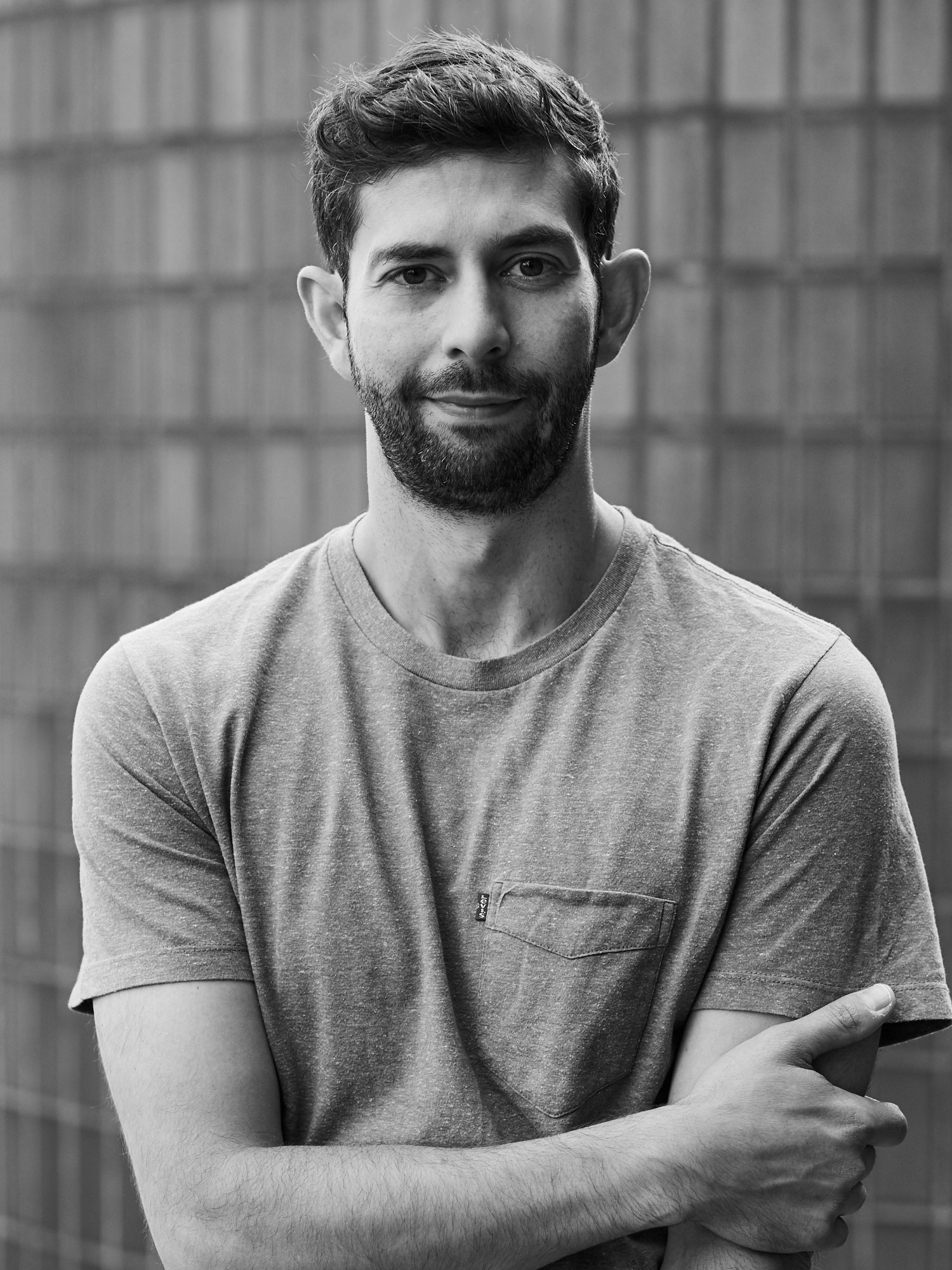

Background information
- Born: 2 November 1982 (age 42); London, England
- Genres: Classical; electronic; ambient; contemporary classical
- Occupations: Composer; cellist; record producer
- Instruments: Cello; piano; guitar
- Years active: 2005–present
- Labels: AWAL; The Ambient Zone; Just Music
- Website: roblewiscomposer.com

Rob Lewis (born 2 November 1982) is an Emmy nominated English composer, producer and multi-instrumentalist. He gained critical acclaim for his compositions for looping cello, which formed the basis of his album "Momentum" released in 2018. In 2019, Lewis was commissioned by Google to compose a 60-minute soundtrack as part of an installation in Los Angeles. Excerpts from this composition formed his second album, "98", which was released in February 2020. In April 2022, he premiered "Tideway Tunnel To Tide", a composition created using sounds from the Tideway Tunnelling Construction process, as a live-streamed event. The work was subsequently released as a single in connection with the Thames Tideway Tunnel project.

== TV and film ==
Lewis has composed soundtracks for numerous television shows and films, including the Netflix series Mysteries of the Faith, for which he received an Emmy nomination in the category of Outstanding Musical Direction and Composition. He also composed the music for Hulu's Dead Asleep directed by Skye Borgman, Channel 4's Inside the American Embassy, Genderquake, and the independent feature documentary '‘Perception'’ following the work of Egyptian artist El Seed. He has also collaborated with BAFTA winner David Holmes. He partnered with augmented reality company Magic Leap on their first in-house narrative film The Last Light due for showing at SXSW festival. In 2017 he scored H&M and Erdem's joint campaign directed by Baz Luhrmann.

== Education ==
Lewis began playing the cello at the age of 6. He read music at University of Sussex, and cello at The Guildhall School of Music and Drama with teacher Selma Gokcen. He has taken masterclasses with Bernard Greenhouse, Raphael Wallfisch, and Karine Georgian.

== Recordings ==
Released in 2018, his debut album Momentum is a collection of 10 tracks for looping cello inspired by nature, humanity and the constant strife between the two. The album received support on BBC 6 Music from Mary Anne Hobbs and Tom Ravenscroft. It was also described as "Strikingly Beautiful" by Clash magazine.

Momentum was featured in the show ‘Harmonic’, performed at Kew Gardens, London in the summer of 2018. The show was created by Cirque Bijou and featured aerialist Korri Aulakh. It was subsequently performed in Shanghai in 2019 and Bristol Harbour Festival. Lewis also performed Momentum at WOMAD festival. The Ambient Zone also released two remixed versions of tracks from Momentum. "The Sea" from the album was captured as part of the 'Unpicked' series, recorded at Abbey Road Studios.

Lewis's second album 98 centres around the concept of cell regeneration and the evolution of mankind, with each track focusing on a different area of the human mind and body. It forms part of the 60-minute score Lewis composed for Google's Room 98.

Lewis's third studio album Dialogue In Bloom was released in 2024, based around the idea of using AI as a writing companion rather than as a replacement for human creativity.

Music from his commercial releases has been used on a number of TV shows and films including Netflix's Chef's Table. Lewis's compositions have also featured on fashion shows by Gucci, Givenchy and Alexander McQueen

== Tunnel To Tide ==
Lewis was commissioned to compose a new work entitled "Tunnel To Tide" for the Thames Tideway Scheme, a major infrastructure project designed to prevent sewage from entering the River Thames in London.

The composition, which premiered in April 2022, is a single piece that celebrates the ecological and social impact of the Thames Tideway Tunnel. The work features a variety of musical styles and instrumentation, including traditional orchestral elements, electronic sounds, and recordings of sounds from the Tideway Tunnelling construction process.

Lewis drew inspiration for the composition from the engineering feats required to build the Tideway Tunnel and the positive impact it will have on the River Thames. The work explores different aspects of the project, from the tunnel construction process to the eventual cleaner waters of the river.

The premiere of "Tideway Tunnel To Tide" was live-streamed worldwide and received widespread critical acclaim. The composition has been praised for its ability to capture the complex relationship between humans and the environment. In connection with the Thames Tideway Tunnel project, "Tideway Tunnel To Tide" was also released as a single. The work was featured in numerous major media outlets, including: Evening Standard,The Independent, The Times, The Guardian. Lewis has described the commission as a unique opportunity to combine his love of music with his interest in environmental issues.

== Cellist ==
As a session musician and artist, Lewis has performed and collaborated with artists including Noel Gallagher, Anna Calvi, Dave, SBTRKT, Ghostpoet, Beardyman, Jason Mraz, Massive Attack and many more. He is endorsed by Yamaha Music.

== SmartScales iOS App ==
In 2015 Lewis co-founded Greater Heights Media to create the award-winning app ‘SmartScales’ . The App aims to make learning scales and arpeggios more accessible and enjoyable. In 2016, Apple made it ’Best New App’, and the app reached number 15 in the US and Asia app charts. The app also received five-star reviews from The Strad magazine, BBC Music Magazine and Sinfini Music.

=== Awards and nominations ===
Year	Nominee / work	Award	Result	Year	Category	Nominee	Work	Award	Result
2024	Rob Lewis / Mysteries Of The Faith	Outstanding Musical Direction and Composition	Nominated						
