= Reeps One =

British vocal artist and performer

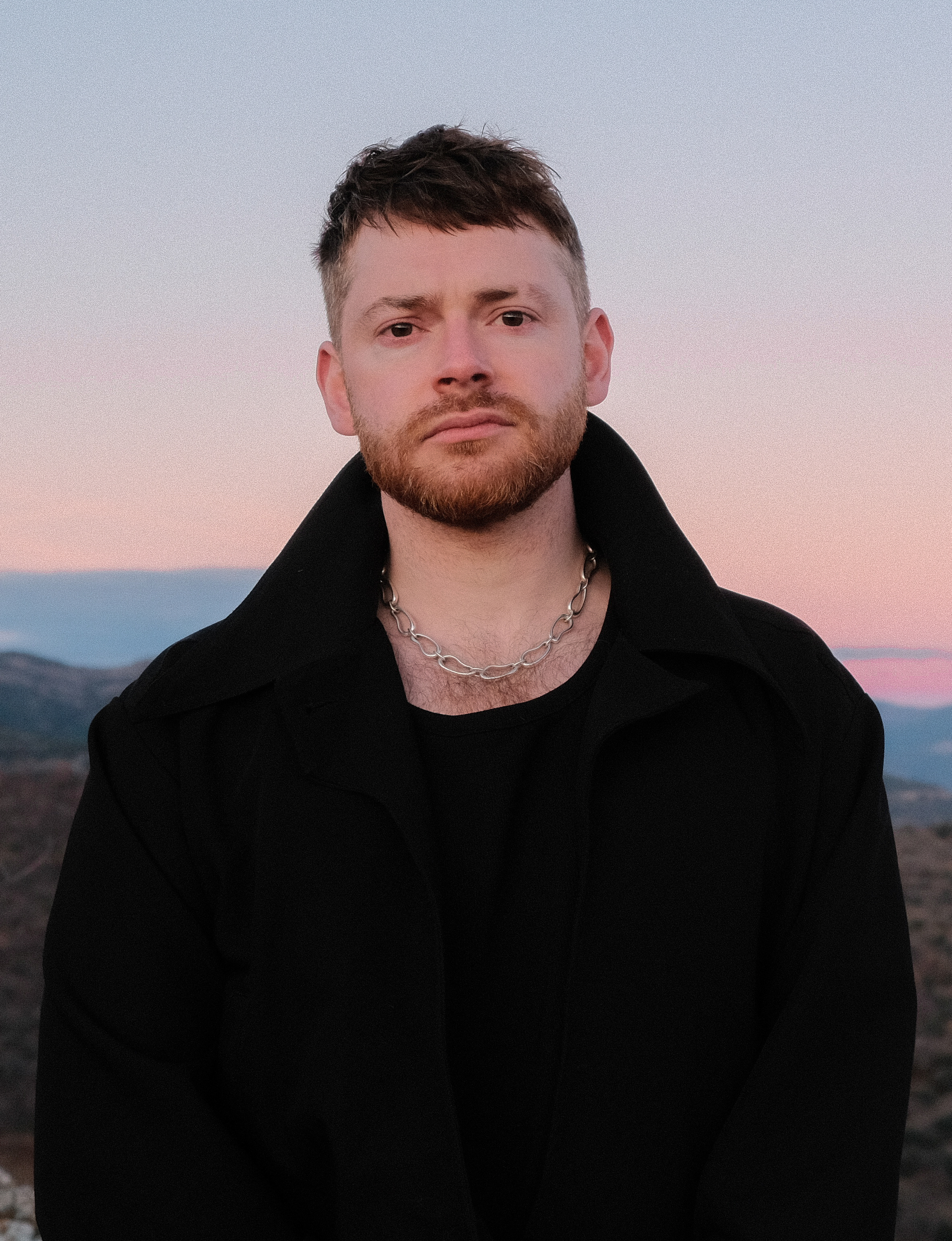
- Harry Yeff in 2023

Background information
- Also known as: Reeps100
- Born: Harry Yeff; 18 November 1989 (age 36)
- Origin: London, England
- Genres: Vocal music; experimental
- Occupations: Artist; composer
- Instrument: Human Voice
- Website: reeps100.com

Harry Yeff (born 18 November 1989), known professionally as Reeps One, is a British vocal artist and beatboxer based in London. His work combines vocal performance with digital technology.

== Career ==
In 2020, Reeps One joined the Experiments in Art and Technology program at Bell Labs researching creative applications for A.I. and machine learning. In collaboration with Bell Labs and Simon Weldon, Reeps One wrote 'We Speak Music', a documentary culminating is a musical 'chess match' involving a performance with an A.I artist twin called 'Second Self', performed in the anechoic chamber located at Bell Labs New Jersey.

Reeps One won the UK Beatbox Championships in 2009 and successfully defended the title in 2010.

In November 2018, Reeps One was a co-author to the paper 'Beatboxers and guitarists engage sensorimotor regions selectively when listening to the instruments', published by Oxford Academic.

By 2019, Reeps One completed his third artist residency at Harvard University and is currently part of the Experiments in Art and Technology program at Bell Labs. Reeps One produces work as a response to an ongoing investigation into the evolution of the human voice, art, and technology.

During a TED Talk during 2019, Reeps One mentioned that he has the fastest recorded use of the human diaphragm. He discovered this during his time with Dr. Sophie Scott during the making of the We Speak Music documentary with Nokia Bell Labs, where they used an MRI to observe his diaphragm while using his signature beatbox technique, the Inward Drag.

Reeps One has collaborated with a diverse selection of artists and institutions including Damon Albarn, Mike Patton, the University College and the United Nations. In January 2020, Reeps One directed and performed 'Voices Of Light' to close the 2020 World Economic Forum annual meeting. Later that year, Yeff was asked to conduct the 30-minute closing performance of the first day of GitHub Universe. It was titled A new virtuoso: when AI is both an opponent and a collaborator and featured five pieces in which he beatboxed to and interacted with syntactic voices created by Machine learning models.

In May 2023 Reeps One directed the world's first A.I-driven International Ballet in collaboration with Leipzig Opera House.

In January 2024 Reeps One performed a human and machine collaboration work at TIME Magazine 100 Most Influential People in A.I. event at Museum of the Future, Dubai
