= Max Hole =

British music industry executive

- Born: Christopher Charles Maximilian Hole; 26 May 1951 (age 75); London, England
- Occupations: Chairman & CEO of Universal Music Group International
- Spouse: Jan Ravens (m. 1999)
- Children: 3

Christopher Charles Maximilian Hole CBE (born 26 May 1951) is a British music industry executive who has been the chairman and CEO of UMGI (International division of Universal Music Group) since 1 January 2013. He previously held the role of chief operating officer for UMGI (International division of Universal Music Group) of which he occupied since 1 July 2010. As head of central functions at UMGI's headquarters in London, he is also responsible for operations in territories and regions worldwide. He was referred to in Billboard as "a serious contender for title of 'most powerful label executive outside America.'"

== Career ==
Max Hole began his career in the music industry in 1972 as founder with Geoff Jukes of Gemini Artists, an agency and management business, representing such musicians as Martin Carthy, Camel, Mungo Jerry and Arthur Brown. In 1982, he was a manager in the artists and repertoire department at WEA. In 1990, he moved up to managing director for East West Records where he was closely involved with the career of Simply Red, among others. After sixteen years with Warners, in 1998, he took the position of senior vice-president for marketing and A&R for Universal Music's international division. He became executive vice-president in 2004, overseeing the promotion and marketing of artists including Bon Jovi, Amy Winehouse, Snow Patrol, Justin Bieber, Andrea Bocelli, Juanes, U2, Eminem, Gwen Stefani, Shania Twain, and Bryan Adams and also assuming responsibility for Universal's Asia/Pacific business. In 2010, he was appointed COO of UMG International following the appointment of the division's chairman, Lucian Grainge, to CEO of Universal Music Group. In January 2013, he was promoted to chairman & CEO of UMGI.

== Classical music ==
Hole also currently oversees Universal's worldwide classical business and therefore has been a major force behind the company's drive to "assert its classical music leadership as never before". He has been instrumental in a number of high-profile signings, in particular the conductor and pianist Daniel Barenboim, who signed to DG and Decca Classics in late 2010 As C.O.O., Hole instigated the relocation of Deutsche Grammophon to Berlin, and the relaunch of Decca Classics in London.

As part of the reinvigoration of these two labels, and reflecting his passion for popularising classical music, particularly among younger recorded music buyers, he oversaw the signing and development of a number of new artists, including classical guitarist Milos Karadaglic to DG.

Hole worked in collaboration with Bristol Old Vic artistic director Tom Morris on the Bristol Proms, a programme of live classical performances and collaborations featuring Nicola Benedetti, Clare Reddington and others.

As C.O.O., Hole pioneered digital distribution in classical markets with the launch of Sinfini Music, an information resource and e-commerce portal for classical music.

== Asian markets ==
Hole spent much of the last decade as head of UMG's Asia Pacific region, and is one of the industry's most experienced executives in this part of the world. He steered Universal Music Japan's transition into a domestic-music powerhouse, and has facilitated significant deals with independent Asian music companies to promote homegrown talent, including Taiwan's Rock Records in 2008 and South Korea's Play Cube Entertainment in 2010. He led Universal's renewed investment in the latter country after seven years away – a decision validated by the South Korean recorded music sector's return to growth, as reflected in the 2010 IFPI digital music report.

Moreover, Hole was a founding father of the license deal between One Stop China, a joint venture with Warner and Sony, and China's No. 1 search engine Baidu, for its new music download service in July. The agreement has seen the One Stop China partners license Baidu to offer more than 500,000 songs for download to Chinese music fans. The search engine had previously been a major source of internet piracy.

== Recent activity ==
Hole was placed No. 16 on The Guardian and Observer's 'Music Power 100' in 2011.

Hole was instrumental in securing UMGI's deal with John de Mol's Talpa Media for The Voice Of…, a reality TV property similar to X Factor. Talpa has agreed to give UMG exclusive rights to record and promote artists emerging from it. The format attracted 3.2m viewers during its run in the Netherlands.

He was appointed CBE in the 2015 Birthday Honours.

== Personal life ==
Hole and English actress and impressionist, Jan Ravens, have been married since 1999 and have a son.
