= SungBeats =

Beatboxer and busker

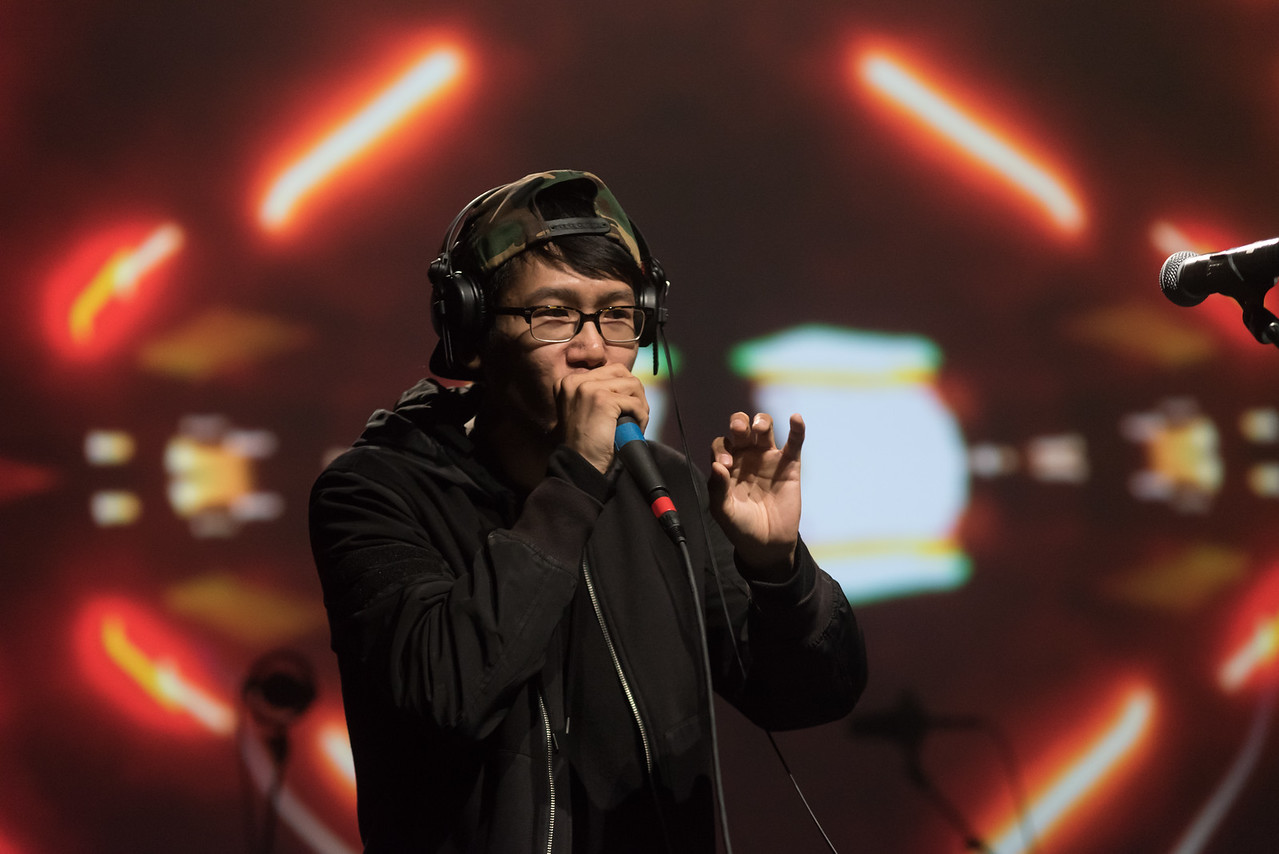
- SungBeats in 2018
- Born: Sung Lee; October 25, 1989 (age 37)
- Occupation: Beatbox loop artist
- Years active: 2011–present
- Known for: Apollo Night 2014, Kollaboration 2014, American Beatbox Championships 2018
- Style: pop, hip-hop, trap, dance
- Website: www.sungbeats.com

Sung Lee, professionally known as SungBeats, is a beatboxer, live looper, and content creator based in New York City. He is best known for winning Amateur Night at the Apollo (Season 80), and the American Beatbox Championships, Loopstation (2018). Sung’s original viral YouTube series “Making Beats for Strangers” has garnered international attention around the world.

== Background ==
SungBeats was born in South Korea but immigrated to the United States when he was 9 years old. He first discovered the art of beatboxing by watching a video of Tampa's beatbox EFFEX when he was 13. Despite being discouraged by his peers, he continued to pursue beatboxing and won the annual talent show at Leonia High School as a freshman. Sung studied Psychology at Rutgers University and performed at various open mics and social events on campus. Prior to embarking on his music career, he worked as an office manager in Las Vegas.

== Professional career ==
SungBeats quit his job to perform in the subways of New York City when he was 23. A year later, he won Amateur Night at the Apollo (2014) and Kollaboration, the premiere Asian American talent contest in the United States. Since, SungBeats has been a vocal advocate for Asian-American representation in mainstream media. In 2015, he shifted his musical focus from solo beatboxing to live vocal looping, recognizing that live instrumentation was the future of the art form. The same year, he became the first American to represent at the Grand Beatbox Battle, Loopstation category, placing 8th. In 2016, Sung partnered with Defy Ventures and toured maximum security prisons, including Solano State Prison and Riker's Island. In 2017, Sung's work as a busker in the New York City underground was featured in various news outlets. In 2021, SungBeats appeared on several national commercials including Mars Wrigley's M&Ms Mix commercial. He currently tours and performs his combination beatbox and looping show all over the United States.

== Musical style ==
SungBeats is best known for his live-looping and ability to layer precise vocals to replicate covers. Stylistically, he has embraced music of all genres ranging from hip hop, EDM, and house. Sung has credited some of his early beatbox influences to be Rahzel, Kenny Muhammad, and FaithSFX. In terms of equipment, he uses the Roland RC-505 MKI to layer and sample his vocals in real time, and is a frequent user of the IOS app Loopy HD for vocal production.

== Competitions ==
Tournaments and Competitions
Year	Competition	Final Result
2011	American Beatbox Championships, Solo	2
2014	Kollaboration NY	1
2014	Kollaboration Star (Finals)	1
2014	Amateur Night at the Apollo (Season 80)	1
2015	American Beatbox Championships, Loopstation	4
2015	Grand Beatbox Battle, Loopstation	8
2018	American Beatbox Championships, Loopstation	1
2021	Grand Beatbox Battle, Loopstation	Elimination
