= Rahzel's Greatest Knock Outs =

Greatest hits album by Rahzel
- Released: June 1, 2004
- Genre: Hip hop; beatboxing
- Length: 68:13
- Label: Sure Shot Recordings
- Producer: A. Turner (exec.); Chris Landry (exec.); Russell Jones (exec.); DJ JS-1 (also exec.)

Rahzel chronology
Make the Music 2000 (1999)	Rahzel's Greatest Knock Outs (2004)

Professional ratings
Review scores
Source	Rating
AllMusic	3.5/5 stars
RapReviews	7.5/10 stars

Rahzel's Greatest Knock Outs is the second album by American beatboxer and hip hop artist Rahzel. It was released on June 1, 2004, via Sure Shot Recordings.

== Track listing ==
No.	Title	Length
1.	"Knockout!!!!" (intro)	1:30
2.	"Essentials" (remix) (featuring KRS-One)	1:21
3.	"Live from London"	1:29
4.	"Rahstrumental Breaks 1" (Mechanical Man 1)	0:44
5.	"Nuthin 2 F@%k With (Live!)" (featuring RZA)	1:58
6.	"The 4 Elements" (featuring Kenny Muhammad The Human Orchestra)	1:00
7.	"Freestyle (Tim Westwood Show)" (featuring Black Thought and DJ Hurricane)	1:54
8.	"Rahstrumental Break 2"	1:51
9.	"Children's Story" (featuring Everlast)	3:21
10.	"Rahstrumental Break 3 (Deep Cover)" (featuring Tonedeff)	1:31
11.	"Interlude" (featuring Funkmaster Flex)	5:48
12.	"Used to Be Perfect" (remix) (featuring Lynden David Hall)	3:20
13.	"'88" (featuring React)	2:51
14.	"Tribute to Jam Master Jay" (featuring Supernatural)	5:15
15.	"The Lesson, Pt. 1" (featuring ?uestlove, Dice Raw and Black Thought)	5:06
16.	"On Ya Block" (featuring Trez)	1:42
17.	"Live from Philadelphia" (featuring E.S.T.)	2:21
18.	"Get Fresh (Do the Beat Box)" (featuring Milini)	3:19
19.	"Night Riders" (remix) (featuring Slick Rick)	3:07
20.	"The Undisputed" (interlude)	1:48
21.	"Rahzel vs. Rob Swift"	2:54
22.	"Freestyle" (Tim Westwood Show) (featuring Gravediggaz)	2:46
23.	"U.N.I.T.Y." (featuring Cee-Lo)	1:27
24.	"Tribute to Aaliyah (One in a Million)" (live in London)	1:14
25.	"Guess (U Neva Knew)"	3:46
26.	"How Many Times (Remarkable!)" (featuring Keith Murray and Lord Tariq)	4:50
Total length:		1:08:13

== Personnel ==
- Rahzel Manely Brown – main artist
- William Tramontozzi – executive producer, scratches (tracks: 2, 8, 13, 14), DJ mix
- A. Turner – executive producer
- Chris Landry – executive producer
- Russell Jones – executive producer
- Ahmir Khalib Thompson – featured artist (track 15)
- Erik Francis Schrody – featured artist (track 9)
- Karl Jenkins – featured artist (track 15)
- Keith Murray – featured artist (track 26)
- Kenny Muhammad The Human Orchestra – featured artist (track 6)
- Lawrence Parker – featured artist (track 2)
- Lynden David Hall – featured artist (track 12)
- Pedro Antonio Rojas, Jr. – featured artist (track 10)
- Reco Price – featured artist (track 14)
- Richard Martin Lloyd Walters – featured artist (track 19)
- Robert Aguilar – scratches (track 21)
- Robert Fitzgerald Diggs – featured artist (tracks: 5, 22)
- Robert Waller – featured artist (track 17)
- Sean "Lord Tariq" Hamilton – featured artist (track 26)
- Tariq "Black Thought" Trotter – featured artist (tracks: 7, 15)
- Thomas DeCarlo Callaway – featured artist (track 23)
- Wendell Timothy Fite – featured artist (track 7)
- Benjamin Altman – artwork and design
- Kaysh Shinn – photography

== Rahzel's Greatest Knock Outs: Volume 2 ==
Another volume of Rahzel's Greatest Knock Outs was planned to be released in the summer of 2008. It was supposed to be his first solo album released after splitting with the Roots, but the project was never released. It was to feature two singles called "Ring the Alarm" and "Come Fly with Me" (featuring Mike Patton).
