= Marc Rebillet =

American electronic musician and YouTuber (born 1988)

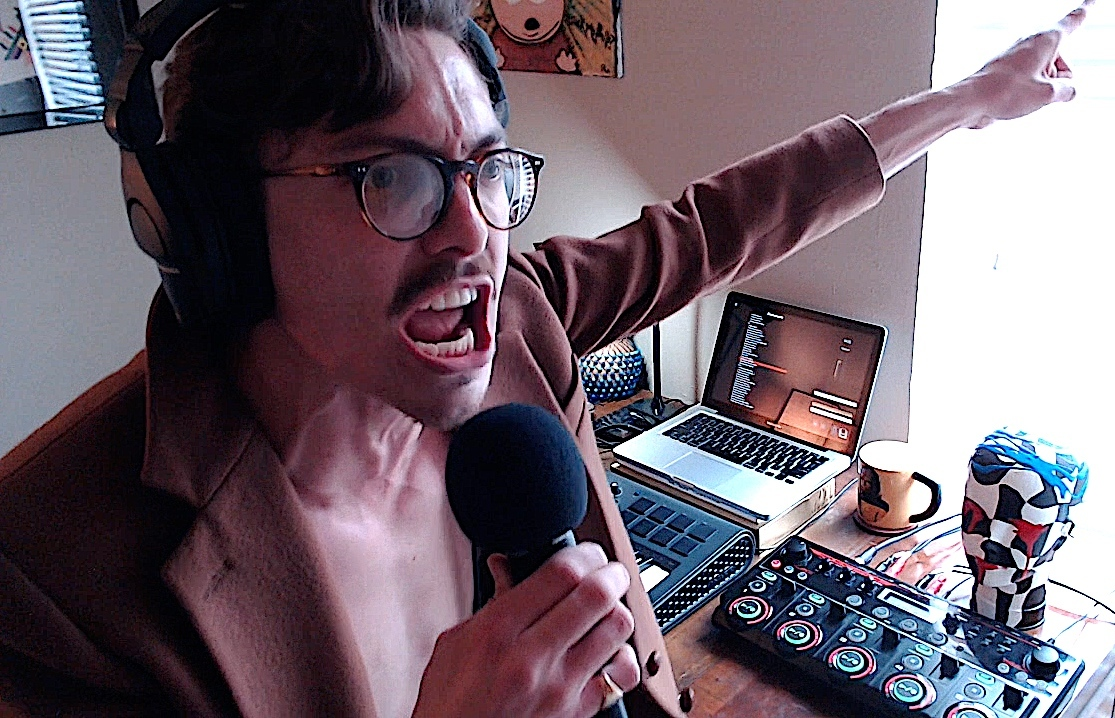
- Rebillet performing in a YouTube video in his Dallas apartment, July 2019

Background information
- Also known as: Loop Daddy, leae
- Born: December 15, 1988 (age 37); Dallas, Texas U.S.
- Genres: Electronic; house; disco; experimental; rhythm and blues; funk; blue-eyed soul; comedy
- Occupations: Musician; YouTuber
- Instruments: Vocals; loop station; piano
- Years active: 2016–present
- Website: marcrebillet.com

YouTube information
- Channel: Marc Rebillet
- Years active: 2016–present
- Genre: Music
- Subscribers: 2.44 million
- Views: 245.6 million
- Last updated: May 14, 2026

Marc Rebillet (French pronunciation: [ʁəbijɛ]; born December 15, 1988) is an American electronic musician and YouTuber from Dallas based in New York City. He is known for his improvised funk, hip-hop, and electronic music with free-flowing, humorous lyrics. He distributes his work primarily through YouTube videos and Twitch live streams using a loop station, keyboard, vocals, and percussion instruments to produce his songs in his apartment. He has released three studio albums under his legal name: Marc Rebillet, Europe, and Loop Daddy III; two extended play records (Loop Daddy and Loop Daddy II), and three projects under his "leae" moniker: Pod 314, the Rattlebrain EP, and the week | ep.

== Early life ==
Rebillet's father was French and his mother is from South Carolina. His parents met in Paris. Rebillet started playing piano at age four; he studied classical music until age 15 while attending Booker T. Washington High School for the Performing and Visual Arts in Dallas.

In 2007, Rebillet first went viral after being interviewed on Fox 4 in Dallas, while lining up to be the first to buy an iPhone during its initial release. A woman paid Rebillet $800 for his spot in the front of the line, attempting to buy many phones to resell. The plan backfired because the store's policy only allowed one iPhone sale per customer. The video of the interview received 5 million views.

Rebillet dropped out of Southern Methodist University in Dallas after studying acting for a year. During the next decade, Rebillet worked as a server, an executive assistant, and in a corporate call center while producing music under the name "leae." Rebillet moved to New York City in 2011 and back to Dallas in 2014 to care for his father Gilbert who was diagnosed with Alzheimer's disease. His father died in 2018.

In 2016, Marc Rebillet claimed on Reddit to have discovered an alleged unreleased 1998 Sufjan Stevens album in a dumpster outside record label Asthmatic Kitty's studios in Dumbo in Brooklyn, New York in 2014. A representative from the label who responded to the post was unable to confirm the album's authenticity, but requested that Rebillet not share it. A few hours later, he proceeded to upload the album and share it on 4chan. In an interview with Stereogum the next day, he expressed regret for disrespecting the label's wishes, but said that he wanted to let the album be preserved online. When asked if the album was possibly a hoax, Rebillet responded, "I have neither the time nor the desire to prove its authenticity."

== Career ==
=== Online streaming ===
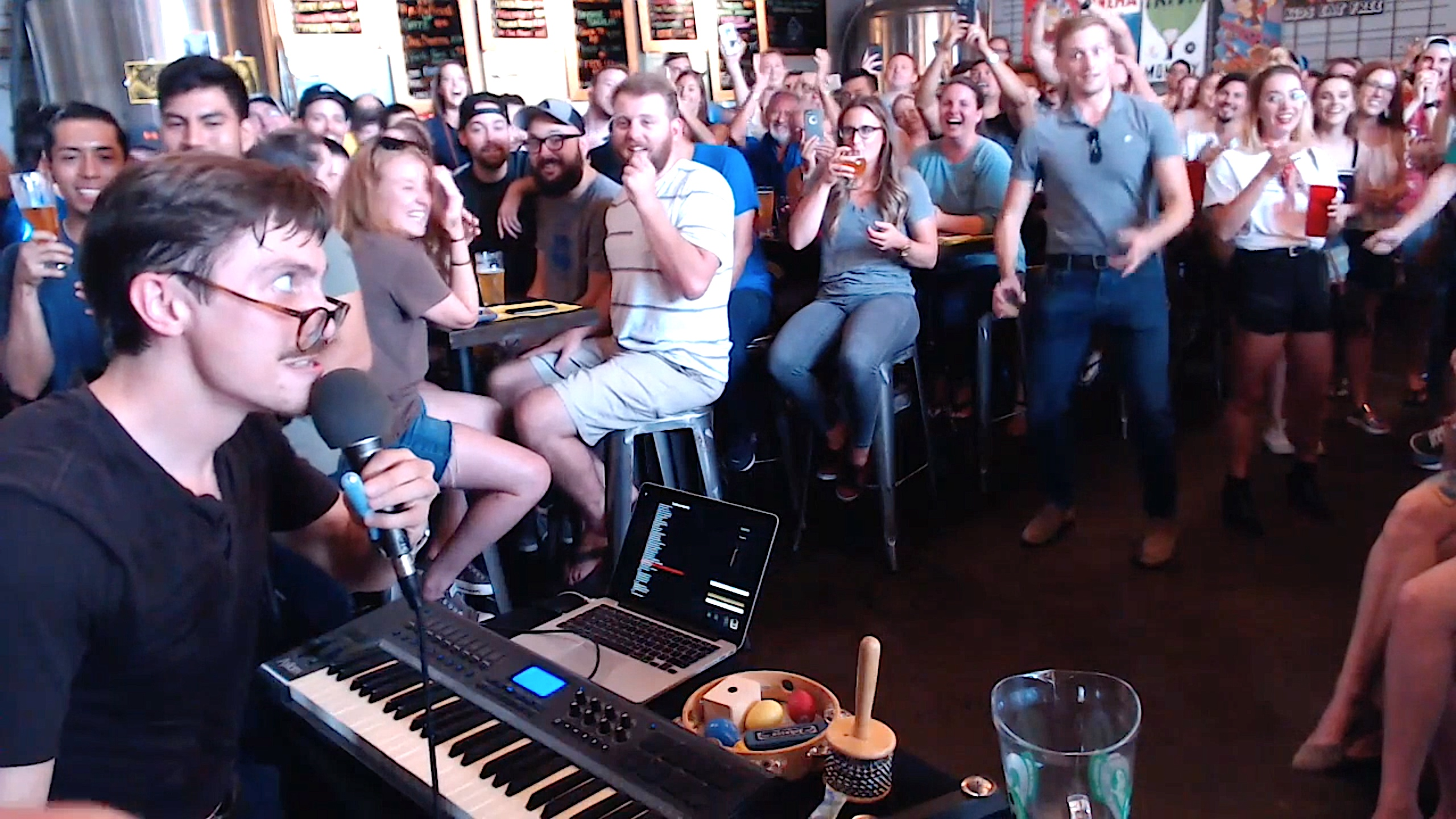
Rebillet performing at BrainDead Brewing in Deep Ellum, Dallas, July 29 2018; BrainDead closed in November 2021

Rebillet's professional music career began in 2016, when he began publishing YouTube videos (dubbed "Idealogues" by Rebillet) and live streams of himself improvising songs in his bedroom, apartment, and hotel rooms, often while dancing in his boxer briefs. The videos began to go viral on Reddit and Facebook, generating a fan base, and earning Rebillet tips. Many of his songs are inspired by live requests from his fans, who call him on a phone number which he posts on social media, or comment during the live stream. Rebillet's sessions last from one to five hours. The content of the streams varies widely, from romance and sex to more frivolous topics, such as snacking.

Rebillet's first paid performance was at the Festicle beer fest at the now closed BrainDead Brewing in Deep Ellum, Dallas where he had previously waited tables. The brewpub owners offered him a weekly Sunday brunch residency, which he maintained for eight months in addition to his regular appearances at other Dallas bars including The Common Table and Twilite Lounge. After determining that Dallas was not giving him the reception he wanted he moved back to New York City, and after two months of performing at dive bars he secured a booking agent and two sold out tours.

During the COVID-19 pandemic, Rebillet's tour of Australia and New Zealand was canceled and subsequently rescheduled for early 2021. In place of the canceled shows, he scheduled four free live stream shows on Twitch named for four cities on the canceled tour. He called the collection of shows the "Quarantine Livestream Tour," with the first show attracting over 1.57 million viewers and raising over $34,000 for coronavirus-related charity. Explaining why he chose the streaming platform, Rebillet told The Verge, "I'm just trying to survive, and Twitch has the highest earning potential for livestreams."

Also related to the pandemic, Rebillet recorded a song, called "Essential Workers Anthem," dedicated to essential workers, to thank them for their work. Discussing the song for the Boston Herald, Jed Gottlieb wrote that "the tune he built in a minute had more moxie and magic than anything on the recent lo-fi network TV concerts".

On December 9, 2020, in anticipation of hitting one million YouTube subscribers, Rebillet streamed live during and after hitting the milestone. He used the stream as an opportunity to donate to multiple charities. He has performed streams with Erykah Badu, Reggie Watts, Emily King, DJ Premier, Brady Watt, Flying Lotus, Madison McFerrin, Harry Mack, and Wayne Brady.

In June 2021, Rebillet starred in a television commercial for German supermarket chain Edeka. The commercial shows him creating music in the market by playing the produce and food products as musical instruments. As of August 2021, Rebillet has 11.8 million online streams of his music, more than 2 million YouTube subscribers, and over 127 million YouTube views.

Rebillet was the host of a biweekly series "We've Got Company" that streamed on Twitch in early 2022, featuring Rebillet along with musical guests. Guests during the first season included Erykah Badu, Wyclef Jean, Tokimonsta, Alison Wonderland, Reggie Watts and Tenacious D.

=== Live performances ===
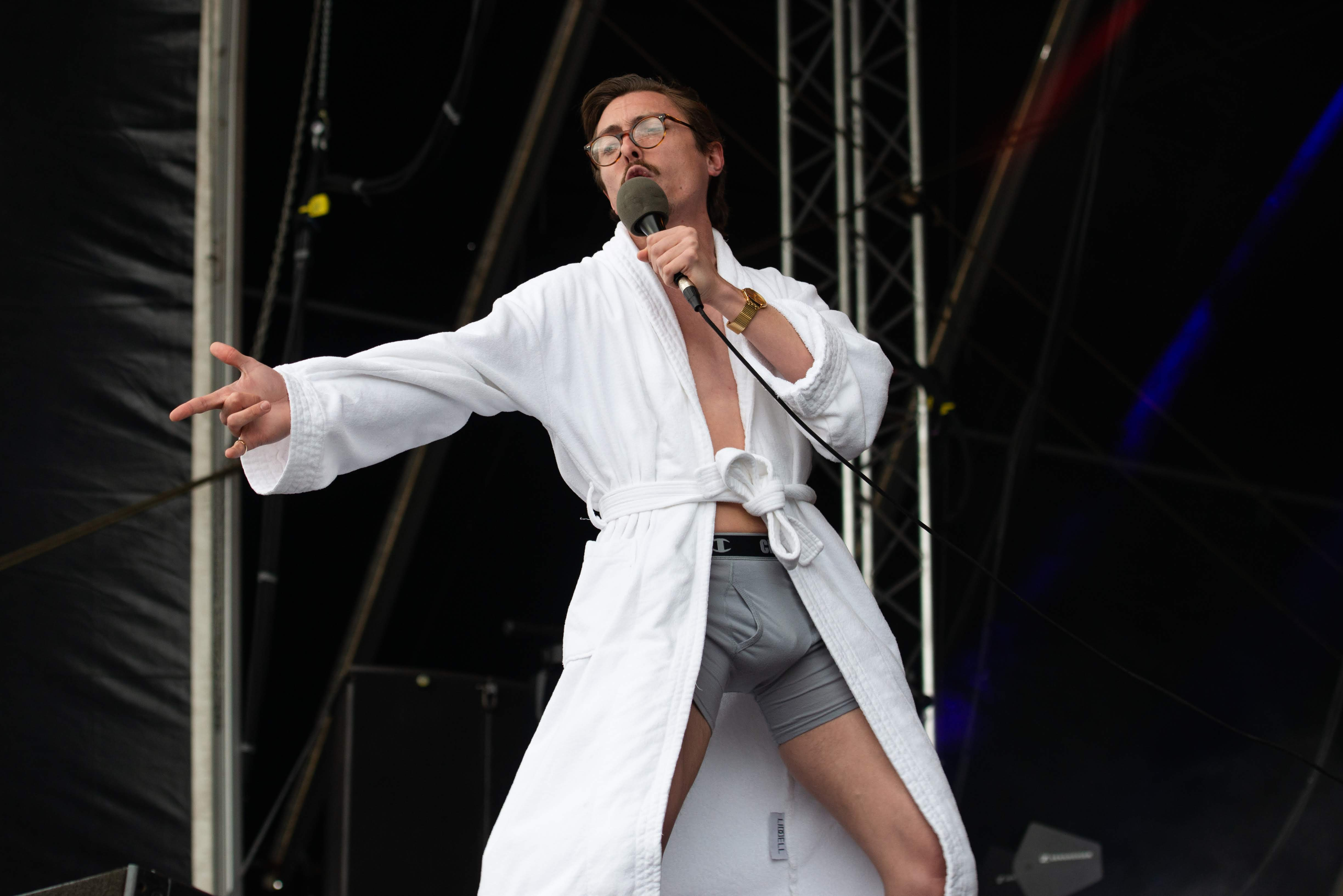
Rebillet performing at the Beatyard, a festival in Dún Laoghaire, Ireland, August 2019

His first live shows took place in 2017 in bars in Dallas. He then moved to New York City to further develop his music career. Talking about how his online presence quickly increased his fanbase, Rebillet told an interviewer from Central Track:

It happened very, very quickly... the whole online thing just took off in this very aggressive way... people around the world just started sharing my stuff on Facebook primarily, and my audience on Facebook went from 7,000 or 10,000 followers to, within a week or two, 50,000. Then it was 100,000... it just kept climbing!... with that spike came all of these booking requests from all over the world that I really had no clue how to deal with or what to do with.

Starting in 2019, Rebillet has performed on tours in the United States and Europe, and ticket sales have become his primary source of revenue. Rebillet's live shows are energetic, interactive, and almost entirely improvised, with very little material being repeated from show to show. Explaining his approach to performance, Rebillet said, "I think up a couple of ideas, make some observations through the day, think of something that's germane to the crowd I'm playing to, I use those things as seedlings for song ideas." The Dublin Gazette called Rebillet "a man who's thoughtful far beyond his output. A considered artist, having fun." The Irish Examiner said Rebillet is a "DJ/comedian/one-person emotional meltdown" and called his live performance "unnerving and very engaging". Tyler Hicks of the Dallas Observer said that "few performers can match the zealous intensity".

In 2021, Rebillet embarked on the "Third Dose" tour, which included the major American music festivals Bonnaroo, Austin City Limits Music Festival, and Lollapalooza.

In April 2023, Rebillet performed at the Coachella Festival in Indio, California. In the summer of the same year, he began "We Outside," a series of live streamed performances in unannounced public places across New York City, like Union Square in Manhattan and McCarren Park in Brooklyn.

On February 11, 2024, Rebillet made his TV debut during a special football-themed episode of CBS panel show After Midnight, which aired on Super Bowl Sunday after the network's coverage of Super Bowl LVIII. In April 2024, Rebillet performed again at the Coachella Music and Arts Festival, this time at the Do Lab stage. On May 14, Rebillet performed at Google I/O 2024 while making use of MusicFX, a Google generative AI music creation product. On July 6, 2024, Rebillet was at the Rock Werchter Festival in Werchter, Belgium. He performed at the KluB C stage at the festival.

=== Drive-In Concert Tour ===
In response to the COVID-19 pandemic in 2020, in which all concerts were canceled, Rebillet scheduled a "drive-in concert tour" in June 2020, in which he performed at twelve shows at eight drive-in theaters in the U.S while attendees watched from their cars and listened over a local radio frequency. The objective of the performances was to remain in compliance with social distancing regulations. In place of opening acts, short films were shown. Explaining how he planned to perform, Rebillet told CNN "Since everyone is going to be forced to be in their cars, I'll be able to do a lot of running around, 'interacting' with the audience, just by doing my thing." The tour was called the first of its kind in the United States and was generally sold-out, grossing $523,000 with 12,132 attendees. He reached more fans on the drive-in tour than he would have on a comparable tour of indoor venues.

== Awards and recognition ==
In August 2019, Billboard named Rebillet as a "Billboard Dance Emerging Artist", writing that he creates "sexy hooks", "sensual R&B burners", and "hip-hop-tinged funk creations". In December 2019, Shacknews awarded him the "Do it for Shacknews Award 2019," saying that he rose to a "surprising level of Internet notoriety" in 2019. Shacknews CEO Asif Khan wrote, "The popularity of his very experimental style to creating music is inspiring to the countless part-time studio musicians who are out there on the Internet. Marc's ability to build a community has lead [sic] to pockets of cheerleaders appearing all over the place these days."

In 2020, Clubbing TV named Rebillet No. 2 to its list of the top 40 live streaming DJs, saying, "No one can make you laugh and dance like Marc Rebillet."

== Music ==
Rebillet's music is defined by his use of a Boss RC-505 loop station, which allows him to layer his voice with keyboards, tambourines, and other hand percussion instruments. Most of his songs are improvised, and include elements of funk, soul, hip hop, and house music, as well as comedy skits. Nick Pagano described Rebillet's music as ranging "from soulful serenading piano ballads to funky bass licks to downright club bangers, and is always accompanied by his unique sense of humor". His lyrics tend to be comical, silly, or vulgar, enough so that he has been referred to as a comedian. Rebillet's "goofy", "nerdy", yet "earnest" personality plays a role in his popularity. Speaking about the lyrical content of Rebillet's songs, WBUR's Tonya Mosley said, "they’re actually really insightful. It’s sort of like social commentary."

Rebillet has mentioned Reggie Watts, Nina Simone, Madlib, and James Blake as sources of inspiration for his work. Speaking of Reggie Watts, Rebillet has said, "I would not be doing this if he didn’t exist."

== Political views ==
During the 2022 edition of the Touquet Music Beach Festival, Rebillet made statements about President Emmanuel Macron of France on stage, who was present at the festival, shouting “Macron! Enculé!” ( [Expletive] Macron!) and “Dégage Macron!” (Get lost Macron!). Macron was echoed by some of the audience. In anger, the president of the festival threw a glass at a member of Rebillet's team. The mayor of Le Touquet-Paris-Plage, Daniel Fasquelle, subsequently asked via X that the festival's management not include Rebillet in future editions. Rebillet responded on X that he had no intention of accepting another invitation. He repeated the insult a few days later at his concert at Olympia Hall in Paris.

Rebillet supported Kamala Harris in the 2024 United States presidential election, writing on Instagram: "If you don’t vote for Kamala I’m going to dismember you and feed you into a wood shredder."

== Personal life ==
In 2021, Architectural Digest published a feature on Rebillet's apartment in Lower Manhattan, New York. Carly Olson praised Rebillet's style and "killer eye for design", writing that his "light and airy two-bedroom apartment in Lower Manhattan is clean and pristine, featuring statement art, vintage finds, and even a couple trophy pieces that’ll give true furniture nerds hearts in their eyes." The apartment contains furniture by Ligne Roset and Pierre Paulin, and art by Verner Panton and Jack Youngerman.

On September 10, 2021, Rebillet threw out the ceremonial first pitch in a Major League Baseball game in St. Louis, Missouri, between the St. Louis Cardinals and the Cincinnati Reds.

== Discography ==
=== Solo albums ===
- Marc Rebillet (2018)
- Europe (2019)
- Loop Daddy III (2020)

=== Extended plays ===
- Loop Daddy (2018)
- Loop Daddy II (2019)

=== Singles ===
Title	Year	Peak chart positions		Album
Title	Year	US Dig.	UK Sales	Album
"Funk Emergency"	2019	—	—	Loop Daddy II
"One More Time"	2019	—	—	Loop Daddy II
"You Were There"	2019	—	—	Non-album singles
"Work That Ass For Daddy"	2019	—	—	Non-album singles
"Vaccinated Attitude"	2021	—	—	Non-album singles
"The Way You Make Me Feel" (with the Kount featuring Moods)	2021	—	—	Non-album singles
"Everybody Say Goodbye" (with Norah Jones)	2022	—	—	Non-album singles
"Your New Morning Alarm"	2023	8	10	Non-album singles
"I Want to Die"	2023	—	—	Non-album singles
"Late to Work"	2023	—	—	Non-album singles
"Night Time Bitch"	2023	—	—	Non-album singles
"Vibes Alright"	2024	—	—	Non-album singles

=== As leae ===
- Pod 314 (with USooME) (2012)
- Rattlebrain EP (2013)
- week | ep (2013)

== Filmography ==
Year	Name	Role	Notes
2019	Sway in the Morning	Guest	Marc Rebillet Creates Music Live with Special Guest Rico Love | Sway's Universe
2020	Your Mom's House	Self	Your Mom's House Podcast – Ep. 576
2020	The Cave	Self – Guest	The Cave: Season 2 – Episode 11
2020	H3 Podcast	Self	H3 Podcast No. 191
2021	The Carlos Watson Show	Self	Season 2 Episode 50
2021	The Kids Tonight Show	Self	Season 1 Episode 16
2022	We've Got Company!	Self – Host	https://www.imdb.com/title/tt19733062/?ref_=nm_flmg_slf_2
2022	Disgraceland	Self	Disgraceland Talks with Marc Rebillet
2023	80 for Brady	DJ	
2024	After Midnight	Guest	Super Bowl special halftime show
2024	Ricky Stanicky	Himself	Filmed during his Melbourne show in 2023
2026	Your Friends And Neighbors	DJ	Pool Party scene Season 2 Episode 1
