= Kaoss Pad =

Sampler and audio effects unit

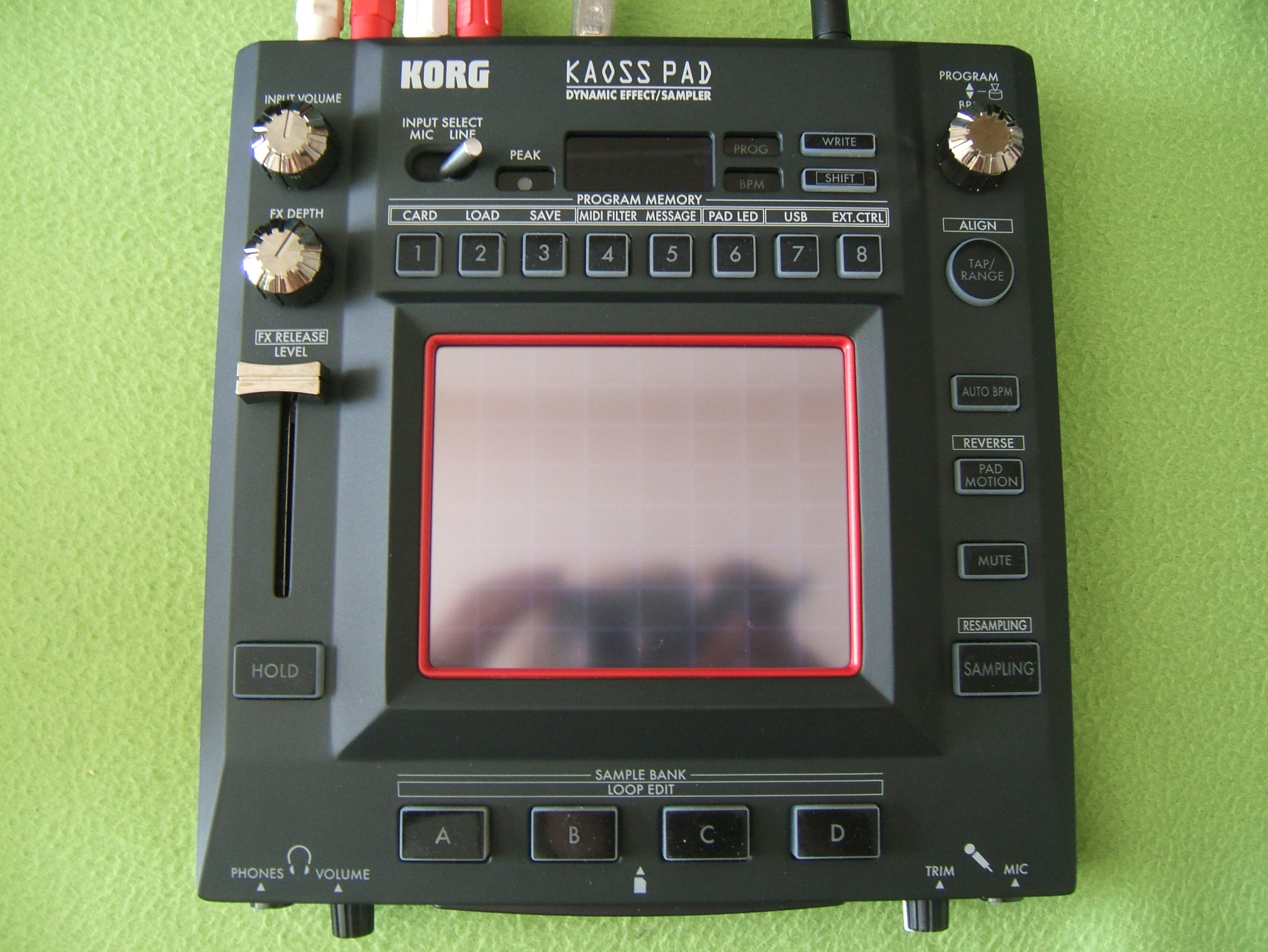
- Korg Kaoss Pad KP3
- Manufacturer: Korg
- Dates: Introduced in 1999. Current Hardware iteration/redesign (“KP3”) released in 2006, VST Software version released in November 2022.
- Price: ~$400

Technical specifications
- Oscillator: User Samples; PCM for preset synth voices
- LFO: Multiple LFO options, waveforms and combinations of LFO with other effects
- Synthesis type: Several preset synth and drum voices; granular synthesis
- Filter: Multiple
- Aftertouch expression: no
- Velocity expression: no
- Storage memory: 4 Memory Slots and read/write to SD card (2GB Max)
- Effects: 150

Input/output
- Keyboard: none - XY-pad
- Left-hand control: FX Release; FX parameter ‘Hold’
- External control: Supports multiple configurations as a MIDI Controller for external hardware. MIDI configurations (e.g. X-Y pad configuration) can be stored as Program Files on SD media.
- Audio sample: 4 sample slots with unlimited overdub/resampling

The Kaoss Pad is a sampler and audio effects processor launched by Korg in 1999. It allows users to record and process audio and apply various effects using an X-Y touchscreen. It has been used by artists including Radiohead, Muse and Brian Eno.

== Features ==
The Kaoss Pad allows users to sample and loop audio and apply effects such as pitch-bending, flange, distortion, and delay using a touchscreen. According to the Guardian, while its effects technology was not new, the Kaoss Pad was distinguished by its intuitive design: "Anyone can pick one up and in a matter of seconds get the hang of it."

The British producer and musician Brian Eno, an early adopter of the Kaoss Pad, described it as "a way of taking sounds into the domain of muscular control" as opposed to working with computers: "It takes you into a completely different place, because when working with computers you normally don't use your muscles in that way."

== Models ==
Korg released the original Kaoss Pad in 1990. The Kaoss Pad 2, released in 2002, added expanded MIDI functionality and improved sound quality. The Kaoss Pad 3, released in 2007, added improved looping and sampling functionality and a SD card slot to save samples. It was followed by the Kaoss Pad Quad in 2011 and the Kaoss Pad V in 2026. Korg also released a range of Mini Kaoss Pad units.

== Users ==
Radiohead use a Kaoss Pad on performances of their 2000 song "Everything In Its Right Place" to manipulate Thom Yorke's vocals into a "glitching, stuttering collage". Matt Bellamy of Muse, described by the Guardian as "undoubtedly the Kaoss rock star", uses touchscreen MIDI controllers built into his guitars to control Kaoss Pads. Other users include Eno, the singer Bryan Ferry and the beatboxer Beardyman.

== See also ==
- Korg Kaossilator, a Korg synthesizer with a Kaoss Pad interface
