= Live looping =

Musical technique

Looping device
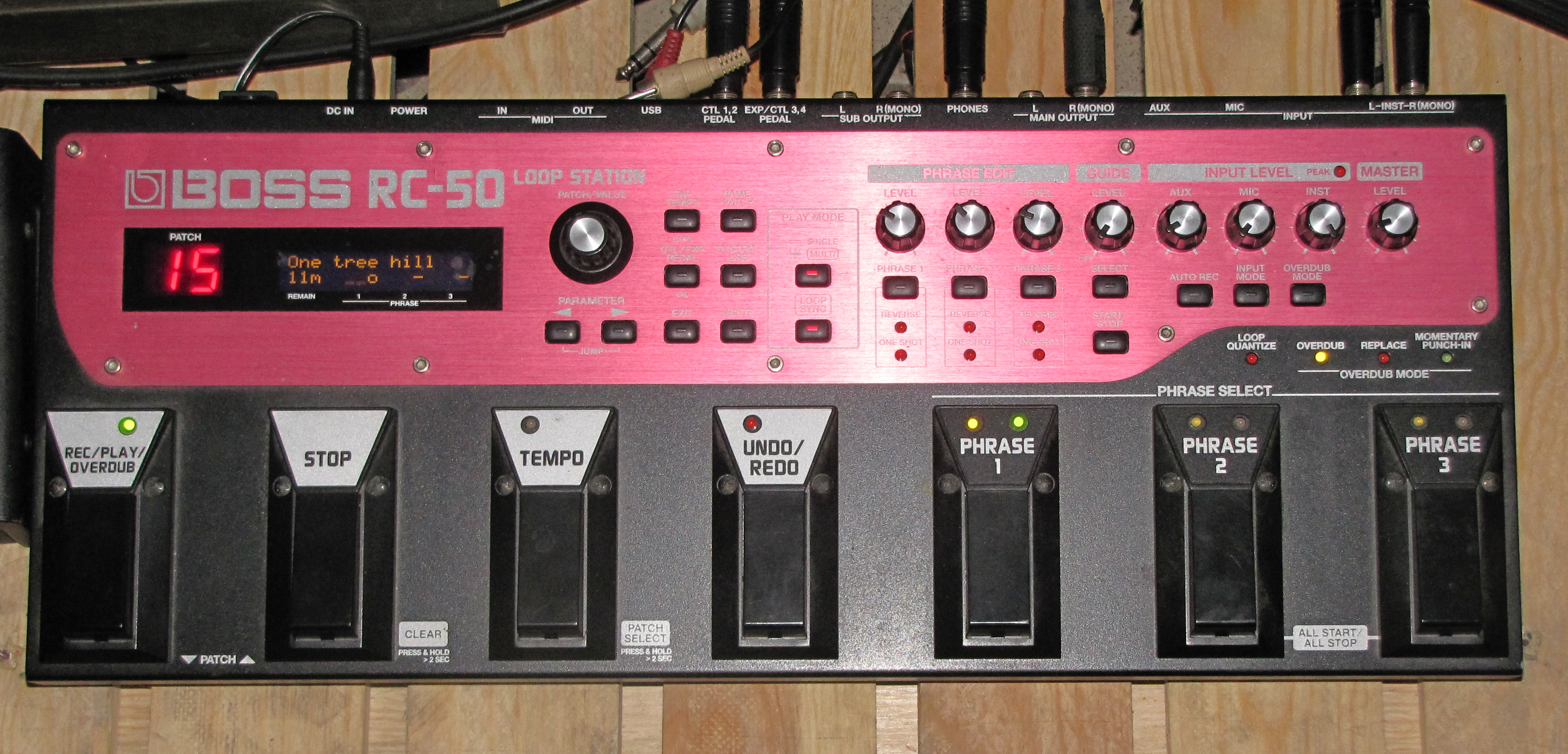
- A floor-based Boss RC loop pedal.

Electronic instrument
- Developed: Late 20th century

Related instruments
- Synthesizer, Moog modular synthesizer

Musicians
- Erik Satie, Māmā Mihirangi, Brian Eno, Terry Riley, Beardyman, Marc Rebillet, Sidney Gish

Live looping is the recording and playback of a piece of music in real-time using either dedicated hardware devices, called loopers or phrase samplers, or software running on a computer with an audio interface. Musicians can loop with either looping software or loop pedals, which are sold for tabletop and floor-based use.

== History of the looping device ==
By the late 19th century, jazz and blues had heavily influenced popular music, encouraging musicians to experiment with rhythm, repetition, and musical improvisation. With the advent of sound recording on gramophone record, invented in 1887 and first marketed in 1889, came the tape recorder and the development of pure electronic music.

On 1 October 1947, Bing Crosby became the first American musician to release music via tape broadcast. In 1953, Les Paul demonstrated live looping on the television show Omnibus.

In 1963, musician and performer Terry Riley released an early tape loop piece called “The Gift”, featuring the trumpet playing of Chet Baker. It was the first piece ever based on a tape delay/feedback system with two Revox tape recorders. (Riley used to call this system the Time Lag Accumulator. This name did not catch on amongst other performing musicians.)

Digital delay systems in the 1980s were experimental and not intuitive, but the equipment's limitations inspired innovators of the technique to find creative applications.

Even by the early 1990s, when dedicated loop machines first went on sale, the term "live looping" had not yet been coined. The first dedicated loop device was the Paradis LOOP Delay. The Paradis and other models had volatile memories, forcing composers to develop fresh loops live in front of their audiences — and thus, live looping came into existence.

Roland and DigiTech loop pedals entered the market in 2001, around the same time DJ mixing gained popularity. When the 2002 Repeater introduced real-time studio looping, looping devices became affordable enough for aspiring at-home composers to enjoy.

As laptops gained popularity in 2004, computer software began to emulate the 1990s effects of early looping devices.

│
1887
│
1913
│
1939
│
1965
│
1991
Innovations and inventions leading to live loop technology

== Modern live looping tools and applications ==
Live looping has become increasingly popular in recent history as it offers the ability for a single musician to create multiple layers to their live music, resulting in a sound close to that of a "full band" experience. Notable manufacturers of looping devices include Boss, DigiTech and TC Electronic.

== Notable artists ==
In a 2012–13 poll of 1000 singers, 11% stated that they used live looping while 51% did not know what live looping was. Artists known for their use or advocacy of the technique include:

- Angine de Poitrine
- Juana Molina
- KRNFX
- Howie Day
- Keller Williams
- Boxwood
- Māmā Mihirangi
- Ed Sheeran
- Mavka
- Dub FX
- Battles
- Ambre McLean
- Jacob Moon
- Amy X Neuburg
- Beardyman
- Kimbra
- Noize MC
- KT Tunstall
- Kid Beyond
- Tune-Yards
- David Torn
- Spirit Cool
- David Thomas Broughton
- Reggie Watts
- THePETEBOX
- French Kiwi Juice
- Rick Walker
- David Ford
- Netta Barzilai
- Val Vigoda
- Jarle Bernhoft
- Marc Rebillet
- Tash Sultana
- Theresa Andersson
- Sam Perry
- Bernhard Wagner
- Andre La Fosse
- Michael Peters
- Leander Reininghaus
- Hideki Nakanishi (aka MANDOMAN)
- Joel Gilardini
- Emmanuel Reveneau (aka Brain Integrative Project)
- SungBeats
- Fabio Anile
- Andrew Bird
- Masnada Lilian
- Døvydas

== See also ==
- Loop (music)
- Live electronic music
- Delay (audio effect)
