= Poizunus =

Canadian beatboxer

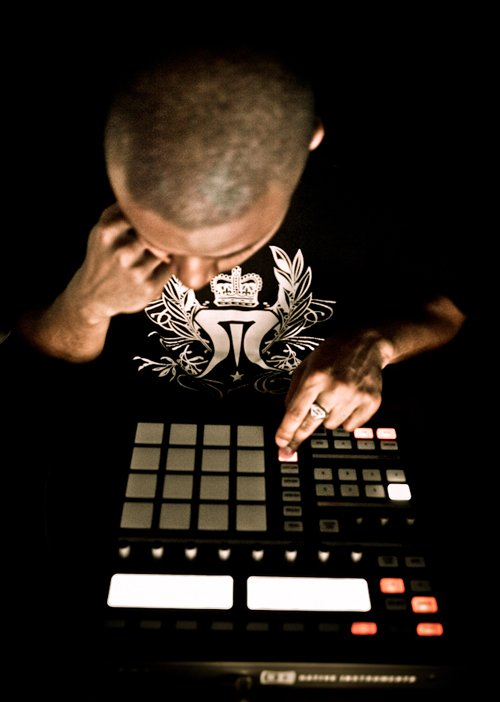
- Poizunus in the Studio

Background information
- Origin: Toronto
- Genres: Beatbox, Hip-Hop
- Occupations: Disc jockey, Record producer, Mixing engineer
- Years active: 2001–present
- Labels: silentBoom Productions, NorthStarr Entertainment, EliteGame Entertainment
- Website: beatsxpoizun.com poizunus.com

Poizunus is a Canadian beatboxer.

== History ==
Since touring England in 2005 and performing at the Miami Winter Music Conference with artists DJ Craze and Killa Kela in 2006, Poizunus has had some success both locally and internationally. He ranked in the top 10 at the World Beatboxing Championship in Germany and placed first at Scribble Jam's 2007 Beatbox Battle.

In 2006, Poizunus was featured in Canada's MuchMusic program “Music is My Life”. The show took a backstage look at Poizunus' life and the 604 Hip Hop Expo Beatbox Battle, where he placed first. Since then, he has been featured in two MuchVibe commercials, and appeared on several television spots, including MTV Live Canada, CityTV's Breakfast Television, MuchMusic's RapCity and Going Coastal. He has also opened for artists such as Method Man, Busta Rhymes, DJ Jazzy Jeff and Obie Trice.

Growing up, Poizunus was heavily influenced by his parents’ collection of soulful music as well as his cousin's hip-hop compilations. That influence created a desire to be surrounded by music which led Poizunus into the world of vocal percussion. With over 10 years of experience in the music industry and 20 years of beatboxing, Poizunus now makes original music and works as a producer in the film, television and commercial markets.

Over the past few years, Poizunus' music has been featured on Modernbeats.com, the Coast2Coast Instrumental Mixtape series and collaborated with Cory Gunz from Young Money. While already receiving music placements with MTV2 USA and MuchMusic Canada, Poizunus is also working on projects with some upcoming Canadian, US and international artists.

== Discography ==
=== Studio albums ===
- A.ctive D.reaming D.isorder (2007)
- Training Camp/Don't Sleep Sundays (2013)

=== Mixtape Appearances ===
- Kardinal Offishall - Offishall Badman Bizness (Mixed by DJ Chong Wizard) (2006)
- X-Clan - Robots of Dawn (Mixed by DJ Chong Wizard) (2007)
