= Make the Music 2000 =

Studio album by Rahzel
- Released: August 10, 1999
- Recorded: 1998–1999
- Studio: Green Street (New York City); Maritime Hall (San Francisco); Marley Marl's House of Hits (New York City); Sony Music (New York City); The Cutting
- Genre: Hip hop; beatboxing
- Length: 52:34
- Label: MCA
- Producer: Rahzel (also exec.); Bob Power; L.E.S.; Marley Marl; Pete Rock; Scott Storch; Twilite Tone

Rahzel chronology
Make the Music 2000 (1999)	Rahzel's Greatest Knock Outs (2004)

Singles from Make the Music 2000
- 1. "All I Know" Released: May 25, 1999; 2. "Southern Gul" Released: July 26, 1999

Make the Music 2000 is the debut studio album by American beatboxer and hip hop artist Rahzel. It was released on August 10, 1999 via MCA Records. Production was handled by several record producers, including Bob Power, Marley Marl, Pete Rock, Scott Storch, L.E.S. and Rahzel himself. The album also features guest appearances from Aaron Hall, Emanon, Erykah Badu, Q-Tip, Scratch, Slick Rick, the Roots, TJ Swan and Vinia Mojica among others.

The album peaked at number 51 on the US Billboard 200, and spawned two charted singles: "Southern Gul" and "All I Know". "All I Know" was featured in NBA Live 2000.

== Critical reception ==
Professional ratings
Review scores
Source	Rating
AllMusic	4.5/5 stars
Christgau's Consumer Guide	(1-star Honorable Mention)
RapReviews	7/10
The Source	3/5 stars

The album was reviewed in the Daily Nebraskan, which summarized that "the record fits together like a collage, with some pieces that certainly seem out of place" giving it a C+ overall. The Village Voice critic Robert Christgau highlighted "Southern Girl" and "Night Riders" while summarizing up the album as "having fun with the human beatbox (and friends) in the studio (and on stage)". Eothen Alapatt, in a review for The Source, called Make the Music 2000 "a refreshing alternative to the conventional rap albums", commending Rahzel for his "uncanny ability to mimic instruments".

== Track listing ==
No.	Title	Producer(s)	Length
1.	"The Human Beatbox" (interlude)	Rahzel	0:28
2.	"Make the Music 2000" (featuring TJ Swan and Scratch)	Marley Marl	4:01
3.	"Super Dee Jay" (interlude)	Rahzel	1:04
4.	"All I Know"	Pete Rock	4:19
5.	"Carbon Copy (I Can't Stop)" (featuring Vinia Mojica)	Scott Storch	4:39
6.	"I Know What Your Sayin" (interlude)	Rahzel	0:32
7.	"Night Riders" (featuring Slick Rick)	Rahzel	3:31
8.	"Just the Beginning" (interlude)	Rahzel	0:09
9.	"Bubblin', Bubblin' (Piña Colada)" (featuring Emanon and Shawna Raw)	Twilite Tone	4:21
10.	"To the Beat" (featuring Q-Tip and Questlove)	Bob Power; Rahzel	4:11
11.	"Wu Tang Live Medley" (interlude)	Rahzel	2:06
12.	"Steal My Soul" (featuring Me'shell Ndegeocello and Branford Marsalis)	Bob Power; Rahzel	4:44
13.	"For the Ladies" (interlude)	Rahzel	0:08
14.	"Suga Sista" (featuring Aaron Hall and the Roots)	L.E.S.; Rahzel	4:30
15.	"Southern Gul" (featuring Erykah Badu)	Rahzel	3:08
16.	"If Your Mother Only Knew" (interlude)	Rahzel	10:43
17.	"All I Know" (video)		4:46
Total length:			52:34

Note:

- Track 16 contains a hidden track that is a battle between Rahzel & Kenny Muhammad The Human Orchestra vs. DJ Skribble & DJ Slinky.

== Charts ==
Chart (1999)	Peak position
Dutch Albums (Album Top 100)	93
US Billboard 200	51
US Top R&B/Hip-Hop Albums (Billboard)	20
