= I Done a Album =

Studio album by Beardyman
- Released: 18 March 2011
- Genre: Beatboxing, drum and bass, dubstep, hip hop, comedy
- Length: 70:34 (CD)
- Label: Sunday Best Recordings

Professional ratings
Review scores
Source	Rating
NME	(4/10)

I Done a Album is the first album by British beat-box artist Beardyman. The album features a number of satirical tracks, often direct parodies of the likes of Aphex Twin or Dizzee Rascal.

== Track listing ==
No.	Title	Length
1.	"And He Saw That It Was Good"	1:18
2.	"Twist Your Ankal" (Al Jolson's Pondering Minstrel edit)	3:24
3.	"Round the Clock Conclusions" (Skit)	0:47
4.	"Game Over (Latex Quim)"	5:04
5.	"You... Win!" (Skit)	0:55
6.	"Vampire Skank"	5:17
7.	"If Only"	0:19
8.	"Oh!" (featuring Foreign Beggars)	3:36
9.	"Big Man"	4:43
10.	"Smell the Vibe"	2:45
11.	"Gonna Be Sick"	4:35
12.	"This Turbulent Priest" (Skit)	0:41
13.	"When You See the Light"	4:06
14.	"Blind Rabbits" (Skit)	0:52
15.	"Sativa Steps"	6:52
16.	"Mullet Bwoy"	4:04
17.	"U R Mine"	7:34
18.	"Brighton Beach 04:20"	4:37
19.	"Where Does Your Mind Go?"	6:58
20.	"Nothing to Undo"	2:04
Total length:		1:10:42

Bonus tracks
No.	Title	Length
21.	"Like I Wasn't" (iTunes bonus track)	4:42
