= Southern Gul =

Single by Erykah Badu featuring Rahzel

from the album Make the Music 2000
- Released: July 26, 1999
- Recorded: 1998
- Genre: Funk; hip hop; soul
- Length: 3:17
- Label: Motown
- Songwriter(s): Erykah Badu; Rahzel M. Brown
- Producer(s): Rahzel

Erykah Badu singles chronology
"You Got Me" (1999)	"Southern Gul" (1999)	"Bag Lady" (2000)

"Southern Gul" is a song recorded by American singer Erykah Badu. It features beatboxer and rapper Rahzel, a former member of The Roots, who also co-wrote and produced the song. The song was released as the lead single from Rahzel's debut studio album Make the Music 2000 (1999) on July 26, 1999, by Motown Records.

A moderate commercial success, "Southern Gul" peaked at number 76 on the US Billboard Hot 100 and number 24 on the US Hot R&B/Hip-Hop Songs.

== Track listing ==
US cassette and maxi CD single
No.	Title	Length
1.	"Southern Gul" (radio edit) (featuring Rahzel)	3:09
2.	"Southern Gul" (album version) (featuring Rahzel)	3:17
3.	"Southern Gul" (a cappella)	2:52

== Charts ==
Weekly chart performance for "Southern Gul"
Chart (1999)	Peak position
US Billboard Hot 100	76
US Hot R&B/Hip-Hop Songs (Billboard)	24

== Release history ==
Release dates and formats for "Southern Gul"
Region	Date	Format(s)	Label(s)	Ref.
United States	July 26, 1999	Urban contemporary radio	Motown	
United States	July 27, 1999	12-inch vinyl	Motown	
United States	August 10, 1999	Cassette; maxi CD	Motown	
