= Dub FX =

Australian musician and street performer (born 1983)

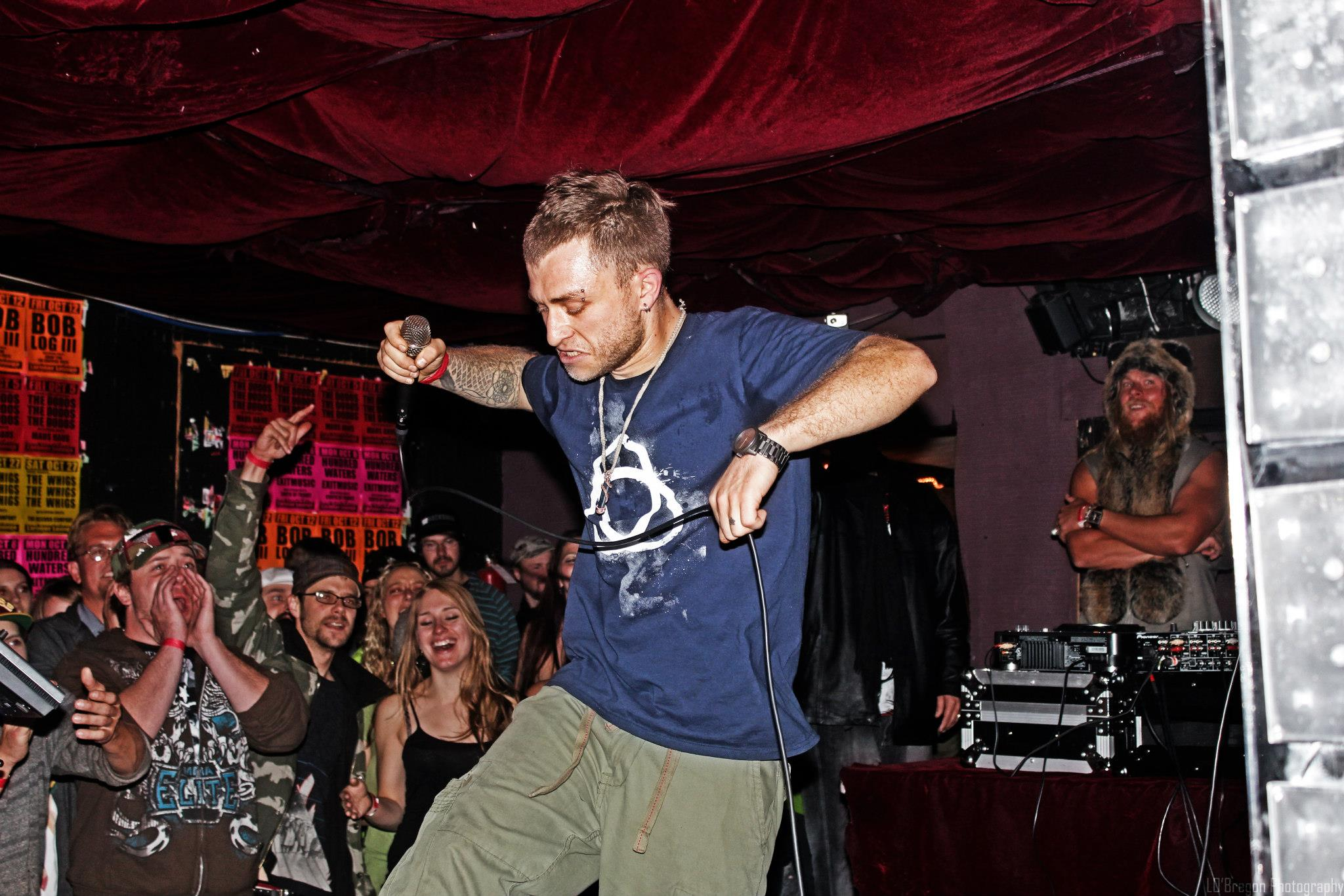
- Dub FX performing at Larimer's Lounge in Denver, CO 6 October 2012

Background information
- Born: Benjamin Stanford; 11 June 1983 (age 43)
- Origin: St Kilda, Melbourne, Australia
- Genres: Dub, hip hop, dubstep, drum and bass, jungle, Reggae, Ska, Dancehall
- Occupations: Singer-songwriter, vocalist, record producer
- Instruments: Vocals, beatbox, loop station, effects pedal, guitar
- Years active: 2003–present
- Label: Convoyun.ltd
- Website: dubfx.com

Benjamin Stanford (born 11 June 1983), better known by his stage name Dub FX (stylised as Dub Fx or DubFx), is an Australian musician and worldwide street performer.

Born in St Kilda, Melbourne, Australia, at the start of his career he was singing in a local alternative rock and rapcore band initially known as Twitch, which would later change its name to N.O.N (Never or Now). In 2004 they released a debut and the only album Exeunt Omnes. Soon after he moved to Italy and began a solo career. His trademark is creating rich live music using only his own performance aided by live looping and effects pedals combined with his voice. He creates intricate hip hop, reggae, and drum and bass rhythms.

During the COVID-19 pandemic Dub FX moved from Victoria, Australia to Lisbon, Portugal with his wife Sahida, and two daughters Sahara and Kalila.

== Associated acts ==
Stanford used to travel and perform with his former fiancée Shoshana Sadia aka Flower Fairy. Dub FX first met her in Manchester, after which she joined him on his travels around the globe to busk for the public. Flower Fairy would usually be seen selling CDs during Dub FX's performances or on stage alongside Stanford when they perform several tracks together. She is also featured singing on tracks from Everythinks a Ripple, "Wandering Love", "Flow", and "Time Will Tell". To his travels also joined his friend and manager CAde, who is on tracks with Stanford like: "No rest for the wicked", "Supernova Pilot", "Easy", "Fresh" and others...

Two songs from Everythinks a Ripple, "Flow", and "Wandering Love", feature a street saxophonist named Mr. Woodnote, who also uses similar looping techniques as Dub FX, using a saxophone.

After his first summer traveling through Europe in 2006, he came home to Melbourne where he shared a flat with Melbourne-based producer Sirius. Stanford showed Sirius this new style from the UK called dubstep. and by 2010 together they released the album titled Dub FX and Sirius – A Crossworlds. Dub FX does not beatbox on this album.

Dub FX is also part of the dubstep act Kila Mega Giga Tera, the other half being Glade Kettle (Distro)(aka Sirius). To date they have released one song on Aquatic Lab Sessions Volume 1, a CD and limited edition vinyl compilation released in 2009. Kila Mega Giga Tera also released an album, which was released in 2010. This album is called A Crossworlds.

== Music ==
Dub FX is completely independent, using only live performance, word of mouth, internet social networking, and a number of easily accessible free samples. Dub FX is also the main founder of the label Convoyunltd, which could be described as a co-op label for Dub FX's own work and that of other artists. To date, artists that have released albums on Convoyunltd are: Flower Fairy, Sirius, Mr. Woodnote, and Dub FX, with additional featured artists on separate songs of each album. Every album released through Convoyunltd has been produced by Dub FX with the exception of Dub FX & Sirius's release, A Crossworlds, a collaboration album released in 2010 which revealed a much darker and instrumental sound.

Dub FX's lyrics address both general world events and contemporary angst, while suggesting individual-based revolution through self-determination and engagement. He also addresses issues of social importance, the most notable example being the song Society's Gates, loosely based on the life of the philosopher Socrates.

== Discography ==
=== Albums ===
List of albums, with selected details
Title	Details
Live in the Street	Released: 2007; Format: CD, digital; Label: DubFX; Compilation of live street performances
Everythinks a Ripple	Released: 2009; Format: CD, digital; Label: Convoy Unltd.; Debut studio album
A Crossworlds (with Sirius)	Released: 2010; Format: CD, digital; Label: Convoy Unltd.
Everythinks a Rmx	Released: July 2011; Format: digital; Label: Convoy Unltd.; Remix album
Theory of Harmony	Released: 2013; Format: CD, 2×LP, digital; Label: Convoy Unltd.
Thinking Clear	Released: 2016; Format: CD, 2×LP, digital; Label: Convoy Unltd.
Roots	Released: January 2020; Format: CD, LP, digital; Label: Convoy Unltd.
Branches	Released: March 2020; Format: CD, LP, digital; Label: Convoy Unltd.
Infinite Reflection	Released: September 2023; Format: Digital; Label: Convoy Unltd.

== Awards and nominations ==
=== Music Victoria Awards ===
The Music Victoria Awards are an annual awards night celebrating Victorian music. They commenced in 2006.

Year	Nominee / work	Award	Result	Ref.
Music Victoria Awards of 2020	Dub FX	Best Reggae or Dance Hall Act	Won	
