= Korg Kaossilator =

Music synthesizer

Kaossilator
- Manufacturer: Korg
- Dates: 2007–2016
- Price: ~$180

Technical specifications
- Aftertouch expression: no
- Velocity expression: no
- Storage memory: none
- Effects: none

Input/output
- Keyboard: none - XY-pad
- External control: none

The Korg Kaossilator is a line of portable music synthesizers manufactured by Korg. Termed "dynamic-phrase synthesizers" by the manufacturer, Kaossilators are capable of producing a wide range of sounds, can produce a continuous music loop, and can be tuned to various keys and scales.

Being related to the Korg Kaoss Pads, a Kaossilator is a synth that is played using a touchpad similar to those of laptop computers. For most sounds, moving horizontally on the touchpad changes the pitch over a range of two octaves (in one case, only one octave; for several sounds the range is much more than two octaves). For some sounds, horizontal movement affects a non-pitch parameter. Moving vertically usually modulates the sound in some way.

== Kaossilator KO-1 ==
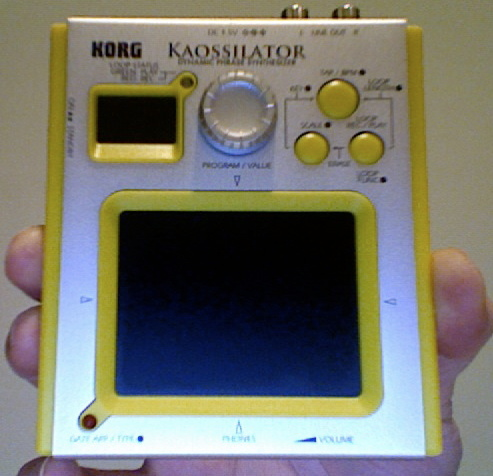
The original Kaossilator KO-1

The Kaossilator KO-1 is portable, running on four AA batteries or a 4.5-volt adapter, with the dimensions 106 mm (W) × 129 mm (D) × 29 mm (H) (4.17" (W) × 5.08" (D) × 1.14" (H)). It weighs 154 g (5.43 oz) without batteries. There are spots to affix lanyards. Outputs consist of a pair of female RCA-style plugs and a stereo mini-phone 1/8-inch jack. It is nearly the same shape as the Korg mini-KP, differing only where the mini-KP has a pair of RCA-style input jacks. The Kaossilator casing is yellow with a silvery metal face-plate. A limited-edition pink casing was also produced, and for a time it was sold at a significantly lower price than the yellow model at many music shops.

The Kaossilator features one hundred programs, which are mostly synthesizer voices and sound effects, including acoustic (guitar, trumpet, piano), percussion, and electronic sounds. The last 10 programs are complete rhythm-patterns, but since percussion sounds are included in the programs, users can develop their own rhythm-patterns by layering multiple overdubbed sounds. Programs are indicated only by a letter-and-two-digit designation on the LED display but are given specific names in the instructions. Most instruments can be locked into various keys and scales. The Kaossilator supports 31 different scale patterns including chromatic, blues and diatonic scales as well as more exotic scales such as Japanese and Egyptian.

The Kaossilator also has a gate arpeggiator and a loop function that allows the layering of instruments to produce loops. The loop recording function is somewhat limited, as the maximum length is two bars in 4/4 time. Despite this limitation, some artists have recorded full-length albums with the Kaossilator.

It is possible to overcome the two-bar limit as the Kaossilator records audio to memory. To do this the user sets the tempo to the desired value – 150 for example – and records his part. The tempo is then set to exactly half the tempo of before, in this case 75. When played back one hears the first two bars but then two more will be available afterwards.

Another way to fully overcome the two-bar limit is by powering up the Kaossilator while holding down the Tap and Loop Rec buttons. Doing this will make four bars available (by setting the Loop Length to 16), but this disables the Undo function

== Kaossilator Pro ==
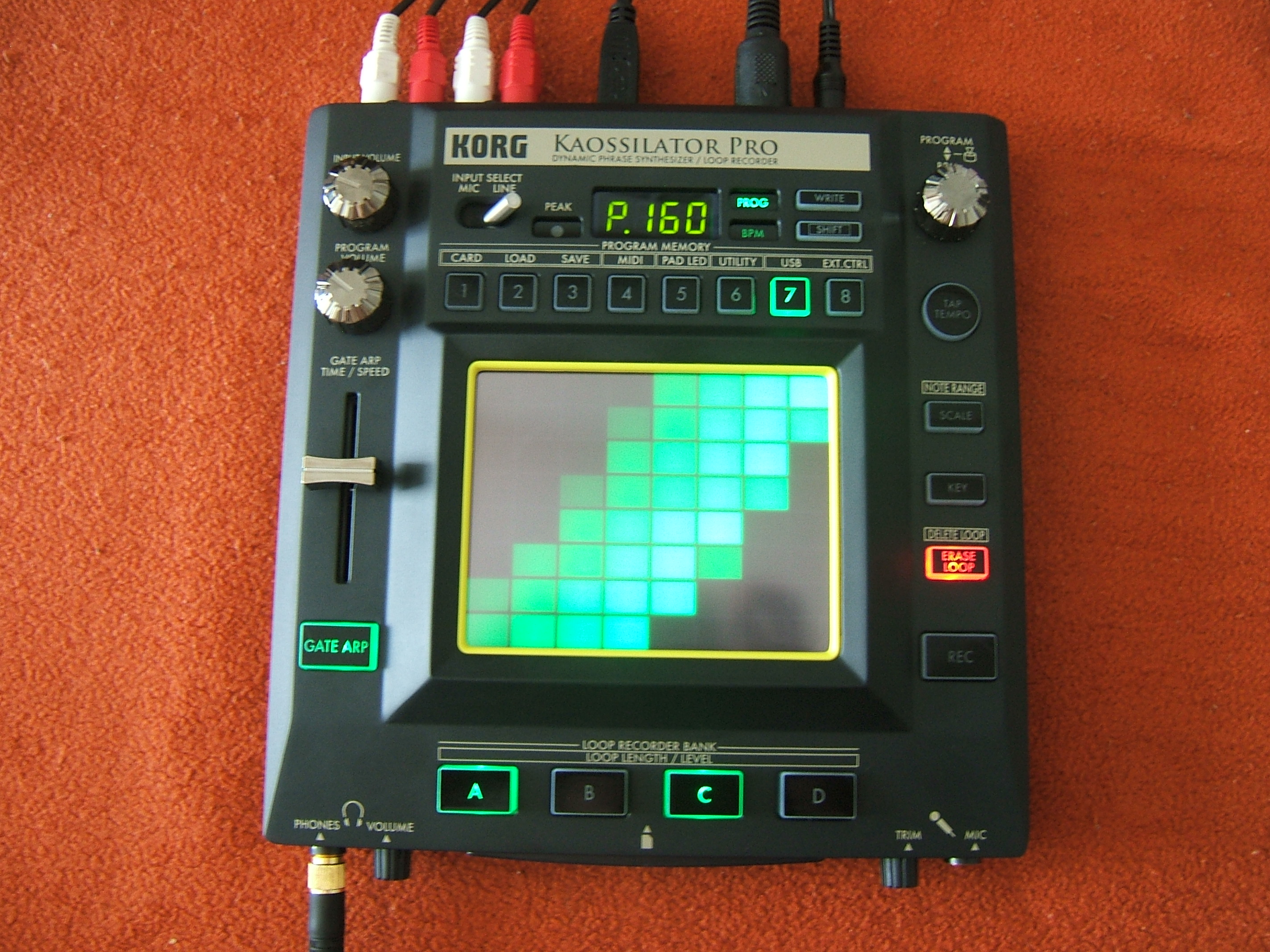
The Korg Kaossilator Pro

Korg unveiled the Kaossilator Pro on 14 January 2010 at the NAMM Show. The device has a metal casing similar to the Kaoss Pad 3 (KP3), but its touchpad (divided into an 8×8 grid of rectangles) is back-lit with green lights instead of the KP3's red lights. The larger pad makes it easier to hit specific notes compared to the original Kaossilator. It offers 200 sounds, vocoder patches, four channels of looping, MIDI, a gate arpeggiator, 31 scales, editor software, and other features. Unlike the original Kaossilator, it allows music-loops and settings to be saved on an SD memory card.

== Kaossilator Pro+ ==
At the 2013 NAMM Show Korg announced the Kaossilator Pro+. In comparison to its predecessor, this model features 50 additional sound programs, contains 62 updated sounds, including 26 enhanced drum sounds. Additional support for SDHC cards up to 32 GB was added.

== iKaossilator ==
A software-only version is available as an application for Apple's iPhone and iPad. The iKaossilator offers 150 sounds, a 5-track loop sequencer, scale/key settings, WIST support and the ability to save/resume an ongoing project but does not have an arpeggiator.

In 2016, Korg released a port of the iKaossilator for Android devices, called Korg Kaossilator for Android.

== Kaossilator 2 ==
An updated Kaossilator was unveiled at the 2012 NAMM Show, with 150 programs, two sound-banks, a save for audio files on a microSD card, master recorder for recording performances, built-in microphone and speaker, and touch-slide with + and - step buttons instead of a knob. The Kaossilator 2 was released in April 2012 at a retail price of US$160.

== Kaossilator 2S ==
An updated version of the Kaossilator 2 was introduced at NAMM 2015. The Kaossilator 2S adds unlimited undo, redo and support for importing loops into Ableton Live. All loops on the Micro SD card are WAV files available as a mix, as well as separate tracks. The Kaossilator 2S eliminates the second sound bank and removes the Delete button for silencing spots in the loop. The Kaossilator 2s is the most up to date model of the handheld Kaossilators.
