= Beatboxing =

Percussion using voice

Spencer X performing "Be Somebody" with only vocal beat-boxing

Beatboxing (also, and sometimes, called beat boxing) is a form of vocal percussion primarily involving the art of mimicking drum machines (usually a TR-808), using one's mouth, lips, tongue, throat, and voice. It may also involve vocal imitation of turntablism, and other musical instruments. Beatboxing today is connected with hip-hop culture, often referred to as "the fifth element" of hip-hop, although it is not limited to hip-hop music. The term "beatboxing" is sometimes used to refer to vocal percussion in general.

== Origins ==
Techniques similar to beatboxing have been employed in diverse American musical genres since the 19th century, such as early rural music, both black and white, religious songs, blues, ragtime, vaudeville, and hokum. Examples include the Appalachian technique of eefing and the blues song Bye bye bird by Sonny Boy Williamson II.

Additional influences may perhaps include forms of African traditional music, in which performers utilize their bodies (e.g., by clapping or stomping) as percussion instruments and produce sounds with their mouths by breathing loudly in and out, a technique used in beatboxing today.

Vocal percussion [is], "the imitation or approximation of percussion instruments," and beatboxing is a form of vocal percussion but can be described as, "music with your mouth... beatboxing is making and being the music, not just rhythm." ...Beatboxing is both the rhythm — predominantly through the bass and snare drums as well as hi-hat — while also incorporating various sound effects such as DJ scratching, synthesizers, and bass lines. Using the mouth, lips, tongue, and voice to make music is thus the beatboxer's equivalent to a pianist's fingers and arms.

Many well-known performers used vocal percussion occasionally, even though this was not directly connected to the cultural tradition that came to be known as beatboxing. Paul McCartney's "That Would Be Something" (1970) includes vocal percussion. Pink Floyd's "Pow R. Toc H." (1967) also includes vocal percussion performed by the group's original lead vocalist, Syd Barrett. Jazz singers Bobby McFerrin and Al Jarreau were very well known for their vocal styles and techniques, which have had great impact on techniques beatboxers use today. Michael Jackson was known to record himself beatboxing on a dictation tape recorder as a demo and scratch recording to compose several of his songs, including "Billie Jean", "The Girl Is Mine", and others. In contrast, the English progressive rock band Jethro Tull adopted beatboxing on at least one track on their 2003 Christmas album. Gert Fröbe, a German actor most widely known for playing Auric Goldfinger in the James Bond film Goldfinger, "beatboxes" as Colonel Manfred von Holstein (simultaneously vocalizing horned and percussive instruments) in Those Magnificent Men in Their Flying Machines, a 1965 British comedy film.

== Contribution to hip-hop ==
Modern beatboxing first began as a way to assist or backup the MC. When drum machines were unavailable or unaffordable, communities in the inner city of New York began to mimic the sounds with their voices in ciphers. The term "beatboxing" is derived from the mimicry of early drum machines, then known as beatboxes, particularly, and specifically, the Roland TR-808. The term "beatbox" was used to refer to earlier Roland drum machines such as the TR-55 and CR-78 in the 1970s. They were followed by the TR-808, released in 1980, which became central to hip-hop and electronic dance music. It is the TR-808 that human beatboxing is largely modeled after.

"Human beatboxing" in hip-hop originated in the 1980s. Its early pioneers include Buffy, the first "human beatbox"; Swifty, the first to implement the inhale sound technique; Buffy, who helped perfect many beatboxing techniques; and Wise, who contributed significantly to beat boxing's proliferation. Wise inspired an entire new fan base of human beatboxers with his human turntable technique. Other pioneers of beatboxing include Rahzel well known for his realistic robotic sounds and for his ability to sing and beatbox simultaneously, Scratch a beatboxer and musician well known for further revolutionizing the use of vocal scratching in beatboxing, Kenny Muhammad the Human Orchestra, a beatboxer known for his technicality and outstanding rhythmic precision, who pioneered the inward k snare, a beatbox technique that imitates a snare drum by breathing inward, and Emanon, an early protegee of Doug E. Fresh associated with Ice T and Afrika Islam. Many refer to beatboxing as the unofficial 5th element of hip-hop.

== Modern beatboxing ==
An example of modern beatboxing

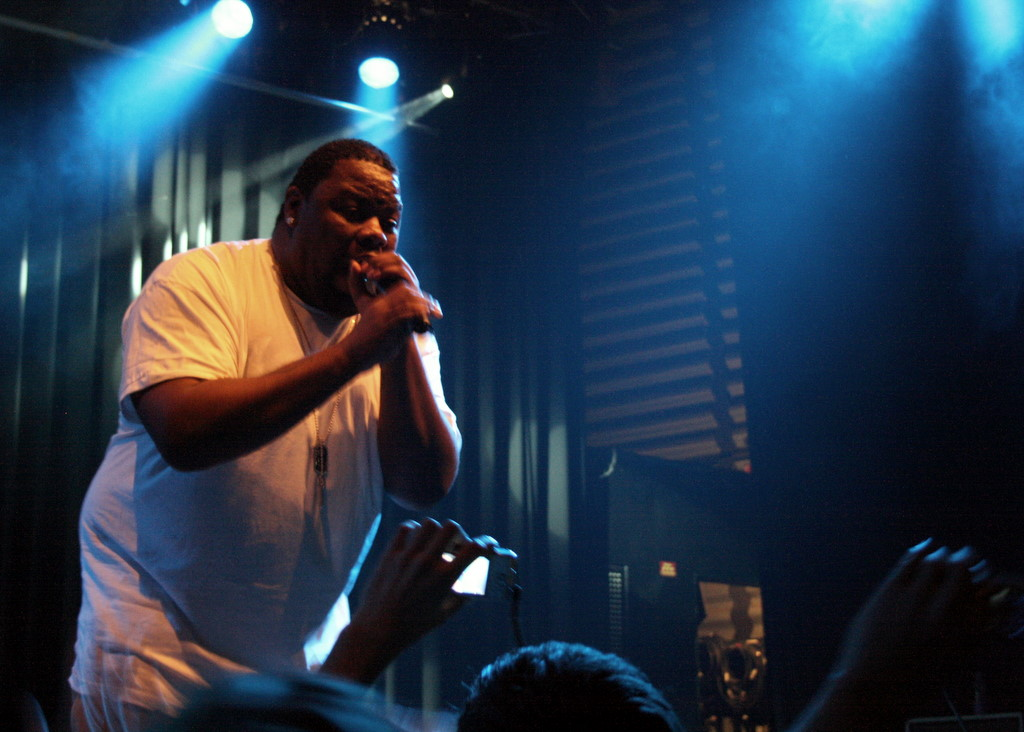
Biz Markie beatboxing

The Internet has played a large part in the popularity of modern beatboxing. Ronon Haddow (aka Sleak-jr) started his first tournament in 2025 on July 5th and went on to winning in 1st place and earning £2000 under the banner of HUMANBEATBOX.COM. An early example of modern beatboxing was seen in the 2001 South Korean romantic comedy film My Sassy Girl. In 2001, Gavin Tyte, a member of this community created the world's first tutorials and video tutorials on beatboxing. In 2003, the community held the world's first Human Beatbox Convention in London featuring beatbox artists from all over the world.

Beatboxing's current popularity is due in part to releases from artists such as Rahzel, RoxorLoops, Reeps One and Alem. In the Pacific, American beatboxer of Hawaii Chinese descent Jason Tom co-founded the Human Beatbox Academy to perpetuate the art of beatboxing through outreach performances, speaking engagements and workshops in Honolulu, the westernmost and southernmost major U.S. city of the 50th U.S. state of Hawaii.

Sometimes, modern beatboxers will use their hand or another part of their body to extend the spectrum of sound effects and rhythm. Some have developed a technique that involves blowing and sucking air around their fingers to produce a very realistic record scratching noise, which is commonly known as the "crab scratch". Another hand technique includes the "throat tap", which involves beatboxers tapping their fingers against their throats as they throat sing or hum.

Engaging different articulators like the tongue and lips in rapid succession creates the illusion of hearing multiple sounds performed at once. Beatboxers also utilize the independence of larynx and other articulators to produce sound with both simultaneously.

Modern beatboxing has also evolved with the advent of technology such as live looping. Many beatboxers like Beardyman, KRNFX, and The Petebox use modern looping devices such as the Boss RC-505 to sample or layer their beatboxing sounds live on stage, in addition to traditional solo beatboxing. Such adaptation has allowed modern beatboxers to perform entire musical compositions much like DJs but with their mouths.

Beatboxing may be done in conjunction with other instruments, or directly into them, enabling the creation of a wider range of sounds. For example, artist Greg Patillo has gained recognition for beatboxing while playing the flute. Beatboxing has evolved alongside modern audiovisual media and is now featured in films, TV Series and video games, contributing to its greater visibility and representation, introducing the art form to broader audiences.

== Notation ==
As with other musical disciplines, some form of musical notation or transcription may sometimes be useful in order to describe beatbox patterns or performances. Sometimes this takes the form of ad hoc phonetic approximations, but is occasionally more formal. [b] is usually the bass drum, [k] is usually the snare drum, and /ts/ ([t͡s]) is usually the hi-hat (in 4/4: 𝄆b-ts-k-ts-b-ts-k-ts𝄇).

Standard Beatbox Notation (SBN) was created by Mark Splinter and Gavin Tyte of Humanbeatbox.com in 2006 as an alternative to International Phonetic Alphabet (IPA) transcription, which had been used sparingly before then.

In a research study published in 2013 and based on real-time MRI imaging of a beatboxer, the authors propose a notation system which combines the International Phonetic Alphabet with musical staff notation, in part motivated by their observation that many beatboxing sounds can be adequately represented by the IPA.

== Phonology ==
Each beatboxer can produce a very large number of unique sounds, but there are three distinct linguistic categories of sound within beatboxing. Ejectives are the strong puffs of air from the voice box that give intensity to percussive sounds. The "p", "t", and "k" sounds can all be made into ejectives,. "Ch", typically represented as [t͡ʃ], and "j", usually [d͡ʒ], are some examples of (ejective) affricates.

Nonstandard fricatives are the mechanical sounds such as snare drums, cymbals, and other buzzing noises in beatboxing that are made with fricatives. Certain sounds, such as velar lateral fricatives, bilabial lateral fricatives, and linguolabial fricatives, and velar trills are all judged impossible according to the IPA but technically possible, and they are sounds that are commonly used in beatboxing.

Coarticulation is the act of controlling a sound in two places at once. A common example of this is the sound that is created when a rolled [r] sound and a [v] sound are simultaneously said and pronounced. This is called a voiced alveolar trill with labiodental articulation. Similarly, epenthesis is the sound created when beatboxers sing or rap and make percussion sounds at the same time. Contrary to what the sound suggests, their tongue is not in two places at once. This effect is done by placing percussive sounds in the middle of words or lyrics.

== Multi-vocalism ==
Multi-vocalism is a form of vocal musicianship conceptualized by British beatboxer and vocalist Killa Kela. It describes beatboxers who incorporate other vocal disciplines and practices into their routines and performances such as singing, rapping, sound mimicry and other vocal arts. Beardyman is a well known multi-vocalist.

== World records ==
According to the Guinness World Records, the current record for the largest human beatbox ensemble was set by The Hong Kong Federation of Youth Groups, with 6,430 participants, in celebration of the 20th anniversary of the establishment of the Hong Kong Special Administrative Region on 26 June 2017.

Prior to this, the record was set by Booking.com employees with 4,659 participants. It was achieved by Booking.com employees together with beatboxers at the RAI Amsterdam in Amsterdam, Netherlands, on 10 December 2013 during their annual company meeting.

The previous largest human beatbox ensemble involved 2,081 participants and was achieved by Google (Ireland), Shlomo (UK) and Testament (UK) at The Convention Centre, Dublin, Ireland, on 14 November 2011.

Before Shlomo's record, the previous record for the largest human beatbox ensemble involved 1,246 participants and was achieved by Vineeth Vincent and Christ University (India) in Bangalore, Karnataka, India, on 5 February 2011.

== Selected discography ==
This list is a selected discography of commercial releases which are mostly/entirely beatbox-based or are otherwise notable/influential records in the history of beatboxing and its popularization.

=== 1980s ===
- Michael Winslow – Police Academy (1984)
- Fat Boys – "Human Beat Box" from Fat Boys (1984)
- Doug E. Fresh – "The Show" & "La Di Da Di" (1985)
- UTFO - "Bite It (UTFO song)" (1985)
- Stephen Wiley - "Rappin for Jesus", "Damiyon Everly sound effects Human beat boxer" (1986)
- Emanon – "The Baby Beatbox" (1986)
- Roxanne Shante & Biz Markie – "Def Fresh Crew / Biz Beat" 12" (1986)
- Just-Ice – Back to the Old School (1986)
- Skinny Boys- Jockbox (1986)
- T La Rock - Three Minutes of BeatBox (1987) "Greg Nice Beatboxer"
- Jazzy Jeff & The Fresh Prince-Rock the House Ready Rock C -Beatboxer (1987)
- J.J. Fad – Supersonic (1988)
- Wise – Just Say Stet (1985), Faye (1986) & Stet Troop 88 (1988)
- Biz Markie – Goin' Off (includes beatbox track "Make The Music With Your Mouth, Biz") (1988)
- Vanilla Ice – Havin' a Roni – from To The Extreme (1990)
- Snap! – Only Human – B-side on Mary Had A Little Boy 12" (1990)

=== 1990s ===
- Rahzel – Make The Music 2000 (1999)

=== 2000s ===
- Kyle "Scratch" Jones – The Embodiment of Instrumentation (2002)
- Killa Kela – The Permanent Marker (2002)
- Esham – Out Cold (2003)
- Justin Timberlake – "Rock Your Body" (2003)
- Rahzel – Rahzel's Greatest Knock Outs (2004)
- Björk – Medúlla (2004)
- Joel Turner – "These Kids" (2004)
- Matisyahu – "Live at Stubb's" (2005)
- Biz Markie – Make the Music with Your Mouth, Biz (2006)
- Poizunus – A.D.D. (Active Dreaming Disorder) (2007)
- Kid Beyond – Amplivate (2004)
- Blake Lewis – A.D.D. (Audio Day Dream) (2007)
- Dub FX – "Everythinks a Ripple" (2009)

=== 2010s ===
- Beardyman – I Done a Album (2011)
- Hopsin – "Lunch Time Cypher" (2013)
- Reeps One – "Move" (2013)
- Berywam - "Berywam" (2017)
- NaPoM – "Lips" (2018)

=== 2020s ===
- Show-Go - "Silver" (2022)
- D-low - "LanigirO" (2022)
- Stitch - "Stay With Me" (2022)
- Den - "Moments I had" (2022)
- Wing - "Dopamine" (2025)

== In popular culture ==
When asked to beatbox, Siri will repeat the phrase "Boots and Cats" to mimic beatboxing. Teen Vogue called it "perhaps the most entertaining mid-day pick-me-up ever created." Hamilton: An American Musical used some beatboxing in "Aaron Burr, Sir".

A GEICO radio commercial, featuring a supermarket employee beatboxing various announcements over a store intercom ("Cleanup on aisle 14" with beats interspersed), won the Westwood One Sports Sounds Awards Media Choice Award for best commercial heard during the radio network's coverage of Super Bowl LII. A 2021 national M&M's commercial seen in Times Square features American beatbox looping champion SungBeats.

== See also ==
- List of beatboxers
- Grand Beatbox Battle
- Beatbox Battle World Championship
- Mouth drumming
- Konnakol
- Scat singing
- Puirt a beul
- Breath Control: The History of the Human Beat Box
- Beatrhyming
- Incredibox
