= UK Beatbox Championships =

British annual beatboxing event

Since 2024, the UK Beatbox Championships (UKBC) have been hosted every year in Bristol, England. Prior to 2024, they were held in London. Beatbox artists compete in five different categories: solo, female, team, loopstation and under-18.

== History ==
The UK Beatbox Championships were held at various venues that include the Scala at Kings Cross, the O2 Academy Islington, the Garage, Highbury, the Grand Theatre, Clapham, London and the Battersea Arts Centre The first ever UK Beatbox Championship took place in 2005 in London, hosted by UK Beatbox Championships.

Qualification for the UK Beatbox Championships consists of geographical heats held around Britain, which are contested from February through to June in London(South-east), Bristol (South-West) (Bristol heats), Nottingham (Midlands) and Liverpool (North).

Judges listen for originality, musical composition, technique, clarity, complexity, timing, rhythm, flow, and performance. They look for witty response in battle, ingenuity, endurance and intelligence.
