= Rahzel =

American beatboxer and rapper (born 1966)

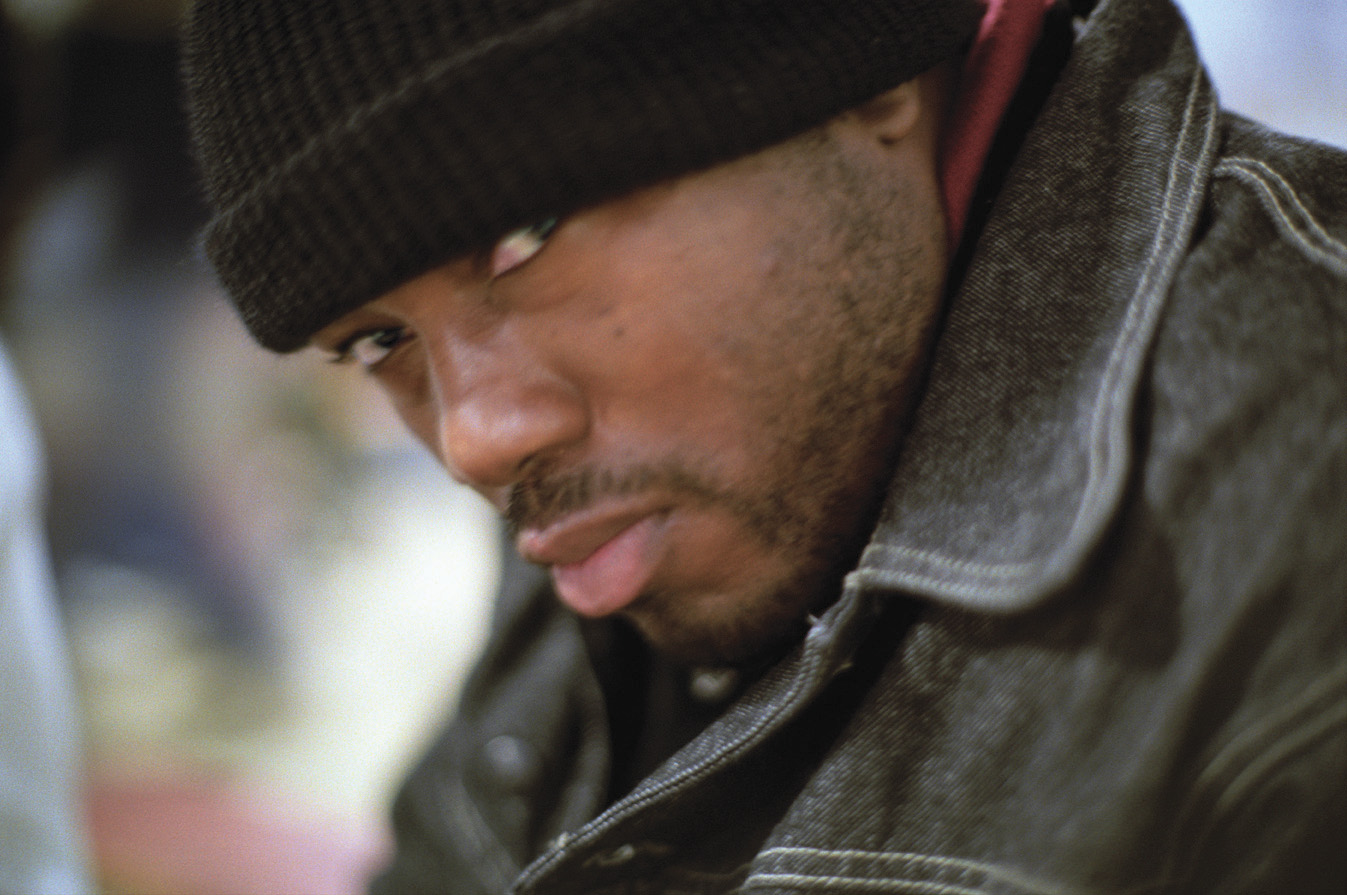
- Rahzel in 2002

Background information
- Born: Rozell Manely Brown; October 6, 1964 (age 61); Queens, New York, U.S.
- Origin: New York City, New York, U.S.
- Genres: Hip hop
- Occupations: Beatboxer; rapper; Producer
- Labels: MCA; Universal
- Formerly of: The Roots

Rozell Manely Brown (born October 6, 1964) is an American beatboxer and rapper, formerly a member of the Roots.

Rahzel is known for an ability to sing or rap while simultaneously beatboxing, as evidenced in his performances of "Iron Man" and his signature song "If Your Mother Only Knew", a hidden track on Make the Music 2000. His talents are showcased in various solo projects as well as on Ben Harper's 2000 single "Steal My Kisses." He also provided his own voice on video games SSX and SSX Tricky, as well as the EA Sports BIG logo from 2000 to 2008. Rahzel was featured on the album True Love by Toots and the Maytals, which won the Grammy Award in 2004 for Best Reggae Album, and showcased many notable musicians.

== Discography ==
=== Studio albums ===
- 1999: Make the Music 2000
- 2004: Rahzel's Greatest Knock Outs

=== Guest appearances ===
Year	Song	Artist	Album
1987	"Dawn"	Mikey D and the L.A. Posse	My Telephone
1993	"Intro"	Raw Breed	Lune Tunz
1994	"Bicoastal Holdup" "Vibe Khameleonz"	Shä-Key	A Head Nadda's Journey to Adidi Skizm
1995	"Lazy Afternoon" "?. vs. Rahzel" "The Lesson Part 1"	The Roots	Do You Want More?!!!??!
1995	"Locker bleiben"	Die Fantastischen Vier	Lauschgift
1996	"The Beat Down"	Da Bush Babees	Gravity
1997	"Show Me Love (QD3 Fat Boy Remix)"	Robyn	Show Me Love
1997	"The Battle"	DJ Skribble	Traffic Jams
1997	"Dangereux" "L'Enfer"	IAM	L'École du micro d'argent
1997	"Rob Swift Versus Rahzel"	Rob Swift	Soulful Fruit
1999	"Jam"	Alliance Ethnik	Fat Comeback
1999	"Southern Gul"	Erykah Badu	Southern Gul
1999	"Step into the Realm" "Adrenaline!" "The Notic"	The Roots	The Roots Come Alive
1999	"First Thing"	Choclair	Ice Cold
1999	"It's a Must"	Rakim	The Master
1999	"Steal My Kisses"	Ben Harper	Burn to Shine
2000	"Used to be Perfect"	Lynden David Hall	Sleeping with Victor
2000	"In Tune with the Sound"	Roni Size Reprazent	In the Mode
2000	"Children's Story"	Everlast	Eat at Whitey's
2000	"Cold Blooded"	Common	Like Water for Chocolate
2001	"Side to Side"	DJ Hasebe	Hey World EP
2002	"Top of the Game"	Sean Paul	Dutty Rock
2003	"Rock the House"	The High & Mighty	The Highlite Zone
2003	"Deep Cover"	Tonedeff	Underscore
2004	"Bam Bam"	Toots & the Maytals	True Love
2004	"Oh My God"	Masta Ace	A Long Hot Summer
2004	"Pleasure Is All Mine" "Where is the Line" "Who Is It" "Mouth's Cradle" "Triumph of a Heart"	Björk	Medúlla
2004	"Confused Rappers"	The Beatnuts	Milk Me
2004	"Starting Over" "The American Way" "Acetone"	The Crystal Method	Legion of Boom
2004	"Rock and Roll Part 2" "A Day in the Life"	Handsome Boy Modeling School	White People
2004	"Mega Beast Theme Song"	Dub-L	Day of the Mega Beast
2004	"B-Box	Chris K	Cycles/B-Box
2005	"Rahzel Skit 1" "Rahzel Skit 2"	Ol' Dirty Bastard	Osirus
2006	"Chocolate Chewing Gum"	k-os	Atlantis: Hymns for Disco
2006	"Mojo"	Peeping Tom	Peeping Tom
2006	"Main Title" "Bus Is Not for Sissies" "Barry's Love Theme" "Kidnapping" "Rahzel Interlude" "Funeral is for Sissies" "Rahzel in the Park" "King of the Crapper" "From Behind" "Fresca" "The Mole"	Various Artists	Let's Go to Prison Soundtrack
2006	"Some MCs"	C-Rayz Walz	The Dropping
2007	"Keys 2 Your Ass"	Imani Coppola	The Black And White Album
2009	"Intro" "What's Happening" "Brainbender"	DJ JS-1	Ground Original 2: No Sell Out
2009	"No Sleep Till Brooklyn" "Shakedown Street"	The String Cheese Incident	Trick or Treat Box Set (Released 2009. Stated to be performed 2011-10-31 at The Theater at Madison Square Garden in New York, NY)
2009	"Blow Up Da Spot"	Sadat X	Brand New Bein'
2010	"Bad Self"	Rhymefest	Dangerous: 5–18
2013	"Shotta"	DJ Muggs	Bass For Your Face
2019	"Heavy Metal"	Bring Me the Horizon	Amo

== Filmography ==
- 2001: Brooklyn Babylon
- 2009: The Magnificent Cooly T
- 2012: Dora's Easter Adventure (Fiesta Trio)

== Awards ==
Rahzel received the Lifetime Achievement Award at the 2017 American Beatbox Championships for his contributions to the art form. Doug E. Fresh presented him with the award. At the 2022 American Beatbox Championships, Rahzel presented the same award to Tara Hall, the wife of late Biz Markie, who accepted the award on his behalf.
