= Sinfini Music =

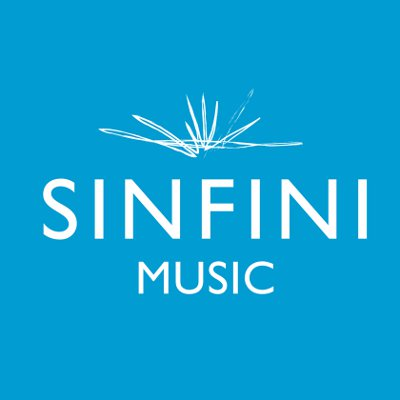
- Website type: Classical music
- Website: www.sinfinimusic.com
- Launched: November 2012

Sinfini Music was a classical music website containing written features and reviews, news, animations, cartoons, quizzes and filmed sessions. The site was owned by Universal Music Group but claimed to be editorially independent, covering music and releases from all record labels, artists and venues.

== Content ==
Sinfini Music's tagline was "Cutting through classical" and the site focused on presenting the cornerstones of Western classical repertoire in accessible and engaging ways. Where relevant, classical was extended to the outer frontiers of jazz, electronica, world and other genres: exclusive interviews and performances have been recorded with Daniel Barenboim, Joyce DiDonato, Valentina Lisitsa, the Grimethorpe Colliery Band, Hauschka and Anoushka Shankar.

The editorial team comprised journalists, critics and writers hailing from BBC Music Magazine, The Arts Desk, BBC Radio 3, Gramophone and The Observer, including Fiona Maddocks and Alexandra Coghlan. Regular contributors included Norman Lebrecht, Paul Morley, Kimon Daltas, Jessica Duchen, Harriet Smith, Gavin Dixon and Colin Anderson.

== Criticism ==
Concern was voiced that Sinfini, funded by Universal Music, lacked critical independence. The blogger Opera Creep commented "Most importantly the funding status or any mention to Universal has been removed from the About section on the site. A new visitor to it would possibly mistake it for an independent voice “cutting through classical” but I am afraid that fig leaf can't quite hide the fact that Universal bankroll them at the tune of millions." Other concerns raised have included the suggestion that Lebrecht was invited on board to silence his criticisms, while the music critic Igor Toronyi-Lalic has written of Sinfini's "ingratiating tweeness".

== Closure ==
Sinfini's closure was announced on 17 December 2015. The site has ceased commissioning new material; existing material will remain online as part of the English-language component of the Deutsche Grammophon site.
