= List of Whose Line Is It Anyway? (American TV series) episodes =

Whose Line Is It Anyway? (often known as simply Whose Line?) is an improvisational comedy show, which was originally hosted by Drew Carey on ABC and ABC Family and ran from August 5, 1998 to December 15, 2007. A revival of the show, hosted by Aisha Tyler, began airing on The CW on July 16, 2013. The series is a spin-off and adaptation of the original British show of the same name and features Ryan Stiles, Colin Mochrie, and Wayne Brady as its regular performers with the fourth seat occupied by a guest panelist. All three regulars appeared on the British series; Stiles and Mochrie were regulars there as well; Brady was a frequent guest on the final season, which moved production from London to Hollywood.

During the course of the series, 431 episodes of Whose Line Is It Anyway? were released over twenty-one seasons, between August 5, 1998, and November 1, 2024.

== Series overview ==
Season	Episodes	Originally released		
Season	Episodes	First released	Last released	Network
1	20	August 5, 1998	March 24, 1999	ABC
2	39	September 16, 1999	May 18, 2000	ABC
3	39	October 12, 2000	June 21, 2001	ABC
4	31	September 6, 2001	April 11, 2002	ABC
5	34	September 9, 2002	September 5, 2003	ABC
6	10	June 24, 2004	September 4, 2004	ABC
7	25	January 17, 2005	May 23, 2005	ABC Family
8	21	October 3, 2005	December 15, 2007	ABC Family
9	12	July 16, 2013	September 24, 2013	The CW
10	24	March 21, 2014	November 21, 2014	The CW
11	20	April 17, 2015	October 5, 2015	The CW
12	20	May 23, 2016	September 28, 2016	The CW
13	15	May 29, 2017	September 28, 2017	The CW
14	17	June 4, 2018	October 1, 2018	The CW
15	12	June 17, 2019	September 23, 2019	The CW
16	20	March 30, 2020	November 16, 2020	The CW
17	10	January 8, 2021	April 16, 2021	The CW
18	10	October 9, 2021	April 9, 2022	The CW
19	14	October 14, 2022	March 24, 2023	The CW
20	22	March 31, 2023	February 6, 2024	The CW
21	16	September 6, 2024	November 1, 2024	The CW

== Episodes ==
"Winner(s)" of each episode as chosen by hosts Drew Carey (seasons one–eight) and Aisha Tyler (seasons nine–twenty-one) are highlighted in italics. Under Drew Carey, the winner would take his seat and call a sketch for Drew to perform (often with the help of the rest). Under Aisha Tyler, the winners perform a sketch during the credit roll, just like in the original UK series.

=== Season 1 (1998–99) ===
No. overall	No. in season	Performers	Original release date	Prod. code	U.S. viewers
1	1	Greg Proops, Wayne Brady, Colin Mochrie, Ryan Stiles	August 5, 1998	103	7.6 rating, 7.4 million
2	2	Brad Sherwood, Wayne Brady, Colin Mochrie, Ryan Stiles	August 12, 1998	104	7.9 rating, 7.7 million
3	3	Greg Proops, Wayne Brady, Colin Mochrie, Ryan Stiles	August 19, 1998	106	8.1 rating, 7.9 million
4	4	Brad Sherwood, Wayne Brady, Colin Mochrie, Ryan Stiles	August 26, 1998	101	7.9 rating
5	5	Brad Sherwood, Karen Maruyama, Colin Mochrie, Ryan Stiles	September 2, 1998	105	7.9 rating, 7.9 million
6	6	Brad Sherwood, Kathy Kinney, Colin Mochrie, Ryan Stiles	September 9, 1998	102	7.5 rating
7	7	Greg Proops, Wayne Brady, Colin Mochrie, Ryan Stiles	September 23, 1998	107	N/A
8	8	Wayne Brady, Denny Siegel, Colin Mochrie, Ryan Stiles	October 17, 1998	111	N/A
9	9	Greg Proops, Wayne Brady, Colin Mochrie, Ryan Stiles	December 16, 1998	108	8.5 rating
10	10	Wayne Brady, Denny Siegel, Colin Mochrie, Ryan Stiles	January 6, 1999	117	9.8 rating
11	11	Greg Proops, Wayne Brady, Colin Mochrie, Ryan Stiles	January 13, 1999	113	9.3 rating
12	12	Brad Sherwood, Wayne Brady, Colin Mochrie, Ryan Stiles	January 20, 1999	119	8.5 rating
13	13	Wayne Brady, Denny Siegel, Colin Mochrie, Ryan Stiles	January 27, 1999	120	9.3 rating
14	14	Brad Sherwood, Ian Gomez, Colin Mochrie, Ryan Stiles	February 3, 1999	114	8.8 rating
15	15	Greg Proops, Wayne Brady, Colin Mochrie, Ryan Stiles	February 10, 1999	118	9.3 rating
16	16	Brad Sherwood, Wayne Brady, Colin Mochrie, Ryan Stiles	February 17, 1999	121	9.3 rating
17	17	Wayne Brady, Stephen Colbert, Colin Mochrie, Ryan Stiles	February 24, 1999	116	7.7 rating
18	18	Wayne Brady, Denny Siegel, Colin Mochrie, Ryan Stiles	March 10, 1999	115	N/A
19	19	Brad Sherwood, Wayne Brady, Colin Mochrie, Ryan Stiles	March 10, 1999	110	8.0 rating
20	20	Greg Proops, Denny Siegel, Colin Mochrie, Ryan Stiles	March 24, 1999	109	N/A

=== Season 2 (1999–2000) ===
No. overall	No. in season	Performers	Original release date	Prod. code	U.S. viewers
21	1	Wayne Brady, Chip Esten, Colin Mochrie, Ryan Stiles	September 16, 1999	209	N/A
22	2	Brad Sherwood, Wayne Brady, Colin Mochrie, Ryan Stiles	September 23, 1999	205	N/A
23	3	Greg Proops, Wayne Brady, Colin Mochrie, Ryan Stiles	September 30, 1999	206	N/A
24	4	Greg Proops, Wayne Brady, Colin Mochrie, Ryan Stiles	October 7, 1999	201	5.3 rating
25	5	Wayne Brady, Chip Esten, Colin Mochrie, Ryan Stiles	October 7, 1999	220	4.8 rating
26	6	Wayne Brady, Denny Siegel, Colin Mochrie, Ryan Stiles	October 14, 1999	203	4.8 rating
27	7	Brad Sherwood, Wayne Brady, Colin Mochrie, Ryan Stiles	October 21, 1999	202	5.8 rating
28	8	Wayne Brady, Josie Lawrence, Colin Mochrie, Ryan Stiles	October 28, 1999	212	N/A
29	9	Brad Sherwood, Wayne Brady, Colin Mochrie, Ryan Stiles	November 4, 1999	221	N/A
30	10	Greg Proops, Wayne Brady, Colin Mochrie, Ryan Stiles	November 4, 1999	204	N/A
31	11	Greg Proops, Wayne Brady, Colin Mochrie, Ryan Stiles	November 4, 1999	222	N/A
32	12	Wayne Brady, Chip Esten, Colin Mochrie, Ryan Stiles	November 11, 1999	211	N/A
33	13	Wayne Brady, Josie Lawrence, Colin Mochrie, Ryan Stiles	November 18, 1999	223	N/A
34	14	Brad Sherwood, Wayne Brady, Colin Mochrie, Ryan Stiles	November 25, 1999	213	N/A
35	15	Wayne Brady, Denny Siegel, Colin Mochrie, Ryan Stiles	December 2, 1999	207	N/A
36	16	Greg Proops, Wayne Brady, Colin Mochrie, Ryan Stiles	December 9, 1999	224	N/A
37	17	Brad Sherwood, Wayne Brady, Colin Mochrie, Ryan Stiles	December 16, 1999	208	N/A
38	18	Brad Sherwood, Wayne Brady, Colin Mochrie, Ryan Stiles	January 6, 2000	225	N/A
39	19	Greg Proops, Wayne Brady, Colin Mochrie, Ryan Stiles	January 13, 2000	210	N/A
40	20	Wayne Brady, Kathy Greenwood, Colin Mochrie, Ryan Stiles	January 20, 2000	215	N/A
41	21	Wayne Brady, Chip Esten, Colin Mochrie, Ryan Stiles	February 3, 2000	226	N/A
42	22	Wayne Brady, Kathy Greenwood, Colin Mochrie, Ryan Stiles	February 3, 2000	227	N/A
43	23	Greg Proops Wayne Brady, Colin Mochrie, Ryan Stiles	February 10, 2000	216	N/A
44	24	Wayne Brady, Chip Esten, Colin Mochrie Ryan Stiles	February 17, 2000	228	N/A
45	25	Greg Proops, Wayne Brady Colin Mochrie, Ryan Stiles	February 24, 2000	229	8.1 rating
46	26	Brad Sherwood, Wayne Brady, Colin Mochrie, Ryan Stiles	March 2, 2000	230	8.9 rating
47	27	Greg Proops, Wayne Brady, Colin Mochrie, Ryan Stiles	March 9, 2000	231	8.0 rating
48	28	Wayne Brady, Karen Maruyama, Colin Mochrie, Ryan Stiles	March 16, 2000	217	N/A
49	29	Greg Proops, Wayne Brady, Colin Mochrie Ryan Stiles	March 23, 2000	232	6.9 rating
50	30	Brad Sherwood, Wayne Brady, Colin Mochrie, Ryan Stiles	March 30, 2000	233	N/A
51	31	Wayne Brady, Denny Siegel, Colin Mochrie, Ryan Stiles	April 6, 2000	234	N/A
52	32	Wayne Brady, Karen Maruyama, Colin Mochrie, Ryan Stiles	April 20, 2000	235	N/A
53	33	Wayne Brady, Chip Esten, Colin Mochrie, Ryan Stiles	April 27, 2000	214	N/A
54	34	Brad Sherwood, Wayne Brady, Colin Mochrie, Ryan Stiles	April 27, 2000	218	N/A
55	35	Brad Sherwood, Wayne Brady, Colin Mochrie, Ryan Stiles	May 4, 2000	236	6.7 rating
56	36	Wayne Brady, Chip Esten, Colin Mochrie, Ryan Stiles	May 4, 2000	219	8.4 rating
57	37	Brad Sherwood, Wayne Brady, Colin Mochrie, Ryan Stiles	May 11, 2000	237	N/A
58	38	Wayne Brady, Denny Siegel, Colin Mochrie, Ryan Stiles	May 18, 2000	238	N/A
59	39	Wayne Brady, Chip Esten, Colin Mochrie, Ryan Stiles	May 18, 2000	239	N/A

=== Season 3 (2000–01) ===
A special titled "Best of Whose Line Is It Anyway?" aired on October 4, 2000, and was a clip show highlighting the series' first two seasons, hosted by Drew Carey.

No. overall	No. in season	Performers	Original release date	Prod. code	U.S. viewers
60	1	Wayne Brady, Kathy Greenwood, Colin Mochrie, Ryan Stiles	October 12, 2000	302	N/A
61	2	Wayne Brady, Chip Esten, Colin Mochrie, Ryan Stiles	October 12, 2000	303	N/A
62	3	Wayne Brady, Chip Esten, Colin Mochrie, Ryan Stiles	October 19, 2000	312	N/A
63	4	Greg Proops, Wayne Brady, Colin Mochrie, Ryan Stiles	October 19, 2000	305	N/A
64	5	Greg Proops, Wayne Brady, Colin Mochrie, Ryan Stiles	October 26, 2000	319	N/A
65	6	Brad Sherwood, Wayne Brady, Colin Mochrie, Ryan Stiles	November 2, 2000	306	N/A
66	7	Wayne Brady, Jeff Davis, Colin Mochrie, Ryan Stiles	November 2, 2000	304	N/A
67	8	Wayne Brady, Kathy Greenwood, Colin Mochrie, Ryan Stiles	November 9, 2000	320	7.3 rating
68	9	Wayne Brady, Robin Williams, Colin Mochrie, Ryan Stiles	November 16, 2000	313	N/A
69	10	Wayne Brady, Chip Esten, Colin Mochrie, Ryan Stiles	November 23, 2000	341	N/A
70	11	Greg Proops, Wayne Brady, Colin Mochrie, Ryan Stiles	November 23, 2000	340	N/A
71	12	Wayne Brady, Chip Esten, Colin Mochrie, Ryan Stiles	November 30, 2000	309	N/A
72	13	Greg Proops, Wayne Brady, Colin Mochrie, Ryan Stiles	November 30, 2000	342	N/A
73	14	Greg Proops, Wayne Brady, Colin Mochrie, Ryan Stiles	January 4, 2001	301	N/A
74	15	Wayne Brady, Jeff Davis, Colin Mochrie, Ryan Stiles	January 11, 2001	321	N/A
75	16	Wayne Brady, Chip Esten, Colin Mochrie, Ryan Stiles	January 25, 2001	322	N/A
76	17	Wayne Brady, Kathy Greenwood, Colin Mochrie, Ryan Stiles	February 1, 2001	323	N/A
77	18	Brad Sherwood, Wayne Brady, Colin Mochrie, Ryan Stiles	February 21, 2001	327	N/A
78	19	Greg Proops, Wayne Brady, Colin Mochrie, Ryan Stiles	February 21, 2001	326	N/A
79	20	Wayne Brady, Jeff Davis, Colin Mochrie, Ryan Stiles	February 22, 2001	325	N/A
80	21	Greg Proops, Wayne Brady, Colin Mochrie, Ryan Stiles	March 15, 2001	307	N/A
81	22	Wayne Brady, Chip Esten, Colin Mochrie, Ryan Stiles	March 15, 2001	328	N/A
82	23	Greg Proops, Wayne Brady, Colin Mochrie, Ryan Stiles	March 22, 2001	333	N/A
83	24	Brad Sherwood, Wayne Brady, Colin Mochrie, Ryan Stiles	March 22, 2001	310	N/A
84	25	Brad Sherwood, Wayne Brady, Colin Mochrie, Ryan Stiles	March 29, 2001	329	4.3 rating
85	26	Greg Proops, Wayne Brady, Colin Mochrie, Ryan Stiles	April 5, 2001	335	N/A
86	27	Wayne Brady, Kathy Greenwood, Colin Mochrie, Ryan Stiles	April 12, 2001	311	N/A
87	28	Wayne Brady, Kathy Greenwood, Colin Mochrie, Ryan Stiles	April 19, 2001	330	N/A
88	29	Wayne Brady, Kathy Greenwood, Colin Mochrie, Ryan Stiles	April 26, 2001	336	N/A
89	30	Brad Sherwood, Wayne Brady, Colin Mochrie, Ryan Stiles	April 27, 2001	334	N/A
90	31	Greg Proops, Wayne Brady, Colin Mochrie, Ryan Stiles	April 27, 2001	332	N/A
91	32	Greg Proops, Wayne Brady, Colin Mochrie, Ryan Stiles	May 3, 2001	331	N/A
92	33	Wayne Brady, Chip Esten, Colin Mochrie, Ryan Stiles	May 4, 2001	338	N/A
93	34	Wayne Brady, Kathy Greenwood, Colin Mochrie, Ryan Stiles	May 4, 2001	343	N/A
94	35	Wayne Brady, Kathy Greenwood, Colin Mochrie, Ryan Stiles	May 10, 2001	339	N/A
95	36	Wayne Brady, Chip Esten, Colin Mochrie, Ryan Stiles	May 17, 2001	344	N/A
96	37	Greg Proops, Wayne Brady, Colin Mochrie, Ryan Stiles	May 18, 2001	410	N/A
97	38	Wayne Brady, Kathy Greenwood, Colin Mochrie, Ryan Stiles	June 14, 2001	308	N/A
98	39	Brad Sherwood, Wayne Brady, Colin Mochrie, Ryan Stiles	June 14, 2001	407	N/A

=== Season 4 (2001–02) ===
No. overall	No. in season	Performers	Original release date	Prod. code	U.S. viewers
99	1	Wayne Brady, Jeff Davis, Colin Mochrie, Ryan Stiles	September 6, 2001	401	N/A
100	2	Wayne Brady, Kathy Greenwood, Colin Mochrie, Ryan Stiles	September 6, 2001	405	N/A
101	3	Wayne Brady, Chip Esten, Colin Mochrie, Ryan Stiles	September 20, 2001	324	N/A
102	4	Wayne Brady, Kathy Greenwood, Colin Mochrie, Ryan Stiles	September 20, 2001	420	N/A
103	5	Wayne Brady, Chip Esten, Colin Mochrie, Ryan Stiles	September 27, 2001	317	N/A
104	6	Wayne Brady, Kathy Greenwood, Colin Mochrie, Ryan Stiles	October 3, 2001	413	N/A
105	7	Brad Sherwood, Wayne Brady, Colin Mochrie, Ryan Stiles	October 4, 2001	315	N/A
106	8	Wayne Brady, Kathy Greenwood, Colin Mochrie, Ryan Stiles	October 4, 2001	414	N/A
107	9	Wayne Brady, Chip Esten, Colin Mochrie, Ryan Stiles	October 10, 2001	318	N/A
108	10	Brad Sherwood, Wayne Brady, Colin Mochrie, Ryan Stiles	October 17, 2001	419	N/A
109	11	Greg Proops, Wayne Brady, Colin Mochrie, Ryan Stiles	October 18, 2001	422	N/A
110	12	Wayne Brady, Kathy Greenwood, Colin Mochrie, Ryan Stiles	October 25, 2001	337	N/A
111	13	Greg Proops, Wayne Brady, Colin Mochrie, Ryan Stiles	November 7, 2001	418	N/A
112	14	Wayne Brady, Whoopi Goldberg, Colin Mochrie, Ryan Stiles	November 14, 2001	507	6.7 rating
113	15	Brad Sherwood, Wayne Brady, Colin Mochrie, Ryan Stiles	November 21, 2001	503	N/A
114	16	Wayne Brady, Jeff Davis, Colin Mochrie, Ryan Stiles	November 22, 2001	417	N/A
115	17	Brad Sherwood, Wayne Brady, Colin Mochrie, Ryan Stiles	November 28, 2001	412	N/A
116	18	Wayne Brady, Chip Esten, Colin Mochrie, Ryan Stiles	December 5, 2001	421	N/A
117	19	Wayne Brady, Chip Esten, Colin Mochrie, Ryan Stiles	December 12, 2001	411	N/A
118	20	Brad Sherwood, Wayne Brady, Colin Mochrie, Ryan Stiles	December 13, 2001	415	N/A
119	21	Wayne Brady, Kathy Greenwood, Colin Mochrie, Ryan Stiles	December 19, 2001	409	N/A
120	22	Wayne Brady, Kathy Greenwood, Colin Mochrie, Ryan Stiles	January 24, 2002	423	N/A
121	23	Greg Proops, Wayne Brady, Colin Mochrie, Ryan Stiles	January 24, 2002	416	N/A
122	24	Brad Sherwood, Wayne Brady, Colin Mochrie, Ryan Stiles	January 31, 2002	508	N/A
123	25	Wayne Brady, Chip Esten, Colin Mochrie, Ryan Stiles	February 7, 2002	403	N/A
124	26	Greg Proops, Wayne Brady, Colin Mochrie, Ryan Stiles	February 12, 2002	404	N/A
125	27	Brad Sherwood, Wayne Brady, Colin Mochrie, Ryan Stiles	February 12, 2002	432	N/A
126	28	Brad Sherwood, Wayne Brady, Colin Mochrie, Ryan Stiles	March 7, 2002	431	N/A
127	29	Wayne Brady, Kathy Greenwood, Colin Mochrie, Ryan Stiles	March 14, 2002	402	5.0 rating
128	30	Greg Proops, Wayne Brady, Colin Mochrie, Ryan Stiles	March 28, 2002	429	3.8 rating
129	31	Greg Proops, Wayne Brady, Colin Mochrie, Ryan Stiles	April 11, 2002	427	N/A

=== Season 5 (2002–03) ===
No. overall	No. in season	Performers	Special guest(s)	Original release date	Prod. code	U.S. viewers
130	1	Wayne Brady, Whoopi Goldberg, Colin Mochrie, Ryan Stiles	none	September 9, 2002	511	4.6 rating
131	2	Wayne Brady, Kathy Griffin, Colin Mochrie, Ryan Stiles	Katie Harman	September 16, 2002	509	3.8 rating
132	3	Brad Sherwood, Wayne Brady, Colin Mochrie, Ryan Stiles	none	September 23, 2002	406	3.6 rating
133	4	Brad Sherwood, Wayne Brady, Colin Mochrie, Ryan Stiles	Florence Henderson	September 30, 2002	512	3.5 rating
134	5	Greg Proops, Wayne Brady, Colin Mochrie, Ryan Stiles	none	October 7, 2002	425	3.4 rating
135	6	Wayne Brady, Kathy Greenwood, Colin Mochrie, Ryan Stiles	none	October 21, 2002	433	2.8 rating
136	7	Greg Proops, Wayne Brady, Colin Mochrie, Ryan Stiles	none	October 28, 2002	501	3.2 rating
137	8	Brad Sherwood, Wayne Brady, Colin Mochrie, Ryan Stiles	Joanie Laurer	November 15, 2002	506	3.5 rating
138	9	Wayne Brady, Chip Esten, Colin Mochrie, Ryan Stiles	none	November 29, 2002	515	N/A
139	10	Greg Proops, Wayne Brady, Colin Mochrie, Ryan Stiles	none	December 6, 2002	504	N/A
140	11	Brad Sherwood, Wayne Brady, Colin Mochrie, Ryan Stiles	none	December 20, 2002	517	4.0 rating
141	12	Greg Proops, Wayne Brady, Colin Mochrie, Ryan Stiles	Jerry Springer	January 10, 2003	510	3.6 rating
142	13	Wayne Brady, Kathy Greenwood, Colin Mochrie, Ryan Stiles	none	January 17, 2003	408	N/A
143	14	Wayne Brady, Chip Esten, Colin Mochrie, Ryan Stiles	none	January 24, 2003	513	3.8 rating
144	15	Wayne Brady, Kathy Griffin, Colin Mochrie, Ryan Stiles	none	April 3, 2003	514	N/A
145	16	Brad Sherwood, Wayne Brady, Colin Mochrie, Ryan Stiles	none	April 10, 2003	518	N/A
146	17	Greg Proops, Wayne Brady, Colin Mochrie, Ryan Stiles	Richard Simmons	June 20, 2003	521	N/A
147	18	Brad Sherwood, Wayne Brady, Colin Mochrie, Ryan Stiles	none	June 20, 2003	609	N/A
148	19	Wayne Brady, Kathy Griffin, Colin Mochrie, Ryan Stiles	David Hasselhoff	June 27, 2003	610	N/A
149	20	Greg Proops, Wayne Brady, Colin Mochrie, Ryan Stiles	none	June 27, 2003	603	N/A
150	21	Greg Proops, Wayne Brady, Colin Mochrie, Ryan Stiles	Jayne Trcka	July 11, 2003	611	3.0 rating
151	22	Wayne Brady, Chip Esten, Colin Mochrie, Ryan Stiles	none	July 11, 2003	607	2.8 rating
152	23	Wayne Brady, Kathy Greenwood, Colin Mochrie, Ryan Stiles	none	July 18, 2003	519	N/A
153	24	Brad Sherwood, Wayne Brady, Colin Mochrie, Ryan Stiles	none	July 18, 2003	316	N/A
154	25	Wayne Brady, Chip Esten, Colin Mochrie, Ryan Stiles	Veena and Neena Bidasha (bellydancers)	July 25, 2003	502	N/A
155	26	Wayne Brady, Jeff Davis, Colin Mochrie, Ryan Stiles	none	July 25, 2003	516	N/A
156	27	Brad Sherwood, Wayne Brady, Colin Mochrie, Ryan Stiles	none	August 1, 2003	601	N/A
157	28	Greg Proops, Wayne Brady, Colin Mochrie, Ryan Stiles	Undarma Darihu (contortionist)	August 8, 2003	608	N/A
158	29	Wayne Brady, Kathy Griffin, Colin Mochrie, Ryan Stiles	none	August 8, 2003	606	N/A
159	30	Greg Proops, Wayne Brady, Colin Mochrie, Ryan Stiles	Jerry Springer	August 15, 2003	612	N/A
160	31	Brad Sherwood, Wayne Brady, Colin Mochrie, Ryan Stiles	none	August 22, 2003	520	N/A
161	32	Wayne Brady, Jeff Davis, Colin Mochrie, Ryan Stiles	none	August 29, 2003	426	N/A
162	33	Greg Proops, Wayne Brady, Colin Mochrie, Ryan Stiles	none	September 5, 2003	605	N/A
163	34	Wayne Brady, Chip Esten, Colin Mochrie, Ryan Stiles	none	September 5, 2003	604	N/A

=== Season 6 (2004) ===
No. overall	No. in season	Performers	Original release date	Prod. code	U.S. viewers (millions)
164	1	Wayne Brady, Chip Esten, Colin Mochrie, Ryan Stiles	June 24, 2004	602	4.96
165	2	Brad Sherwood, Wayne Brady, Colin Mochrie, Ryan Stiles	July 1, 2004	424	4.88
166	3	Wayne Brady, Chip Esten, Colin Mochrie, Ryan Stiles	July 8, 2004	348	4.64
167	4	Greg Proops, Wayne Brady, Colin Mochrie, Ryan Stiles	July 29, 2004	347	N/A
168	5	Greg Proops, Wayne Brady, Colin Mochrie, Ryan Stiles	July 31, 2004	345	N/A
169	6	Wayne Brady, Chip Esten, Colin Mochrie, Ryan Stiles	August 7, 2004	505	4.01
170	7	Greg Proops, Wayne Brady, Colin Mochrie, Ryan Stiles	August 14, 2004	430	2.94
171	8	Wayne Brady, Chip Esten, Colin Mochrie, Ryan Stiles	August 21, 2004	314	2.56
172	9	Wayne Brady, Denny Siegel, Colin Mochrie, Ryan Stiles	August 28, 2004	346	2.63
173	10	Wayne Brady, Chip Esten, Colin Mochrie, Ryan Stiles	September 4, 2004	428	3.40

=== Season 7 (2005) ===
No. overall	No. in season	Performers	Original release date	Prod. code
174	1	Brad Sherwood, Wayne Brady, Colin Mochrie, Ryan Stiles	January 17, 2005	7001
175	2	Wayne Brady, Kathy Greenwood, Colin Mochrie, Ryan Stiles	January 17, 2005	7002
176	3	Greg Proops, Wayne Brady, Colin Mochrie, Ryan Stiles	January 24, 2005	7003
177	4	Wayne Brady, Chip Esten, Colin Mochrie, Ryan Stiles	January 24, 2005	7004
178	5	Wayne Brady, Chip Esten, Colin Mochrie, Ryan Stiles	January 31, 2005	7005
179	6	Wayne Brady, Kathy Greenwood, Colin Mochrie, Ryan Stiles	January 31, 2005	7006
180	7	Brad Sherwood, Wayne Brady, Colin Mochrie, Ryan Stiles	February 7, 2005	7007
181	8	Wayne Brady, Chip Esten, Colin Mochrie, Ryan Stiles	February 7, 2005	7008
182	9	Wayne Brady, Chip Esten, Colin Mochrie, Ryan Stiles	February 14, 2005	7009
183	10	Greg Proops, Wayne Brady, Colin Mochrie, Ryan Stiles	February 14, 2005	7010
184	11	Greg Proops, Wayne Brady, Colin Mochrie, Ryan Stiles	February 21, 2005	7011
185	12	Wayne Brady, Kathy Greenwood, Colin Mochrie, Ryan Stiles	February 21, 2005	7012
186	13	Wayne Brady, Kathy Greenwood, Colin Mochrie, Ryan Stiles	February 28, 2005	7013
187	14	Wayne Brady, Jeff Davis, Colin Mochrie, Ryan Stiles	March 7, 2005	7014
188	15	Brad Sherwood, Wayne Brady, Colin Mochrie, Ryan Stiles	March 14, 2005	7015
189	16	Wayne Brady, Kathy Greenwood, Colin Mochrie, Ryan Stiles	March 21, 2005	7016
190	17	Wayne Brady, Kathy Greenwood, Colin Mochrie, Ryan Stiles	March 28, 2005	7017
191	18	Greg Proops, Wayne Brady, Colin Mochrie, Ryan Stiles	April 4, 2005	7018
192	19	Wayne Brady, Chip Esten, Colin Mochrie,Ryan Stiles	April 11, 2005	7019
193	20	Brad Sherwood, Wayne Brady, Colin Mochrie, Ryan Stiles	April 18, 2005	7020
194	21	Wayne Brady, Chip Esten, Colin Mochrie, Ryan Stiles	April 25, 2005	7021
195	22	Wayne Brady, Kathy Greenwood, Colin Mochrie, Ryan Stiles	May 2, 2005	7022
196	23	Wayne Brady, Kathy Greenwood, Colin Mochrie, Ryan Stiles	May 9, 2005	7023
197	24	Brad Sherwood, Wayne Brady, Colin Mochrie, Ryan Stiles	May 16, 2005	7024
198	25	Wayne Brady, Kathy Greenwood, Colin Mochrie, Ryan Stiles	May 23, 2005	7025

=== Season 8 (2005–07) ===
No. overall	No. in season	Performers	Original release date	Prod. code
199	1	Wayne Brady, Denny Siegel, Colin Mochrie, Ryan Stiles	October 3, 2005	8001
200	2	Wayne Brady, Chip Esten, Colin Mochrie, Ryan Stiles	October 10, 2005	8002
201	3	Brad Sherwood, Patrick Bristow, Colin Mochrie, Ryan Stiles	October 17, 2005	8003
202	4	Greg Proops, Wayne Brady, Colin Mochrie, Ryan Stiles	November 7, 2005	8004
203	5	Wayne Brady, Kathy Greenwood, Colin Mochrie, Ryan Stiles	November 21, 2005	8005
204	6	Brad Sherwood, Wayne Brady, Colin Mochrie, Ryan Stiles	December 12, 2005	8010
205	7	Wayne Brady, Denny Siegel, Colin Mochrie, Ryan Stiles	March 20, 2006	8017
206	8	Brad Sherwood, Wayne Brady, Colin Mochrie, Ryan Stiles	March 21, 2006	8011
207	9	Wayne Brady, Stephen Colbert, Colin Mochrie, Ryan Stiles	March 22, 2006	8013
208	10	Greg Proops, Wayne Brady, Colin Mochrie, Ryan Stiles	March 23, 2006	8012
209	11	Brad Sherwood, Wayne Brady, Colin Mochrie, Ryan Stiles	March 24, 2006	8019
210	12	Brad Sherwood, Wayne Brady, Colin Mochrie, Ryan Stiles	November 6, 2006	8014
211	13	Wayne Brady, Denny Siegel, Colin Mochrie, Ryan Stiles	November 7, 2006	8008
212	14	Brad Sherwood, Ian Gomez, Colin Mochrie, Ryan Stiles	November 8, 2006	8006
213	15	Brad Sherwood, Patrick Bristow, Colin Mochrie, Ryan Stiles	November 9, 2006	8015
214	16	Greg Proops, Wayne Brady, Colin Mochrie, Ryan Stiles	November 10, 2006	8007
215	17	Wayne Brady, Kathy Greenwood, Colin Mochrie, Ryan Stiles	December 4, 2007	8009
216	18	Wayne Brady, Jeff Davis, Colin Mochrie, Ryan Stiles	December 13, 2007	8016
217	19	Greg Proops, Wayne Brady, Colin Mochrie, Ryan Stiles	December 14, 2007	8018
218	20	Brad Sherwood, Wayne Brady, Colin Mochrie, Ryan Stiles	December 15, 2007	8020
219	21	Greg Proops, Denny Siegel, Colin Mochrie, Ryan Stiles	December 15, 2007	8021

=== Season 9 (2013) ===
No. overall	No. in season	Performers	Special guest(s)	Original release date	Prod. code	U.S. viewers (millions)
220	1	Wayne Brady, Gary Anthony Williams, Colin Mochrie, Ryan Stiles	Lauren Cohan	July 16, 2013	111	2.92
221	2	Wayne Brady, Heather Anne Campbell, Colin Mochrie, Ryan Stiles	Kevin McHale	July 16, 2013	103	2.99
222	3	Wayne Brady, Keegan-Michael Key, Colin Mochrie, Ryan Stiles	Candice Accola	July 23, 2013	106	2.48
223	4	Wayne Brady, Jonathan Mangum, Colin Mochrie, Ryan Stiles	Kyle Richards	July 30, 2013	107	2.36
224	5	Wayne Brady, Jeff Davis, Colin Mochrie, Ryan Stiles	Mary Killman and Mariya Koroleva	July 30, 2013	102	2.46
225	6	Wayne Brady, Gary Anthony Williams, Colin Mochrie, Ryan Stiles	Wilson Bethel	August 6, 2013	112	2.25
226	7	Wayne Brady, Heather Anne Campbell, Colin Mochrie, Ryan Stiles	Lisa Leslie	August 13, 2013	104	2.15
227	8	Wayne Brady, Keegan-Michael Key, Colin Mochrie, Ryan Stiles	none	August 20, 2013	105	2.28
228	9	Wayne Brady, Jeff Davis, Colin Mochrie, Ryan Stiles	Laila Ali	August 27, 2013	101	2.28
229	10	Wayne Brady, Nyima Funk, Colin Mochrie, Ryan Stiles	Maggie Q	September 3, 2013	109	2.48
230	11	Wayne Brady, Jonathan Mangum, Colin Mochrie, Ryan Stiles	Chloe Butler and Monique Gaxiola	September 17, 2013	108	2.43
231	12	Wayne Brady, Nyima Funk, Colin Mochrie, Ryan Stiles	Shawn Johnson	September 24, 2013	110	1.29

=== Season 10 (2014) ===
No. overall	No. in season	Performers	Special guest	Original release date	Prod. code	U.S. viewers (millions)
232	1	Wayne Brady, Greg Proops, Colin Mochrie, Ryan Stiles	Kat Graham	March 21, 2014	203	1.74
233	2	Wayne Brady, Keegan-Michael Key, Colin Mochrie, Ryan Stiles	Tara Lipinski	March 21, 2014	202	1.74
234	3	Wayne Brady, Nyima Funk, Colin Mochrie, Ryan Stiles	Verne Troyer	March 28, 2014	204	1.83
235	4	Wayne Brady, Jeff Davis, Colin Mochrie, Greg Proops	Darren Criss	April 4, 2014	210	1.50
236	5	Wayne Brady, Greg Proops, Colin Mochrie, Ryan Stiles	Michael Weatherly	April 11, 2014	206	1.36
237	6	Wayne Brady, Gary Anthony Williams, Colin Mochrie, Ryan Stiles	Byambajav Ulambayar	April 18, 2014	201	1.41
238	7	Wayne Brady, Jeff Davis, Colin Mochrie, Greg Proops	Nolan Gould	April 25, 2014	205	1.69
239	8	Wayne Brady, Gary Anthony Williams, Colin Mochrie, Ryan Stiles	Mircea Monroe	May 2, 2014	207	1.25
240	9	Wayne Brady, Keegan-Michael Key, Colin Mochrie, Ryan Stiles	none	May 9, 2014	209	1.45
241	10	Wayne Brady, Nyima Funk, Colin Mochrie, Ryan Stiles	Jack Osbourne	May 16, 2014	208	1.78
242	11	Wayne Brady, Jonathan Mangum, Colin Mochrie, Ryan Stiles	Rob Gronkowski	June 2, 2014	211	1.66
243	12	Wayne Brady, Jeff Davis, Colin Mochrie, Ryan Stiles	Robbie Amell	June 9, 2014	218	1.88
244	13	Wayne Brady, Brad Sherwood, Colin Mochrie, Ryan Stiles	Misha Collins	June 16, 2014	212	1.73
245	14	Wayne Brady, Jeff Davis, Colin Mochrie, Ryan Stiles	Sheryl Underwood	June 23, 2014	219	1.62
246	15	Wayne Brady, Gary Anthony Williams, Colin Mochrie, Ryan Stiles	Mel B.	July 14, 2014	214	1.52
247	16	Wayne Brady, Brad Sherwood, Colin Mochrie, Ryan Stiles	Kunal Nayyar	July 21, 2014	220	1.79
248	17	Wayne Brady, Jeff Davis, Colin Mochrie, Ryan Stiles	none	August 4, 2014	222	1.73
249	18	Wayne Brady, Heather Anne Campbell, Colin Mochrie, Ryan Stiles	Padma Lakshmi	August 11, 2014	216	1.87
250	19	Wayne Brady, Jeff Davis, Colin Mochrie, Ryan Stiles	none	August 18, 2014	224	1.68
251	20	Wayne Brady, Gary Anthony Williams, Colin Mochrie, Ryan Stiles	Matt Barnes	October 3, 2014	213	1.30
252	21	Wayne Brady, Gary Anthony Williams, Colin Mochrie, Ryan Stiles	none	October 10, 2014	221	1.51
253	22	Wayne Brady, Heather Anne Campbell, Colin Mochrie, Ryan Stiles	Brian Shaw	November 7, 2014	217	1.42
254	23	Wayne Brady, Jonathan Mangum, Colin Mochrie, Ryan Stiles	Wendi McLendon-Covey	November 14, 2014	215	1.66
255	24	Wayne Brady, Heather Anne Campbell, Colin Mochrie, Ryan Stiles	none	November 21, 2014	223	1.68

=== Season 11 (2015) ===
No. overall	No. in season	Performers	Special guest	Original release date	Prod. code	U.S. viewers (millions)
256	1	Wayne Brady, Gary Anthony Williams, Colin Mochrie, Ryan Stiles	Cedric the Entertainer	April 17, 2015	302	1.07
257	2	Wayne Brady, Jeff Davis, Colin Mochrie, Ryan Stiles	Adelaide Kane	April 24, 2015	306	0.78
258	3	Wayne Brady, Keegan-Michael Key, Colin Mochrie, Ryan Stiles	none	May 1, 2015	304	0.72
259	4	Wayne Brady, Jeff Davis, Colin Mochrie, Ryan Stiles	Jaime Camil	May 8, 2015	308	1.38
260	5	Wayne Brady, Greg Proops, Colin Mochrie, Ryan Stiles	Scott Porter	May 15, 2015	307	1.17
261	6	Wayne Brady, Jeff Davis, Colin Mochrie, Ryan Stiles	Willie Robertson	May 29, 2015	309	1.41
262	7	Wayne Brady, Brad Sherwood, Colin Mochrie, Ryan Stiles	Heather Morris	June 5, 2015	314	1.56
263	8	Wayne Brady, Keegan-Michael Key, Colin Mochrie, Ryan Stiles	Vernon Davis	June 12, 2015	303	1.49
264	9	Wayne Brady, Jeff Davis, Colin Mochrie, Ryan Stiles	none	June 19, 2015	312	1.30
265	10	Wayne Brady, Gary Anthony Williams, Colin Mochrie, Ryan Stiles	Penn & Teller	July 6, 2015	301	1.27
266	11	Wayne Brady, Brad Sherwood, Colin Mochrie, Ryan Stiles	Kathie Lee Gifford	July 13, 2015	313	1.57
267	12	Wayne Brady, Jonathan Mangum, Colin Mochrie, Ryan Stiles	Randy Couture	July 20, 2015	315	1.40
268	13	Wayne Brady, Jeff Davis, Colin Mochrie, Ryan Stiles	Gina Rodriguez	August 3, 2015	321	1.39
269	14	Wayne Brady, Gary Anthony Williams, Colin Mochrie, Ryan Stiles	none	August 10, 2015	325	1.79
270	15	Wayne Brady, Heather Anne Campbell, Colin Mochrie, Ryan Stiles	Nina Agdal	August 17, 2015	317	1.46
271	16	Wayne Brady, Brad Sherwood, Colin Mochrie, Ryan Stiles	none	August 24, 2015	327	1.43
272	17	Wayne Brady, Greg Proops, Colin Mochrie, Ryan Stiles	Bill Nye	August 31, 2015	310	1.74
273	18	Wayne Brady, Keegan-Michael Key, Colin Mochrie, Ryan Stiles	none	September 14, 2015	322	1.06
274	19	Wayne Brady, Heather Anne Campbell; Colin Mochrie, Ryan Stiles	Carson Kressley	September 28, 2015	318	1.25
275	20	Wayne Brady, Jeff Davis, Colin Mochrie, Ryan Stiles	none	October 5, 2015	323	1.22

=== Season 12 (2016) ===
No. overall	No. in season	Performers	Special guest	Original release date	Prod. code	U.S. viewers (millions)
276	1	Wayne Brady, Gary Anthony Williams, Colin Mochrie, Ryan Stiles	Alfonso Ribeiro	May 23, 2016	319	1.29
277	2	Wayne Brady, Keegan-Michael Key, Colin Mochrie, Ryan Stiles	none	May 23, 2016	311	1.47
278	3	Wayne Brady, Jeff Davis, Colin Mochrie, Ryan Stiles	Karla Souza	June 6, 2016	324	1.25
279	4	Wayne Brady, Gary Anthony Williams, Colin Mochrie, Ryan Stiles	Yvette Nicole Brown	June 13, 2016	320	0.98
280	5	Wayne Brady, Jonathan Mangum, Colin Mochrie, Ryan Stiles	Kaitlin Doubleday	June 20, 2016	316	1.05
281	6	Wayne Brady, Jeff Davis, Colin Mochrie, Ryan Stiles	Lolo Jones	July 13, 2016	305	1.23
282	7	Wayne Brady, Jonathan Mangum, Colin Mochrie, Ryan Stiles	none	July 20, 2016	326	1.12
283	8	Wayne Brady, Jeff Davis, Colin Mochrie, Ryan Stiles	Joey Fatone	July 26, 2016	408	1.05
284	9	Wayne Brady, Greg Proops, Colin Mochrie, Ryan Stiles	Tamera Mowry	July 26, 2016	413	1.06
285	10	Wayne Brady, Jeff Davis, Colin Mochrie, Ryan Stiles	none	July 27, 2016	328	1.30
286	11	Brad Sherwood, Jeff Davis, Colin Mochrie, Ryan Stiles	Misty May-Treanor	August 2, 2016	404	1.12
287	12	Wayne Brady, Brad Sherwood, Colin Mochrie, Ryan Stiles	Lyndie Greenwood	August 2, 2016	405	1.12
288	13	Wayne Brady, Gary Anthony Williams, Colin Mochrie, Ryan Stiles	Chris Jericho	August 3, 2016	402	1.31
289	14	Wayne Brady, Jeff Davis, Colin Mochrie, Ryan Stiles	Rachel Bloom	August 10, 2016	419	1.13
290	15	Wayne Brady, Jonathan Mangum, Colin Mochrie, Ryan Stiles	Lea Thompson	August 24, 2016	410	1.28
291	16	Wayne Brady, Brad Sherwood, Colin Mochrie, Ryan Stiles	Katie Cassidy	August 31, 2016	403	1.34
292	17	Wayne Brady, Jonathan Mangum, Colin Mochrie, Ryan Stiles	Brett Dier	September 7, 2016	409	1.31
293	18	Wayne Brady, Gary Anthony Williams, Colin Mochrie, Ryan Stiles	Emily Bett Rickards	September 14, 2016	416	1.11
294	19	Wayne Brady, Jonathan Mangum, Colin Mochrie, Ryan Stiles	none	September 21, 2016	412	1.13
295	20	Brad Sherwood, Jeff Davis, Colin Mochrie, Ryan Stiles	Cheryl Hines	September 28, 2016	406	1.17

=== Season 13 (2017) ===
No. overall	No. in season	Performers	Special guest	Original release date	Prod. code	U.S. viewers (millions)
296	1	Wayne Brady, Heather Anne Campbell, Colin Mochrie, Ryan Stiles	Tony Hawk	May 29, 2017	418	0.94
297	2	Wayne Brady, Jeff Davis, Colin Mochrie, Ryan Stiles	The Bella Twins	June 5, 2017	420	1.09
298	3	Wayne Brady, Jeff Davis, Colin Mochrie, Ryan Stiles	Candice Patton	June 12, 2017	407	0.95
299	4	Wayne Brady, Gary Anthony Williams, Colin Mochrie, Ryan Stiles	Malcolm Goodwin	June 19, 2017	415	1.00
300	5	Wayne Brady, Gary Anthony Williams, Colin Mochrie, Ryan Stiles	Wil Wheaton	July 10, 2017	401	1.07
301	6	Wayne Brady, Jonathan Mangum, Colin Mochrie, Ryan Stiles	Kearran Giovanni	July 17, 2017	422	0.94
302	7	Wayne Brady, Brad Sherwood, Colin Mochrie, Ryan Stiles	none	July 24, 2017	411	1.01
303	8	Wayne Brady, Jonathan Mangum, Colin Mochrie, Ryan Stiles	Ralph Macchio	August 3, 2017	421	1.33
304	9	Wayne Brady, Greg Proops, Colin Mochrie, Ryan Stiles	Tony Cavalero	August 10, 2017	414	1.27
305	10	Wayne Brady, Heather Anne Campbell, Colin Mochrie, Ryan Stiles	Jillian Michaels	August 17, 2017	417	1.28
306	11	Wayne Brady, Jeff Davis, Colin Mochrie, Ryan Stiles	Chip Esten	August 24, 2017	502	1.22
307	12	Wayne Brady, Jonathan Mangum, Colin Mochrie, Ryan Stiles	Wanya Morris	September 7, 2017	511	1.21
308	13	Wayne Brady, Gary Anthony Williams, Colin Mochrie, Ryan Stiles	Danielle Panabaker	September 14, 2017	504	1.21
309	14	Wayne Brady, Jonathan Mangum, Colin Mochrie, Ryan Stiles	Marisol Nichols	September 21, 2017	510	1.19
310	15	Wayne Brady, Brad Sherwood, Colin Mochrie, Ryan Stiles	Grace Byers	September 28, 2017	509	0.99

=== Season 14 (2018) ===
No. overall	No. in season	Performers	Special guest	Original release date	Prod. code	U.S. viewers (millions)
311	1	Wayne Brady, Greg Proops, Colin Mochrie, Ryan Stiles	Ross Mathews	June 4, 2018	506	1.11
312	2	Wayne Brady, Jeff Davis, Colin Mochrie, Ryan Stiles	none	June 4, 2018	612	1.25
313	3	Wayne Brady, Gary Anthony Williams, Colin Mochrie, Ryan Stiles	Andrea Navedo	June 11, 2018	505	0.98
314	4	Wayne Brady, Jonathan Mangum, Colin Mochrie, Ryan Stiles	none	June 18, 2018	606	0.92
315	5	Wayne Brady, Jeff Davis, Colin Mochrie, Ryan Stiles	Chip Esten	June 25, 2018	503	1.11
316	6	Wayne Brady, Greg Proops, Colin Mochrie, Ryan Stiles	none	July 2, 2018	602	1.09
317	7	Wayne Brady, Jonathan Mangum, Colin Mochrie, Ryan Stiles	none	July 9, 2018	611	1.11
318	8	Wayne Brady, Keegan-Michael Key, Colin Mochrie, Ryan Stiles	none	July 16, 2018	609	1.05
319	9	Wayne Brady, Heather Anne Campbell, Colin Mochrie, Ryan Stiles	none	July 23, 2018	610	1.24
320	10	Wayne Brady, Gary Anthony Williams, Colin Mochrie, Ryan Stiles	none	July 30, 2018	512	1.05
321	11	Wayne Brady, Jeff Davis, Colin Mochrie, Ryan Stiles	none	August 6, 2018	608	0.89
322	12	Wayne Brady, Brad Sherwood, Colin Mochrie, Ryan Stiles	Carmen Electra	August 13, 2018	508	1.19
323	13	Wayne Brady, Jeff Davis, Colin Mochrie, Ryan Stiles	none	August 20, 2018	601	1.04
324	14	Wayne Brady, Greg Proops, Colin Mochrie, Ryan Stiles	none	August 27, 2018	603	1.28
325	15	Wayne Brady, Jeff Davis, Colin Mochrie, Ryan Stiles	Cornelius Smith Jr.	September 3, 2018	501	1.02
326	16	Wayne Brady, Gary Anthony Williams , Colin Mochrie, Ryan Stiles	none	September 24, 2018	604	0.73
327	17	Wayne Brady, Greg Proops, Colin Mochrie, Ryan Stiles	Lance Bass	October 1, 2018	507	0.73

=== Season 15 (2019) ===
No. overall	No. in season	Performers	Special guest	Original release date	Prod. code	U.S. viewers (millions)
328	1	Wayne Brady, Greg Proops, Colin Mochrie, Ryan Stiles	Chris Hardwick	June 17, 2019	713	1.05
329	2	Wayne Brady, Jeff Davis, Colin Mochrie, Ryan Stiles	Tinashe	June 24, 2019	709	0.90
330	3	Wayne Brady, Jonathan Mangum, Colin Mochrie, Ryan Stiles	none	July 1, 2019	720	0.87
331	4	Wayne Brady, Chip Esten, Colin Mochrie, Ryan Stiles	Elizabeth Gillies	July 8, 2019	715	0.93
332	5	Wayne Brady, Brad Sherwood, Colin Mochrie, Ryan Stiles	none	July 15, 2019	708	0.91
333	6	Wayne Brady, Gary Anthony Williams, Colin Mochrie, Ryan Stiles	Adam Rippon	July 22, 2019	712	0.85
334	7	Wayne Brady, Heather Anne Campbell, Colin Mochrie, Ryan Stiles	none	July 29, 2019	605	0.94
335	8	Wayne Brady, Jonathan Mangum, Colin Mochrie, Ryan Stiles	Chris Jackson	August 5, 2019	717	0.94
336	9	Wayne Brady, Jeff Davis, Colin Mochrie, Ryan Stiles	none	August 19, 2019	701	0.94
337	10	Wayne Brady, Greg Proops, Colin Mochrie, Ryan Stiles	Adrienne Houghton	August 26, 2019	714	0.80
338	11	Wayne Brady, Brad Sherwood, Colin Mochrie, Ryan Stiles	none	September 9, 2019	607	0.93
339	12	Wayne Brady, Jonathan Mangum, Colin Mochrie, Ryan Stiles	none	September 23, 2019	703	0.67

=== Season 16 (2020) ===
No. overall	No. in season	Performers	Special guest	Original release date	Prod. code	U.S. viewers (millions)
340	1	Wayne Brady, Jeff Davis, Colin Mochrie, Ryan Stiles	Amber Riley	March 30, 2020	710	0.87
341	2	Wayne Brady, Gary Anthony Williams, Colin Mochrie, Ryan Stiles	Jeanine Mason	April 6, 2020	711	0.93
342	3	Wayne Brady, Greg Proops, Colin Mochrie, Ryan Stiles	none	April 13, 2020	807	0.91
343	4	Wayne Brady, Chip Esten, Colin Mochrie, Ryan Stiles	none	April 20, 2020	803	0.99
344	5	Wayne Brady, Jonathan Mangum; Colin Mochrie, Ryan Stiles	Chris Lee	April 27, 2020	718	1.02
345	6	Wayne Brady, Jeff Davis, Colin Mochrie, Ryan Stiles	Candice Patton	May 4, 2020	705	0.89
346	7	Wayne Brady, Gary Anthony Williams, Colin Mochrie, Ryan Stiles	Cedric the Entertainer	May 11, 2020	707	1.05
347	8	Wayne Brady, Jonathan Mangum, Colin Mochrie, Ryan Stiles	none	June 22, 2020	704	1.07
348	9	Wayne Brady, Greg Proops, Colin Mochrie, Ryan Stiles	none	June 29, 2020	719	1.04
349	10	Wayne Brady, Chip Esten, Colin Mochrie, Ryan Stiles	Ricki Lake	July 6, 2020	716	1.05
350	11	Wayne Brady, Gary Anthony Williams, Colin Mochrie, Ryan Stiles	none	July 13, 2020	706	0.92
351	12	Wayne Brady, Gary Anthony Williams, Colin Mochrie, Ryan Stiles	none	July 20, 2020	801	0.93
352	13	Wayne Brady, Greg Proops, Colin Mochrie, Ryan Stiles	none	July 27, 2020	802	0.96
353	14	Wayne Brady, Gary Anthony Williams, Colin Mochrie, Ryan Stiles	Adam Rippon	August 24, 2020	804	1.00
354	15	Wayne Brady, Brad Sherwood, Colin Mochrie, Ryan Stiles	none	August 31, 2020	702	0.89
355	16	Wayne Brady, Jeff Davis, Colin Mochrie, Ryan Stiles	none	October 5, 2020	805	0.79
356	17	Wayne Brady, Jeff Davis, Colin Mochrie, Ryan Stiles	none	October 12, 2020	808	0.92
357	18	Wayne Brady, Chip Esten, Colin Mochrie, Ryan Stiles	none	October 19, 2020	809	0.83
358	19	Wayne Brady, Jeff Davis, Colin Mochrie, Ryan Stiles	none	October 26, 2020	810	1.05
359	20	Wayne Brady, Jonathan Mangum, Colin Mochrie, Ryan Stiles	none	November 16, 2020	806	0.90

=== Season 17 (2021) ===
No. overall	No. in season	Performers	Original release date	Prod. code	U.S. viewers (millions)
360	1	Wayne Brady, Jeff Davis, Colin Mochrie, Ryan Stiles	January 8, 2021	901	0.83
361	2	Wayne Brady, Gary Anthony Williams, Colin Mochrie, Ryan Stiles	January 15, 2021	906	0.85
362	3	Wayne Brady, Jonathan Mangum, Colin Mochrie, Ryan Stiles	January 22, 2021	903	0.92
363	4	Wayne Brady, Greg Proops, Colin Mochrie, Ryan Stiles	January 29, 2021	907	1.08
364	5	Wayne Brady, Nyima Funk, Colin Mochrie, Ryan Stiles	February 5, 2021	905	0.92
365	6	Wayne Brady, Greg Proops, Colin Mochrie, Ryan Stiles	February 19, 2021	902	0.81
366	7	Wayne Brady, Heather Anne Campbell, Colin Mochrie, Ryan Stiles	February 26, 2021	904	0.87
367	8	Wayne Brady, Jonathan Mangum, Colin Mochrie, Ryan Stiles	March 12, 2021	908	0.81
368	9	Wayne Brady, Jeff Davis, Colin Mochrie, Ryan Stiles	March 19, 2021	909	0.75
369	10	Wayne Brady, Gary Anthony Williams, Colin Mochrie, Ryan Stiles	April 16, 2021	910	0.75

=== Season 18 (2021–22) ===
No. overall	No. in season	Performers	Special guest	Original release date	Prod. code	U.S. viewers (millions)
370	1	Wayne Brady, Heather Anne Campbell, Colin Mochrie, Ryan Stiles	Kevin McHale	October 9, 2021	1001	0.61
371	2	Wayne Brady, Jeff Davis, Colin Mochrie, Ryan Stiles	Laila Ali	October 9, 2021	1002	0.63
372	3	Wayne Brady, Keegan-Michael Key, Colin Mochrie, Ryan Stiles	none	October 16, 2021	1003	0.61
373	4	Wayne Brady, Heather Anne Campbell, Colin Mochrie, Ryan Stiles	none	October 23, 2021	1004	0.42
374	5	Wayne Brady, Nyima Funk, Colin Mochrie, Ryan Stiles	Shawn Johnson	November 6, 2021	1006	0.60
375	6	Wayne Brady, Greg Proops, Colin Mochrie, Ryan Stiles	none	November 13, 2021	1010	0.65
376	7	Wayne Brady, Keegan-Michael Key, Colin Mochrie, Ryan Stiles	none	November 20, 2021	1007	0.60
377	8	Wayne Brady, Jonathan Mangum, Colin Mochrie, Ryan Stiles	none	January 8, 2022	1009	0.67
378	9	Wayne Brady, Jeff Davis, Colin Mochrie, Ryan Stiles	none	January 15, 2022	1005	0.48
379	10	Wayne Brady, Jonathan Mangum, Colin Mochrie, Ryan Stiles	Kyle Richards	April 9, 2022	1008	0.57

=== Season 19 (2022–23) ===
No. overall	No. in season	Performers	Special guest	Original release date	Prod. code	U.S. viewers (millions)
380	1	Wayne Brady, Jonathan Mangum, Colin Mochrie, Ryan Stiles	none	October 14, 2022	1111	0.45
381	2	Wayne Brady, Heather Anne Campbell, Colin Mochrie, Ryan Stiles	Padma Lakshmi	October 21, 2022	1101	0.60
382	3	Wayne Brady, Jeff Davis, Colin Mochrie, Greg Proops	Darren Criss	October 28, 2022	1108	0.47
383	4	Wayne Brady, Gary Anthony Williams, Colin Mochrie, Ryan Stiles	none	November 4, 2022	1103	0.61
384	5	Wayne Brady, Jeff Davis, Colin Mochrie, Ryan Stiles	none	November 11, 2022	1105	0.50
385	6	Wayne Brady, Gary Anthony Williams, Colin Mochrie, Ryan Stiles	none	November 18, 2022	1110	0.51
386	7	Wayne Brady, Brad Sherwood, Colin Mochrie, Ryan Stiles	none	December 3, 2022	1102	0.50
387	8	Wayne Brady, Gary Anthony Williams, Colin Mochrie, Ryan Stiles	none	December 9, 2022	1112	0.54
388	9	Wayne Brady, Gary Anthony Williams, Colin Mochrie, Ryan Stiles	none	February 17, 2023	1107	0.58
389	10	Brad Sherwood, Jeff Davis, Colin Mochrie, Ryan Stiles	none	February 24, 2023	1113	0.55
390	11	Wayne Brady, Nyima Funk, Colin Mochrie, Ryan Stiles	Maggie Q	March 3, 2023	1106	0.50
391	12	Wayne Brady, Gary Anthony Williams, Colin Mochrie, Ryan Stiles	none	March 10, 2023	1114	0.50
392	13	Wayne Brady, Jonathan Mangum, Colin Mochrie, Ryan Stiles	Kearran Giovanni	March 17, 2023	1104	0.55
393	14	Wayne Brady, Greg Proops, Colin Mochrie, Ryan Stiles	none	March 24, 2023	1109	0.45

=== Season 20 (2023–24) ===
No. overall	No. in season	Performers	Special guest	Original release date	Prod. code	U.S. viewers (millions)
394	1	Wayne Brady, Jeff Davis, Keegan-Michael Key, Colin Mochrie, Ryan Stiles	Candice Accola	March 31, 2023	1209	0.48
395	2	Wayne Brady, Brad Sherwood, Jonathan Mangum, Gary Anthony Williams, Colin Mochrie, Ryan Stiles	Marisol Nichols	April 7, 2023	1208	0.43
396	3	Wayne Brady, Gary Anthony Williams, Colin Mochrie, Ryan Stiles	Penn & Teller	April 14, 2023	1201	0.55
397	4	Wayne Brady, Keegan-Michael Key, Colin Mochrie, Ryan Stiles	none	April 21, 2023	1203	0.52
398	5	Wayne Brady, Gary Anthony Williams, Jeff Davis, Colin Mochrie, Ryan Stiles	Danielle Panabaker	April 28, 2023	1207	0.44
399	6	Wayne Brady, Jeff Davis, Colin Mochrie, Ryan Stiles	Rachel Bloom	May 5, 2023	1204	0.44
400	7	Wayne Brady, Nyima Funk, Colin Mochrie, Ryan Stiles	Jack Osbourne	May 12, 2023	1202	0.36
401	8	Wayne Brady, Gary Anthony Williams, Jeff Davis, Jonathan Mangum, Colin Mochrie, Ryan Stiles	none	May 19, 2023	1210	0.47
402	9	Wayne Brady, Gary Anthony Williams, Colin Mochrie, Ryan Stiles	Mircea Monroe	June 2, 2023	1205	0.50
403	10	Wayne Brady, Greg Proops, Colin Mochrie, Ryan Stiles	Kat Graham	June 9, 2023	1206	0.43
404	11	Wayne Brady, Jonathan Mangum, Colin Mochrie, Ryan Stiles	Tiffany Haddish	November 14, 2023	1221	0.46
405	12	Wayne Brady, Jonathan Mangum, Colin Mochrie, Ryan Stiles	Tiffany Coyne	November 14, 2023	1220	0.48
406	13	Wayne Brady, Greg Proops, Colin Mochrie, Ryan Stiles	Jordin Sparks	November 21, 2023	1214	0.48
407	14	Wayne Brady, Jeff Davis, Colin Mochrie, Ryan Stiles	Maile Brady	November 28, 2023	1212	0.32
408	15	Wayne Brady, Jeff Davis, Colin Mochrie, Ryan Stiles	none	December 5, 2023	1213	0.30
409	16	Wayne Brady, Gary Anthony Williams, Colin Mochrie, Ryan Stiles	Alyson Hannigan	December 12, 2023	1217	0.42
410	17	Wayne Brady, Greg Proops, Colin Mochrie, Ryan Stiles	none	December 19, 2023	1216	0.32
411	18	Wayne Brady, Gary Anthony Williams, Colin Mochrie, Ryan Stiles	Mark Ballas	January 9, 2024	1218	0.40
412	19	Wayne Brady, Gary Anthony Williams, Colin Mochrie, Ryan Stiles	none	January 16, 2024	1219	0.31
413	20	Wayne Brady, Greg Proops, Colin Mochrie, Ryan Stiles	Chris Lee	January 23, 2024	1215	0.42
414	21	Wayne Brady, Jonathan Mangum, Colin Mochrie, Ryan Stiles	Kaila Mullady	January 30, 2024	1222	0.52
415	22	Wayne Brady, Jeff Davis, Colin Mochrie, Ryan Stiles	none	February 6, 2024	1211A	0.47

=== Season 21 (2024) ===
No. overall	No. in season	Performers	Special guest(s)	Original release date	Prod. code	U.S. viewers (millions)
416	1	Wayne Brady, Greg Proops, Colin Mochrie, Ryan Stiles	Jordin Sparks	September 6, 2024	1304	0.43
417	2	Wayne Brady, Jonathan Mangum, Colin Mochrie, Ryan Stiles	Tiffany Haddish	September 6, 2024	1303	0.39
418	3	Wayne Brady, Gary Anthony Williams, Colin Mochrie, Ryan Stiles	Alyson Hannigan	September 13, 2024	1313	0.43
419	4	Wayne Brady, Gary Anthony Williams, Colin Mochrie, Ryan Stiles	Mark Ballas	September 13, 2024	1301	0.39
420	5	Wayne Brady, Jonathan Mangum, Colin Mochrie, Ryan Stiles	Chris Jackson	September 27, 2024	1305	0.46
421	6	Wayne Brady, Greg Proops, Colin Mochrie, Ryan Stiles	none	September 27, 2024	1307	0.51
422	7	Wayne Brady, Jonathan Mangum, Colin Mochrie, Ryan Stiles	Kaila Mullady	October 4, 2024	1315	0.45
423	8	Brad Sherwood, Jeff Davis, Colin Mochrie, Ryan Stiles	Misty May-Treanor	October 4, 2024	1316	0.41
424	9	Wayne Brady, Heather Anne Campbell, Colin Mochrie, Ryan Stiles	none	October 11, 2024	1311	0.53
425	10	Wayne Brady, Greg Proops, Colin Mochrie, Ryan Stiles	Chris Lee	October 11, 2024	1306	0.54
426	11	Wayne Brady, Brad Sherwood, Colin Mochrie, Ryan Stiles	none	October 18, 2024	1310	0.39
427	12	Wayne Brady, Jonathan Mangum, Colin Mochrie, Ryan Stiles	Tiffany Coyne	October 18, 2024	1302	0.42
428	13	Wayne Brady, Gary Anthony Williams, Colin Mochrie, Ryan Stiles	Lauren Cohan	October 25, 2024	1312	0.31
429	14	Wayne Brady, Jeff Davis, Colin Mochrie, Ryan Stiles	none	October 25, 2024	1314	0.35
430	15	Wayne Brady, Brad Sherwood, Colin Mochrie, Ryan Stiles	Grace Byers	November 1, 2024	1308	0.47
431	16	Wayne Brady, Greg Proops, Colin Mochrie, Ryan Stiles	none	November 1, 2024	1309	0.45

== See also ==
- Whose Line Is It Anyway? (British TV series)
  - List of Whose Line Is It Anyway? (British TV series) episodes
