= List of beatboxers =

This is a list of notable beatboxers.

== Groups ==
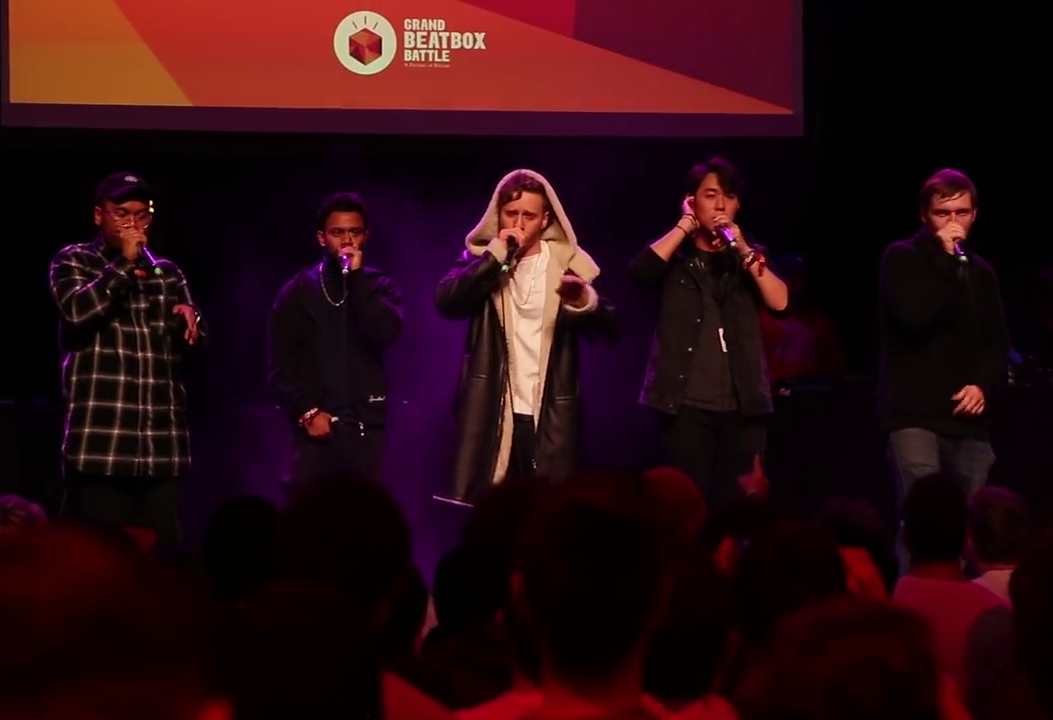
Beatbox House

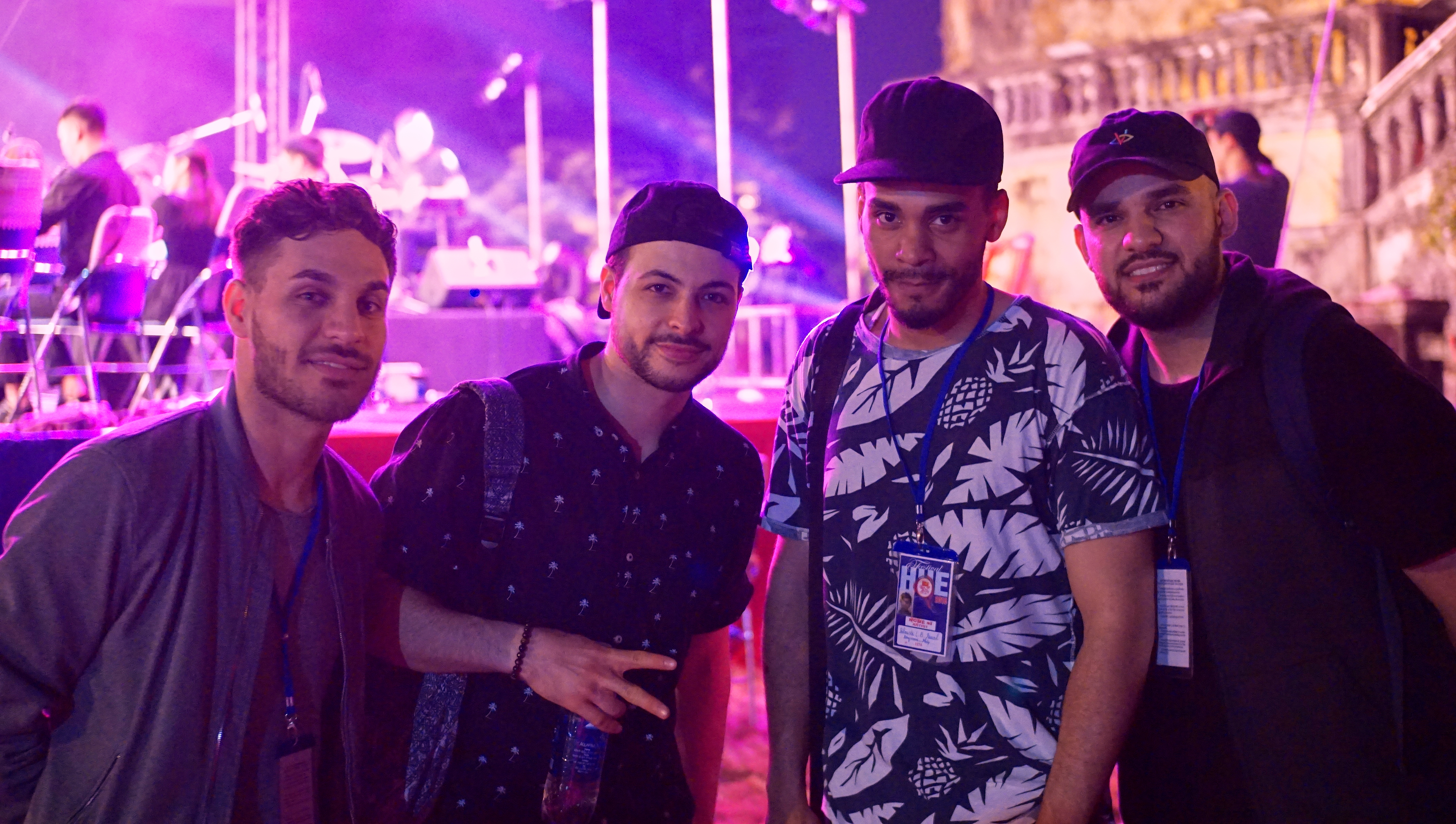
Berywam

- Bauchklang
- Beatbox House
- Home Free
- Pentatonix
- Soul Inscribed
- The House Jacks
- Berywam

== All solo beatboxers ==
=== North America ===
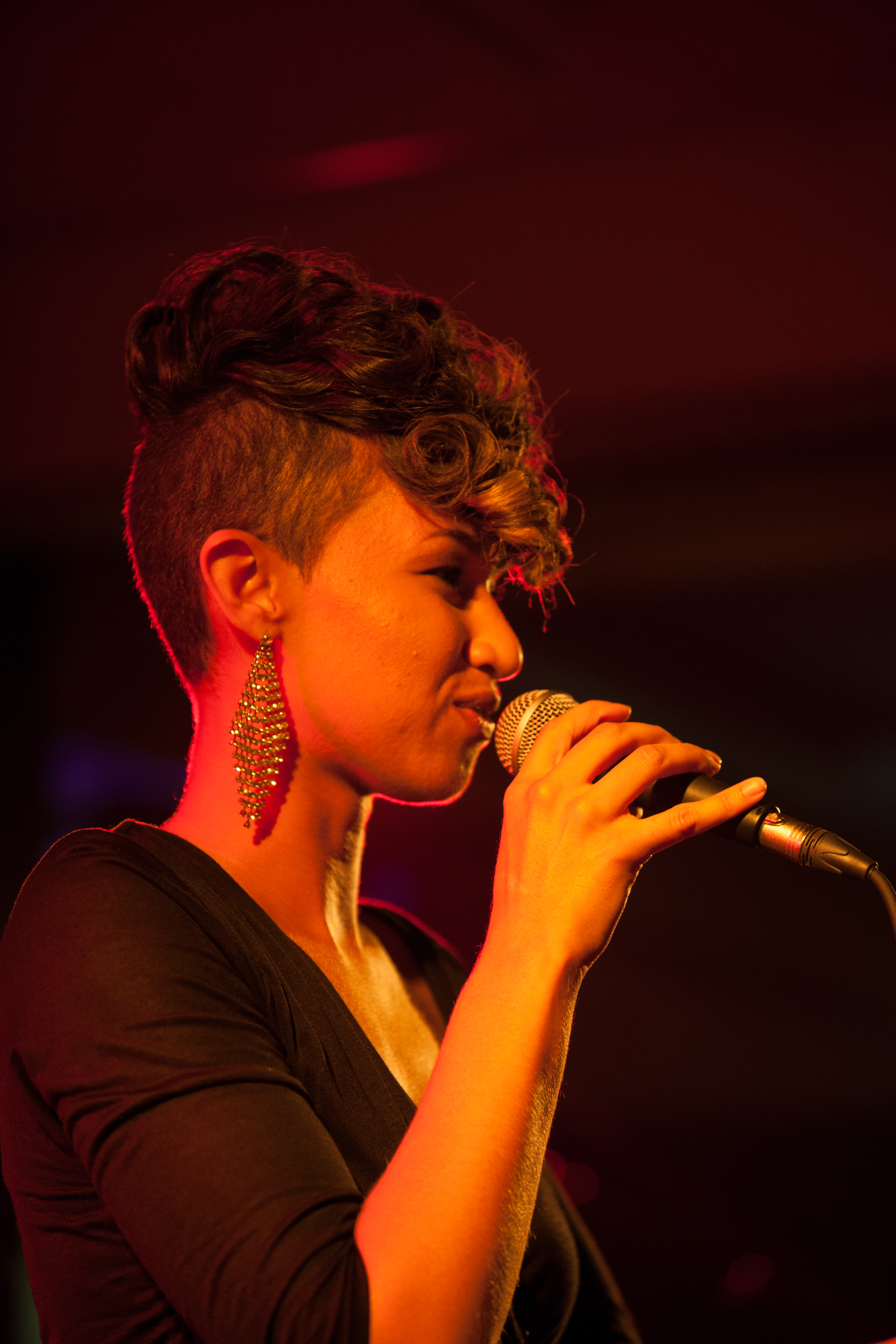
Butterscotch

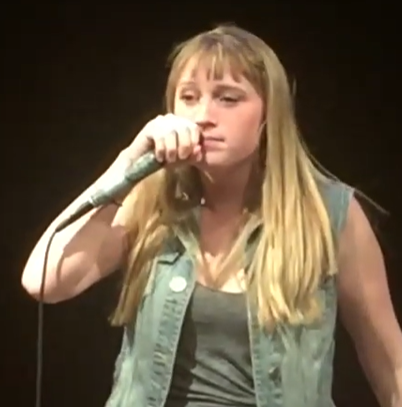
Kaila Mullady

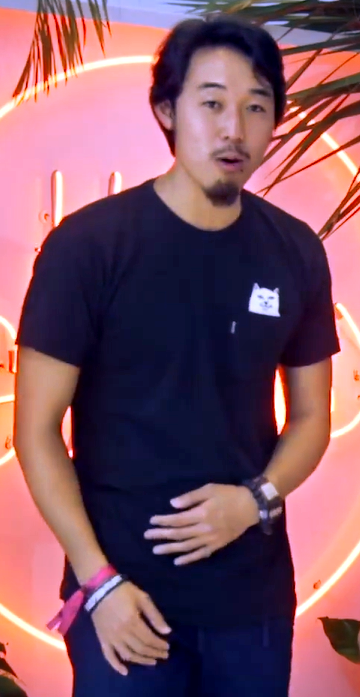
Gene Shinozaki

- Ariel Pink
- Biz Markie
- Butterscotch
- Buffy
- Doug E. Fresh
- D-Nice
- Gene Shinozaki
- Jeff Thacher
- Kaila Mullady
- Kevin Olusola
- Kid Lucky
- KRNFX
- Matisyahu
- Michael Winslow
- Mike Tompkins
- Rahzel
- Ready Rock C
- Reggie Watts
- SungBeats
- Timbaland
- Wise
- Wes Carroll

=== South America ===
- André Pinguim

=== Europe ===
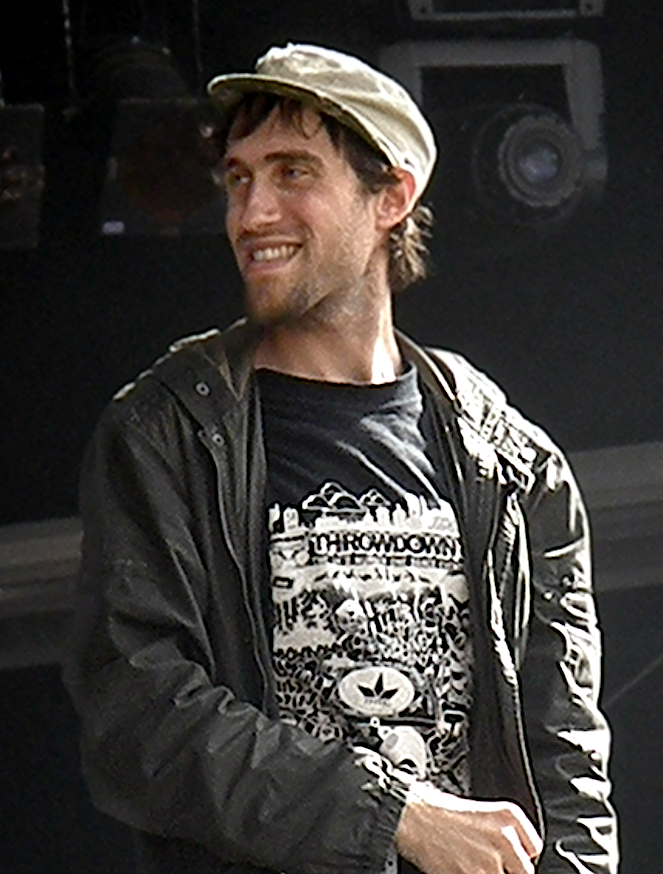
Beardyman

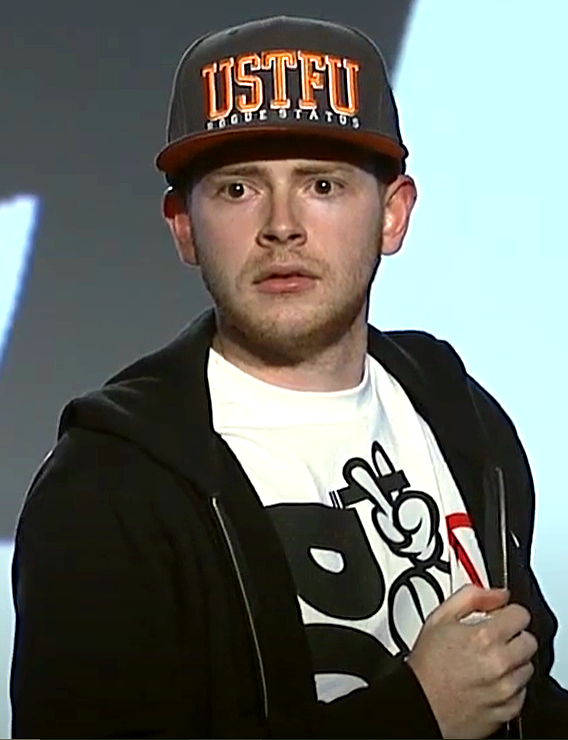
Reeps One

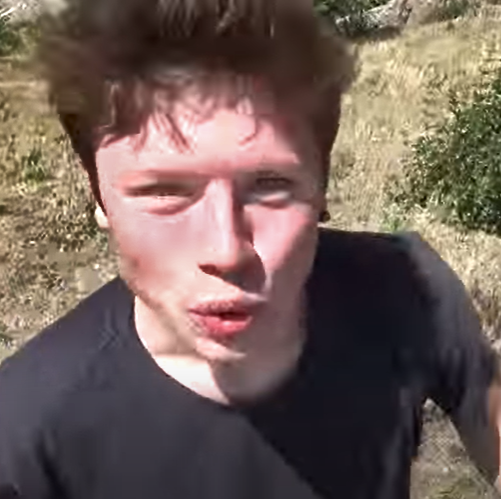
D-Low

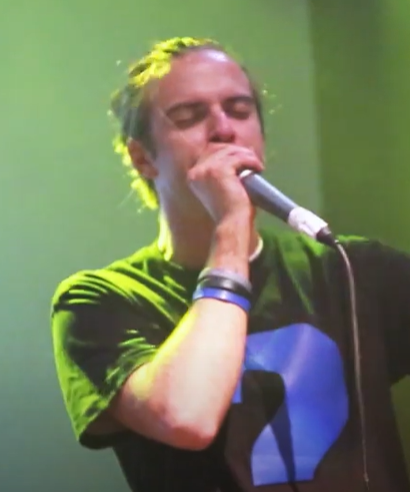
SkilleR

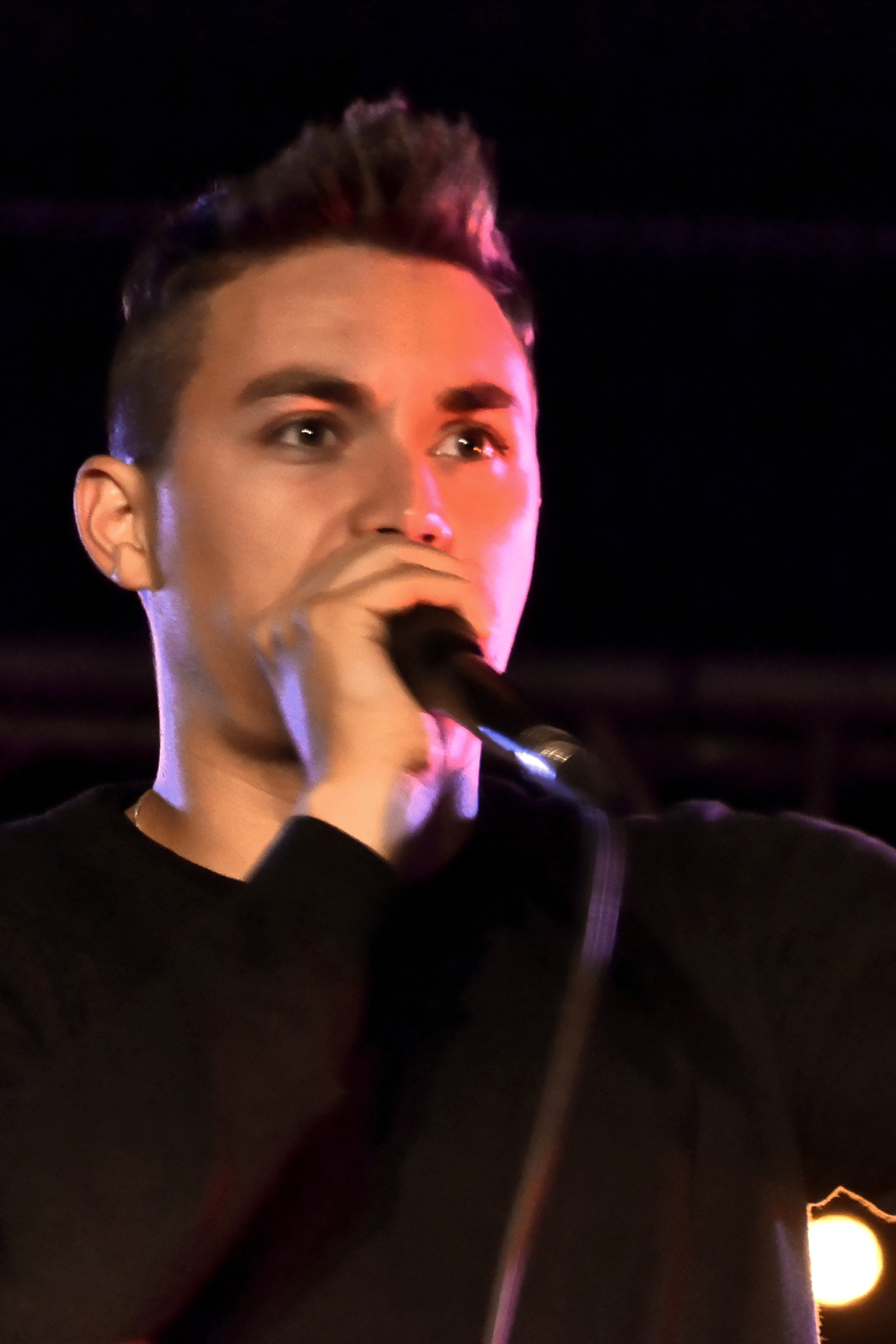
Alem

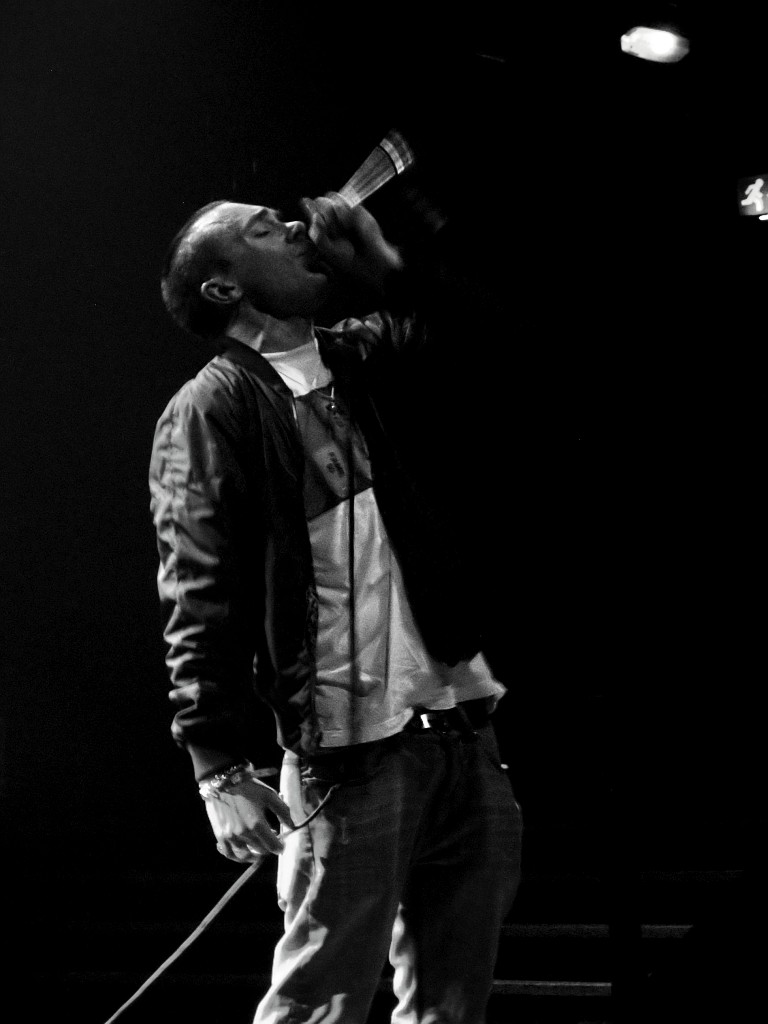
Killa Kela

- Alem
- Beardyman
- D-Low / DJ-Low
- Jay Sean
- Juls
- Killa Kela
- K. I. M.
- MB14
- Reeps One
- RoxorLoops
- Shlomo
- SkilleR
- Timmeh
- Tobias Hug

=== Asia ===
- Afra
- Bigman
- Hikakin
- Hiss
- Jack Beats
- Jairo
- Mr.T
- SO-SO
- Vineeth Vincent
- Yuichi Nakamaru
- WING

=== Oceania ===
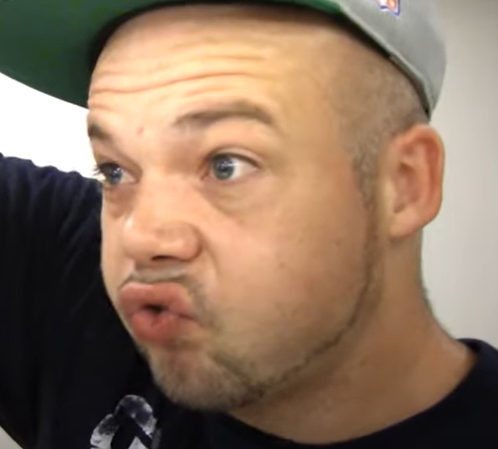
Joel Turner

- Dub FX
- Joel Turner
- Tom Thum

=== Africa ===
- Thierry Olemba

== See also ==
- List of hip-hop musicians
- Lists of musicians
