= Beatrhyming =

Beatrhyming is a vocal performance art which involves rapping, singing, or spoken word while simultaneously beatboxing. Beatrhyming is an artform that was popularized by Kid Lucky.

== Technique ==
The primary technique of beatrhyming is singing or speaking rhyming lyrics while concurrently imitating drum beats with the voice and lips. It can also involve techniques such as vocal scratching the spoken or sung lyrics, making vocal sound effects relevant to the lyrics, and instrument mimicry. It can be improvised, pre-written, or covering a popular song.

== Early history ==
Kid Lucky began developing the concept for beatrhyming in the early 2000s. He credits Biz Markie's hit song "A one two" as the earliest known example of what he defines as beatrhyming. The techniques of beatrhyming were already being practiced by artists such as Rahzel, D-Cross, and Masai Electro.

== Modern popularity ==
Beatrhyming has risen to fame in the new school beatbox scene through artists such as Kaila Mullady, Mark Martin and Gene Shinozaki of beatbox house, as well as New Zealand born beatbox legend King Homeboy. In 2013 Kid Lucky Started the beatrhyme championships as part of the american human beatbox festival of which Kaila Mullady is the 3 time champion. Baba Israel and Duv of the band Soul Inscribed are other well known practitioners of beatrhyming. Mullady and Kid Lucky are well known for teaching this art in workshops for all ages.

== See also ==
- Beatbox House
