= Whose Line Is It Anyway? (American TV series) =

American improv TV series

- Genre: Comedy
- Created by: Dan Patterson; Mark Leveson
- Presented by: Drew Carey; Aisha Tyler
- Starring: Ryan Stiles; Colin Mochrie; Wayne Brady
- Country of origin: United States
- Original language: English
- No. of seasons: 21
- No. of episodes: 431 (list of episodes)

Production
- Running time: 22 minutes
- Production companies: Hat Trick Productions; Warner Bros. Television (seasons 1–8); Angst Productions (seasons 9–21); Warner Horizon Television (seasons 9–21)

Original release
- Network: ABC
- Release: August 5, 1998 – September 4, 2004
- Network: ABC Family
- Release: January 17, 2005 – December 15, 2007
- Network: The CW
- Release: July 16, 2013 – November 1, 2024

Related
- Whose Line Is It Anyway? (British TV series)

Whose Line Is It Anyway? (sometimes shortened to Whose Line? or WLIIA) is an American improvisational comedy television series. It is an adaptation of the British series of the same name. It originally aired on ABC from August 5, 1998, to September 4, 2004, and ABC Family from January 17, 2005, to December 15, 2007, hosted by Drew Carey. A revival of the show, hosted by Aisha Tyler, aired on The CW from July 16, 2013, to November 1, 2024.

Colin Mochrie and Ryan Stiles have been permanent performers on the show since Season 1 (though illness caused Stiles to miss two episodes of Season 10), while Wayne Brady, after appearing in several episodes of Season 1, has been a permanent performer since Season 2 (with the exception of a few episodes in Season 8). The remaining of the four seats is occupied by a guest panelist. Prior to the American series, Mochrie, Stiles, and Brady had all appeared on the British series, as did Greg Proops, Chip Esten, and Brad Sherwood, who are among the most frequent fourth performers on the American series.

In May 2024, the show was renewed for a twenty-first season, which premiered on September 6, 2024.

== Format ==
The show consists of a panel of four performers who create characters, scenes, and songs on the spot, in the style of short-form improvisation games. Topics for the games are based on either audience suggestions or predetermined prompts from the host, who would set up a game and situation that the performers would improvise. The original host, Drew Carey, awarded arbitrary point values after each game, often citing a humorous reason for his decision. The points were purely decorative and served no practical purpose. He would reiterate his point at the beginning of, and multiple times throughout, each episode by describing Whose Line as "the show where everything's made up and the points don't matter". The style of the games was varied (see Games, below). Some featured all four performers, while others featured fewer. Between games, the performers sat in four chairs facing the audience. The performers who were not involved in a game remained in their seats. Additionally, the show was marked by humorous banter among the performers and host.

At the conclusion of each episode, a winner or several winners were chosen arbitrarily by Carey. The "prize" was either to play a game with the host or to sit out while the other performers did so. After this game during the first season of the series, credits simply rolled under the show's theme. In the second season, the reading of the credits was performed by one or more cast members in a comedic fashion, based on a theme announced by Carey that often derived from a successful joke earlier in the show.

The show's "short-form" approach to improv received criticism from some improv actors. Performer Colin Mochrie has stated the show was never intended to be the "be-all and end-all" of improv; instead, the program was meant to introduce improv to the masses.

=== Performers/players ===
Each episode of Whose Line Is It Anyway? features four performers. Ryan Stiles and Colin Mochrie, both of whom had been major performers on the original UK series, have been permanent performers on the US series since its inception. Due to illness, Stiles missed two episodes of season 10 and one episode of season 19, meaning Mochrie is the only person to appear in every episode of the US show. Wayne Brady, who had first appeared in the last season of the UK series, appeared in several episodes of the first US season before joining Stiles and Mochrie as a permanent performer in every episode from season 2 onwards (a brief exception being season 8, where he appeared in 17 of the 21 episodes). During his tenure as host, Drew Carey also took part, though only in one game, after one of the performers was declared the "winner" and allowed to take his place at his desk in the studio; current host Aisha Tyler does not participate in games but occasionally joins in for quick scenes on different games (mostly Scenes from a Hat).

The fourth performer on the show alternates. As well as Stiles and Mochrie, other veterans of the UK series who regularly appear on the US series are Greg Proops, Brad Sherwood, and Chip Esten. Karen Maruyama, who appeared in three episodes of the UK series' last two seasons, appeared in three episodes of the US series' first two seasons. The US version also introduced several newcomers, including Denny Siegel, Kathy Greenwood, Jeff Davis, Patrick Bristow (who appeared in one episode of the last UK season), Stephen Colbert, Kathy Kinney, Ian Gomez, Gary Anthony Williams, Jonathan Mangum, Heather Anne Campbell, Keegan-Michael Key and Nyima Funk. Another of the UK series' major performers, Josie Lawrence, appeared in two episodes of the US series during season 2. Like the UK series, the US series occasionally featured a celebrity guest performer, such as Robin Williams, Kathy Griffin, and Whoopi Goldberg. On some occasions, in a feature that was unique to the US version, a celebrity made a guest appearance for individual games; such appearances have included Sid Caesar, David Hasselhoff, Florence Henderson, Jerry Springer, Joanie "Chyna" Laurer, Richard Simmons, Katie Harman, Jayne Trcka, the Loyola Marymount University cheerleaders, Hugh Hefner, and Lassie. Celebrity guests became a regular feature of the show beginning with season 9.

Improvisational musician Laura Hall, who replaced Richard Vranch as the in-house musician for the final UK season, has been part of the US series for its entire run and performed piano and keyboards in games featuring improvisational singing by the cast members. Hall, originally from Chicago, gained valuable experience for Whose Line? by performing as a pianist for various theater and improvisational companies, including The Second City and the Improv Institute. From the second season onward, other musicians joined Hall – Linda Taylor made frequent appearances playing guitar and occasionally keyboards, while Cece Worrall-Rubin, Anne King, Candy Girard, and Anna Wanselius appeared alongside Hall (and sometimes also Taylor) on occasion.

=== Games ===
The number and type of games played varied from episode to episode, yet while some games became more common over time, others faded from use. Some games are based on traditional improv games, with a considerable number brought over from the British original, including Scenes from a Hat, Greatest Hits, Props, Hoedown, Helping Hands, Questions Only, and Party Quirks. Others were new and uniquely created for both the American original format and the revived show, with several only being played once or twice, due either to the games not having been well received by audiences or to Stiles' reluctance to perform certain rounds. There are eight games that have been performed at least once in every season; these are Scenes from a Hat, Greatest Hits, Props, Let's Make a Date, Weird Newscasters, Duet, Helping Hands, and Questions Only.

All games are designed to test the performers' improvisational comedy skills, with some games requiring the host to ask the studio audience for suggestions for specific topics or situations, while other times these suggestions were written by the production staff or submitted by the audience in advance and chosen from among them. In addition, the host would control a buzzer that would signify the end of most games or the end of individual sections of rapid-fire games such as "Scenes from a Hat".

In addition to being tested on their comedy skills in improv games, the performers are also tested on other skills, such as singing, dancing, or impressions, as Whose Line features a number of musical games, with one or more of the show's resident musicians playing live backing music for them, except on a few occasions when pre-recorded music was also used. Although they had no bad feelings about these sorts of games, many of the performers disliked them. While Wayne Brady turned out to be well suited to them, having Chip Esten, Jeff Davis, Brad Sherwood and Gary Anthony Williams making frequent appearances as his duet partner, Stiles frequently expressed open disdain towards the "Hoedown" game, which became a bit of a running gag, while Mochrie, who cannot sing, mainly preferred to deliver his lines in a spoken word fashion, much like in the British original.

== History ==
The title card of seasons 1–8 of Whose Line Is It Anyway?

Whose Line Is It Anyway? was created by Dan Patterson and Mark Leveson in 1988 as a radio show on BBC Radio 4 in the United Kingdom. This early incarnation of the show is notable as being the origin of its tradition of having the performers read the credits in an amusing style; as it was a radio show, it was necessary for somebody to read the credits, and it was decided that it might as well be done as part of the program, rather than being done by a traditional BBC Radio announcer. This approach to reading credits was pioneered by the earlier BBC radio show I'm Sorry, I'll Read That Again. Indeed, the title of the show itself is a comedic riposte to another radio show, What's My Line, merged with the title of Whose Life Is It Anyway?, a 1970s play and teleplay.

The radio series lasted for six episodes, after which Channel 4 developed the franchise for television. The British television version lasted for a total of 10 seasons, with 136 episodes, all of which were hosted by Clive Anderson. Ryan Stiles and Colin Mochrie, who would later star in the American version, made their first appearances on the show in seasons 2 (1989) and 3 (1991), respectively. They remained regular cast members for the rest of the show's history, with Stiles becoming a permanent performer in every episode from season 7 (1995) onwards, as did Mochrie from season 8 (1996) onwards. Other regular performers on the US version who first appeared on the UK original were Greg Proops, Chip Esten, Brad Sherwood, and Wayne Brady. Like Stiles, Proops first appeared in season 2, while Esten and Sherwood first appeared in season 4 (1992). Brady made his first appearance in the UK show's tenth and final season (1998). Other regular performers on the UK series included John Sessions, Josie Lawrence, Paul Merton, Tony Slattery, Mike McShane, and Stephen Frost.

Drew Carey was a big fan of the original British series and was working with Ryan Stiles on the ABC sitcom The Drew Carey Show. Whose Line creator Dan Patterson had been trying to bring the show to the US, and with the success of The Drew Carey Show, Carey was able to successfully lobby ABC to produce and air a US version of the series, offering to host and become one of the executive producers along with Stiles.

The format of the US version was very similar to the UK version. A major difference was Carey's use of the game-show façade. While Anderson's point-scoring had always been arbitrary as a joke, he still presented the points as though they had real weight towards the outcome of the episode. Carey, meanwhile, explicitly stated at the start of each episode that "the points don't matter," and sometimes emphasized this fact throughout the episodes. Another difference, during Carey's tenure as host, was in the show's ending. On the UK version, the "prize" for winning was to read out the closing credits. On the US version, the winner would take over as host while Carey took part in the last game of the episode, with the performer(s) who read out the closing credits being arbitrary. Later, when Aisha Tyler took over as host, the show reverted to the original UK ending. The difference in standards in the UK compared to US prime time meant stricter censoring of both language and content on the US series.

Production of the show was cancelled by ABC in 2003 because of low ratings, with already-produced episodes airing first-run into 2004. The ABC Family cable channel, which had been airing repeats of the show since 2002, also showed "new" episodes from January 2005 to December 2007, formed from previously filmed but unaired performances.

=== Hiatus ===
Following the cancellation, Drew Carey went on to create the short-lived Drew Carey's Green Screen Show, which premiered in 2004 on The WB. The series was very similar to Whose Line?, and featured many of the same cast. The major gimmick on that series was that the acting was done in front of a green screen, and animators later added cartoon imagery to the scenes.

Carey and several cast members also started touring North America with a live-action show called (Drew Carey's) Improv All-Stars. The show was a live stage show similar to Whose Line?, and featured many of the same games, though also with some new ones. The live shows started in 2003, and since 2006, are only seen on occasion, mostly due to Carey's current television obligations. Colin Mochrie, Brad Sherwood and Drew Carey performed at the Just for Laughs festival in Montreal as "Improv All-Stars" in 2003 and 2004. Since 2005, Mochrie and Sherwood have toured semi-regularly as An Evening With Colin and Brad.

The show was recorded on Stage 29 at Paramount Studios.

Greg Proops and Ryan Stiles presented Stiles & Proops Unplanned, a live improv comedy show based on the successful Baddiel and Skinner Unplanned format that took place at Centaur Theatre in Montreal, Quebec, Canada in July 2008. They also tour with former co-star Jeff Davis under the name Whose Live Anyway? doing live improv.

=== CW revival ===
In February 2013, Ryan Stiles revealed in an interview that he would be returning to Los Angeles in April for a new season of Whose Line, hosted by Aisha Tyler and featuring the original cast of the U.S. version. The revival was later officially announced on March 1, 2013.

Whose Line Is It Anyway? returned to television in 2013, this time on The CW, with Colin Mochrie, Ryan Stiles, and Wayne Brady all returning, with Aisha Tyler taking the role of the host. Brady, who became host of a revival of Let's Make a Deal in 2009, began to concurrently star in Let's Make a Deal and Whose Line Is It Anyway? when the 2013 revival began. In addition to the traditional rotating fourth improv player (often drawn from the same pool of regulars that appeared on the original show), a new feature was that of a "special guest". This fifth player would not necessarily have an improv background but would still participate in some of the improv games.

The initial 2013 summer run was made up of twelve half-hour episodes, with the three veteran players joined by a featured player, along with a different special guest for each episode who would play in some of the games.

On July 29, 2013, The CW announced that it had renewed the show for a 24-episode season, airing Fridays at 8 ET/PT starting March 21, 2014, due to solid ratings. Illness prevented Stiles from appearing in two season 10 episodes, the first episodes of Whose Line not to include Stiles since episode 7 of the UK show's sixth season back in 1994. Frequent guest Greg Proops filled in for Stiles on these occasions. On July 18, 2014, The CW announced the renewal of the show for a 24-episode eleventh season, which premiered on April 17, 2015.

On November 4, 2022, regular performer Mochrie had announced that the show would film its "final" season in January 2023. After the CW stated that this was inaccurate, as no decision had been made yet, Mochrie clarified his comments in a February 2023 interview, saying that the cast never received fair compensation nor were they paid residuals. He also mentioned that producers and cast members referred to it as their last season, and that if the show continues afterwards, it "probably won't be with this cast". Mochrie also voiced displeasure regarding the show's minimal publicity, saying that the cast did most of the publicizing on their own social media. In June 2023, The CW's Head of Unscripted Programming, Heather Olander, stated that she did not know what the future of the series beyond that was and that they had discussed with the cast about whether they wanted to continue with the show.

Subsequently, a new season was announced on May 16, 2024. Tyler revealed in an interview in July 2025 that no episodes had been filmed since 2023, and that The CW had no plans for a 22nd season at that time.

== Performers ==
Several of the performers, including the three regulars Brady, Mochrie, and Stiles, had previously appeared in the original British run of Whose Line; other performers who had made appearances in the British version are Greg Proops, Brad Sherwood, Chip Esten, Karen Maruyama, Patrick Bristow and Josie Lawrence, as well as musician Laura Hall. Mochrie and Stiles have been permanent players since the American show began, while Brady was a permanent player from season 2 to 7 and from season 9 onwards, appearing as a recurring performer in seasons 1 and 8. Mochrie is the only performer to have appeared in every episode of the American series of Whose Line?, with Stiles having missed three recordings due to illness. Greg Proops is the most prolific recurring performer, having appeared in 87 episodes.

The show also included occasional guest fourth chairs during the first 8 seasons, each appearing in only one or two episodes, such as Stephen Colbert, Drew Carey Show performer Kathy Kinney, Robin Williams and Whoopi Goldberg. After the 2013 revival on the CW, celebrity guests appeared far more frequently, although only generally as an alternative to audience members in games such as Helping Hands or Living Scenery; such special guest stars have included Verne Troyer, Penn & Teller, Bill Nye and Alfonso Ribeiro. Occasionally more musically inclined guests, like Christopher Jackson and David Hasselhoff, also partook in singing games.

The original host of the American show was Drew Carey, who appeared in every episode of seasons 1 through 8. Carey notably took more of an active role in the show than his predecessor Clive Anderson, as following the announcement of the "winner" of each show, Carey would perform a game with the other performers. After the CW revival in 2013, Aisha Tyler took over as host, as Carey was the host of The Price Is Right, which ran at the same time as Whose Line; Carey is mentioned numerous times by Tyler and the other performers. Unlike Carey, Tyler does not perform full games with the other performers; nonetheless, she does occasionally interject in quick-fire games such as Scenes from a Hat with her own suggestions or to help another performer with their scene. Tyler has also surpassed Carey in tenure, although Carey hosted more episodes of the show.

Improvisational musician Laura Hall, who appeared in the final season of the British original, joined the original American format for its entire run and performed piano, keyboards and other instruments in games featuring improvisational singing by the cast members, such as Hoedown, Greatest Hits and Songstyles.

=== Main ===
Name	Role	Episodes	Seasons																				
Name	Role	Episodes	1 1998–1999	2 1999–2000	3 2000–2001	4 2001–2002	5 2002–2003	6 2004	7 2005	8 2005–2007	9 2013	10 2014	11 2015	12 2016	13 2017	14 2018	15 2019	16 2020	17 2021	18 2021–2022	19 2022–2023	20 2023–2024	21 2024
Colin Mochrie	Performer	431	Main																				
Ryan Stiles	Performer	428	Main																				
Wayne Brady	Performer	417	Recurring	Main						Recurring	Main												
Drew Carey	Host	219	Main																				
Aisha Tyler	Host	212									Main												

=== Recurring ===
- Greg Proops – 87 episodes (Seasons 1–8, 10–21)
- Brad Sherwood – 77 episodes (Seasons 1–8, 10–16, 19–21)
- Jeff Davis – 61 episodes (Seasons 3–5, 7–21)
- Charles "Chip" Esten – 45 episodes (Seasons 2–8, 13–16)
- Gary Anthony Williams – 44 episodes (Seasons 9–17, 19–21)
- Jonathan Mangum – 37 episodes (Seasons 9–21)
- Kathy Greenwood – 33 episodes (Seasons 2–5, 7–8)
- Heather Anne Campbell – 16 episodes (Seasons 9–11, 13–15, 17–19, 21)
- Denny Siegel – 14 episodes (Seasons 1–2, 6, 8)
- Keegan-Michael Key – 13 episodes (Seasons 9–12, 14, 18, 20)
- Nyima Funk – 8 episodes (Seasons 9–10, 17–20)
- Kathy Griffin – 4 episodes (Season 5)
- Karen Maruyama – 3 episodes (Seasons 1–2)

=== Musicians ===
- Laura Hall – 380 episodes
- Linda Taylor – 270 episodes
- Cece Worrall – 37 episodes
- Anne King – 10 episodes
- Anna Wanselius – 6 episodes

== Series overview ==
Season	Episodes	Originally released		
Season	Episodes	First released	Last released	Network
1	20	August 5, 1998	March 24, 1999	ABC
2	39	September 16, 1999	May 18, 2000	ABC
3	39	October 12, 2000	June 21, 2001	ABC
4	31	September 6, 2001	April 11, 2002	ABC
5	34	September 9, 2002	September 5, 2003	ABC
6	10	June 24, 2004	September 4, 2004	ABC
7	25	January 17, 2005	May 23, 2005	ABC Family
8	21	October 3, 2005	December 15, 2007	ABC Family
9	12	July 16, 2013	September 24, 2013	The CW
10	24	March 21, 2014	November 21, 2014	The CW
11	20	April 17, 2015	October 5, 2015	The CW
12	20	May 23, 2016	September 28, 2016	The CW
13	15	May 29, 2017	September 28, 2017	The CW
14	17	June 4, 2018	October 1, 2018	The CW
15	12	June 17, 2019	September 23, 2019	The CW
16	20	March 30, 2020	November 16, 2020	The CW
17	10	January 8, 2021	April 16, 2021	The CW
18	10	October 9, 2021	April 9, 2022	The CW
19	14	October 14, 2022	March 24, 2023	The CW
20	22	March 31, 2023	February 6, 2024	The CW
21	16	September 6, 2024	November 1, 2024	The CW

== Awards and nominations ==
Year	Award	Category	Recipient	Result	Refs
2001	Primetime Emmy Awards	Outstanding Individual Performance in a Variety or Music Program	Wayne Brady	Nominated	
2001	Primetime Emmy Awards	Outstanding Technical Direction, Camerawork, Video for a Series	Ted Ashton, Sam Drummy, Larry Heider, Bob Keys, John O'Brien, John Pritchett, Brian Reason, Easter Xua, Brad Zerbst	Nominated	
2002	Primetime Emmy Awards	Outstanding Individual Performance in a Variety or Music Program	Ryan Stiles	Nominated	
2002	Primetime Emmy Awards	Outstanding Individual Performance in a Variety or Music Program	Wayne Brady	Nominated	
2003	Primetime Emmy Awards	Outstanding Individual Performance in a Variety or Music Program	Wayne Brady	Won	

== International broadcast ==
As of September 28, 2025

The American version of Whose Line? has been broadcast in the UK, originally on Channel 4. Challenge was the first non-terrestrial channel to broadcast the show for a brief period in 2005. From 2007 to 2012, 5USA aired the show. Since February 2021, U&Dave has also broadcast the show. It is also available on its on-demand service, U, starting from season eleven onwards, marketed as series three of the revival. Several seasons of the show are also available on Amazon Prime Video.

In Canada, the show aired on the CTV network from 1998 to 2003, and then on The Comedy Network from 2003 onwards. The show's original run in Australia was on the Nine Network in an early morning time slot; One broadcast repeats from 2011. It also airs on The Comedy Channel. ABC has also aired the CW revival of the show on ABC Comedy.

== Home media ==
The first DVD of the American version of Whose Line?, Season 1 Volume 1, was released on September 26, 2006. It comes in "censored" or "uncensored" versions. Both releases include the first ten episodes of the first season, with the episodes being the same on either version. The first seven episodes have had their original theme music (including all credits and ad bumpers) replaced with the version used for the rest of the episodes. Warner Home Video released Season 1 Volume 2 on October 9, 2007, but only in an "uncensored" version.

Warner Home Video released a two-disc Best of Whose Line Is It Anyway? DVD with ten episodes on June 9, 2009. Featured in this release were celebrity guest episodes, including appearances by David Hasselhoff, Florence Henderson, Jerry Springer, Richard Simmons and bodybuilder Jayne Trcka, along with the hour-long "Best of Whose Line" compilation episode aired at the beginning of season three.

Of the 219 episodes from the original eight seasons, 186 of them are available to stream on Max.

DVD title	No. of episodes	Run time (minutes)	Release	Notes
Whose Line Is It Anyway?: Season One, Vol. 1	10	110	September 26, 2006	Uncensored
Whose Line Is It Anyway?: Season One, Vol. 1	10	220	October 9, 2007	Censored
Whose Line Is It Anyway?: Season One, Vol. 2	10	260	October 9, 2007	Uncensored
The Best of Whose Line Is It Anyway?	11	300	June 9, 2009	Uncensored; includes the special "Best of Whose Line" episode

== See also ==
- Whose Line Is It Anyway? (British TV series)
- Drew Carey's Green Screen Show
- Drew Carey's Improv-A-Ganza
- Kwik Witz
- Trust Us with Your Life
- Wild 'n Out
- Sponk!
