= Nguyen Cuong =

Vietnamese beatboxer

- Born: Nguyễn Cường; February 10, 1989 (age 37)
- Other name: Mr. T
- Occupations: Beatboxer; Rapper; DJ; Hip-hop dancer; tattoo artist
- Musical career
- Genres: Vocal music; Hip hop; Dubstep; Electro house
- Instruments: Beatboxing; beatrhyming; vocals; drum
- Years active: 2007 - present
- Website: www.mrthiphop.com

Nguyen Cuong (born February 10, 1989), best known by his stage name Mr. T, is a Vietnamese beatboxer. He became more popular for his appearance in Vietnam's Got Talent (February 2012). He had been famous after his winning K-Battle Beatbox (Southeast Asia Beatbox) in Thailand on 9 November 2012. He is now a leader and trainer of Saigon Beatbox Club.

== Career ==
Mr. T started beatboxing in 2007. He is one of the first beatboxers who popularized beatbox in Vietnam. He was a jury of Coca-Cola Phiêu Cùng Âm Nhạc (March to June 2011), Battle Beatbox X-Game Vietnam (6 November 2011). He has also opened a contest named Battle Beatbox Mr. T (May 2011). In early 2012, he participated in Vietnam's Got Talent and was in the semi-finals, but he did not compete in the semi-final due to a complaint and disappointment about the show's proviso.

At the end of 2012, Mr. T won the K-Battle Beatbox in Korat, Thailand.

He is still a jury of many shows in 2013, such as Battle Beatbox SouthBeat (January 2013), Battle Beatbox X-Game Vietnam (November 2013)... Mr. T also won the Sprite Hip-hop Central, held by YanTV in 2013.

== Mr. T Beatbox Tour ==
In 2013, Mr. T made a first time ever beatbox tour around Vietnam. A tour was held in 4 cities: Phan Thiet, Da Nang, Nha Trang, Da Lat. In 4 tours, he performed his personal skills of beatbox, include his performance in Thailand.

== Personal life ==
Mr. T now lives in Ho Chi Minh City. He's been a leader of Saigon Beatbox Club since 2012. He is also a former member of the club. He has a snapback collection and a Hip hop clothes shop in Ho Chi Minh City, and also a tattoo store.

In 2013, Mr. T made a 19-video beatbox tutorial on his YouTube channel. During his tutorial videos, he sometimes used KRNFX and RoxorLoops beatbox. On 8 June 2014, he decided to teach beatbox at his house for 3 months, every Sunday afternoon.

== Performance in competitions ==
List of Mr. T appearances in beatbox competitions
Year	Competition	Final position
2012	Vietnam's Got Talent	Quitted the Semi-finals
2012	K-Battle Beatbox Thailand	1
2013	Sprite Hip-hop Central	1
2014	Bạn Có Thực Tài?	Finalist of Week 2

== See also ==
- List of beatboxers
