= Kid Lucky =

American beatrhymer (1972–2020)

- Born: Terry Lewis; September 15, 1972; New York City
- Origin: New York City
- Died: October 23, 2020 (aged 48)
- Genres: Hip hop; Beatrhyming; Vocal Music
- Occupations: Beatrhymer, singer-songwriter
- Instrument: Beatrhyming

Terry Lewis (September 15, 1972 – October 23, 2020), also known by his stage name Kid Lucky, was an American beatrhymer, beatboxer, singer-songwriter, teacher, and activist born in New York City. He coined the term "beatrhyming", which he defines as "rapping, singing or performing spoken word while beatboxing simultaneously".

== Early life ==
Lewis grew up in New York City, and as a child, began scat singing and making sounds with his mouth. His desire to become a performer came from watching the music video of Janet Jackson's hit song "Rhythm Nation". He began writing plays and spoken word poetry, and was motivated to pursue beatboxing after seeing Doug E. Fresh in the movie Beat Street.

== Career ==
Lewis's career began founding and performing with the first production company in America for beatboxing, "Beatboxer Entertainment".

Beatboxer entertainment has been featured on shows such as MTV and Fuse, and has performed in Madison square garden. Lewis is a beatbox mentor who has worked with artists such as Kaila Mullady, Taylor McFerrin, D-Cross, Masai Electro, and Butterscotch. He is the founder and director of "Beatrhyme Communications". A collective of artists dedicated to promoting beatrhyming, beatboxing, and the vocal arts. He was featured in the movie Begin Again, beatboxing alongside Cee Lo Green. He is the organizer and curator of events such as the "American Human Beatbox Festival" and "The Hip Hop Subway series". He is currently being represented as a sound artist by "International Fine Arts Consortium". He is the conductor of "Nu-Voices". The first all-vocal orchestra consisting of beatboxers, beatrhymers, and vocalists of a wide variety of vocal styles. In 2018 Lewis received the lifetime achievement award for his role in the development of beatboxing and beatrhyming as paid professions through his work, promoting the careers of older and younger beatboxers and curating events and movements in which these artists are able to perform.

Lewis had been battling cancer for several years and died at 9:30am on October 23, 2020.
