= Jayne Trcka =

American bodybuilder, fitness model and actress (1963–2025)

- Born: February 27, 1963; Saint Paul, Minnesota, U.S.
- Died: December 12, 2025 (aged 62); San Diego, California, U.S.
- Occupations: Actress; bodybuilder; fitness model
- Years active: 2000–2025

Jayne Marie Trcka (February 27, 1963 – December 12, 2025) was an American bodybuilder, fitness model and actress.

== Background ==
Jayne Marie Trcka was born in Saint Paul, Minnesota, on February 27, 1963. She studied gymnastics and other sports in school, then started weight training after moving to Southern California in 1986.

Trcka died at her home in San Diego on December 12, 2025, at the age of 62. The cause of death, revealed on February 11, 2026, was hypertensive and atherosclerotic cardiovascular disease, complicated by a left femoral fracture. It was ruled an accident with alcohol playing a major factor.

== Career ==
By 1988, Trcka was competing in bodybuilding shows. In 1998, she quit her job with the postal service to focus on a fitness career and became a certified personal trainer. She began her acting career in 2000 with Scary Movie. She continued to perform in bodybuilding shows and pursued her acting career. In June 2023, she was also a realtor working for Realty Source California.

Trcka won first place at the 1997 California State Championships at age 34, the 1998 Junior Nationals, and the 2004 Los Angeles. She has top ten finishes in more than twenty other competitions.

She appeared in numerous muscle and fitness magazines, including Flex, MuscleMag International, Women's Physique World, Iron Man, and Fighting Females.

She also appeared in Lady Gaga's "Telephone" music video as a lady guard in a prison cell.

== Filmography ==
=== Films ===
Year	Title	Role	Notes
2000	Scary Movie	Miss Mann	Theatrical film debut
2002	The Black Magic	Hospital Security	
2003	Nudity Required	Darla	
2003	The Interplanetary Surplus Male and Amazon Women of Outer Space	Amazon	As Jane Trcka
2006	Cattle Call	Bull Dyke #2	

=== Television ===
Year	Title	Role	Notes
1990	The Drew Carey Show	Herself	
2003–2004	Whose Line is it Anyway?	Herself	
1994–1995	Don't Forget Your Toothbrush		
2000	MTV's Next	Gladiator	S6E01
2010	Tim and Eric Awesome Show, Great Job!	Jackie	
2010	The New Big Ball with Neil Hamburger	Linda	Final role

=== Music videos ===
Year	Song	Artist	Notes
2009	She's Got Me Dancing	Tommy Sparks	
2010	Telephone	Lady Gaga	Directed by Jonas Åkerlund
