= Karen Maruyama =

American actress and comedian (born 1958)

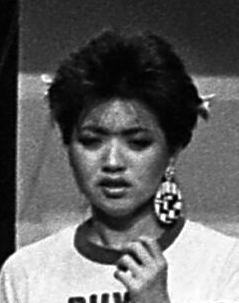
- Maruyama in 1986
- Born: May 29, 1958 (age 68)
- Occupations: Actress, comedian
- Years active: 1990–present

Karen Maruyama (born May 29, 1958) is an American actress and comedian.

== Career ==
Maruyama has appeared on television in supporting roles in a number of sitcoms, including recurring characters on The Jamie Foxx Show, Strip Mall, Suddenly Susan, and Arrested Development. Maruyama is well known as an improv performer and instructor, and was a featured guest on the American and British versions of Whose Line Is It Anyway?, as well as being a member of The Groundlings. She also appeared as a parking lot attendant in an episode of Curb Your Enthusiasm.

She played a nurse in The Bucket List (2007) and a housekeeper in the 2012 film The Campaign. She is part of the cast of The Jim Henson Company's live stage show "Puppet Up! - Uncensored" which has toured to Aspen, Las Vegas, Edinburgh, Sydney and Melbourne and is currently appearing monthly at Avalon Hollywood.

Maruyama was also featured as a fashion victim in an episode of the makeover show How Do I Look?. She also appeared as a non-celebrity contestant in May 1985 on the CBS game show, Body Language, under the name Karen Upshaw, saying she was from Perris, California. She was paired with celebrity players Ted Lange and Constance Towers. She was also on The New $25,000 Pyramid in 1983 with Audrey Landers and Michael McKean.

== Filmography ==
| Year | Title | Role | Notes |
|---|---|---|---|
| 1990 | Circuitry Man | Biker Bandit | |
| 1990–1991 | On the Television | Imelda Marcos | Episode: "Our Maid Imelda" |
| 1992 | Full House | Mrs. Knotts | Episode: "The Long Goodbye" |
| 1992 | Doogie Howser, M.D. | Kathy Walker | Episode: "Do the Right Thing... If You Can Figure Out What It Is" |
| 1994 | Viper | Police Operator | Episode: "Pilot" |
| 1994 | Pulp Fiction | Gawker #1 | |
| 1994 | Ellen | Kate | Episode: "Adam's Birthday" |
| 1995 | The Enforcer | | Voice |
| 1995 | Murphy Brown | Wardrobe Woman | Episode: "It's Miller Time" |
| 1995 | Sawbones | Polito | Television film |
| 1995 | The American President | Leo's Assistant | |
| 1996 | Dunston Checks In | Telephone Operator | |
| 1996 | Mad About You | Nurse #2 | Episode: "The Procedure" |
| 1996 | Rudy Coby: Ridiculously Dangerous | Grandma | Television film |
| 1996–1997 | Captain Simian & the Space Monkeys | Shao Lin | Voice |
| 1997 | Night Stand | Miyoshi | Episode: "Leave Your Job or I'm Leaving You" |
| 1997 | Caroline in the City | Actress | Episode: "Caroline and the Wayward Husband" |
| 1997 | Blade Runner | Fish Dealer | Video game, voice |
| 1997–1998 | Whose Line Is It Anyway? (UK) | Herself | 3 episodes |
| 1998–2000 | Whose Line Is It Anyway? (US) | Herself | 3 episodes |
| 1998 | Veronica's Closet | Event Official | Episode: "Veronica's Got a Secret" |
| 1998 | Holding the Baby | Mona | Episode: "Father Knows Breast" |
| 1998 | Guys Like Us | Kim | Recurring role |
| 1998 | Suddenly Susan | Mrs. Fong | 5 episodes |
| 1999 | The Thirteenth Year | Mrs. Nelson | Television film |
| 1997–1999 | The Simpsons | Japanese Stewardess, Dancing Lady #1 | Voice, 2 episodes |
| 2000 | The Wild Thornberrys | Leopard | Voice, episode: "Black and White and Mom All Over" |
| 2000 | King of the Hill | Buddhist | Voice, episode: "Won't You Pimai Neighbor?" |
| 2000 | Titus | Nurse Patty | Episode: "Episode Eleven" |
| 2000 | Static Shock | Kim | Voice, episode: "Grounded" |
| 2000 | Curb Your Enthusiasm | Female Parking Attendant (Joanna) | Episode: "Interior Decorator" |
| 1999–2001 | The Jamie Foxx Show | Gloria | 11 episodes |
| 2001 | Futurama | Amazonian | Voice, episode: "Amazonian Women in the Mood" |
| 2001 | Even Stevens | Millie | Episode: "A Weak First Week" |
| 2001 | Strip Mall | Foo | 9 episodes |
| 2001 | Heavy Gear: The Animated Series | Yoji Kirakowa | Voice |
| 2002 | Justice League | Tsukuri, Firefighter | Voice, episode: "Fury" |
| 2003 | Columbo | Maid | Episode: "Columbo Likes the Nightlife" |
| 2003 | Spider-Man: The New Animated Series | Head Protester, Shadowy Woman, Flower Vendor | Voice, 2 episodes |
| 2005 | The King of Queens | Connie | Episode: "Black List" |
| 2005–2006 | Avatar: The Last Airbender | Additional Voices | Episodes: "The Storm and The Serpent's Pass" |
| 2007 | The Bucket List | Nurse Shing | |
| 2010 | Raising Hope | Mrs Hwong | Episode: "Toy Story" |
| 2012 | The Campaign | Mrs. Yao | |
| 2012 | Crash & Bernstein | Vice-Principal Takashi | Episode: "Educating Crash" |
| 2013 | Good Luck Charlie | Coach | Episode: "Go Teddy!" |
| 2013 | 2 Broke Girls | Su-Min Lee | Episode: "And the Girlfriend Experience" |
| 2014 | Garfunkel & Oates | Susie | Episode: "Rule 34" |
| 2016 | Go-Go Boy Interrupted | Liz | Episode: "My First Time Doing Porn" |
| 2018 | Heathers | Mrs. Finn | 3 episodes |
| 2018 | Life of the Party | Mediator | |
| 2019 | Dead to Me | Marcy | Episode: “It's Not You, It's Me" |
| 2020 | Bosch | Wanda Williams | Episode: "Dark Sacred Night" |
| 2021 | Barb and Star Go to Vista Del Mar | Caricaturist | |
| 2022 | Dead End: Paranormal Park | Barborah | Voice |
| 2022 | I'm Totally Fine | Sandra | |
| 2023 | The Loud House | Nora Nussebaum, Fan | Voices, episode: "Road Trip: Screen Queen" |
| 2023 | Self Reliance | Lindsey | |
