= Denny Siegel =

American actress, comedian and writer

Denny Siegel is an American actress, comedian and writer, best known for appearing on the American version of the British improv comedy show Whose Line is it Anyway?. She has also appeared as a recurring correspondent on Comedy Central's The Daily Show with Jon Stewart.

Before her stint on Whose Line?, she was a writer and performer on the sketch comedy show Quick Witz, which ran on NBC. Other television credits include MTV's F*UPS, PBS's TV-411, and hosting the Metro Channel's Get Out of Town. Siegel has worked as a writer, host, and performer for live corporate events. She has performed improv at comedy festivals and venues including The Montreal Comedy Festival, the Big Stinkin' International Improv & Sketch Comedy Festival in Austin, Texas, the Bass Red Triangle Comedy Tour, the Toyota Comedy Festival, the Marshalls Women in Comedy Festival, The Improv, and The Friars Club.

She was also seen wrestling with Larry David in HBO's Curb Your Enthusiasm.

== Filmography ==
=== Film ===
Film
Year	Title	Role	Notes
2000	Show Me the Aliens!	Maureen Miranda	
2004	3719 Broadleaf Road	Phyllis	Short film
2009	Run for Your Life	Roxanne	Short film
2012	Turn Your Head and Coffin	Tracy	Short film Writer
2013	Can Frankie Come Out? 1	Cindy	Short film
2015	A Loan Officer and a Gentleman	—N/a	Short film Writer

=== Television ===
Television
Year	Title	Role	Notes
1998-2007	Whose Line Is It Anyway?	Herself / Performer	American version 14 episodes
1999	The Daily Show	Herself / Correspondent	3 episodes
2006	The Frank & Judy Show	Sally	TV short
2011	Curb Your Enthusiasm	Juliet Kravitz	Season 8, episode 3: "Palestinian Chicken"
2012	House	Diane	Season 8, episode 13: "Man of the House"
2014	The Comeback Kids	Amanda	Episode 6: "The Audition from Hell"
2016	Adam Ruins Everything	Weird Hippie Aunt	Season 1, episode 26: "Adam Ruins Christmas"
2017	Small Shots	Janet Goldberg	Episode 6: "Big Deal to Us"
2019	Single Parents	Crystal	Season 1, episode 22: "Lance Bass Space Camp"
