= Thierry Olemba =

Cameroonian musician (born 1982)

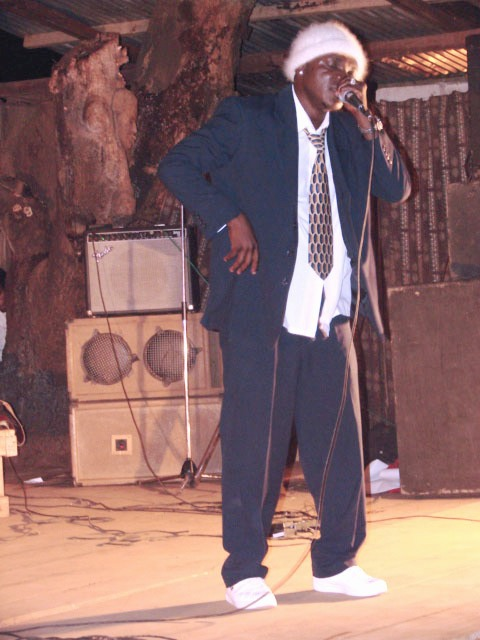
Thierry Olemba at First Friday, an event held by the U.S. Embassy in Yaoundé, Cameroon, on 6 October 2006.

Thierry Olemba (born July 13, 1982, in Douala) is a Cameroonian musician. His music incorporates elements of Makossa music, reggae and hip-hop and he is noted for his beat boxing. Alongside Bantu Pô Si, Koppo and Krotal, Olemba is one of the artists who have developed a Cameroonian style of rap.

He joined a rap group called New Black Power in 1990 as their youngest member and has since collaborated with other artists.

He signed a record contract with Farwell Records in 2007 and his debut album followed, called The Human BeatBox. His first single is Ma Grand mere joue au Billard, meaning "My Grandmother Plays Billard".
