= Kaila Mullady =

American beatboxer

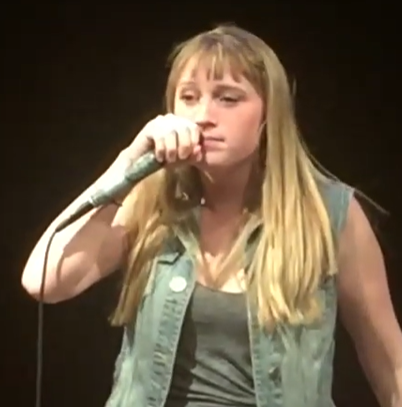
- Kaila Mullady at the 5th Annual American Human Beatbox Festival in 2015
- Born: April 11, 1993 (age 33); Long Island, United States
- Occupations: Beatboxer; Singer-songwriter; Multi-instrumentalist; Actress
- Musical career
- Origin: New York City, United States
- Genres: Vocal Music; Indie Rock
- Instruments: Beatboxing; Beatrhyming; Vocals
- Years active: 2011 - present
- Website: kailamullady.com

Kaila Mullady (born April 11, 1993) is an American beatboxer, beatrhymer, musician and actress. She won on Beatbox Battle World Championship 2015 & 2018 by category solo female. She is a former member of the Beatbox House crew. Kaila is a current member of the improv rap group Freestyle Love Supreme under the name Kaizer Roze.

== Early life ==
Mullady's interest in music and beatboxing began at a young age. She took up guitar at age ten and began beatboxing for parties when she got older. She originally planned on pursuing a career as a teacher, but over time became disinterested in teaching. In 2012 she met award-winning beatboxer J-Flo, and was introduced to the modern beatbox community. After an accident resulting in a broken back, which prevented her from performing, during her recovery, she met beatbox pioneer Kid Lucky. He introduced her to the art of beatrhyming which ultimately changed and defined the course of her artistry. He befriended Mullady and became her mentor and extensive collaborator.

== Career ==
Mullady is an active beatbox battler, whose championship titles include 2015 world female beatbox champion, as well as three-time beatrhyming champion, three-time American loopstation champion and 2014 vice American champion. She performs extensively as a member of groups like the American beatbox collective Beatbox House and the improv comedy, hip hop fusion troupe "North coast". She is head director of BEAT Global's Beat Rocker program, where she conceptualized a method of speech therapy which involves teaching beatboxing and beatrhyming as a method of developing speech articulation. In this program she actively teaches beatboxing to blind and mentally handicapped youth. She collaborates extensively with her mentor Kid Lucky as "The Adventures of Kaila and the Kid". They perform and teach workshops in the arts of beatrhyming and beatboxing nationwide. She also collaborates extensively with her former boyfriend, beatboxer, vocalist, musician and actor Mark Martin. They compete in beatbox tag team battles under the name "Power couple", and perform as a musical duo under the name "Lightship". She has showcased her beatboxing and singing abilities in commercials for product brands such as Clinique and Spoonflower.

Mullady beatboxed for the 2019-2022 Broadway show Freestyle Love Supreme.

== Musical style ==
Mullady has a variety of musical acts as a solo artist. She has a distinct style of beatboxing, which consists of polyrhythms, avant garde style compositions, incorporation of theatrical performance, the mouth trumpet technique and extensive beatrhyming. She is also noted for her one-woman band performances, which incorporate singing, beatboxing, guitar, rapping, and live looping.
