= Soul Inscribed =

American musical group

- Origin: New York City
- Genres: Hip hop; Soul Jazz; Jam band; Beatboxing
- Years active: 2011–present
- Label: Independent

Soul Inscribed is an American hip hop–fusion band and Beatbox crew from New York City.

== Formation ==
Soul Inscribed was formed by Baba Israel, who was raised in NYC by parents who were core members of "The Living Theater". He was the co-founder of the Australian hip hop crew Metabass'n'Breath. In 2000 he befriended and began working with future bandmate Yako 440, while on tour with DJ Logic. Baba and Yako then began to work on and release albums together which include, Force of Life, Beatbox Dub Poetics, and Highest Degree. They have also performed and worked together in theater productions and have toured with Boom bap meditations. Baba and Yako did music teaching at "The Door" community center in New York City where they met 17-year-old RnB-Soul Singer-Songwriter and Beatboxer, Jonathan "Duv" Zaragoza. The three formed a strong bond and Baba and Yako, began featuring Duv on their albums before co-producing his debut solo album ("Urban Artistik"). Duv then began teaching beatboxing and song writing workshops and gigging at various well known New York venues such as "The Blue Note", "Highline Ballroom", "Bowery Poetry Club", amongst others. They later united to form Soul Inscribed. In 2009, Baba Israel moved to England to work as the artistic director and CEO of "Contact", one of the world's leading arts venues working with youth. When returning to NYC, he collaborated with "The Kung-Fu Masters" meeting Saxophonist Sean Nowell, who served as a session performer for the group before joining full-time. Over the course of 2015 the group continued to record and perform music together, as well as teaching master classes in music production, songwriting, improvisation, and beatboxing.

== Career highlights ==
In 2016, the band was selected to perform and tour as part of the "American Music Abroad" program, sponsored by the United States State Dept. They toured Russia, Indonesia, Taiwan, and Mauritius, serving as cultural ambassadors. The group released their self-titled album on February 15. Baba and Yako created, wrote, and starred in The Spinning Wheel, a show paying tribute to the life, art and cultural impacts of Baba's father, Steve Ben Israel, an actor, musician, poet, artist, and activist. In April, Baba and Yako were featured in Brooklyn Academy of Music's program, "Poetry 2016: Past is Present."

== Band line-up ==
- Baba Israel: Rapping, Beatboxing, Didgeridoo
- Yako 440: Multi-instrumentation, Beatboxing
- Duv: Vocals, Beatboxing
- Sean Nowell: Saxophone, Flute, Beatboxing.
- Grace Galu: Vocals
- Doron Lev: Drums, Rapping
