= The Great American Joke Off =

American game series

- Genre: Game show
- Created by: Dan Patterson
- Presented by: Dulcé Sloan
- Country of origin: United States
- Original language: English
- No. of seasons: 1
- No. of episodes: 12

Production
- Executive producers: Dan Patterson; Jed Leventhall; Derek Van Pelt
- Production company: Angst Productions

Original release
- Network: The CW
- Release: March 31 – June 23, 2023

The Great American Joke Off is an American comedy panel game show that ran for one season in 2023 on The CW. The series is created by Dan Patterson — co-creator of the network's long-running improv comedy series Whose Line Is It Anyway? — and hosted by Dulcé Sloan.

== Format ==
Two teams, each consisting of three stand-up comedians, compete against each other over several rounds involving telling as many jokes as possible, whether pertaining to subjects as prompted by host Sloan, using texts on an audience member's phone, or in response to the comedians' own jokes. Sloan chooses the comedian or team of comedians she personally deemed to be the funniest in each round, and declares an overall winning team at the end of each episode.

== Episodes ==
No.	Title	Original release date	Prod. code	U.S. viewers (millions)
1	"Pretty Boys, IUDs & The Dairy Aisle"	March 31, 2023	109	0.35
Comedians: Team 1: Alonzo Bodden, Ed Gamble, Fahim Anwar Team 2: Moshe Kasher, Natasha Leggero, Matthew Broussard
2	"Wrong Seats, No Hands & Being Vague"	April 7, 2023	104	0.28
Comedians: Joe List, Mark Normand, Chanel Ali, Rhys James, Glenn Moore, Ismael Loutfi
3	"Peter Pan, They-mes Bond & Chic-Kendrick Lamar"	April 14, 2023	112	0.40
Comedians: Fahim Anwar, Moshe Kasher, Natasha Leggero, Rhys James, Ed Gamble, Milton Jones
4	"Creeds, Height Supremacists & A Female Riddler"	April 21, 2023	105	0.36
Comedians: Luke Mones, Matthew Broussard, Chanel Ali, Mark Normand, Rhys James, Ismael Loutfi
5	"Fashion Mullet, Bottom Gun & All Trump's Sons Combined"	April 28, 2023	110	0.35
Comedians: Luke Mones, Matthew Broussard, Chanel Ali, Mark Normand, Rhys James, Ismael Loutfi
6	"Killer Bees, Jennifer Ani-stan & Casablanc-aargh"	May 5, 2023	101	0.30
Comedians: Joe List, Luke Mones, Rebecca O'Neal, Rhys James, Glenn Moore, Josh Johnson
7	"Harry Potter, Sexy Narnia & Sabre Tooths"	May 12, 2023	107	0.24
Comedians: Glenn Moore, Matthew Broussard, Natasha Leggero, Hugh Dennis, Tom Allen, Alonzo Bodden
8	"Captain Kirk, Drunk Driving & Ohio's Not Real"	May 19, 2023	102	0.32
Comedians: Joe List, Luke Mones, Rebecca O'Neal, Rhys James, Glenn Moore, Josh Johnson
9	"Wonky Carrots, Christian Rock & Electric Ian"	June 2, 2023	111	0.40
Comedians: Fahim Anwar, Moshe Kasher, Natasha Leggero, Ed Gamble, Rhys James, Milton Jones
10	"Moist Cake, Choking Dolphins & Christian Diaper"	June 9, 2023	103	0.28
Comedians: Joe List, Mark Normand, Chanel Ali, Rhys James, Glenn Moore, Ismael Loutfi
11	"Holy Smokes, White Shrek & The Wisdom Tooth Fairy"	June 16, 2023	106	0.31
Comedians: Luke Mones, Matthew Broussard, Chanel Ali, Mark Normand, Rhys James, Ismael Loutfi
12	"Very Good Milk, Slugs & A Dead Fly"	June 23, 2023	108	0.38
Comedians: Glenn Moore, Matthew Broussard, Natasha Leggero, Hugh Dennis, Tom Allen, Alonzo Bodden

== Reception ==
Viewership and ratings per episode of The Great American Joke Off
No.	Title	Air date	Rating (18–49)	Viewers (millions)
1	"Pretty Boys, IUDs & The Dairy Aisle"	March 31, 2023	0.1	0.35
2	"Wrong Seats, No Hands & Being Vague"	April 7, 2023	0.0	0.28
3	"Peter Pan, They-mes Bond & Chic-Kendrick Lamar"	April 14, 2023	0.1	0.40
4	"Creeds, Height Supremacists & A Female Riddler"	April 21, 2023	0.1	0.36
5	"Fashion Mullet, Bottom Gun & All Trump's Sons Combined"	April 28, 2023	0.0	0.35
6	"Killer Bees, Jennifer Ani-stan & Casablanc-aargh"	May 5, 2023	0.1	0.30
7	"Harry Potter, Sexy Narnia & Sabre Tooths"	May 12, 2023	0.0	0.24
8	"Captain Kirk, Drunk Driving & Ohio's Not Real"	May 19, 2023	0.1	0.32
9	"Wonky Carrots, Christian Rock & Electric Ian"	June 2, 2023	0.1	0.40
10	"Moist Cake, Choking Dolphins & Christian Diaper"	June 9, 2023	0.0	0.28
11	"Holy Smokes, White Shrek & The Wisdom Tooth Fairy"	June 16, 2023	0.1	0.31
12	"Very Good Milk, Slugs & A Dead Fly"	June 23, 2023	0.1	0.38
