= Simon Shepherd =

English actor (born 1956)

- Born: Simon Stephen Shepherd; 20 August 1956 (age 69); Bristol, England
- Occupation: Actor
- Years active: 1972–present
- Known for: Dr Will Preston in Peak Practice
- Spouse: Alexandra Byrne (m. 1980)
- Children: 4

Simon Stephen Shepherd (born 20 August 1956) is an English actor best known to TV audiences from many appearances, including as Dr Will Preston in eight series of ITV's Peak Practice and Dr Jonathan Barling in Casualty.

Shepherd was born in Bristol. He went to school at Clifton College in Bristol and was a contemporary of the director Roger Michell in Brown's House. He subsequently attended Manchester Metropolitan University and Bristol Old Vic Theatre School and was a member of the National Youth Theatre.

As well as his television appearances he has had many notable stage and film roles since 1980, including as Lord Ashbrook in the 2011 Bristol Old Vic production of Helen Edmundson's Coram Boy.

== In popular culture ==
Shepherd was regularly mentioned in the BBC comedy Gimme Gimme Gimme as Tom's crush and appeared as himself in an episode of each series.

He played Patrick Simmons in the 1984 Miss Marple TV-adaptation of A Murder is Announced. In 1989, he appeared in Henry V and in 1990 in Chancer. He played Edgar Linton in the 1992 Wuthering Heights. In 1993, he appeared in Poirot ("Jewel Robbery at the Grand Metropolitan") as Andrew Hall and in Peak Practice. In 1999, he appeared in Catherine Cookson's Tilly Trotter and Rogue Trader. In 2008, he appeared in Agatha Christie's Poirot ("Mrs McGinty’s Dead") as Dr Rendell. In 2022, he appeared in theMidsomer Murders episode "The Scarecrow Murders". He played Chief Inspector Dermott Craddock in the 2019 The Mirror Crack'd, a stage play.

On 16 February 2011, Shepherd guest-starred in the 2000th episode of the BBC TV drama Doctors.

He played the role of Sir Norman Cavendish in the play The Duck House by Dan Patterson and Colin Swash, starring alongside Ben Miller and Diana Vickers. The show is a political farce based on the UK parliamentary expenses scandal of 2009 and played a five-week tour in October 2013 before transferring to London's Vaudeville Theatre through spring 2014.

In 2017 he appeared in the BBC series Father Brown as Edward Reese in episode 5.11 "The Sins of Others".

On 25 March 2017, Shepherd starred in BBC One's Casualty as Dr Jonathan Barling in the episode "Five Days". He reprised the role on 4 August 2018.

== Personal life ==
He married the costume designer Alexandra Byrne in 1980 and they have four children. Shepherd supports several charities, especially those involving the well-being of children (Barnardo's, Tearfund BOPS and Save the Children).

== Filmography ==
=== Film ===
| Year | Film | Role | Notes |
|---|---|---|---|
| 1983 | The Lords of Discipline | Senior | |
| 1985 | The Doctor and the Devils | Harding | |
| 1989 | Murder on Line One | Marty Jones | |
| 1989 | Henry V | Humphrey, Duke of Gloucester | |
| 1990 | Fire, Ice & Dynamite | Alexander | |
| 1992 | Wuthering Heights | Edgar Linton | |
| 1997 | Spice World | Doctor | |
| 1999 | Rogue Trader | Peter Norris | |
| 2001 | Two Days, Nine Lives | Rupert | |
| 2003 | Carmen | Magistrado | |
| 2012 | Frail | Newton | |
| 2019 | Bait | Tim Leigh | |
| 2021 | Mothering Sunday | Giles Hobday | |

=== Television ===
| Year | Film | Role | Notes |
|---|---|---|---|
| 1973 | Jackanory Playhouse | Prince Fortunatus | Episode: "The Magician's Heart" |
| 1978 | Lillie | Lord Alfred Douglas | 2 episodes |
| 1979 | The House on Garibaldi Street | Nickalous | Television film |
| 1979–1982 | BBC2 Playhouse | John Gray / Rupert Brooke | 2 episodes |
| 1980 | Company and Co | Otto Bokova | Episode: "In Concert" |
| 1981 | My Father's House | Jake Staveley | 3 episodes |
| 1982 | Stalky and Co. | Cradall | Episode: "A Little Prep" |
| 1983 | The Blue Dress | Adam | Television film |
| 1983 | Jackanory | Prince Zorn | 3 episodes |
| 1984 | The Jewel in the Crown | Second Lieutenant | Episode: "The Towers of Silence" |
| 1984 | Sorrell and Son | Duncan Scott | Episode: "Episode #1.2" |
| 1984–1985 | Robin of Sherwood | Alan-a-Dale / Robert of Huntington (voices) | 2 episodes Uncredited |
| 1985 | Miss Marple: A Murder is Announced | Patrick Simmons | 3 episodes |
| 1985 | Time and the Conways | Robin Conway | Television film |
| 1985 | Time for Murder | Lawrence Penwarden | Episode: "This Lightning Always Strikes Twice" |
| 1986 | May We Borrow Your Husband? | Peter Travis | Television film |
| 1986 | Lytton's Diary | TV Interviewer | Episode: "National Hero" |
| 1989 | The Dark Angel | Captain Oakley | 2 episodes |
| 1989–2000 | The Ruth Rendell Mysteries | Stephen Devenish / Ivor Fairfax Swan | 4 episodes |
| 1990 | Sunday Pursuit | Mr. Gerald | Television film |
| 1990–1991 | Chancer | Piers Garfield-Ward | 20 episodes |
| 1991–2018 | Casualty | John Ferris / Dr Jonathan Barling | 4 episodes |
| 1992 | Cluedo | Clive Moxton | Episode: "Deadly Dowry" |
| 1993 | It's Your Choice: Selection Skills for Managers | Interviewee #3 | Video |
| 1993–2002 | Peak Practice | Dr Will Preston | 81 episodes |
| 1993–2008 | Poirot | Dr Rendell / Andrew Hall | 2 episodes |
| 1994 | Pie in the Sky | Chris Bentley | Episode: "A Shot in the Dark" |
| 1995 | Bliss | Sam Bliss | Television film |
| 1995 | Beyond Reason | Duncan McAllister | Television film |
| 1996 | Tales of Erotica | Narrator | Segment: "The Insatiable Mrs Kirsch" |
| 1998 | A Life for a Life | Taylor | Television film |
| 1999 | Tilly Trotter | Mark Sopwith | 4 episodes |
| 1999 | Warriors | Major 'Brick' Stone | TV series |
| 1999−2001 | Gimme Gimme Gimme | Himself | 3 episodes |
| 2006 | Tripping Over | Simon | 2 episodes |
| 2008 | The Invisibles | Peter Rackham | Episode: "Episode #1.3" |
| 2008 | Heartbeat | Edward Wilson | Episode: "Danse Macabre" |
| 2010 | A Touch of Frost | Tom Viner | 2 episodes |
| 2011 | Doctors | George Liston | Episode: "Quarantine" |
| 2011 | Holby City | Tony Valentine | Episode: "In Between Days" |
| 2014 | Death in Paradise | Jacob Doran | Episode: "Political Suicide" |
| 2017 | Father Brown | Edward Reese | Episode: "The Sins of Others" |
| 2017 | Riviera | Alan Morgan | Episode: "Faussaires / Counterfeiters" |
| 2019 | Shakespeare and Hathaway: Private Investigators | Frederick Greenwood | Episode: "The Envious Court" |
| 2020–2021 | Alex Rider | Sir David Friend | 3 episodes |
| 2021 | Midsomer Murders | The Rev Oscar Hayden | Episode: "Scarecrow Murders" |

=== Short films ===
| Year | Film | Role | Notes |
|---|---|---|---|
| 1995 | Trip – A Mythology | Jack Kerouac character | |
| 2002 | Pas de Trois | Toby | |
| 2009 | Luke & the Void | George | |
| 2011 | David Rose | Doctor | |
| 2020 | Returning | Ed | |
| 2021 | On Island West | Hector | |
