= Sarah Nagourney =

American singer-songwriter

- Born: Sarah Nagourney Songwriter/Singer/Producer; Connecticut, U.S.

Sarah Nagourney is an American songwriter, artist development strategist, and founder of Glassbeat Music, Inc.

== Discography ==
ARTIST	SONG	ALBUM	LABEL
No Fly List	"Better Off"	Single	No Fly List
Kastra/INViDA featuring Montagu	"Constellations"	Single	Ultra Records
SAMMY & LESEN, INViDA, JeLa	"Went to Tulum"	Single	Unlimited Music Records
Heather Sommer	"i like you more in my dreams"	Single	Heather Sommer
LTX & James Maslow feat. Heather Sommer	"History"	Single	Sadboy Records
Alec Chambers	"Heart of Me"	Single	Meserole Sound Studio
Alec Chambers	"Heart of Gold 2.0"	Single	Meserole Sound Studio
Alec Chambers	"Something To Cry About"	Single	Glassbeat Music
Alec Chambers	"Something To Cry About" (Acoustic)	Single	Glassbeat Music
Alec Chambers	"Something To Cry About" (GOLDHOUSE Remix)	Single	Glassbeat Music
Alec Chambers	"Cold"	Single	Glassbeat Music
Alec Chambers	"Cold" (Acoustic)	Single	Glassbeat Music
Meg Smith	"Cross My Heart I Hope U Die"	Single	Meg Smith
Tiggi Hawke feat. Sondr	"For What It's Worth"	Single	Armada Music
INViDA feat. Robbie Rosen	"10,000 Feet"	Single	Gemstone Records
Newclaess, Radiozoo	"Where I Wanna B Tonight"	Single	AESTHETE
Basto!	"Hopeless Dreamer" (feat. Polina)	Live Tonight	Spinnin' Records
Oh Honey	A Thousand Times	Wish You Were Here	Atlantic Records
Wynonna	"Who Am I Supposed to Love"	What the World Needs Now Is Love	Curb Records
Jon Williams	"Who Am I Supposed to Love"	JW - EP	AYR
Wayne Brady	"Ordinary"	A Long Time Coming	Peak Records
Alec Chambers	"Boston"	Single	Glassbeat Music
Alec Chambers	"Boston" (Remix)	Single	Glassbeat Music
Alec Chambers	"Closure" (Remix)	Single	Glassbeat Music
Alec Chambers	"Closure"	Single	Glassbeat Music
Alec Chambers	"Whole Again"	Whole Again (EP)	Glassbeat Music
Alec Chambers	"Lost in Translation"	Whole Again (EP)	Glassbeat Music
Alec Chambers	"Bleecker Street"	Whole Again (EP)	Glassbeat Music
Alec Chambers	"Heart of Gold"	Whole Again (EP)	Glassbeat Music
Alec Chambers	"Do You See Me"	Single	Glassbeat Music
Zarif	"Silence Room"	Box of Secrets	Bright Pink Records
House of Lords	"World Upside Down"	World Upside Down	Frontiers/RCA Records
Sam Bisbee	"Parachute"	Son of a Math Teacher	Le Grand Magistery
Polina	"Shotguns"	Shotguns	Ministry of Sound
Myriam Abel	"Silence Room"	"Silence Room" - Single	Gravitas
Carnie Wilson	"Wings of Dreams"	A Mother's Gift	Big3 Records
Julie	Permanent"	Home*	EMI Denmark
Sita	"Twisted"	Happy*	Jive Records
Triple Image	"Never Gonna Stop"	Celebrate	Koch
Scandal'us	"Startin' Somethin'"	Startin' Somethin'*	Festival Mushroom Records
Randy Crawford	"Permanent"	Permanent	WEA
Southside Johnny	"No Secret"	Slow Dance	Cyprus
Karen Tong	"What Color Is It in Heaven?"	What Color Is It In Heaven?	Polydor Records
Blake	"Dancing on Top of the World"	Start Over	EMI UK
Brandon October	"Starting Something"	Temptation	BMG
Sarah Nagourney	"Space Between Us Melts"	Realm of My Senses	Polystar Records
Sarah Nagourney	"Get Over the Cure"	Realm of My Senses	Polystar Records
Sarah Nagourney	"Get Back to That Emotion"	Realm of My Senses	Polystar Records
Sarah Nagourney	"Realm of My Senses"	Realm of My Senses	Polystar Records
Sarah Nagourney	"Let Myself Go"	Realm of My Senses	Polystar Records
Sarah Nagourney	"Tomorrow"	Realm of My Senses	Polystar Records
Sarah Nagourney	"Last Time You Were Me"	Realm of My Senses	Polystar Records
Sarah Nagourney	"What Colour Is It in Heaven"	Realm of My Senses	Polystar Records
Sarah Nagourney	"Life's Parade"	Realm of My Senses	Polystar Records
Sarah Nagourney	"Out of the Wilderness"	Realm of My Senses	Polystar Records
Sarah Nagourney	"Pleasure"		Invasion Records
Sarah Nagourney	"Do You Remember"		Invasion Records
Sarah Nagourney	"Tell Me (All Your Secrets)"		Invasion Records

Song	Artist	Film/TV Sync
"Christmas Comes Just Once a Year"	Park Drive	The Santa Con (Lifetime TV)
"Undecided"	Anne Marie Milazzo	Running In Heels (Style Network)
"Melting"	Leslie Mills	"Las Vegas" (NBC), Confessions of a Sociopathic Social Climber (Oxygen Network), America's Next Top Model (CW)-(2 Episodes)
"Wings of Dreams"	Mindy Smith	TV Commercial for Vanderbilt Children's Hospital
"Never Gonna Stop"	Triple Image	A Cinderella Story (starring Hilary Duff)
"Perfect World"		Party of Five (Sony Pictures Release)
"Never Gonna Stop"	Johanna Halverson	MGM's Ghostworld
"Twisted"	Mareme Hernandez	The Young and the Restless
"Let Myself Go"	Sarah Nagourney	The Young and the Restless
"Something Said Stay"	Sophia	One Life to Live
