= Nagourney =

Nagourney is a surname. Notable people with the surname include:

- Adam Nagourney (born 1954), American journalist
- Sarah Nagourney, American songwriter
