= Trust Us with Your Life =

- Genre: Improvisational comedy
- Based on: Fast and Loose by Dan Patterson
- Developed by: Dan Patterson; Mark Leveson
- Directed by: Geraldine Dowd
- Presented by: Fred Willard
- Starring: Wayne Brady; Colin Mochrie; Jonathan Mangum; David Armand
- Announcer: Jonathan Mangum
- Theme music composer: Patron Saints of Music
- Composer: Cat Gray
- Country of origin: United States
- Original language: English
- No. of seasons: 1
- No. of episodes: 8 (2 unaired)

Production
- Executive producer: Dan Patterson
- Production location: London, England
- Running time: 21 minutes
- Production company: Angst Productions

Original release
- Network: ABC
- Release: July 10 – July 24, 2012

Related
- Whose Line is it Anyway? (U.S.), Fast and Loose

Trust Us with Your Life is an American improvisational comedy television series, based on the BBC Two program Fast and Loose. It premiered on ABC on July 10, 2012. It was hosted by Fred Willard and starred comedians Wayne Brady, Colin Mochrie, and Jonathan Mangum, with rotating performers which included Greg Proops, Craig Cackowski, Brad Sherwood, Nicole Parker, and Josie Lawrence. The performers would act out scenes in the lives of guest celebrities. Serena Williams, Ricky Gervais, Jerry Springer, Florence Henderson, Mark Cuban, Jack and Kelly Osbourne, David Hasselhoff and Jane Seymour appeared. Eight episodes were filmed in London, England.

== Games ==
- Dramatic Episode - The performers act out a scene using information from the guest. The guest rings a bell every time the performers get something right and honk a horn when they get something wrong. Similar to "First Date" from Improv-a-Ganza.
- Face the Music - David Armand illustrates through mime a popular song with significance to the guest star (who wears a set of headphones so they can't hear the song). After Armand's performance, the guest must figure out what the song is. Played as "Interpretative Dance" on Fast and Loose.
- Forward/Rewind - The performers act out a scene using information from the guest and they must rewind and go forward when prompted by a pre-recorded voice. Originally appeared in BBC's Fast and Loose also featured in the American version of Whose Line is it Anyway .
- Glee Club It! - A scene is acted out and when a pre-taped voice saying "Glee Club It!" is played, the performers must start singing until the voice says "back to normal".
- Guess the Location - A scene is acted out on a road trip. The first two performers act out the scene while the other two act as residents of the different locations. The others must then try to guess where they are. Only played on the Jane Seymour episode.
- Messages From Random Acquaintances - The performers provide rapid-fire messages to the guest as if they were friends and acquaintances of the guest and alternate when Fred buzzes. This game is usually done during the credits.
- Musical Tribute - With the help of keyboardist Cat Gray (who works with Wayne and Jonathan on Let's Make a Deal), the performers sing a song about the guest's life in a style suggested by Fred. Similar to "Song for a Lady" from Improv-a-Ganza.
- Putting Words into Your Mouth - The guest takes the stage with one or two of the comedians, another of the comedians will talk for the guest while the scene continues. Similar to "Dubbing" from Whose Line?.
- Rap It! - The performers act out a scene and start rapping when the voice says "Rap It!" and go back to normal when they hear a voice saying "Word!". Similar to "Kick It!" from Improv-a-Ganza.
- Shorter and Shorter - The performers have sixty seconds to perform a scene, then they have to do the same scene again in a thirty-second version, and then fifteen seconds, and so on.
- Sideways Scene - Three of the performers use information from the guest to act out a scene lying down on a special mat behind the set with a camera positioned above them. Fred would randomly buzz in with styles for them to act it out in. This sketch is usually done when the celebrity's story involves sports. This game was later played in the 2013 revival of Whose Line?
- Styles - The performers act out a scene using information given by the guest. When Fred presses a button to sound a buzzer, he has the performers restart the scene in a different style. Similar to "Film, TV and Theatre Styles" from Whose Line? and "Options" from Improv-a-Ganza.

== Episodes ==
No.	Guest(s)	Cast	Original release date	US viewers (millions)
1	Serena Williams	Wayne Brady, Jonathan Mangum, Greg Proops, Colin Mochrie	July 10, 2012	3.34
2	Jack & Kelly Osbourne	Colin Mochrie, Jonathan Mangum, Craig Cackowski, Wayne Brady	July 10, 2012	3.03
3	Mark Cuban	Wayne Brady, Brad Sherwood, Jonathan Mangum, Colin Mochrie	July 17, 2012	2.63
4	Ricky Gervais	Colin Mochrie, Greg Proops, Jonathan Mangum, Wayne Brady	July 17, 2012	2.54
5	Jerry Springer	Colin Mochrie, Jonathan Mangum, Brad Sherwood, Wayne Brady	July 24, 2012	1.92
6	Florence Henderson	Wayne Brady, Jonathan Mangum, Craig Cackowski, Colin Mochrie	July 24, 2012	1.83
7	David Hasselhoff	Colin Mochrie, Nicole Parker, Jonathan Mangum, Wayne Brady	Unaired	N/A
8	Jane Seymour	Colin Mochrie, Josie Lawrence, Jonathan Mangum, Wayne Brady	Unaired	N/A

== Broadcast history ==
Episodes 7 and 8 were originally scheduled to air July 31 and August 7, 2012, respectively. Even though the show was put on hiatus on July 30, these episodes were put on video streaming sites and were available to purchase the day after their originally-scheduled airdates.
