= Katy Brand's Big Ass Show =

British television series

- Katy Brand's Big Ass Show Opening Credits Series 2 & 3
- Created by: Katy Brand
- Written by: Katy Brand; David Armand; Andrew Dawson; Steve Dawson; Tim Inman; Peter Morris; Andy Riley; Kevin Cecil; Rupert Russell; Sam Spedding; Nick Tanner; Emma Kennedy
- Directed by: Adam Miller
- Starring: Katy Brand
- Country of origin: United Kingdom
- Original language: English
- No. of series: 3 (plus christmas special)
- No. of episodes: 19

Production
- Producer: Gregor Cameron
- Running time: 30 minutes (60 mins Big Ass Songs)
- Production company: World's End Productions

Original release
- Network: ITV2
- Release: 19 October 2007 – 15 October 2009

Related
- Touch Me, I'm Karen Taylor

Katy Brand's Big Ass Show is a British comedy programme that was broadcast on ITV2.

The show features comedian Katy Brand in skits of real life situations and stereotypes, as well and celebrities such as Amy Winehouse, Lily Allen, Lady Gaga, Angelina Jolie, Adele and Kate Winslet.

The second series began on 2 September 2008. The series was carried in Canada on CBC's bold channel as of October 2008, and in Portugal on RTP2, each Sunday latenights at 11:50 pm, on the "Britcom" strand (the first non-BBC series to be broadcast on this strand).

Her comic clips in the second series include Princess Beatrice of York, Kate Moss, Leona Lewis, Jesus, the Queen, and Secret Diary of a Call Girl.

A Christmas special called Katy Brand's Big Ass Songs of 2008 aired on 13 December 2008.

The third and final series ran from 10 September 2009 to 15 October 2009.

When Katy appeared on Justin Lee Collins: Good Times she stated that there would be no more series of Katy Brand's Big Ass Show and that she would end the show with a live tour throughout April 2010.

== Ensemble cast ==
- Katy Brand
- Katherine Parkinson
- David Armand
- Margaret Cabourn-Smith
- Zoe Gardner
- Kobna Holdbrook-Smith
- Rufus Jones
- Tom Knight
- James Lance
- Joan Linder
- Joanna Neary
- Rupert Russell
- Dave Skinner
- Ian Stone
- Nick Tanner
- Velile Tshabalala
- Guido Adorni
- Di Botcher
- James Doherty
- Michael Fenton Stevens
- Alexander Kirk
- Laura Lawson
- Barunka O'Shaughnessy
- Daniel Taylor
- Feri Tezcan
- Bhasker Patel
- Renton Skinner
- Bindya Solanki
- Sam Spedding
- Elliott Tiney
