= The Duck House =

Comedy farce play

- 2013 production poster
- Written by: Dan Patterson; Colin Swash
- Genre: Comedy Farce, Satire

Premiere
- Date: 23 October 2013
- Place: Yvonne Arnaud Theatre

The Duck House is a 2013 comedy farce play written by Dan Patterson and Colin Swash. It is based around the events of the 2009 UK parliamentary expenses scandal, and made its world premiere at the Yvonne Arnaud Theatre in October 2013, at the start of a five-week UK tour. The production then transferred to the West End's Vaudeville Theatre, where it ran until 29 March 2014.

== Synopsis ==
The play is set in May 2009, one year before the General Election, Gordon Brown's Labour government is unpopular. Robert Houston is a Labour backbencher seeking to defect to the Conservatives to keep his seat, when the expenses scandal hits the papers the day before his interview with Sir Norman Cavendish to complete the switch. Houston is in trouble and so is his staff (his wife Felicity, his son Seb and his Russian housekeeper Ludmilla) and somehow Seb's girlfriend Holly becomes involved with Sir Norman. What follows is a comedy of errors as Houston and his family try to cover their expenses claims including a massage chair, a glittered toilet seat, hanging baskets and an ornamental duck house.

== Production history ==
The Duck House is a farce and political satire written by Mock the Week's producer Dan Patterson and Have I Got News for You writer Colin Swash. Set during Gordon Brown's tenure as Prime Minister it is based on the events of the 2009 UK parliamentary expenses scandal. The show's title is in reference to one specific MP's expense claim – that of Sir Peter Viggers of £1,645 for a duck house at his constituency home. The production was directed by Terry Johnson featuring set and costume design by Lez Brotherston, sound by John Leonard and lighting by Mark Henderson. The show held a pre-West End tour starting in October 2013 at the Yvonne Arnaud Theatre in Guildford with further dates in Malvern, Nottingham and Cambridge before beginning previews at the Vaudeville Theatre, London on 27 November 2013, with an official opening night on 10 December, booking until 29 March 2014. The show's lead roles were played by Ben Miller, Debbie Chazen, James Musgrave and Simon Shepherd. Whilst speaking about the show Miller said "They say that comedy equals tragedy plus time, and traumatic as the expense scandal was hopefully we can all now have a bloody good laugh about it. And if any MPs don't like it they can always claim for it on expenses." Only one politician attended the shows opening night, former Labour home secretary Alan Johnson. A typical performance runs two hours and 15 minutes, including one interval of 15 mins.

== Principal roles and original cast ==
Character	Original pre and West End performer
Robert Houston	Ben Miller
Felicity Houston	Nancy Carroll
Sir Norman Cavendish	Simon Shepherd
Holly	Diana Vickers
Ludmilla	Debbie Chazen
Seb	James Musgrave
Voice of Radio DJ	Graham Norton
Voice of Harriet Harman	Jessica Martin
Voice of Charlotte Green	Charlotte Green
Voice of Gavin Esler	Gavin Esler

== Critical reception ==
The production received mixed to positive reviews. Charles Spencer in The Telegraph wrote that the show featured some "sublime comic moments" and that "Subtle it certainly ain’t, but at its ribald best The Duck House proves genuinely hilarious." The Metro described actor Ben Miller as an "unimpeachable, amazingly assured comic presence throughout" and described the direction of Terry Johnson as delivered with "verve and precision".

Some were more critical. Dominic Maxwell in The Times noted the show was by first time playwrights and the play started "fast and it’s really funny", but felt the show's plot structure didn't ultimately have enough support to it. He concluded however that "plenty of the crowd kept laughing till the end." Ian Shuttleworth of The Financial Times felt that although the play was "topical" it took "passing shots at pretty much every other political “outrage” of recent years" and as such was "lazier even than a dedicated couch potato." He did however praise what he called a "fine production", praising Johnson's attention to the "broad farce and the sardonic one-liners" and praising Miller as an "effective linchpin."

== Awards and nominations ==
=== London production ===
Year	Award	Category	Nominee	Result	Ref
2014	Laurence Olivier Award	Best New Comedy		Nominated	
