= Fast and Loose (TV series) =

- Genre: Improvisational comedy
- Created by: Dan Patterson
- Directed by: Geraldine Dowd
- Presented by: Hugh Dennis
- Starring: David Armand; Justin Edwards; Pippa Evans; Humphrey Ker; Marek Larwood; Laura Solon
- Country of origin: United Kingdom
- Original language: English
- No. of series: 1
- No. of episodes: 8

Production
- Producer: Dan Patterson
- Running time: 30 minutes
- Production company: Angst Productions

Original release
- Network: BBC Two
- Release: 14 January – 4 March 2011

Related
- Trust Us with Your Life

Fast and Loose is a British television series which was broadcast on BBC Two in 2011. Conceived by Dan Patterson, one of the creators of the TV series Whose Line Is It Anyway?, it mirrors the series in format and style with the addition of some new games. Guests take part in improvised sketches in which each comedian inhabits a certain character or film genre. The only series was eight episodes long and hosted by comedian Hugh Dennis. Fast and Loose is the inspiration for the 2012 American show Trust Us with Your Life on ABC, hosted by Fred Willard and featuring a celebrity guest on each episode.

== Format ==
The style and format was similar to Channel 4's Whose Line Is It Anyway? and Mock the Week both of which are also produced by Dan Patterson. Each episode had six performers, with an additional guest performer for one of the sketches.

=== Games ===
- Forward/Rewind: Participants are given a scenario to act out and the host may call out "forward" or "rewind" as he pleases while the players must follow accordingly.
- Interpretive dance: A player (usually David Armand) will mime out a popular song while the other participants are wearing mufflers and must guess what song it is.
- Double Speak Game: A pair of players (who talk either in unison or saying every other word) acts as an expert on a topic suggested by the audience while another pair (with the opposite restrictions) is either interviewing or learning from the first pair.
- Sideways Scene: Players must act out a scene while lying on the floor. The camera is positioned from the ceiling, thereby giving viewers the illusion that the players are in an upright position. When Whose Line is it Anyway? was revived on The CW in 2013, Sideways Scene was added to its game rotation.

== Episodes ==
No.	Performers	Guest	Original release date
1	Greg Davies, Justin Edwards, Pippa Evans, Humphrey Ker, Marek Larwood, Laura Solon	David Armand	14 January 2011
2	Wayne Brady, Justin Edwards, Humphrey Ker, Jonathan Mangum, Jess Ransom, Laura Solon	David Armand	21 January 2011
3	David Armand, Greg Davies, Justin Edwards, Humphrey Ker, Marek Larwood, Jess Ransom	Pippa Evans	28 January 2011
4	Wayne Brady, Ruth Bratt, Justin Edwards, Pippa Evans, Jonathan Mangum, David Reed	David Armand	4 February 2011
5	Greg Davies, Justin Edwards, Pippa Evans, Humphrey Ker, Marek Larwood, Laura Solon	David Armand	11 February 2011
6	Ruth Bratt, Justin Edwards, Pippa Evans, Humphrey Ker, Tom Parry, David Reed	David Armand	18 February 2011
7	Greg Davies, Justin Edwards, Pippa Evans, Humphrey Ker, Marek Larwood, Laura Solon	David Armand	25 February 2011
8	David Armand, Greg Davies, Justin Edwards, Humphrey Ker, Marek Larwood, Laura Solon	Pippa Evans	4 March 2011
