= David Armand =

Comedian, actor and writer from Kettering, England, born 1977

- Born: David Robert Whitehead; September 1977 (age 49); Kettering, Northamptonshire, England

Comedy career
- Medium: Television, film, stand-up
- Genres: Physical comedy, slapstick
- Subject: Pop culture

David Armand (born David Robert Whitehead in September 1977) is an English comedian, actor and writer who has performed on stage, film, radio and most notably, television, where the shows he has appeared in include Armstrong and Miller, EastEnders, My Family, Peep Show, Rush Hour, How Not to Live Your Life, and Episodes.

He is one of the writers and stars of the hit CBBC comedy shows Sorry, I've Got No Head, and its sister show, Pixelface. He has also written for shows such as The Peter Serafinowicz Show and Katy Brand's Big Ass Show.

== Early life and career ==
Armand was educated at Latimer Community Arts College, St Catharine's College, Cambridge and the London Academy of Music and Dramatic Art. As a member of the sketch comedy troupe The Hollow Men, he appeared at the Edinburgh Fringe four times between 1999 and 2002, travelled to America as a participant at the 2003 US Comedy Arts Festival in the Colorado mountain resort of Aspen, and to Canada for a performance at Montreal's 2005 Just for Laughs festival. The troupe wrote and starred in their self-titled TV series for the American network Comedy Central as well as two series for BBC Radio 4.

He is well known for his mime style interpretive dance of Natalie Imbruglia's "Torn" (in character as "Austrian interpretive dance artist Johann Lippowitz"). A 2005 performance was broadcast by HBO Comedy and subsequently spread through the Internet. The performance is often incorrectly labelled as "Karaoke for the Deaf". He performed his famous dance on stage live with Natalie Imbruglia at the 2006 Secret Policeman's Ball for Amnesty International. The performance started with Armand dancing with Imbruglia singing live vocals backstage, then on-stage, and concluded with Imbruglia performing Armand's dance moves alongside him.

Utilizing the "Johann Lippowitz" alter ego, he has performed several other songs, including Paul Young's "Wherever I Lay My Hat". and "Don't Look Back in Anger" by Oasis.

Armand starred in BBC Three sitcom, How Not to Live Your Life as Eddie Singh, the over-enthusiastic caregiver for the late grandmother of the show's leading character, Don Danbury (Dan Clark). He has also appeared in several online BBC comedy sketches under the title This is Wondervision.

In 2011 he appeared on BBC2's improv show Fast and Loose, where he performed an interpretive dance routine to a different song each week. Two cast members had to guess the song title based on his routine.

In February 2012 Armand appeared as John in Alan Ayckbourn's Absent Friends at the Harold Pinter Theatre, London, receiving a positive review from Michael Billington.

In July 2012, he made regular appearances on the American TV show Trust Us with Your Life on ABC, performing interpretive dance to a popular song related to some aspect of the guest celebrity on that week's show, which the celebrity (wearing noise-cancelling headphones) was challenged to guess.

He appeared in Comedy at the Hippodrome with Ardal O'Hanlon and Adam Kay in 2017.

== Credits ==
=== Film ===
Film
| Year | Title | Role | Notes |
|---|---|---|---|
| 2007 | I Want Candy | Clive Purves | |
| 2007 | Elizabeth: The Golden Age | Walsingham's Agent | |
| 2009 | St Trinian's 2: The Legend of Fritton's Gold | Police Officer | |
| 2014 | Mrs. Brown's Boys D'Movie | James | |
| 2015 | Martian Land | Background Person | Direct-to-video |

=== Television ===
Television
| Year | Title | Role | Notes |
|---|---|---|---|
| 1997–2009 | Armstrong and Miller / The Armstrong and Miller Show | Various | 14 episodes |
| 2001 | Happiness | Man in Clinic | Series 1, episode 2: "I'm Doing It for Me" |
| 2001 | Comedy Lab | | Series 4, episode 1: "Orcadia" |
| 2003 | EastEnders | Delivery Man | 1 episode |
| 2003 | My Family | Sales Assistant | Series 4, episode 6: "Deliverance" |
| 2003 | Coming Up | Dave | Series 1, episode 3: "Re-Ignited" |
| 2003 | Casualty | Steven Williams | Series 18, episode 3: "Breathe Deeply" |
| 2004 | Peep Show | Rejected Dancer | Series 2, episode 1: "Dance Class" |
| 2004 | The Last Chancers | Nick | Episode #1.4 |
| 2005 | The Hollow Men | Various | 5 episodes |
| 2005 | Swinging | Various Roles / Bob / Patty's Dad / Patient | 7 episodes |
| 2005 | My Family and Other Animals | George, the Tutor | TV movie |
| 2006–2008 | Pulling | Richard | 10 episodes |
| 2007 | Rush Hour | Pervy Boss, Uni of Life Dad, AA Man | |
| 2007 | Get a Grip | Various | Episode #1.5 |
| 2007–2009 | Katy Brand's Big Ass Show | Himself/Various | 12 episodes Writer – 3 episodes |
| 2008 | Never Better | Drew | Episode 2: "Life and Soul" |
| 2008 | Jesus Boy and the Goatherd | Sat Nav | Voice; TV short |
| 2008 | Uncle Max | —N/a | Writer – 3 episodes |
| 2008 | The Peter Serafinowicz Show | Various | Christmas special |
| 2008–2011 | Sorry, I've Got No Head | Various | 29 episodes |
| 2008–2011 | How Not to Live Your Life | Eddie Singh | 20 episodes |
| 2011 | Fast and Loose | Himself | 7 episodes |
| 2011–2012 | Pixelface | Rex Dynamo | 26 episodes Writer – 7 episodes |
| 2012 | Trust Us with Your Life | Himself | 6 episodes |
| 2012–2015 | Episodes | Maurice / Another Executive | 7 episodes |
| 2013 | Pramface | Father Thomas | Series 2, episode 1: "The Edge of Hell" |
| 2013 | Fit | —N/a | Writer – 2 episodes |
| 2013 | BBC Comedy Feeds | | Series 2, episode 3: "Kerry" - Also Writer, script editor |
| 2014 | Trying Again | Job Centre Clerk | Episode 1 |
| 2015 | Horrible Science | Alexander Bell | Episode 9: "Sounds Dreadful"; Writer – 4 episodes |
