= Frankie Boyle =

Scottish comedian (born 1972)

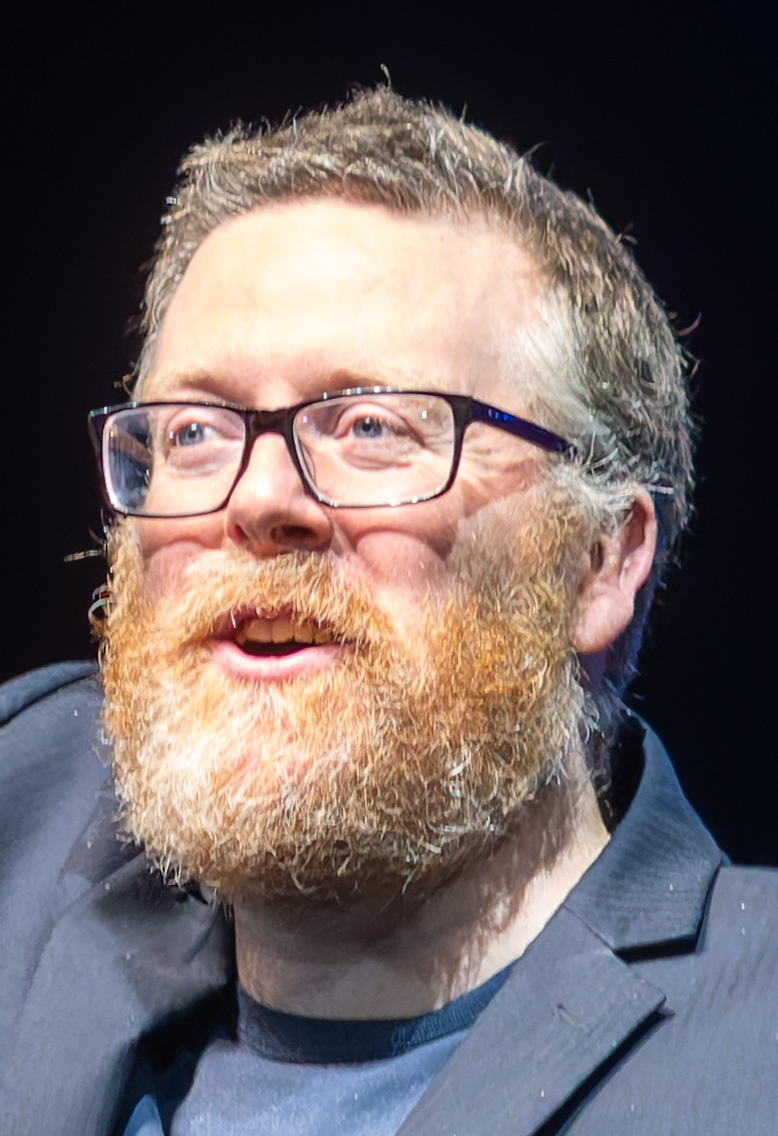
- Boyle in 2024
- Born: Francis Martin Patrick Boyle; 16 August 1972 (age 54); Pollokshaws, Glasgow, Scotland
- Education: Langside College; Aston University; University of Sussex (BA)
- Children: 2

Comedy career
- Years active: 1995–present
- Medium: Stand-up, television, radio
- Genres: One-liners, black comedy, blue comedy, satire, insult comedy, surreal humour
- Subjects: Scottish culture, celebrities, politics, family, current events
- Website: frankieboyle.com

Francis Martin Patrick Boyle (born 16 August 1972) is a Scottish comedian and writer. Boyle first gained widespread recognition as a regular panellist on the comedy show Mock the Week from 2005 until 2009. He then created and starred in the Channel 4 sketch show Frankie Boyle's Tramadol Nights (2010) and BBC Two's chat show Frankie Boyle's New World Order (2017–2022). In 2020, he presented a four-part series on BBC Two, Frankie Boyle's Tour of Scotland. He has toured and released several stand-up specials. Boyle has been involved in public controversies due to his humour.

== Early life and education ==
Francis Martin Patrick Boyle was born on 16 August 1972 in Pollokshaws, Glasgow, to Irish Catholic parents from Crolly in County Donegal.

He attended St Conval's Primary and Holyrood Secondary School in Glasgow. After leaving school, he worked as a library assistant over the summer and attended Langside College. He then studied urban planning at Aston University for a year before leaving and beginning a BA in English literature at the University of Sussex.

He graduated from university aged 22 and his first job was working in a mental health hospital. He then went to a teacher-training college in Edinburgh and had placements in schools, but by then was performing as a stand-up comedian.

== Career ==
Boyle first performed stand-up at the University of Sussex Student Union, later gaining his big break after performing at The Stand Comedy Club in Edinburgh and winning an open-mic event at the 1996 Edinburgh Fringe Festival. His comedy influences include Billy Connolly, Bill Hicks and Spike Milligan.

=== Television ===
==== Mock the Week (2005–2009) ====
Boyle was a regular on the BBC panel show Mock the Week from its first episode on 5 June 2005 until 17 September 2009. A programme in which the panel comment humorously on news stories from the British media, Mock the Week was hosted by Dara Ó Briain, who in an episode of Live at the Apollo referred to Boyle as "the dark heart of Mock the Week". He is known for his morbid sense of humour, which plays on negative images of celebrities, politicians and society (particularly his home country Scotland). On 2 October 2009, Boyle announced via the Mock the Week's Facebook fan page that he was leaving the show to concentrate on other projects.

Boyle has since criticised both the show's production team and the BBC Trust. He claims the show did not cover enough major news stories and was too restrictive on his risqué comedy act, because the producers and the BBC Trust were afraid of "frightening the horses". He is seen in archive footage of Mock the Week on the 2009 Christmas Special, which aired on 22 December 2009, as a series of "Best Bits and Festive Clips", in a compilation celebrating the show's 100th episode on 5 July 2012 as well as in archive footage on the 2012 Christmas Special, which aired on 27 December 2012.

==== Frankie Boyle's Tramadol Nights (2010) ====
In October 2009, Boyle piloted a sketch and stand-up show for Channel 4, entitled Deal With This, Retards to be produced by RDF Scotland subsidiary the Comedy Unit. Boyle mentioned on Friday Night with Jonathan Ross that the original title of the show had been dropped, due to its offensive nature, and been renamed Tramadol Nights and aired from the end of November 2010. An official page launched via Channel 4's official website, which confirmed that the show's full name is Frankie Boyle's Tramadol Nights and the series was made up of six episodes. Boyle caused controversy on the show with his comments about Katie Price and Dwight Yorke's disabled son, Harvey.

==== Frankie Boyle's Rehabilitation Programme pilot (2011) ====
On 21 August 2011, it was revealed that Channel 4 had given Boyle permission to record a pilot for a topical talk show in October of that year, which would be called Frankie Boyle's Rehabilitation Programme (despite the controversy surrounding Frankie Boyle's Tramadol Nights). Channel 4 head of comedy Shane Allen told the press that "it's very much like Parkinson or Wogan, but with paedo jokes" and that the show would feature Boyle "in a studio, riffing off the audience a bit with some people challenging what he says". The pilot's format is similar to his later Autopsy shows and to Frankie Boyle's New World Order, with Boyle making controversial statements which are discussed and challenged by his guests. It was included on the DVD release of The Last Days of Sodom.

==== The Boyle Variety Performance (2012) ====
Boyle on giving Margaret Thatcher a state funeral

"Give her a state funeral because a lot of people will want to pay their respects and lot more people will want proof that she's really dead. It will be the first time the 21-gun salute shoots the coffin."

The Boyle Variety Performance was broadcast on 19 August 2012 and featured Boyle with guests Rob Delaney, Nick Helm, Katherine Ryan and Tom Stade. A few days after the show was broadcast, Boyle attracted criticism after he posted jokes on Twitter about the 2012 Summer Paralympics.

==== Gasping (2014) ====
In 2014, Frankie Boyle starred in the short comedy film Gasping for BBC Scotland, written by Greg Hemphill. The title refers to an expression in Scottish English, communicative of an irresistible compulsion to do something, such as smoke a cigarette; or, as here, to drink alcohol. The short feature is an at-times-farcical but generally deadpan treatment of a man's attempted recovery from alcoholism.

==== Frankie Boyle's Autopsy (2014–2016) ====
Frankie Boyle's Referendum Autopsy was released on 28 September 2014, and Frankie Boyle's Election Autopsy was released on 17 May 2015, through BBC iPlayer. Featuring guests Katherine Ryan and Sara Pascoe, Boyle dissected the Scottish independence referendum, 2014 and general election. Frankie Boyle's American Autopsy dissected the buildup and fallout of the United States presidential election, tackling topics such as feminism, entertainment, propaganda, and guns. Special guests include Sara Pascoe, Katherine Ryan, Michelle Wolf, Desiree Burch, and Richard Osman.

==== Frankie Boyle's New World Order (2017–2022) ====
A show similar to his BBC iPlayer exclusive "autopsy" shows, Boyle returned to TV on BBC Two, with his Frankie Boyle's New World Order, which follows a very similar structure to the aforementioned programmes, where Frankie makes two statements, and discusses them with his guests. The show premiered on 8 June 2017 and was cancelled in 2023.

==== Frankie Goes to Russia (2018) ====
A two part travel documentary on BBC TV filmed in Russia in the lead up to the World Cup being held there. Featuring interviews with Russian football fans and others.

==== Frankie Boyle's Tour of Scotland (2020) ====
A four-part travel documentary filmed around Scotland, Frankie Boyle's Tour of Scotland, was shown on BBC Two in early 2020, it also featured Boyle performing work in progress shows prior to a stand-up tour. The stand-up special which followed, Frankie Boyle Live: Excited for You to See and Hate This, filmed in Glasgow, was broadcast on BBC Two in July 2020.

==== Frankie Boyle's Farewell to the Monarchy (2023) ====
In a Channel 4 documentary, Boyle discusses historical British kings and queens, comparing them to the modern royal family. Under the name Frankie Boyle: Monarchy, the project was announced in 2022, shelved after the death of Elizabeth II and aired in 2023 shortly before Charles III's coronation.

=== Radio ===
==== Blocked pilot (2014) ====
A sitcom set in a small regional theatre starring David Mitchell as a happy-go-lucky writer with writer's block written by Frankie Boyle and Steven Dick, broadcast on BBC Radio 4 on 5 June 2014.

=== Journalism ===
Boyle contributes occasional articles to UK newspapers, including satire and opinion pieces for the British newspaper The Guardian. He wrote a regular column for The Sun until 2012.

=== Books ===
On 1 October 2009, Boyle's autobiography My Shit Life So Far was released, published by HarperCollins. His second book Work! Consume! Die!—a collection of his columns for The Sun—was released in October 2011. Boyle's third book, the political comedy Scotland's Jesus: The Only Officially Non-racist Comedian, was released in the UK on 24 October 2013. As of October 2021, the three books had sold 600,000 copies in the UK for £5 million, with My Shit Life So Far as the best-selling of these. Boyle's fourth book, The Future of British Politics, was released 12 November 2020 as one of five essays in the Futures series.

Boyle's first fictional book, Meantime, is a crime fiction novel set in Glasgow in the aftermath of Scottish Independence. It was published in July 2022. The book was nominated for Bloody Scotland's Debut of the Year award for crime writing. Boyle wrote for the book while in hotel rooms after a gig, saying that he would be unable to sleep due to adrenaline. Boyle said at the Edinburgh Book Festival in 2022: "I would much rather, if I could, segue into writing novels and just stay in the house and not travel so much". He said of writing, in comparison to stand-up comedy, that "you don't have to go and sell it to people". However, he said that writing fiction was "equally difficult". He planned to begin writing a second novel over Christmas 2022.

=== Podcasts ===
In 2024, Boyle started the podcast Here Comes The Guillotine with fellow Scottish comedians Susie McCabe and Christopher MacArthur-Boyd.

He has also appeared as a guest on an episode of Off Menu, recorded live at the SEC Armadillo in Glasgow.

== Stand-up career ==
In October 2007 Boyle embarked on a stand-up tour of Britain, playing over 100 dates and enjoying a sold-out run that was extended through until December 2008. Boyle said that he planned to retire from live stand-up before he turned 40, had written his final tour, and planned to do more television work after this. Boyle performed the tour, entitled I Would Happily Punch Every One of You in the Face, between March and December 2010.

On 21 November 2011, at a "Meet the Comedians" session in the Apple Store, Regent Street with Jimmy Carr, Boyle announced he was doing another tour entitled The Last Days of Sodom, despite intending I Would Happily Punch Every One of You in the Face to be his final one. He mentioned the tour would not be as long as its predecessor. His website stated it would run from July to December 2012 with more dates to be added. Tickets went on sale in December 2011.

=== Live tours ===
Year	Title
2007–2008	Morons, I Can Heal You
2010	I Would Happily Punch Every One of You in the Face
2012	The Last Days of Sodom
2015	Hurt Like You've Never Been Loved
2019	Full Power
2023	Lap of Shame

=== DVD releases ===
On 10 November 2008, Boyle's first DVD was released, featuring a sell-out stand-up performance given at London's Hackney Empire and some additional material, including a documentary about the tour, entitled Fuck You Scotland, and some sketches from the BBC Three comedy Rush Hour. The DVD was described by WhatDVD.net as "certainly not one to watch with your grandparents – not unless they are pretty open-minded!"

Boyle has also featured in three DVD compilations of material from Mock the Week. The compilations, entitled Too Hot for TV, include material deemed too offensive for broadcast on TV and uncut versions of several full episodes. Boyle's second live DVD, If I Could Reach Out Through Your TV and Strangle You I Would, was released on 15 November 2010.

=== Podcast ===
On 16 July 2009, Boyle's first podcast was released. Entitled Mock the Week Musings, the podcast is a recording of Boyle testing the material he has written for Mock the Week to a London audience. Boyle comments on his material throughout and often informs the audience that certain jokes are not going into the show due to their reaction (or lack thereof), and the podcast carries an explicit content warning. The recording includes some audience interaction, with Boyle offering to test some of his new "put-downs" on the crowd.

Between 2013 and 2015, Boyle, along with Canadian comedian Glenn Wool hosted a number of editions of a podcast known as Freestyle, which involved Boyle and Wool speaking about topical and controversial news stories, including Madeleine McCann, Bill Cosby, and obscure takes on popular culture.

=== Comic book ===
In September 2010, Boyle began publishing his comic strip Rex Royd in the launch issue of CLiNT magazine, co-written with comedian Jim Muir and with artwork by Michael Dowling. The story follows a Lex Luthor-style newspaper magnate with a super-villain alter-ego. Initially, the strip ran for first four issues of CLiNT. The strip resumed again in November 2011, until the final issue in August 2013, when publisher Titan announced that CLiNT was ending.

=== Other appearances ===
Boyle appeared as himself in the video game Grand Theft Auto: The Lost and Damned (2009), in a stand-up routine at Liberty City's Split Sides Comedy Club. He appeared on Real Radio Wales's weekly comedy show Comedy Nighthorse on 19 October 2011.

Boyle made his theatrical stage debut playing the role of Hamm in a production of the Samuel Beckett play, 'Endgame'. The show ran in the Gate Theatre, Dublin, from February 2022 and concluded in late March.

== Personal life ==
As of 2008 Boyle was living in Glasgow and has two children: a daughter (born 2004) and a son (born October 2007). He is an atheist. He has said that his career had caused him to neglect his family. He is divorced.

Boyle is a supporter of the Glasgow-based Celtic Football Club. Throughout 2017, Boyle supported Jack Thomas, a British Paralympic swimmer who suffered a number of unfortunate career setbacks, via Twitter and through donations.

Boyle attended the Gaelic Football, Senior Club County Final in 2018 between Naomh Conaill and Gaoth Dobhair. Boyle posted a picture to his Instagram account of himself and Donegal footballer Eamon McGee with the Sam Maguire Cup, a trophy awarded to the winner of the All Ireland Football Championship.

During an interview, he has also claimed to be a follower of Advaita Vedanta.

=== Health ===
Boyle was an alcoholic, having started drinking at the age of 15 and stopped at 26, and is also a former drug user, who now maintains a life of sobriety.

During his teenage years, Boyle claimed that he received treatment for depression but has also declared "I don't really think it was depression. In terms of depression being a chemical illness, I don't think I had that – in fact, quite the opposite. I'm strangely optimistic usually". He has since spoken fondly of neuro-linguistic programming.

During an interview on Friday Night with Jonathan Ross in 2010, he revealed that he has a fear of flying, and travels to shows in England by train. When making the TV show Frankie Goes to Russia before the 2018 World Cup, he travelled there by train.

On the premiere of the fourth series of Frankie Boyle's New World Order, he said that he was infected with COVID-19 at a comedy gig early in the pandemic.

=== Politics ===
Boyle is a supporter of Noam Chomsky and says that Chomsky has had a great influence on his political beliefs, stating he is more left-wing than Chomsky himself.

In July 2013, he supported Shaker Aamer, the last UK resident being held at Guantanamo Bay detention camp, by going on a hunger strike. He also donated £50,000 to his legal fund.

Boyle is a Scottish republican. In 2013, when asked "How do you feel about Scottish independence?" Boyle replied: "Yes, I think we should be independent. What have we got to lose? A Tory government? I'm looking forward to the vote just because it will be a novelty for Scottish people to fill in official forms while still in possession of their own belt and shoelaces. And imagine what Scotland's annual Independence Day celebrations will look like; the fucking D-Day Landings".

In December 2020, Boyle said in a podcast with Louis Theroux that he believes that Ricky Gervais's jokes on transgender people are "lazy" and that Gervais should "have the same respect for trans people that he seems to have for animals".

In response to the Rwanda asylum plan unveiled by the Johnson government in 2022, Boyle denounced the scheme on Twitter, writing that "The reason you don't have a significant fascist party in Britain is that those voters are very happy with the government". An article for The National noted that Boyle's opposition to the asylum plan reflected widespread popular sentiment in Scotland, as several leading Scottish politicians (including Nicola Sturgeon) had also denounced the plan.

During the July–September 2022 Conservative Party leadership election, Boyle criticised the two major candidates running for the position of Prime Minister, Liz Truss and Rishi Sunak, on an episode of The Last Leg. During the episode, Boyle also criticised former Prime Minister Boris Johnson for his handling of the COVID-19 pandemic in the United Kingdom, stating to Johnson that "You finished [your term] with a quote from The Terminator. The Terminator! After you killed 150,000 fucking people during the pandemic. I don't want to sound like I've got a grudge or anything, but I hope a vent opens up in the ground and clawed hands drag you screaming into hell".

Also on The Last Leg, in March 2023 Boyle criticised the candidates in the 2023 SNP Leadership Election. He wished there were "more progressive candidates", such as Mhairi Black, on the table, rather than candidates such as Kate Forbes, who had issues with same-sex marriage, and Humza Yousaf, based on his record as Health Secretary in Scotland.

Boyle has been a long-time supporter of Palestinian rights and a critic of Israeli policy. In 2010 the BBC Trust apologised for a joke made by Boyle in which he compared Palestine to a cake being punched to pieces by a very angry Jew. Boyle criticised the Trust, saying, "The Trust's ruling is essentially a note from their line managers. It says that if you imagine that a state busily going about the destruction of an entire people is fair game, you are mistaken. Israel is out of bounds."

More recently, Boyle has been vocal in his support of the Palestinian people throughout the Gaza genocide. Boyle wrote on X, "I can't help feeling what's happening in Gaza is the beginning of the end for all of us. If we can have a genocide live-streamed during the Super Bowl and say nothing, there's no challenge in the coming years that we won't fail." Boyle also signed a letter calling for a stop to the proscription of Palestine Action in 2025 as well as participating in a Gaza benefit concert in 2024 and supporting The National's Gaza fundraising campaign in 2025.

== Filmography ==
=== Television ===
Title	Episodes
Mock the Week	74
Frankie Boyle's New World Order	41
Taskmaster	10
8 Out of 10 Cats	7
Frankie Boyle's Tramadol Nights	6
Rush Hour	6
Argumental	4
Have I Got News for You	4
Live at the Apollo	4
When Were We Funniest?	3
Never Mind the Buzzcocks	3
Would I Lie to You?	3
You Have Been Watching	3
Friday Night with Jonathan Ross	2
The Jonathan Ross Show	2
News Knight with Sir Trevor McDonald	2
Burnistoun	1
The Charlotte Church Show	1
Alan Carr: Chatty Man	1
The Graham Norton Show	1
They Think It's All Over	1
QI	1
The Rubberbandits Guide	1
Comedians Giving Lectures	1

=== Video games ===
Year	Title	Role	Notes
2009	Grand Theft Auto IV: The Lost and Damned	Himself	Voice role

=== Stand-up DVDs & online streaming video releases ===
Year	Title	Venue	Platform
2008	Frankie Boyle Live	Live at London's Hackney Empire	DVD release
2010	If I Could Reach Out Through Your TV and Strangle You, I Would	Live at London's Hammersmith Apollo	DVD release
2012	The Last Days of Sodom	Live at Glasgow's King's Theatre	DVD release
2016	Hurt Like You've Never Been Loved (Netflix exclusive)	Live at Glasgow's Citizens Theatre	Netflix Exclusive
2020	Excited for You to See and Hate This	Live at Glasgow's King's Theatre	BBC 2 Special

=== Theatre ===
Year	Title	Venue
2022	Endgame by Samuel Beckett	Dublin's Gate Theatre

== Controversies ==
Boyle has been involved in several public controversies due to his humour.

=== Rebecca Adlington ===
In August 2008, complaints were received about comments he made regarding English Olympic swimmer Rebecca Adlington on Mock the Week, saying that she "looks like someone who's looking at themselves in the back of a spoon" and that her boyfriend must be attracted to her due to an aspect of her sexual behaviour. The BBC ruled that the jokes were indeed "humiliating" and "risked offending the audience", while also calling Boyle "a brilliant member of the team". Despite this, Adlington's agent said that simply admitting mistakes was not enough, saying: "By giving Frankie Boyle a rebuke they fail to discourage others from doing the same". Adlington subsequently commented on the issue, saying "It's obviously not the nicest thing but he's a comedian, isn't he? Comedians make jokes. I cannot say I don't laugh when a comedian tells a joke about someone else. So it would be hypocritical to turn round and say you can't joke about me".

=== The Queen ===
Whilst impersonating Queen Elizabeth II in the "Scenes We'd Like To See" segment of Mock The Week (the prompt being "What the Queen didn't say in her annual Christmas message"), Boyle said "I've had a few medical problems this year. I am now so old, that my pussy is haunted". This caused many to complain about the state that the BBC had come to, with Conservative MP David Davies calling the joke a "disgracefully foul comment". Boyle was eventually cleared of any misconduct by the BBC Trust, although they called the comment "sexist and ageist".

=== Down's syndrome ===
During a performance on his 2010 tour, Boyle interrupted a "long, seemingly semi-improvised skit" about Down's syndrome by challenging a woman in the front row who seemed uncomfortable with the material. The audience member explained that her five-year-old daughter had the condition and strongly criticised Boyle's portrayal of people with Down syndrome. Mencap spokesman Ismail Kaji said that the comments could be misconstrued and seen as "no different to bullying".

=== Palestine and Israel ===
In April 2010, the BBC Trust's Editorial Standards Committee apologised for a joke made by Boyle on Radio 4 panel show Political Animal in which he likened the situation in Palestine to "a cake being punched to pieces by a very angry Jew". Boyle also made another joke where he said that he had "been studying Israeli Army martial arts. I now know 16 ways to kick a Palestinian woman in the back". In response, Boyle published a letter in which he criticised the Trust's "cowardly rebuke of my jokes about Palestine" and reprinted the jokes in question. He then criticised the BBC for not broadcasting a humanitarian appeal during the 2008–2009 Gaza War, saying that it was "tragic for such a great institution but it is now cravenly afraid of giving offence and vulnerable to any kind of well drilled lobbying". Boyle then said that the situation in Palestine "seems to be, in essence, apartheid", concluding that he had reached this position after watching a documentary about life in Palestine that he said had driven him to tears.

In 2018, Boyle accused BBC television producers of "editing out" comments he made on New World Order about Palestinian deaths on the Gaza border and his joke about "Israel being an Apartheid state".

=== Harvey Price ===
In December 2010, both Katie Price (a.k.a. Jordan) and Peter Andre were said to have been left "absolutely disgusted and sickened" by a joke that was made on Frankie Boyle's Tramadol Nights about Price's disabled son, Harvey. On the show, Boyle said: "Apparently, Jordan and Peter Andre are fighting each other over custody of Harvey. Although eventually one of them will lose and have to keep him". Then he added: "I have a theory that Jordan married a cage fighter (Alex Reid) because she needed someone strong enough to stop Harvey from fucking her".

Andre's representative responded to the comments made by Boyle and said "We're all disgusted by these comments. Peter is angry and very upset at Harvey being mocked in this way. Children, especially a disabled youngster, should be off-limits". Both confirmed that they had sought legal action and wrote a complaint to Channel 4 regarding Boyle's jokes with Price saying: "To bully this unbelievably brave child is despicable; to broadcast it is to show a complete and utter lack of judgement. I have asked my lawyers to write to Channel 4". Ofcom confirmed that Price issued a complaint and accordingly launched an investigation into the programme. In April 2011, Ofcom ruled Channel 4 had breached broadcasting rules by transmitting the material in question but did not require the network to broadcast an apology saying that it was an "erroneous decision on a matter of editorial judgment on the broadcaster's part". Price criticised the decision not to require a broadcast apology.

Boyle discussed the material onstage at a charity gig some months later, saying that the joke was intended to highlight how Price exploited her son, and that he felt the two aspects of Price's media profile, "her disabled son and her sexuality", did not belong together. He rejected comments that the joke may have led to playground bullying, saying that "I find it hard to believe there are kids at that school who would like to slag Harvey, but can't think of an angle".

=== Allegations of racism and consequent libel action ===
In July 2011, the Daily Mirror published an article strongly criticising Boyle which alleged he had been forced to quit Mock the Week and described him as a "racist comedian". Boyle, in response, sued the Mirror for libel. In October 2012, a jury found in his favour, ordering the Mirror to pay him £54,650 in damages, which he donated to charity.

=== Rape jokes ===
In 2012, Boyle posted a tweet about Olympic cyclist Victoria Pendleton, saying that it was sexy that while she could lift twice her own weight, she still couldn't throw him off her. This was condemned by the End Violence Against Women Coalition. In 2022, Boyle joked about whether he would rape television host Holly Willoughby before or after killing her. Conservative MP Caroline Nokes strongly criticised Boyle's use of rape as a subject for jokes. Addressing the controversy relating to the Holly Willoughby joke, Boyle argued that the joke "was part of a very long routine about whether or not it’s OK to do a joke about that" and that the routine "concludes that certain jokes are probably a product of toxic masculinity".

=== Give It Up for Comic Relief ===
On 6 March 2013, Boyle caused controversy when he was invited to perform at Russell Brand's BBC Three fundraiser Give It Up for Comic Relief at Wembley Arena. He made a series of jokes about Comic Relief itself; Queen Elizabeth II; Catherine, Duchess of Cambridge; Andy Serkis; Oscar Pistorius; Pope Benedict XVI and the Jimmy Savile sexual abuse scandal. This was deemed so distasteful that his entire six-minute performance was cut out of the broadcast version of the 3.5-hour show.
