= Frankie Boyle's Tour of Scotland =

BBC travel documentary series

- Genre: Travel documentary
- Presented by: Frankie Boyle
- Country of origin: Scotland
- Original language: English
- No. of series: 1
- No. of episodes: 4

Production
- Running time: 30 minutes
- Production company: Two Rivers

Original release
- Network: BBC Two
- Release: 7 February – 28 February 2020

Frankie Boyle's Tour of Scotland is a 2020 travel documentary series that aired on BBC Two. Consisting of four half-hour episodes, the programme was nominated for a British Academy Scotland Awards (BAFTA) Award.

== Production ==
Boyle had previously done a travel documentary for the 2018 FIFA World Cup, Frankie Goes to Russia. The show was announced in July 2019, to be produced by Two Rivers. The programme aired on BBC Two in a Friday 10 p.m. timeslot. The stand-up routine shown in the documentary was released under the title Frankie Boyle Live: Excited For You To See And Hate This in July 2020. Produced by Two Rivers, it was shown on BBC Two.

== Episodes ==
No.	Title	Original release date
1	"Aberdeen to Oban"	7 February 2020
Boyle meets a hermit, tours a commune, talks about Scottish land reform with Andy Wightman and visits a hydroelectric power station.
2	"Edinburgh to Aberdeen"	14 February 2020
Boyle speaks to the rapper Loki and the crime writer Val McDermid, attends a lesson in a Scottish prison about Scottish language and dialect and talks to Catherine King—a sign language interpreter—before she interprets a live show for Boyle.
3	"Glasgow to Ayr"	21 February 2020
Boyle meets his former Jeet Kune Do instructor for another lesson, talks to a historian about Mary, Queen of Scots, converses with the refugee activist Amal Azzudin and tours a fairground.
4	"Oban to Glasgow"	28 February 2020
Boyle talks to comic book writer Grant Morrison, learns about battle re-enactment, joins artists working on a mural and talks to a Glasgow councillor about the city's association with slavery in British colonies.

== Reception ==
The series was nominated for a British Academy Scotland Awards (BAFTA) Award in the category of Factual Series.

Lucy Mangan of The Guardian rated the series four stars out of five, saying that despite very rarely laughing out loud at television, she "belly-laughed throughout". Mangan praised Boyle as a "good guide, sufficiently engaged and detached at the same time". In another four star review, The Herald's Alison Rowat reviewed the first episode positively, calling Boyle "a pugnacious sort but a surprisingly good interviewer".
