= A Long Time Coming =

Studio album by Wayne Brady
- Released: September 16, 2008
- Recorded: 2008 in Beverly Hills, California, United States
- Genre: Contemporary R&B
- Length: 43:53
- Label: Peak/Concord
- Producer: Wayne Brady

Wayne Brady chronology
A Long Time Coming (2008)	Radio Wayne (2011)

Singles from A Long Time Coming
- 1. "Ordinary" Released: 2008

Professional ratings
Review scores
Source	Rating
AllMusic	3.5/5 stars
PopSyndicate	4.5/5 stars
Toronto Star	3/4 stars

A Long Time Coming is the debut studio album by Emmy award-winning actor and comedian, Wayne Brady. It was released on September 16, 2008. It spawned one single, "Ordinary". It debuted at #183 on the Billboard 200 and #30 on the Top R&B/Hip-Hop Albums chart on October 4, 2008, but five weeks later, it went up on the Top R&B/Hip-Hop Albums, peaking at #20 and making a re-entry on the Billboard 200 at #157.

== Track listing ==
No.	Title	Writer(s)	Length
1.	"Ordinary"	Jack Kugell; Sarah Nagourney	3:23
2.	"F.W.B."	Brady; Kugell; Jason Pennock	4:06
3.	"Can't Buy Me Love"	John Lennon; Paul McCartney	3:21
4.	"Back in the Day"	Brady; Kugell	3:21
5.	"Sweetest Berry"	Jamey Jaz	4:18
6.	"A Change Is Gonna Come"	Sam Cooke	3:10
7.	"I Ain't Movin'"	Brady; Kugell; Pennock	3:14
8.	"Make Heaven Wait"	Martin Kember; Kugell; Pennock	3:54
9.	"All Naturally"	Kugell; Pennock	3:40
10.	"All I Do"	Morris Broadnax; Clarence Paul; Stevie Wonder	4:25
11.	"Beautiful Ugly"	Steve Kipner; Kugell; Pennock	3:20
12.	"You and Me"	Brady; Pennock	3:41
Total length:			43:53

== Chart positions ==
Chart (2008)	Peak position
US Billboard 200	157
US Top R&B/Hip-Hop Albums (Billboard)	20
US Heatseekers Albums (Billboard)	2
