= Radio Wayne =

Studio album by Wayne Brady
- Released: April 19, 2011 (Amazon.com); May 31, 2011
- Genres: Children's music, R&B
- Label: Walt Disney

Wayne Brady chronology
A Long Time Coming (2008)	Radio Wayne (2011)

Radio Wayne is the second studio album by actor and comedian Wayne Brady. It is also his first full-length children's music album, his second Disney-labeled album after his recording of "The Tiki Tiki Tiki Room" for the Disney Music Block Party (2008) compilation, and his third children's album appearance after Marlo Thomas & Friends: Thanks & Giving All Year Long and Disney Music Block Party. The album's title was inspired by the radio network Radio Disney.

== Reception ==
Professional ratings
Review scores
Source	Rating
Allmusic	2.5/5 stars
Common Sense Media	4/5 stars
Parenthood.com	(Positive)

Common Sense Media gave the album 4/5 stars and said the "album teaches kids all about manners, good behavior, hygiene, and eating vegetables, but in a way that's so fun and danceable that kids may not even realize that they're learning".

== Track listing ==
All tracks are written by Wayne Brady, Jamie Jones, Jack Kugell, and Jason Pennock, except where noted.

No.	Title	Length
1.	"Imagination"	3:46
2.	"The High-Low"	3:29
3.	"Good Morning (All Over the World)"	2:45
4.	"Say Please"	3:11
5.	"Talk to the Animals" (Leslie Bricusse)	2:57
6.	"Greedy Gus"	2:51
7.	"Let It Out"	3:08
8.	"Reading Can Be Fun"	3:22
9.	"Wash Your Hands"	3:50
10.	"You Are What You Eat"	3:17
11.	"The Music Song"	3:28
12.	"Hide and Seek"	2:57
13.	"Monster in My Closet"	3:05
14.	"Hip Hop Stop"	3:35
