= Rush Hour (British TV series) =

British comedy sketch television show

- Genre: Sketch comedy
- Created by: Charlie Brooker
- Starring: Adam Buxton; Sanjeev Kohli; Miranda Hart; Frankie Boyle; David Armand; Marek Larwood; Kerry Godliman; Bruce Mackinnon; Naomi Bentley; Lorna Watson; Katy Wix
- Country of origin: United Kingdom
- Original language: English
- No. of seasons: 1
- No. of episodes: 6

Production
- Running time: 6x30 minutes

Original release
- Network: BBC Three
- Release: 19 March – 21 April 2007

Rush Hour is a sketch show made by Zeppotron and shown on BBC Three during March and April 2007. The show featured several sketches centred on characters travelling to work, school or otherwise, therefore many of the sketches took place inside a car or bus. Several cult and up and coming comedians and comic actors star in the show, each performing several of the characters. The cast includes Adam Buxton, Sanjeev Kohli, Miranda Hart, Frankie Boyle, David Armand, Marek Larwood, Kerry Godliman, Bruce Mackinnon, Naomi Bentley, Lorna Watson, and Katy Wix.
