= We Are Klang =

British sketch comedy television series

- Directed by: Ben Kellett
- Starring: Greg Davies; Steve Hall; Marek Larwood
- Country of origin: United Kingdom
- Original language: English
- No. of series: 1
- No. of episodes: 6

Production
- Production location: Stalybridge
- Camera setup: Multi-camera
- Running time: 29 minutes

Original release
- Network: BBC Three
- Release: 30 July – 3 September 2009

We Are Klang is a British comedy sketch show, starring Greg Davies, Steve Hall and Marek Larwood, and produced for BBC Three. The programme was short-lived, only running for six episodes in 2009, between 30 July to 10 September, and focused on the antics of the three as town council members for the fictional town of Klangbury, often having to deal with a serious problem that would result in them being fired if not resolved. The show frequently involved adult comedy with an anarchic style in presentation, which had won the group – operating as a three-piece comedy sketch group of the same name – notable acclaim for their stage performances.

In 2010, the group attempted to launch a new variety show called "The Klang Show", following the conclusion of We Are Klang, but only a pilot was ever created which aired on 16 August 2010 on BBC Three.

== Premise ==
We Are Klang focuses on the lives of Greg Davies, Steve Hall and Marek Larwood as town council members of Klangbury – a fictional town, whose locations were filmed within Stalybridge, eight miles east of Manchester – each of whom had different roles. While Davies was the Deputy Mayor, Steve was in charge of Health and Safety and frequently caused more problems, and Marek was a dim-witted assistant who frequently is tormented for making up stupid ideas. All three face a problem in each episode that they have to solve for the town's mayor, or risk being fired for failing. Solving such problems often involved methods that would not always work well or go wrong, but with the trio often eventually resolving the issue in time to the satisfaction of the mayor. Episodes often involved several characters that inhabited Klangbury, each played by one of the three, featured at least one song the group performed, and featured a sketch that would involve members of the programme's studio audience (referred to as the "Department of Audience") partaking in it.

=== Cast ===
The show's regular cast consisted of:

- Greg Davies
- Marek Larwood
- Steve Hall
- Debbie Chazen as the Mayor of Klangbury
- David Ward as Leslie, the Mayor's assistant

The show also featured appearances by Lorna Watson and Sally Harrison, while Ainsley Harriott appeared as himself during one episode.

== Episodes ==
No.	Title	Directed by	Written by	Original release date
1	"Fire"	Ben Kellett	Greg Davies, Steve Hall & Marek Larwood	30 July 2009
The trio find themselves forming a new fire department for Klangbury, when they accidentally disband the town's old one. But with the council budget totalling only a pitiful £1, the boys find themselves organising a fundraiser to raise the money they need to save their jobs.
2	"Crime"	Ben Kellett	Greg Davies, Steve Hall & Marek Larwood	6 August 2009
An elusive thief cleans out the council office and wreaks havoc around town with his light-fingered antics, even stealing the entire town's police force. The gang quickly turn detective to track down the culprit and recover his swag, including the Mayor's wig, by launching a crime-busting initiative.
3	"Inspection"	Ben Kellett	Greg Davies, Steve Hall & Marek Larwood	13 August 2009
It's Valentine's Day, and Greg is pining for a lady friend to share his love of cake with. While Steve and Marek try to find him a date, the Mayor orders the gang to clean up their council office before an inspection takes place on the same day.
4	"Tourism"	Ben Kellett	Greg Davies, Steve Hall & Marek Larwood	20 August 2009
The Annual Small Town of the Year competition is looming, and Klangbury's rival, town Midford-on-Sea, is hot favourite to grab the gong. It looks hopeless, until the trio spot the opportunity of a lifetime when a rich Hungarian prince arrives in town looking to spend a lot of money.
5	"Election"	Ben Kellett	Greg Davies, Steve Hall & Marek Larwood	27 August 2009
The Mayor is battling for re-election against the people's favourite, Barry O'Charmer, so the gang get to work, hitting the campaign trail to ensure that she wins. Guest appearance by Ainsley Harriott
6	"Alien"	Ben Kellett	Greg Davies, Steve Hall & Marek Larwood	3 September 2009
The Klangbury Centenary Parade looms, and the gang become entrusted with immortalising the memories of the town in a time capsule. But three villainous aliens from the planet Klung arrive, and mayhem and chaos soon follow.
