= Zoe Gardner =

British actress

Zoe Gardner is a comedy writer and actress in television, radio, and theatre.

== Career ==
Gardner's television works include Mongrels (BBC Three) 2010, Ideal (BBC Two) 2009, Katy Brand's Big Ass Show, (ITV2) 2008/09, Cowards (BBC Four) 2008, Comedy Shuffle (BBC Three) 2007, 28 Acts in 28 Minutes (BBC Three) 2007, The Slammer (CBBC) 2006, Meet The Blogs (Mersey Television), 2006, and Comedy Cuts (Granada for ITV2) 2007. Gardner recorded a TV pilot based on their live Congress shows for Celador Productions.

Gardner wrote and performed her own solo show entitled Zoe Gardner's Fault at the 2008 Edinburgh Festival Fringe. Theatre credits include Coffee, a play by Glyn Cannon and Colin Hoult's Carnival of Monsters, both at the 2009 Edinburgh Festival Fringe. In 2010 Gardner performed in Hoult's second solo show Enemy of the World and her own show An Hour of Telly Live alongside Margaret Cabourn-Smith both at the Edinburgh Festival. Gardner returned to the Edinburgh Festival in 2011 performing in a play, Lights, Camera, Walkies by Tom Glover and Colin Hoult's third Edinburgh solo outing entitled Inferno.

Gardner is half of the comedy team The Congress of Oddities.
