= Meantime (novel) =

2022 novel by Frankie Boyle

- First edition cover
- Author: Frankie Boyle
- Language: English
- Genre: Crime fiction
- Publisher: Baskerville
- Publication date: 21 July 2022
- Publication place: United Kingdom
- Media type: Print; ebook; audiobook
- Pages: 356
- ISBN: 9781399801157
- Dewey Decimal: 823.92

Meantime is a 2022 crime fiction novel by the Scottish comedian Frankie Boyle. The story follows drug addict Felix McAveety's unfocused investigation into his friend Marina's death. It is set in Glasgow, Scotland, shortly after the 2014 independence referendum. Felix is aided by the crime fiction writer Jane, the left-wing activist Amy and his depressed neighbour Donnie. They meet Chong, who seems to believe reality is simulated, and find signs that British Intelligence are involved in Marina's death.

Though he had written non-fiction before, Meantime was Boyle's first novel; he wrote parts of the novel in hotels after stand-up performances and while wandering his hometown Glasgow. The book was published by Baskerville, a new crime fiction imprint of John Murray, on 21 July 2022. It was nominated for Bloody Scotland's Debut of the Year award.

Reviewers found that the novel's plot was of secondary importance to its social and political commentary, including Scotland's role in colonialism and capitalism and the nature of Scottish identity. Critics largely praised Boyle's comedic dialogue, his descriptions of Glasgow and its inhabitants, and the revelations of what led to Felix's drug dependence. However, some reviewers criticised the plot as unfocused and that some digressions are excessive or read like Boyle is directly expressing his thoughts.

== Background ==
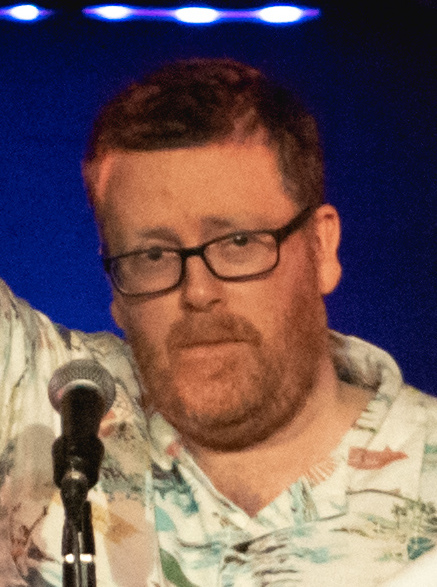
Author and comedian Frankie Boyle

Frankie Boyle is a Scottish comedian, aged 49 at the time of the book's release. Meantime was Boyle's first fiction book, though he had previously authored four non-fiction works: the autobiography My Shit Life So Far (2009); a collection of his columns from The Sun titled Work! Consume! Die! (2011); a political comedy book, Scotland's Jesus (2013); and a political essay, The Future of British Politics (2020).

Crime writer James Ellroy was one of Boyle's favourite authors and Boyle had been a longstanding reader of the genre. Boyle experimented writing with a narrative voice, not initially planning to write a book, and discovered interest in a detective character. Not constrained to rely on the book for income, Boyle tried to recreate styles that he enjoyed reading. Boyle worked on the book while in hotel rooms after stand-up routines, unable to sleep due to adrenaline. He also wrote on his phone while wandering around Glasgow, where he lived and the book was set. He joked that he was "very keen on not going mad during a lockdown, and writing the book really helped with that"; Laura Wilson of The Guardian noted a proliferation of crime fiction by male celebrities written during COVID-19 lockdowns.

Boyle said at the Edinburgh Book Festival in 2022: "I would much rather, if I could, segue into writing novels and just stay in the house and not travel so much". He said of writing, in comparison to stand-up comedy, that "you don't have to go and sell it to people". However, he said that writing fiction was "equally difficult", and believed it was a myth that celebrities can automatically get their books published. Boyle said on Twitter in September 2022 that he planned to begin writing a second novel over Christmas.

== Characters ==
The novel is narrated through the main character, Felix McAveety. Andrew Anthony of The Observer commented that though Felix—like Boyle—is white, straight and male, few other characters in the book are.

- Felix McAveety – a Glaswegian in his 30s and former BBC Scotland employee. He is addicted to drugs and alcohol, particularly Valium.
- Marina Katos – Felix's murdered friend, a graduate of Princeton University who was recently employed for the artificial intelligence company Beloved Intelligence while working at a Mexican bar, the Go-Go.
- Amy McGarvey – a left-wing activist who Felix starts a relationship with after Marina's death.
- Jane Pickford – a successful crime fiction writer and ex-cop. She is dying of cancer and in love with a married woman, Ginny.
- Donnie Wilson – Felix's depressed downstairs roommate, whose marriage is ending after his wife cheated on him. Though claiming to be a teacher, he is an undercover cop.
- Docherty – an activist who Felix remembers from his bizarre scripts that he pitched to BBC Scotland.
- David Chong – a GP and drug dealer associated with Marina and obsessed with the idea that the universe is simulated.
- Rachael O'Connor – a delusional stalker who formerly pursued Felix and is currently obsessed with a man named Greg.
- Fatima – Marina's former roommate. Though a drug addict when Felix knew her, she quit through Narcotics Anonymous.
- Mikey – the manager of the Go-Go, who is in a relationship with the Scottish National Party (SNP) politician Gary Mount to gather intelligence for the British government.
- Agent Jeremiah Brond – a threatening figure who shares a resemblance to the actor Gerard Butler. Brond is Mikey's handler and monitors Mount as well as Felix and Jane's activities.
- Gary Mount – an SNP politician who has been surveilled by the British government since receiving a large amount of classified information as a journalist.

== Plot ==
In 2015 Glasgow, police question Felix McAveety over the murder of his friend Marina. They had met at her workplace, the Mexican bar Go-Go. Marina left him a £10,000 cheque; deciding to investigate her murder, he speaks to the Go-Go manager, Mikey. Felix discovers a diazepam box in Marina's apartment labelled with her GP's name, David Chong. Chong, fascinated by the idea that reality is a computer simulation, followed Marina's research for the artificial intelligence company Beloved Intelligence.

Marina was involved in Alternative Independence, a left-wing movement for Scottish independence in the 2014 referendum. At an Alternative Independence event, Felix meets the activist Amy and they have sex. The next day, at Jane Pickford's book signing, Felix bumps into an ex-stalker – Rachael – and convinces Jane to investigate Marina's death.

Fatima – Marina's ex-roommate – believes Chong monitored Marina's digital communication. After consuming a dangerous drug cocktail, Felix interviews for a job at Beloved Intelligence under an alias. May, Marina's flatmate, tells Felix of her controlling relationship with Malcolm, a Large Hadron Collider conspiracy theorist. Donnie drives Felix to meet Healing Hands charity workers that Marina volunteered with, but the pair aggravate Mary and Matt to the extent that a fight breaks out.

Mikey admits to stealing £140,000 from the drug dealer 'The Vole', after finding drug mules for him. He began co-operating with the government, with Agent Brond as his handler; at their request he began a sexual relationship with the SNP politician Gary Mount. Rachael is killed, leading to Felix's second police interrogation. He spent £2,000 of his money from Marina with Donnie on a suitcase of assorted drugs. His flat is searched, but Donnie has traded the drugs for cocaine he is storing in his gym locker. Jane hypothesises that Chong is licensed by British Intelligence. Jane and Felix confront Chong in his garden. He denies killing Marina, but not his role in the drugs trade. Rachael's last stalking victim, Greg, shows Felix her Twitter account. Greg works as an art therapist to satisfy his much younger girlfriend.

Docherty creates a distraction at a Burns supper charity event so Jane and Felix can meet Mount, but Brond takes them aside instead. Felix taxis away with Tom and Sophie from Beloved Intelligence, who give him information on Chong and Marina. The next day, Mount tells Felix that while running a campaigning magazine he was sent a large amount of classified information. As leverage, Brond positioned Mount as prime suspect in Marina's murder, and killed the witness Rachael. After speaking to Felix, Mount kills himself.

Sophie tells Felix that Donnie is an undercover cop. Donnie confesses to being an anarchist infiltrating the police, then a police officer infiltrating environmental activists. Donnie is killed and Amy and Felix are kidnapped by Agent Brond.

Felix recalls meeting Amy at the University of Glasgow. They dated and she became pregnant. They bought the flat that Felix still lives in and raised Danny, who died in early childhood of meningitis. To numb himself, Felix became dependent on Valium. They broke up after Amy cheated on him, but a few months before the Alternative Independence event, they started having sex, pretending they were strangers in a one-night stand.

Felix and Amy laugh hysterically as Brond threatens to make them suffer. An associate of Brond stabs Amy in the shoulder as she realises he killed Marina. Jane convinces Chong to spare them. She reveals Brond and Chong's plan – discovering Felix's closeness to Marina, they sent Donnie to live in his building. When Felix investigated Marina's murder, they planned for him to overdose on Donnie's drugs or be framed for intent to supply, then for him to be killed by Matt and Mary – who were given drugs and told someone was trying to kill them. Brond comes for Jane and Felix, in Jane's apartment. Felix is shot in the chest and Jane kills Brond with a blade concealed in her walking cane.

Eight months later, Jane sees Ginny—a married woman she is in love with—on her deathbed. Amy is three months pregnant and in a relationship with her physiotherapist. Felix shared cash from Donnie's gym locker with Mikey. He is dating Fatima and works at the Go-Go. He attends Narcotics Anonymous.

== Analysis ==
Scottish history, identity, and independence are key themes of Meantime.

The narrator Felix is dependent on drugs and alcohol: Boyle thought this would fit with the digressive style that he had enjoyed reading, such as in White Noise (1985) by Don DeLillo. Felix's lack of confidence in his views, Boyle said, allows detours into commentary on society and culture. An alcoholic, Boyle went sober at the age of 26. He has also used drugs, saying that he wrote My Shit Life So Far while high on MDMA. John Dugdale of The Times compared Meantime to the book Inherent Vice (2009) by Thomas Pynchon, which features a cannabis-consuming detective and mixes crime fiction with political satire. The Guardian critic Stephanie Merritt was reminded of the black comedy film Withnail and I (1987). Boyle's writing was also compared, by Merritt, to the crime fiction writers William McIlvanney and Mick Herron.

Reviewers found that the plot is of secondary importance to the novel's social commentary. It explores a post-referendum "battleground" over what it means to be Scottish or British. The novel is set in the aftermath of the 2014 Scottish independence referendum and also explores Scotland's role in colonialism. Social commentary includes criticism of capitalism and liberalism. Jake Kerridge of The Daily Telegraph found that—similar to Raymond Chandler's novels—atmosphere-building, misanthropic jokes and social commentary are prioritised over plot and the message is not nihilistic as Felix is not amoral.

Merritt described it as noir fiction. Anthony said that Meantime is dense with similes that are "caustic and often surreal"; Boyle identified a stylistic overlap between detective fiction and insult comedy. Chortle commented that jokes from Meantime are used by Boyle in his stand-up comedy. Dugdale analysed that most of the violence or danger faced by Felix is played as black comedy. The book, according to Dugdale, had elements of whodunit fiction and some content resembles a stand-up comedy monologue.

The Scotsman's Stuart Kelly said that the name Felix, meaning "happy" or "lucky", is chosen because Felix is neither, though he is good-hearted; as Felix is a Catholic, it could be a reference to felix culpa—the positive outcomes of the fall of man. The character, wrote Chortle, is "nihilistic and pessimistic" but "good-natured" and does not aim to harm others.

== Publication ==
The publisher John Murray announced they had purchased the rights to Meantime in October 2021. Baskerville, its crime fiction and thriller imprint, announced that Meantime would be one of its first major titles at its 2022 launch. Starting a week before release, Baskerville advertised for the book in public spaces in Edinburgh, Glasgow and London. As promotion, Boyle appeared on the talk show The Last Leg and spoke at the Off the Shelf Festival, Aye Write, the Edinburgh International Book Festival and Bloody Scotland. The book was published on 21 July 2022. Chris Reilly narrated the audiobook.

== Reception ==
The book was nominated for Bloody Scotland's Debut of the Year award for crime writing, but lost to Welcome to Cooper (2021) by Tariq Ashkanani. The Guardian's Wilson found that Meantime, a "funny and moving" novel, was the "most impressive" celebrity crime fiction of the year. The Times named it August's Book of the Month in the thriller genre, with Dugdale praising the "scintillating sentences and perfect lines of dialogue".

In a four-star review for The Daily Telegraph, Kerridge praised that the author "regularly deploys the beautifully offbeat imagery that characterises the best of his stand-up", and wrote that he could hear Boyle in his head as the narrator. However, he commented negatively on the coherency of the plot. Another four-star review came from Martin Chilton in The Independent. Chilton said that Meantime "blazes with the sort of edgy, near-the-knuckle humour that has made Boyle such a popular comedian", with "spiky, challenging" social commentary and many "thought-provoking reflections". Chilton praised the plot twists, the villains and the novel's climax, but found that some of the novel read too much like Boyle's closing monologues on the programme Frankie Boyle's New World Order. Chilton preferred the "clever descriptions" over the "shock-value ones" and said that the novel succeeds as Felix is "transfixing, sharp-witted and slightly horrifying".

In a 3.5 star review, a Chortle critic found that the author created a realistic environment, with "expressive, almost poetic, descriptions of Glasgow life in all its forms" and "sympathy towards his characters" that the reader will share. Though enjoying some digressions, the reviewer saw much of it as "self-indulgent", including the simulation theory that is given much emphasis and "bafflingly explored" through a fictional pitch to BBC Scotland.

Tanya Sweeney of the Irish Independent recommended the book as a "very charming, enjoyable read" that incorporates Boyle's "playful, shocking, smart" comedic style. Sweeney praised the dialogue found that the author wrote in a "nuanced and deft" style, particularly in his descriptions of Glaswegians such as Donnie, who is characterised "with an impressive economy of prose". She reviewed that "Felix's gimlet outlook on life is brilliantly off-kilter" and changing emotional tone when his life history is unraveled is handled well. However, Sweeney found that it is "occasionally hard not to think of the novel as a vessel in which the writer has emptied some of his more cynical observations".

Merritt praised it as "enjoyably dark and entertaining". Highlighting the writing style, Merritt found that Boyle was accomplished with his dialogue and wordplay, but a "great affectation for Glasgow ... gives the novel not just wit but heart". Merritt also lauded the "well-aimed, drive-by satirical shots at political targets". Kelly gave a mixed review, questioning why Boyle wrote a fiction book when he could have been "far more piercing and precise" in non-fiction and whether the characters are just "ventriloquist's puppets" for Boyle's thoughts. However, he praised Chong's dialogue on Chinese stereotypes and British imperialism as the best monologue in the book and found the history of Felix's addiction "remarkably moving" as it provides "pathos that overrides the usual sarcasm and snarl".

== Television adaptation ==
Meantime is being adapted into a television series for Sky One, with James McAvoy set to star.
