= Rhys James =

British comedian (born 1991)

- James in 2026
- Born: 30 April 1991 (age 35); Swindon, Wiltshire, England
- Education: University of Manchester
- Occupation: Comedian
- Years active: 2008–present
- Website: rhysjames.co.uk

Rhys James (born 30 April 1991) is a British stand-up comedian. James has appeared on Mock the Week and Live at the Apollo.

== Personal life ==
James studied for a politics and international relations degree at Manchester University, starting his stand-up career in 2010 whilst still a student. He supports Tottenham Hotspur football club.

== Career ==
James has appeared on Mock the Week, becoming a regular panelist upon the show's revival in 2026, Russell Howard's Stand Up Central, @elevenish, Virtually Famous and Sweat the Small Stuff. In 2010 he performed as part of the Pleasance Comedy Reserve at the Edinburgh Fringe, was a finalist in the Laughing Boy New Act Competition and placed 3rd in 'Comedy Central's Funniest Student'. James also appeared on certain YouTube channels such as The Football Republic (Top 10 Football F*ck Up's) and Spurred On. In 2022, he was a guest host on Ed Gamble and Matthew Crosby's Radio X show.

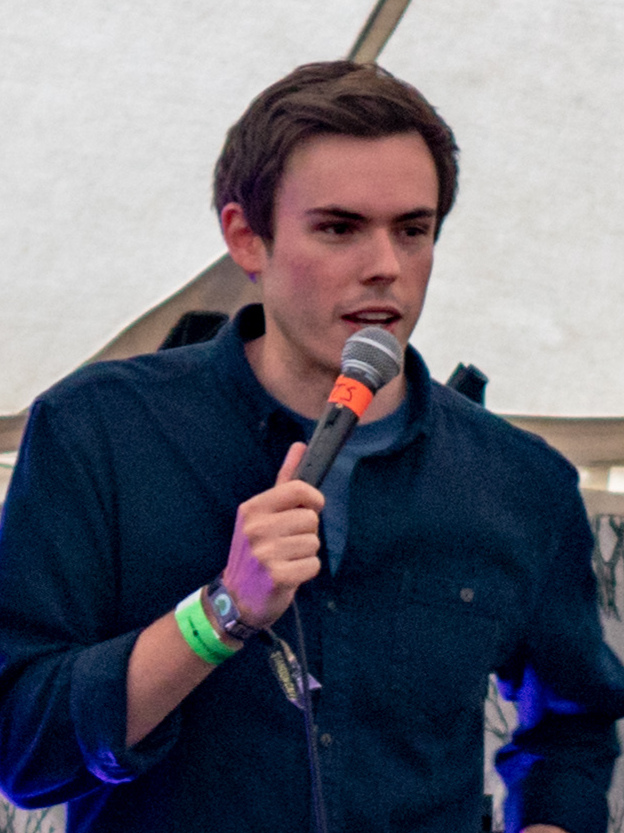
James in 2018

In 2019, James embarked on his first nationwide tour Snitch, which was completed in 2021 after delays due to the COVID-19 pandemic. He has also appeared on The Great American Joke Off on The CW, as one of the panel of six comedians performing in 2023. James' first book, titled You'll Like It When You Get There, was published in August 2025.

James names Jimmy Carr, Demetri Martin and Louis C.K. as some of his favourite comics.

=== Live shows ===
- Begins (2014)
- Remains (2015)
- Forgives (2016)
- Snitch (2019–2021)
- Spilt Milk (2023)
- Chop Logic (2026-2027)

=== Podcasts ===
James has been featured on numerous podcasts, including Brett Goldstein's Films To Be Buried With and Jamie Laing's Private Parts.

In 2020, James began hosting a podcast called Early Work which featured conversations with performers about their early creative material.

In 2022, James started hosting Fit & Proper alongside Lloyd Griffith. This podcast sees a weekly guest hypothetically rebuild a football club of their choosing.

=== Television ===
Title	Year
Seann Walsh's Late Night Comedy Spectacular	2014
Sweat the Small Stuff	2014–2015
Virtually Famous	2015
@elevenish	2016
The Chris Ramsey Show	2017
Soho Theatre Live	2017
When News Goes Horribly Wrong	2018
Comedy Central at the Comedy Store	2018
The Premier League Show	2018
Alan Carr's Christmas Cracker	2018
Roast Battle	2019
Live at the Apollo	2019
Soccer AM	2018–2020
Love Island: Aftersun	2020
Comedians: Home Alone	2020
The Lock Inn Pub Quiz	2020
A League of Their Own	2020
Comedy Game Night	2020
Richard Osman's House of Games	2020, 2025
Pointless Celebrities	2021
Celebrity Mastermind	2021
Guessable	2021–2022
Comedians Giving Lectures	2022
Mock the Week	2016–
The Weakest Link	2023
Out of Order	2024
The Hit List	2026
Unacceptable	2026
