= Marek Larwood =

English comedian and actor

- Born: Marek Ryan Larwood; 2 June 1976 (age 50); Norwich, Norfolk, England

Comedy career
- Medium: Stand-up, television
- Genres: Observational comedy Sketch comedy
- Subject: Everyday life

Marek Ryan Larwood (born 2 June 1976) is an English comedian, actor and YouTuber. He is best known for the BBC Three sketch show Rush Hour and for being one third of the comedy trio We Are Klang.

== Early life ==
Born in Norwich, Norfolk, Larwood lived in Wales before moving to the Isle of Wight. His forename is of Polish origin, as his mother had seen a 1975 documentary about a Polish schoolboy with a heart defect, who was looking forward to an operation. The operation was unsuccessful, and Marek's mother thought to name her son after the Polish schoolboy.

== Career ==
=== Stand-up comedy ===
Larwood won the Laughing Horse New Act of the Year competition in 2003. He was part of the comic trio We Are Klang, along with Steve Hall and Greg Davies. They took their show Klangbang to the 2006 Edinburgh Fringe festival and were nominated for the Edinburgh Comedy Awards. He performed his debut solo show, Typecast, in 2012.

=== Television ===
Larwood has appeared in the sitcom Extras and the BBC sci-fi sitcom Hyperdrive. He featured as a main cast member of the first series of the CBBC show Sorry, I've Got No Head, but was absent from the second, meaning some of his characters were recast. He made a surprise return for the third series, but did not reclaim his original roles except for the 'Advice Man'. In 2007, he appeared as Giacomo Casanova and Milo of Croton in CBBC's Ed and Oucho.

Larwood appeared in the 2008 ITV2 sketch show Laura, Ben & Him, with Laura Solon and Ben Willbond. He appeared in the sitcom adaptation of We Are Klang, the sketch show Rush Hour, and the improv game show Fast and Loose. From 2012 to 2014, he was a member of the BBC Three hidden camera comedy show Impractical Jokers UK.

He plays pub regular Lee in Romesh Ranganathan's sitcom The Reluctant Landlord. Larwood appeared in ITV2's celebrity comedy show CelebAbility, alongside comedian Iain Stirling and Scarlett Moffat.

=== Films ===
Larwood made a cameo appearance as an amateur magician in the 2007 film Magicians.

=== Online ===
Larwood has regularly made content on YouTube. He has both his personal channel with sketches, and The Cool Dudes Walking Club, where he chronicles walks around the UK.

He also presented a weekly podcast on classic and current films, Film Fandango, with fellow comedians David Reed and Danielle Ward. He then presented his own podcast Marek Makes a Movie.

== Credits ==
=== Television ===
Year	Title	Role	Notes
2006	Extras	Autograph Hunter	
2007	Hyperdrive	Amorf Spets	
2007	Rush Hour		
2008–2011	Sorry, I've Got No Head	Numerous roles	
2009	We Are Klang	Marek	Also wrote 6 episodes
2010	Little’s Howard’s Big Question	The Undertaker	Series 2 Episode 10 “Why Do Things Have to Die?”
2011	Fast and Loose	Himself	5 episodes
2012–2016	Impractical Jokers UK	Himself	
2015–2017	Drunk History	Hawley Harvey Crippen	
2018–2019	The Reluctant Landlord	Lee	
2022–2024	The Stand Up Sketch Show	Ensemble role	10 episodes
2022–2025	Am I Being Unreasonable?		3 episodes
2023	Black Ops	Police Officer	Series 1 Episode 3
