= Rebecca O'Neal =

American comedian and writer

Rebecca O'Neal (born 1987) is an American comedian and writer. She gained prominence performing stand-up comedy in her hometown of Chicago. O'Neal was featured on an episode of Comedy Central Stand-Up Featuring, 2 Dope Queens, and Easy.

== Life and career ==
O'Neal was born and raised on the southwest side of Chicago. She was raised in an Evangelical Christian household.

After high school she enrolled at Columbia College Chicago and later dropped out, after which she worked as an event promoter for local rappers and music artists.

She started her comedy career as a writer for outlets such as Splitsider, Gawker, Vanity Fair, and BuzzFeed. In 2012, she transitioned to performing stand-up and began performing at open mic night at Cole's in Chicago. After she became a steady performer, she hosted shows at Cole's, the Laugh Factory, and a comedy special on WCIU. Her sets span a range of topics such as fashion, pop culture, sex, and quantum particle theories. She also tests material out on her Twitter account.

O'Neal opened shows for and toured with Maria Bamford, Janeane Garofalo, Arsenio Hall, Hannibal Buress, Roy Wood Jr., Michael Che, and W. Kamau Bell, and also performed at the Bridgetown Comedy Festival. In 2016, she quit her day job to pursue comedy full-time. That year, she headlined a show at the Laugh Factory where she hosted several shows a week.

In 2017, O'Neal relocated to Brooklyn, New York. She was on an episode of Netflix's Easy performing as herself, and she was also featured on the HBO series 2 Dope Queens. In 2020 and 2022, O'Neal was a featured comic on Comedy Central Stand-Up Featuring.

== Personal life ==
O'Neal is queer. She resides in Brooklyn.
