= Ordinary (Wayne Brady song) =

Single by Wayne Brady

from the album A Long Time Coming
- Released: August 19, 2008
- Recorded: 2008 in Beverly Hills, California, United States
- Genre: Contemporary R&B, Soul
- Length: 3:23
- Label: Peak/Concord
- Songwriter(s): Jamie Jones, Jack Kugell, Sarah Nagourney, Jason Pennock, Welford B. Walton II

Wayne Brady singles chronology
"Beautiful" (2005)	"Ordinary" (2008)	"F.W.B." (2009)

"Ordinary" is the first single released off Wayne Brady's first album, A Long Time Coming released on August 19, 2008, peaking at number 41 on the Billboard Hot R&B/Hip-Hop Songs chart.

This song originally recorded in 2005 by TVXQ'S Beautiful Life for their album Rising Sun

== Chart positions ==
Chart (2008)	Peak position
U.S. Billboard Hot Adult Contemporary Tracks	26
U.S. Billboard Hot R&B/Hip-Hop Songs	41
U.S. Billboard Smooth Jazz Songs	9
