= Wayne Brady =

American TV host and actor (born 1972)

- Brady in 2026
- Born: Wayne Alphonso Brady; June 2, 1972 (age 54); Columbus, Georgia, U.S.
- Occupations: Television host; comedian; actor; singer
- Years active: 1990–present
- Television: Let's Make a Deal; The Wayne Brady Show; Whose Line Is It Anyway?
- Spouses: Diana Lasso (m. 1993; div. 1995); Mandie Taketa (m. 1999; div. 2008)
- Children: 2

Wayne Alphonso Brady (born June 2, 1972) is an American comedian, actor, and singer. He is a regular cast member on the American version of the improvisational comedy television series Whose Line Is It Anyway? He was the host of the daytime talk show The Wayne Brady Show, the original host of Fox's Don't Forget the Lyrics!, and he has hosted Let's Make a Deal since its 2009 revival.

Brady also performs musical theatre; he portrayed Lola/Simon in the Tony Award–winning musical Kinky Boots on Broadway from November 2015 to March 2016. He’s also appeared on Broadway in Chicago, The Wiz, and Moulin Rouge! The Musical. Brady played Aaron Burr in the Chicago production of Hamilton from January to April 2017.

Brady has won five Emmy Awards. He won his first Emmy Award for his work on Whose Line Is It Anyway? in 2003, two more in the next year for The Wayne Brady Show, and two for Let's Make a Deal. He has also been nominated for two Grammy Awards: Best Traditional R&B Vocal Performance for his cover of the Sam Cooke song "A Change Is Gonna Come," and Best Musical Theater Album for the soundtrack of The Wiz.

== Early life ==
Brady was born in Columbus, Georgia, to Caribbean parents. He moved to Orlando, Florida, as a young child to live with his grandmother and aunt. Brady refers to his grandmother, Valerie Petersen, as his "mom," since she raised him. As a child, Brady developed a stutter. This led to him being bullied by other children, which caused him a great deal of anxiety.

At 16, Brady started performing in community theater and in the Orlando improvisation troupe SAK Comedy Lab, where he first started developing his improv skills. He attended Dr. Phillips High School in Orlando, from which he graduated in 1989.

Shortly thereafter, Brady gained employment at Universal Studios Florida, where he appeared in several projects, most notably two involving the character of Beetlejuice. The first was a street show called "Beetlejuice: Dead in Concert," pitting the titular ghost against the Ghostbusters (this is when the park still had the rights to the franchise), where Brady played Winston Zeddemore. Later on, the "ghost with the most" was given his own stage show, "Beetlejuice's Rock 'N Roll Graveyard Revue," where Brady portrayed Dracula.

In 1996, he moved to Los Angeles, where he continued developing his acting skills.

== Career ==
Brady first appeared on national television as a recurring contestant on the sketch comedy competition Kwik Witz from 1996 to 1999, appearing most often as partners with Frank Maciel. Brady was one of the improvisational theater performers in the original (British) version of Whose Line Is It Anyway?, along with Ryan Stiles, Colin Mochrie, and host Clive Anderson in 1998 when the last season was filmed in Hollywood, after which he became a regular on the American version, hosted by Drew Carey. In 2003, Brady won a Primetime Emmy Award for Outstanding Individual Performance in a Variety or Music Program for his work on the show, the only person to win the award for a television series, as opposed to a special, since Dana Carvey in 1993.

He went on to star in his own ABC variety show in 2001, The Wayne Brady Show, and a daytime talk show of the same name in 2002, which lasted two seasons and won four Daytime Emmy Awards, two of which went to Brady for Outstanding Talk Show Host. Brady guest-starred on The Drew Carey Show in 1999 and 2000 to participate in "Drew Live" and "Drew Live II." On the show, Brady played several games taken from Whose Line Is It Anyway? with other characters.

In 2004, Brady joined the Broadway revival of Chicago, playing the role of lawyer Billy Flynn. He made a brief appearance in the final episode of the 2004 season of the comedy Reno 911!. He guest-starred on the Syfy Channel's hit series Stargate SG-1 as Trelak, the first prime of Goa'uld System Lord Ares. He made an appearance on Dave Chappelle's sketch comedy series, Chappelle's Show, poking fun at his squeaky-clean persona. Brady co-wrote and sang the theme song for Disney's animated series The Weekenders. In 2005, he sang and recorded Jim Brickman's original Disney song "Beautiful" (a cover of All-4-One's 2002 hit "Beautiful As You") and its Christmas version. In 2006, Brady became the host of TV Land's That's What I'm Talking About, a talk show discussing the role of African-Americans in the entertainment industry. From August 29 to September 29, 2006, Brady hosted the Fox show Celebrity Duets.

Brady made several guest appearances on the CBS sitcom How I Met Your Mother, playing James Stinson, the gay brother of Neil Patrick Harris's character, Barney Stinson. Brady has also appeared as a guest star for the MTV show Wild 'n Out and lent his voice to the Adult Swim show Robot Chicken. Brady guest-starred in the CBC comedy Getting Along Famously alongside his Whose Line is It Anyway? costar Colin Mochrie. He appeared on the episode "You Don't Know Jack" of the television show Dirt and guest-starred on 30 Rock as Steven Black, Liz Lemon's date for the Source Awards. He co-hosted the short-lived VH1 show Vinyl Justice in 1998. In 2007, he starred in the ABC Family film The List. He starred in Flirt, a comedy pilot that was not picked up by the network. Brady guest-starred as Julius Rock's gifted younger brother, Louis, in the sitcom Everybody Hates Chris, and hosted a singing game show called Don't Forget the Lyrics! on Fox until its cancellation in June 2009. He performed "Wayne Brady: Making $%!^ Up" at the Venetian Hotel in Las Vegas, Nevada four nights a week.

He appeared on two episodes of Kevin Hill. Brady's debut album was released on September 16, 2008. Brady's version of Sam Cooke's "A Change is Gonna Come" earned him a Grammy Award nomination in the Best Traditional R&B Vocal Performance category. Brady started hosting an updated version of the game show Let's Make a Deal for CBS in October 2009, which taped at the Tropicana Resort and Casino in Las Vegas and currently tapes in Los Angeles. The show replaced the soap opera Guiding Light, which ended its long run. Monty Hall, the original host of Let's Make a Deal, served as a consultant for the new show until his death in 2017. Brady was the guest host on the May 3, 2010, episode of WWE Raw, where he was involved in an in-ring segment with Edge and Randy Orton, eventually getting RKO'd by Orton. Later that year, in August, Brady played Tom Collins in a staged production of Rent at the Hollywood Bowl. The production was directed by Neil Patrick Harris.

Brady appeared alongside Let's Make a Deal announcer Jonathan Mangum in two episodes of Fast and Loose, an improvisational series on BBC2 hosted by Hugh Dennis, in January 2011. Then, with Holly Robinson Peete, he co-hosted the 42nd annual NAACP Image Awards on March 4, 2011. On May 3, 2011, he appeared on Dancing with the Stars as the lead performer in a tribute to James Brown, celebrating what would have been Brown's 78th birthday in the Macy's Stars of Dance segment. He has also been a special guest of Drew Carey's Improv-A-Ganza on GSN. Brady made a cameo in the 2011 song "Dedication To My Ex (Miss That)" by Lloyd featuring Lil Wayne and André 3000, narrating Lil Wayne's section of the song. He appeared as a special guest star in the March 14, 2012, episode of the TV series Psych.

Brady starred in the 2012 ABC improvisational comedy series Trust Us with Your Life and returned for The CW's revival of Whose Line Is It Anyway? in the summer of 2013. Brady guest-starred as Don in the Phineas and Ferb episode "Where's Pinky?" on June 7, 2013, and from February 9 to 13, 2015, guest-hosted The Late Late Show on CBS. In November 2015, Brady replaced Billy Porter as Lola in Kinky Boots on Broadway until March 2016.

Brady assumed the lead role of Aaron Burr in the PrivateBank Theatre production of Hamilton in Chicago from January 17 to April 9, 2017. In 2018, Brady began a recurring role in the sci-fi drama Colony as Everett Kynes, the administrator of the Seattle colony and creator of an algorithm used in sorting and identifying people. On April 29, 2018, Brady won the Daytime Emmy Award for Outstanding Game Show Host for Let's Make A Deal for the first time, after seven previous nominations. In November 2018, Brady began making appearances as Dr. Reese Buckingham on The Bold and the Beautiful. On October 10, 2019, he was featured in a 30-minute YouTube documentary created by SoulPancake in collaboration with Funny or Die wherein a variety of comedians discuss mental health called Laughing Matters. On December 18, 2019, Brady competed on season two of The Masked Singer as "Fox." He was named the winner of that season.

Beginning in 2020, Brady plays a major recurring role during the third season of The CW superhero drama series Black Lightning features the DC Comics character Tyson Sykes / Gravedigger. It was also announced that he had created a reality competition show to air on BYU TV called Wayne Brady's Comedy IQ, in which teens would be taught skills and compete in weekly challenges. Brady later appeared as a guest panelist in season four of The Masked Singer where he also sang Maroon 5's "Memories" as "Mr. TV" at the start of the sixth episode. On December 28, 2020, it was announced that Brady would star as Django in a benefit concert presentation of Ratatouille the Musical, an internet meme that originated on TikTok, inspired by the 2007 Disney/Pixar film. The concert streamed exclusively on TodayTix on January 1, 2021, and raised over $1 million for The Actors Fund.

On September 8, 2022, Brady was announced as a contestant on season 31 of Dancing with the Stars. He was partnered with Witney Carson and they finished in 3rd place. The following year, Brady appeared as a guest in the second season of "Make Some Noise," a comedy game show hosted by Dropout.tv.

In March 2025, Brady launched a podcast with Jonathan Mangum called Wayne Brady's What If with Jonathan Mangum.

In September 2025, Brady joined a line-up of comedians, including Dave Chappelle, slated to participate in the Riyadh Comedy Festival, an event hosted in Riyadh, the capital city of Saudi Arabia. The festival was criticized by Human Rights Watch, which characterized the event as an attempt by the Saudi government to whitewash its human rights abuses.

== Personal life ==
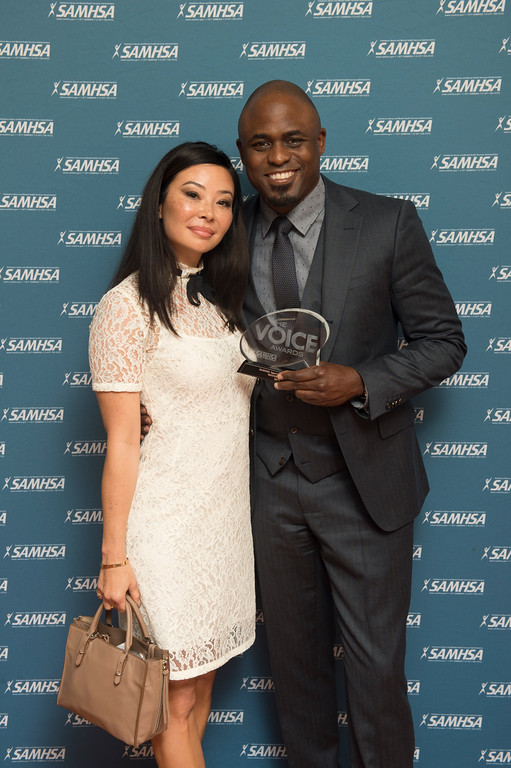
Brady and Taketa in 2015

Brady has been married twice. He married Diana Lasso on December 31, 1993. They divorced on September 21, 1995. On April 3, 1999, he married dancer Mandie Taketa. He and Taketa have one child, a daughter born in 2003. Brady and Taketa separated on April 5, 2006; Taketa filed for divorce on July 2, 2007, and their divorce was finalized on April 14, 2008. They have remained close friends and co-parents. In 2024, Brady learned that he has a son from his ex-girlfriend Tina, with whom Brady had an intimate relationship during the COVID-19 pandemic.

In 2007, Brady became an official supporter of Ronald McDonald House Charities and is a member of their celebrity board, the Friends of RMHC.

In 2013, Bill Maher compared Brady to President Barack Obama, in that, in popular culture, they were both supposedly "not Black enough." Brady took issue with this statement, suggesting that Maher should "be careful when [he makes] statements like that" because it will allow his viewers to make the same stereotypical assumptions about Black people.

Brady has suffered from clinical depression. On his 42nd birthday, in 2014, he had a mental breakdown and later credited Taketa for helping him recover.

In August 2023, Brady came out as pansexual.

Brady is an honorary member of the Phi Beta Sigma fraternity.

== Filmography ==
=== Films ===
Year	Title	Role	Notes
2004	Clifford's Really Big Movie	Shackelford	Voice
2005	Roll Bounce	D.J. Johnny Feelgood	
2006	Stuart Little 3: Call of the Wild	Reeko	Voice, direct-to-video
2006	The Adventures of Brer Rabbit	Brer Wolf	Voice, direct-to-video
2006	Crossover	Vaughn	
2007	The List	Lewis	
2012	Foodfight!	Daredevil Dan	Voice
2013	Scooby-Doo! Stage Fright	Brick Pimiento	Voice, direct-to-video
2013	1982	Alonzo	
2014	The Hero of Color City	Blue	Voice
2015	VeggieTales: Noah's Ark	Shem	Voice, direct-to-video
2016	Todrick Hall: Straight Outta Oz	Todrick's Father	Visual album
2020	Phineas and Ferb the Movie: Candace Against the Universe	Stapler Fist	Voice
2020	Blindfire	Javon	
2020	WRZ: White Racist Zombies	Dr. Knowles	Executive producer
2022	Blank	Henry	
2023	Self Reliance	Himself	
TBA	The Prince		Filming

=== Television ===
Year	Title	Role	Notes
1990	Superboy	John	Episode: "The Sons of Icarus"
1993	I'll Fly Away	Damon	2 episodes
1993	In the Heat of the Night	Henry Ulmer	Episode: "Hatton's Turn"
1993	Clarissa Explains It All	Pepe's Pizza Delivery Man	Episode: "Editor in Chief"
1997–1999	Kwik Witz	Himself	Syndicated improv
1998	Oh Yeah! Cartoons	Blotto	Voice, episode: "Blotto"
1998	Whose Line Is It Anyway? (UK)	Himself	3 episodes in Series 10
1998–2006, 2013–2024	Whose Line Is It Anyway? (US)	Himself	Starring: Seasons 2–7, 9–21; recurring: Seasons 1 & 8 Also executive producer (Seasons 9–21)
1999, 2000	The Drew Carey Show	Himself	"Drew Live" and "Drew Live II" (improv episodes)
2000	Batman Beyond	Micron	Voice, episode: "The Call"
2000	Geppetto	Lazardo V The Magician	Television film
2001–2004	The Wayne Brady Show	Host	Variety show
2002	Miss America	Host	
2003	The Electric Piper	Sly	Voice, television film
2003	American Dreams	Jackie Wilson	Episode: "The One"
2004	Chappelle's Show	Himself	2 episodes
2004	Sesame Street	Himself	
2004	Going to the Mat	Mason Wyatt	Television film
2004	Reno 911!	New Jones - Deputy Culufu Garwood	Episode: "Department Investigation: Part 2"
2005	Stargate SG-1	Trelak	Episode: "It's Good to be King"
2005	Kevin Hill	Pastor Jerry Carver	2 episodes
2006–2008	Everybody Hates Chris	Louis	2 episodes
2006	Getting Along Famously	Jackie Kinghorn	Episode: "Toucha My Hand"
2006	Higglytown Heroes	Doctor	Voice, episode: "A Slippery Situation"
2006	Girlfriends	Derek Tyler	4 episodes
2006	Robot Chicken	Pegasus 'Sunny Muffin', Salam Fayyad	Voice, episode: "Adoption's an Option"
2006	Shorty McShorts' Shorts	Cameron	Voice, 3 episodes
2006–2014	How I Met Your Mother	James Stinson	13 episodes
2007	30 Rock	Steven Black	Episode: "The Source Awards"
2007	Dirt	Henchman	Episode: "You Don't Know Jack"
2007–2009	Don't Forget the Lyrics!	Host	
2009–present	Let's Make a Deal	Host	Executive producer (7 episodes)
2010	WWE Raw	Himself	
2011	Fast and Loose	Himself	UK improv; 2 episodes
2011	Are We There Yet?	Devin	Episode: "The Man and the Bragging Snafu Episode"
2011	Drew Carey's Improv-A-Ganza	Himself	5 episodes
2011	RuPaul's Drag Race season 3	Himself/Guest judge	Episode: "RuPaul's Hair Extravaganza"
2011	The Fresh Beat Band	Mr. Fondu	Episode: "Pink Swan"
2012–2013	American Dad!	Cuba Gooding Jr., Tungee	Voice, 3 episodes
2012	Trust Us with Your Life	Himself	7 episodes
2012	Psych	Hilton Fox	Episode: "Shawn and the Real Girl"
2012	Key & Peele	Centipede Buddy	Episode #2.6
2012–2018	Sofia the First	Clover	Voice, main role
2013	The Problem Solverz	Uncle Chocofuss	Voice, episode: "Alfe Has a Baby"
2013	So You Think You Can Dance	Himself/Guest judge	2 episodes
2013	Baby Daddy	Chase Baxter	Episode: "There's Something Fitchy Going On"
2013–2014	Phineas and Ferb	Don the City Hall Tour Guide / various	Voice, 2 episodes
2013–2016	Real Husbands of Hollywood	Himself	9 episodes
2014	Hollywood Game Night	Himself	Episode: "50 Charades of Grey"
2014	So You Think You Can Dance	Himself/Guest judge	
2014	Being Mary Jane	Sean	Episode: "Mixed Messages"
2014	TripTank	Narrator, Dicky, Dad	Voice, 2 episodes
2014	The BET Honors	—N/a	Executive producer
2015	The Late Late Show	Himself/Guest host	5 episodes
2015	Open Carrie	Stokley	TV short
2016	Milo Murphy's Law	Eugene	Voice, episode: "The Doctor Zone Files/The Notes"
2016	Aftermath	Lamar 'Booner' Boone	2 episodes
2016–2022	The Loud House	Harold McBride	Voice, 19 episodes
2017	Drop the Mic	Himself	Episode: "Wayne Brady vs. Jake Owen / Kenny G vs. Richard Marx"
2018	Colony	Everett Kynes	8 episodes
2018–2019	The Bold and the Beautiful	Dr. Reese Buckingham	41 episodes
2019	The Masked Singer	Fox/Himself	Season 2 winner
2019	American Soul	Little Richard	Episode: "What Are You Looking At?"
2020	Black Lightning	Tyson Sykes / Gravedigger	4 episodes
2020	Wayne Brady's Comedy IQ	Himself	10 episodes
2020	The Neighborhood	Councilman Isaiah Evans	2 episodes
2020	Hell's Kitchen	Himself	Episode: "Shrimply Spectacular"
2020	The Masked Singer	Himself/Mr. TV/Guest panelist	Season 4, episode 6
2021	Game of Talents	Host	Executive producer
2021	Mixed-ish	Geoffrey	Episode: "Every Little Step"
2021–2022	The Good Fight	Del Cooper	6 episodes
2022	A Black Lady Sketch Show	Reggie	Episode: "Peaches and Eggplants for Errbody!"
2022	That Damn Michael Che	Dad	Episode: "Ballad of a Thin Man"
2022	Beat Bobby Flay	Himself; guest host	Episode: "Who's Wayne is it Anyway"
2022	Dancing with the Stars	Himself	Contestant; Season 31 (3rd place)
2022	American Music Awards	Host	
2022	American Gigolo	Lorenzo	6 episodes
2022	The Cuphead Show!	King Dice	Voice
2023	Make Some Noise	Himself	Episode: "'Not Really My Thing' by Harry Styles"
2024	After Midnight	Himself	Contestant; Episode 16 (Super Bowl special)
2024	Wayne Brady: The Family Remix	Himself	Reality series
2026	Sofia the First: Royal Magic	Clover	Voice, recurring role

=== Video games ===
Year	Title	Role	Notes
2008	The Legend of Spyro: Dawn of the Dragon	Sparx	

=== Music videos ===
Year	Title	Role	Artist
2017	"Young Dumb & Broke"	Janitor	Khalid

== Theater ==
Theater work
Year(s)	Production	Role	Venue	Location
2004	Chicago	Billy Flynn	Ambassador Theatre	Broadway
2005	Chicago	Billy Flynn	Pantages Theatre	US National Tour
2010	Rent	Tom Collins	Hollywood Bowl	Los Angeles
2014	Kiss Me, Kate	Fred Graham, Petruchio	Pasadena Playhouse	Pasadena
2015–2016	Kinky Boots	Lola	Al Hirschfeld Theatre	Broadway
2016	White Rabbit, Red Rabbit	Solo	Westside Theatre	Off-Broadway
2016	Merrily We Roll Along	Charley Kringas	Wallis Annenberg Center for the Performing Arts	Los Angeles
2017	Hamilton	Aaron Burr	PrivateBank Theatre	Chicago
2018	Kinky Boots	Lola	Al Hirschfeld Theatre	Broadway
2019–2020	Freestyle Love Supreme	Self	Booth Theatre	Broadway
2021	Ratatouille the Musical	Django	-	Virtual concert
2022	Kinky Boots	Lola	Hollywood Bowl	Los Angeles
2024	The Wiz	The Wiz	Golden Gate Theatre	US National Tour
2024	The Wiz	The Wiz	Pantages Theatre	US National Tour
2024	The Wiz	The Wiz	Marquis Theatre	Broadway
2025	Moulin Rouge! The Musical	Harold Zidler	Al Hirschfeld Theatre	Broadway
2025-2026	All Out: Comedy About Ambition	Performer	Nederlander Theatre	Broadway
2026	La Cage aux Folles	Georges	New York City Center	Off-Broadway

== Discography ==
Albums

Year	Album details	Chart positions		
Year	Album details	US	US R&B	US Heat
2008	A Long Time Coming: Released: September 16, 2008; Label: Peak/Concord Music	157	20	2
2011	Radio Wayne: Released: May 31, 2011; Label: Walt Disney	—	—	—

Singles

- 2000
  - "The Weekenders" Theme Song
- 2004
  - "Unsung Heroes"
  - "Between" – Wayne Brady with The Sesame Street Muppets
- 2005
  - "Beautiful" – Wayne Brady, accompanied on piano by songwriter Jim Brickman
  - "Don't Stop" – Jamie Jones featuring Wayne Brady and William Carthright
- 2008
  - "Ordinary"
- 2009
  - "F.W.B."
- 2013
  - "Whistle While I Work it" – Chester See featuring Tobuscus with Wayne Brady
- 2019
  - "Flirtin' With Forever"

== Awards and nominations ==
Year	Association	Category	Nominated work	Result	Ref.
2001	Primetime Emmy Awards	Outstanding Individual Performance in a Variety or Music Program	Whose Line Is It Anyway?	Nominated	
2002	Primetime Emmy Awards	Outstanding Individual Performance in a Variety or Music Program	Whose Line Is It Anyway?	Nominated	
2003	Primetime Emmy Awards	Outstanding Individual Performance in a Variety or Music Program	Whose Line Is It Anyway?	Won	
2003	Daytime Emmy Awards	Outstanding Talk Show Host	The Wayne Brady Show	Won	
2004	Daytime Emmy Awards	Outstanding Talk Show Host	The Wayne Brady Show	Won	
2009	Grammy Awards	Best Traditional R&B Vocal Performance	"A Change Is Gonna Come"	Nominated	
2010	Daytime Emmy Awards	Outstanding Game Show Host	Let's Make a Deal	Nominated	
2011	Daytime Emmy Awards	Outstanding Game Show Host	Let's Make a Deal	Nominated	
2012	Daytime Emmy Awards	Outstanding Game Show Host	Let's Make a Deal	Nominated	
2013	Daytime Emmy Awards	Outstanding Game Show Host	Let's Make a Deal	Nominated	
2014	Daytime Emmy Awards	Outstanding Game Show Host	Let's Make a Deal	Nominated	
2014	Daytime Emmy Awards	Outstanding Original Song	"30,000 Reasons to Love Me" for Let's Make a Deal (lyrics writer)	Won	
2016	Daytime Emmy Awards	Outstanding Game Show Host	Let's Make a Deal	Nominated	
2017	Daytime Emmy Awards	Outstanding Game Show Host	Let's Make a Deal	Nominated	
2018	Daytime Emmy Awards	Outstanding Game Show Host	Let's Make a Deal	Won	
2019	Daytime Emmy Awards	Outstanding Game Show Host	Let's Make a Deal	Nominated	
2019	Daytime Emmy Awards	Outstanding Guest Performer in a Drama Series	The Bold and the Beautiful	Nominated	
2020	Daytime Emmy Awards	Outstanding Game Show Host	Let's Make a Deal	Nominated	
2021	Daytime Emmy Awards	Outstanding Game Show Host	Let's Make a Deal	Nominated	
2022	Daytime Emmy Awards	Outstanding Game Show Host	Let's Make a Deal	Nominated	
2024	Broadway.com Audience Awards	Favorite Featured Actor in a Musical	The Wiz	Nominated	
2025	Grammy Awards	Best Musical Theater Album	The Wiz	Nominated	
