= Ismael Loutfi =

American comedian (born 1992 or 1993)

- Born: 1992 or 1993 (age 33–34)
- Occupation: Comedian

Ismael Loutfi (born 1992 or 1993) is an American comedian.

== Life and career ==
Loutfi grew up in Ocala, Florida. He is of Syrian descent. He began performing stand-up comedy at age 18. After his father's death in 2020, he created a one-man show, Heavenly Baba, about his relationship with his father and his father's eccentric promotion of Islam through messages on his decorated Pontiac Grand Prix.
