= The Hollow Men (comedy troupe) =

British sketch comedy group

The Hollow Men are an English sketch comedy group consisting of David Armand, Nick Tanner, Rupert Russell, and Sam Spedding. The Hollow Men is also the title of their TV show broadcast in the United States by Comedy Central. The show follows the kind of silliness from sketch comedy shows like Monty Python's Flying Circus and The Kids in the Hall. The six-episode series aired in early 2005. In 2006 they broadcast a BBC Radio 4 sketch show, also of the same name. The radio show was recommissioned and a second series was aired in September 2007, along with a special broadcast from the Edinburgh Festival. Both series also featured Katy Brand. The group performed extensively as a live act with shows in London, Edinburgh, Los Angeles, Montreal and New York.

== History ==
The four members met when they were students at University of Cambridge. The group's big break came when they appeared at the Edinburgh Fringe festival in 2002, which led to gigs in New York City and a slot at the U.S. Comedy Arts Festival in Aspen, Colorado, in 2003, where they received the HBO Comedy Jury Award for best sketch/alternative act.
