= Mock the Week =

British satirical news panel show

- Genre: Comedy panel game
- Created by: Dan Patterson; Mark Leveson
- Presented by: Dara Ó Briain
- Starring: Hugh Dennis; Andy Parsons; Frankie Boyle; Rory Bremner; Russell Howard; Chris Addison; Angela Barnes; Rhys James
- Theme music composer: Bruce Foxton
- Opening theme: "News of the World" by The Jam
- Country of origin: United Kingdom
- Original language: English
- No. of series: 23
- No. of episodes: 256 (list of episodes)

Production
- Producers: Dan Patterson; Mark Leveson; Ewan Phillips; Ruth Wallace
- Production locations: BBC Television Centre (series 1–11, 17, 21, Summer Specials); The London Studios (series 12–16); BBC Elstree Centre (series 18–20); Elstree Studios (series 22)
- Running time: 29–45 minutes
- Production company: Angst Productions

Original release
- Network: BBC Two
- Release: 5 June 2005 – 4 November 2022
- Network: TLC
- Release: 1 February 2026 – present

Mock the Week is a weekly British topical satirical celebrity panel show, created by Dan Patterson and Mark Leveson. It is produced by Angst Productions and was broadcast on BBC Two from 5 June 2005 to 4 November 2022 and TLC since 1 February 2026. Presenter Dara Ó Briain and panellist Hugh Dennis appeared in every episode of the BBC series, with a variety of other stand-up comedians being regular, frequent, occasional or one-off guest panellists during the show's history.

The format of the programme sees six comedians divided into two teams and performing on a faux game show, in which the quiz aspect of answering questions relating to major and regional news items, all taken from the week before each episode's filming, is sidelined to focus on satirical, topical discussions on news items, stand-up routines, and the use of improvisational comedy. Every series both on the BBC and TLC included a compilation episode showing notable scenes, out-takes and additional footage cut out after filming, with repeats of the BBC episodes being frequently shown on the channel U&Dave, with high viewing figures.

== Format ==
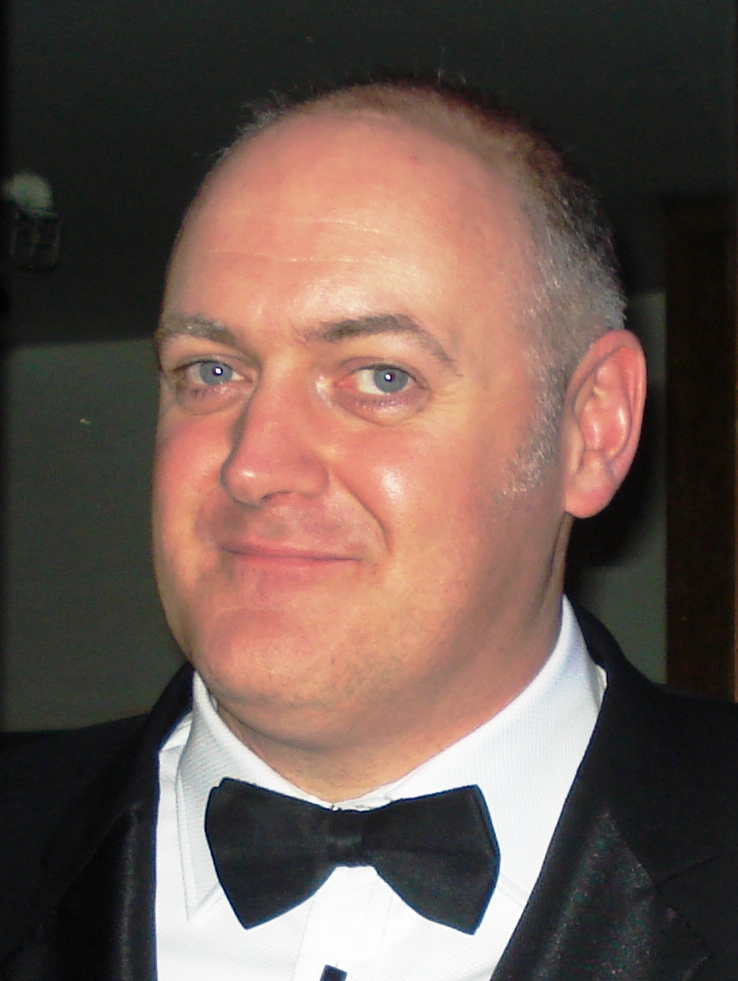
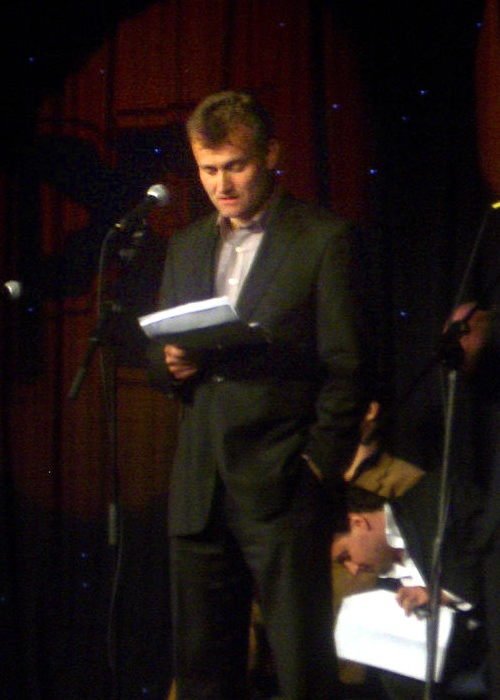
Both Dara Ó Briain and Hugh Dennis are regular members of the cast on Mock the Week.

Two teams of three panelists each, all comedians, competed on Mock the Week over four rounds, presided over by host Dara Ó Briain. Although the programme maintained a quiz aspect to the format, which featured questions on news items taken from those made during the week before an episode's filming, it was largely sidelined completely with a focus on comedy derived from topical, satirical discussions on the subject of each question, as well as from rounds featuring either stand-up routines by certain panellists, or improvisation comedy. Unlike Have I Got News for You, a similar topical, satirical programme that maintains a similar format but without the stand-up routines and improvisational comedy, Mock the Week's format did not use team captains or maintain a proper scoring system – teams generally win a round depending on who Dara, the host, deemed won it.

Each episode on the BBC was edited to include about four rounds from those filmed, to fit a 30-minute timeslot. Some content not used was often retained for use in a compilation episode, which also included outtakes and highlights from the series. Although the first two series featured a multitude of different rounds for use, most of these were later abolished, leaving the programme to primarily use the following rounds in each BBC episode:

- Picture of the Week: An image round in which panelists are shown a photograph from a news item and must identify the related story from it. The round usually focuses on panelists giving comedic answers that are deliberately wrong or mock the subject(s) of the image. The in-joke is Hugh Dennis finally saying the obvious answer, such as "That is Boris Johnson". The round generally does not conclude then, as both the host and panelists will usually enter topical, satirical discussion on the news item, including any additional questions given by the host.
- Wheel of News: A stand-up challenge in which a handful of panelists must perform a stand-up routine, with each basing it on a subject determined by a "Random Topic Generator" (e.g. Education). The host often introduces the round with a title that is a comical reference to a recent event discussed earlier in the show. The round initially featured most of the panelists appearing in the episode. However, the number of panelists was gradually reduced to two; this was to provide more time for their routines.
- If This is the Answer, What is the Question?: A round in which panelists are given the answer to a question on a topic and attempt to reveal what the question is, related to a current news story. The round usually involves panellists giving comedic questions that the answer could be connected to, and continues until the host prompts one member to give the correct question. The round generally does not conclude when this happens, as both the host and panelists will usually enter topical, satirical discussion on the news item, including any additional questions given by the host.
- Headliners: A round where the panelists are shown a photograph relating to a current news story, similarly to "Picture of the Week", but with the addition of a four-letter abbreviation for a four-word story headline relating to the photo. Similarly to "If This is the Answer, What is the Question?", the panelists usually give comedic responses of what the abbreviation stands for, and they continue until the host prompts them to guess the correct answer (example: "BRNS" = "Blair Retires Next Summer"; "TFHC" = Tories Fight Hospital Cuts", etc.)
- Scenes We'd Like to See: An improvisation round, operating similar to "Scenes from a Hat" from Whose Line Is It Anyway?, in which panelists are given two topics and must provide comedic suggestions and ideas for each one, with the host buzzing each panelist after they give an idea in order to let another come forward with their suggestion. Some examples of topics for comedic suggestions seen on the show include "Commercials That Never Made it to Air", "Rejected Questions From This Year's Exams", and "What the Queen Didn't Say in Her Annual Message", among many others.

On occasion the BBC programme included an additional round, mainly shown during a compilation or special episode of the programme:

- "Newsreel": An improvisation round, similar to the game of "Film Dub" from Whose Line Is It Anyway?, in which a panellist – primarily Hugh Dennis – is shown a piece of news footage with no sound, and must provide either a comedic commentary track, or vocal track of the people involved.
- "Between the lines": An improvisation round involving two panellists. One performs as a notable figure (e.g. a politician) conducting a press conference, while another acts as a "translator", comically stating what they "really" mean to say. For example, panellist A might be performing as the Prime Minister and say "We are making certain that schools are well provided with school meals", to which panellist B might comically translate it as "We made a deal for cheap soup and biscuits from the Russians". Since the 2026 revival, this has appeared more regularly in the main show.

The TLC version introduced another new round:

- "You Think That's Bad?": A round where the panelists tell short anecdotes and try to outdo each other in tales of woe. Ó Briain then decides who has the worst anecdote.

== Panellists ==
The panellists were primarily comedians, including stand-up comedians, many of whom made multiple appearances. Hugh Dennis appeared in all BBC episodes from 2005 to 2022, except for a special episode broadcast as part of David Walliams' 24 Hour Panel People. Alongside Dennis and Ó Briain, others appeared as regular panellists, including Rory Bremner (Series 1 and 2), Frankie Boyle (Series 1 to 7), Andy Parsons (Series 3 to 14), Russell Howard (Series 4 to 9) and Chris Addison (Series 10 to 12).

Rhys James became a regular panellist for the TLC episodes.

== Controversy and criticism ==
On several occasions, Mock the Week has been the source of complaints, due to some risqué comments made by the panellists and the show's extreme use of profanity (particularly during Frankie Boyle's tenure). In the first episode of Series 4, during a segment called "What The Queen Didn't Say in Her Christmas Message", Boyle made the comment: "I am now so old that my pussy is haunted." This led to the BBC's director general Mark Thompson being challenged about the comments on Newsnight. Boyle later quipped "That was three years ago. If it wasn't haunted then it certainly is now." In 2008, a larger controversy arose following another comment made by Boyle regarding swimmer Rebecca Adlington. Boyle stated that "she looks like someone who's looking at themselves in the back of a spoon". The BBC ruled that the jokes were indeed "humiliating" and "risked offending the audience", while also calling Boyle "a brilliant member of the team". Despite this, Adlington's agent said that simply admitting mistakes was not enough, saying: "By giving Frankie Boyle a rebuke they fail to discourage others from doing the same."

After leaving the show, Boyle criticised both the show's production team and the BBC Trust. He claims that the show did not cover enough major news stories and was too restrictive on his risqué comedy act, as the producers and the BBC Trust were afraid of "frightening the horses".

The lack of female guests on the programme has been the subject of complaints in the letters page of the Radio Times. Jo Brand, while criticising the male-dominated genre of comedy panel shows, said in 2009, "I don't do Mock the Week any more and neither do some male stand-ups I know who have tried it once. We just don't like the prospect of having to bite someone's foot off before they let us say something."

In 2013, former panelist Rory Bremner stated his reasons for leaving the show, saying: "I felt that there was a new and highly competitive and quite aggressive tendency there and felt uncomfortable. But I've since found out that very few people have felt comfortable doing Mock the Week." He also criticised the way comedians such as Linda Smith were treated by new comedians, who "are like prize fighters".

== Merchandise ==
=== DVDs ===
On 26 November 2007, the show's first DVD, Mock the Week: Too Hot for TV, was released by Spirit Entertainment. It contains a DVD-exclusive compilation feature containing unseen footage, in addition to three extended episodes from series five, containing scenes that were considered too rude for broadcast. The three extended episodes are entitled "Putin, Henman & Konnie Huq", "Nuts, Pies and Nim Nim Nim", and "Money, Sex and The Lib Dems".

On 9 November 2009, Mock the Week: Too Hot for TV 2 was released, once again by Sprit Entertainment. Again, the DVD contains the main "Too Hot For TV" feature with a compilation of unseen footage, plus three extended episodes from the series archives titled "The Anal Lube Show", "The Leg Show" and "The Hedgehog Show". The extended episodes have a total of more than 40 minutes of unseen material. Audio CD versions of both DVDs are available.

On 8 November 2010, Mock the Week: Too Hot for TV 3 was released, once more by Spirit. Like the previous two, this DVD features an hour-long smut reel and three extended episodes titled "The Elves and Testicles Show", "The Prisons and Other Dodgy Stuff Show", and "The Johnny Blowjob and Bird Flu Show".

=== Books ===
Boxtree published seven original tie-in books between 2008 and 2014, plus one that compiled the best of the first two books.

- Mock the Week: Scenes We'd Like to See (August 2008)
- Mock the Week: This Year's Book (September 2009)
- Mock the Week: 1001 Jokes (January 2010, collected the best of the first two books, later published in paperback as Mock the Week: 1001 Scenes We'd Like to See)
- Mock the Week: Next Year's Book (September 2010)
- Mock the Week's Funniest Book of All Time (2011)
- Mock the Week's Only Book You'll Ever Need (2012)
- Mock the Week's Ultimate Panic-Buy! (2013)
- Mock the Week's Brand Spanking New Scenes We'd Like to See (2014)

== Transmissions ==
=== Original series ===
Series	Episodes	Originally released	
Series	Episodes	First released	Last released
1	6	5 June 2005	10 July 2005
2	7	20 January 2006	2 March 2006
3	7	14 September 2006	26 October 2006
4	6	11 January 2007	15 February 2007
5	12	12 July 2007	27 September 2007
6	12	10 July 2008	25 September 2008
7	12	9 July 2009	24 September 2009
8	6	21 January 2010	25 February 2010
9	12	17 June 2010	14 October 2010
10	12	9 June 2011	13 October 2011
11	12	14 June 2012	11 October 2012
12	12	13 June 2013	10 October 2013
13	12	12 June 2014	21 November 2014
14	12	11 June 2015	19 October 2015
15	12	9 June 2016	14 October 2016
16	12	8 June 2017	13 October 2017
17	12	7 June 2018	12 October 2018
18	12	23 May 2019	13 December 2019
19	12 (Note: 13 if the Christmas episode midway through the run is included)	22 October 2020	4 February 2021
20	12	13 May 2021	16 December 2021
21	7	23 September 2022	4 November 2022

=== Revival series ===
Series	Episodes	Originally released		Notes
Series	Episodes	First released	Last released	Notes
22	9	1 February 2026	29 March 2026	Listed as Season 1 by TLC and Discovery+.
23	9 (Note: 11 when including Christmas and end of year specials)	13 September 2026	TBA	TBA

=== Specials ===
Originally released		Title	Episodes
First released	Last released	Title	Episodes
23 December 2008		Christmas Special	1
22 December 2009		Christmas Special	1
21 December 2010		Christmas Special	1
5 March 2011		24 Hour Panel People Comic Relief Special	1
20 December 2011		Christmas Special	1
27 December 2012		Christmas Special	1
31 December 2013		Christmas Special	1
23 December 2014		Christmas Special	1
31 December 2014		New Year's Eve Special	1
21 December 2015		Christmas Special	1
14 December 2016		Christmas Special	1
20 December 2017		Christmas Special	1
21 December 2018		Christmas Special	1
20 December 2019		Christmas Special	1
21 December 2020		Christmas Special	1
28 December 2021		End of Year Special	1
7 June 2026	5 July 2026	Summer Specials	5

A ten-episode compilation series, entitled Mock the Week Looks Back At... and focusing on previous contributions centred around a different theme and topic, was broadcast in spring 2013.

== International version ==
In May 2023, it was announced that a US version of Mock the Week was being developed for Amazon Prime Video, with Dan Patterson returning as executive producer alongside Trevor Noah; the series was originally slated to release in 2024, but never came to fruition. Rhys James said in August 2025 that it was a victim of the 2023 writers' strike.
