= Dan Patterson =

British television producer (born 1960)

- Born: March 1960 (age 66)
- Occupations: Television producer and writer

Dan Patterson (born March 1960) is a British television producer and writer, best known as co-creator, alongside Mark Leveson, and producer of both the British and American incarnations of the comedy improvisation show Whose Line Is It Anyway? and the British satirical comedy panel show Mock the Week.

Patterson and Leveson created Whose Line Is It Anyway? initially as a 6-episode radio show for the BBC in 1988. Later that year, the show moved to television on Channel 4, running for 136 episodes over the next ten years. An American version then ran on ABC from 1998 to 2007, before returning on The CW in 2013. In 2005, Patterson and Leveson created Mock the Week, which ran on the BBC for 245 episodes until 2022, before returning on TLC in 2026. Patterson has been a producer on every episode of Whose Line (both UK and US) and Mock the Week.

In 2004, he established Angst Productions, which is responsible for Mock the Week.

In October 2013, the play The Duck House, a farcical political satire which he wrote alongside Have I Got News for You writer Colin Swash, embarked on a five-week tour before transferring to the Vaudeville Theatre in London's West End through Spring 2014.

== Television ==
Producer

- Whose Line Is It Anyway? (UK version) - Channel 4 (1988–1999)
- Whose Line Is It Anyway? (US version) - ABC/The CW (executive producer 1998–2024)
- Clive Anderson Talks Back - Channel 4 (1989–1995)
- Clive Anderson All Talk - BBC One (1996–1998)
- S&M - Channel 4 (1991)
- The Brain Drain - BBC Two (1992–1993)
- Room 101 - BBC Two (1994–1997)
- The Peter Principle - BBC One (1995–1997)
- Never Mind the Horrocks - Channel 4 (1996)
- 29 Minutes of Fame - BBC One (2005)
- Mock the Week - BBC Two/TLC (2005–present)
- Fast and Loose - BBC Two (2011)

== Stage ==
Writer

- The Duck House
