= List of Whose Line Is It Anyway? (British TV series) episodes =

Whose Line is it Anyway? (often known as simply Whose Line? or WLIIA) is a British improvisational comedy series hosted by Clive Anderson on Channel 4 which ran from 23 September 1988 to 4 February 1999. The programme ran for 10 series with 136 episodes in total, including the original 1988 pilot episode (broadcast as part of series 1), a 1989 Christmas special (broadcast as part of series 2), and 1 or 2 compilation episodes in each series, made up of materiel left out of that series' regular episodes.

The show consists of a panel of four performers who create characters, scenes and songs on the spot, in the style of short-form improvisation games, many taken from theatresports. Topics for the games are based on either audience suggestions or predetermined prompts from the host. The show ostensibly take the form of a game show with Anderson arbitrarily assigning points and likewise choosing a winner at the end of each episode. However, the show lacks the true stakes and competition of a game show by design. The "game show" format is simply part of the comedy.

Most episodes of the show were filmed in Britain, with several episodes in 1991 and 1992 filmed in New York and the entire last series filmed in Hollywood in 1998, coinciding with the filming of the first series of the subsequent American version of Whose Line Is It Anyway?, which featured several of the same cast members as the original British version of the show.

== Series overview ==
Series	Episodes	Originally released	
Series	Episodes	First released	Last released
1	13	23 September 1988	16 December 1988
2	17	10 November 1989	16 March 1990
3	17	18 January 1991	10 May 1991
4	13	24 January 1992	17 April 1992
5	9	5 March 1993	30 April 1993
6	11	1 July 1994	6 January 1995
7	12	28 July 1995	26 December 1995
8	14	12 July 1996	24 December 1996
9	19	10 July 1997	19 September 1998
10	11	11 November 1998	4 February 1999

== Episodes ==
The "winner(s)" of each episode – as chosen by host Clive Anderson – are highlighted in italics.

=== Series 1 (1988) ===
No. overall	No. in series	Original air date	Performer 1	Performer 2	Performer 3	Performer 4
1	1	23 September 1988	Archie Hahn	Josie Lawrence	Paul Merton	John Sessions
Games performed: Authors, Sound Effects, Songstyles, World's Worst, Props, Party Quirks
2	2	30 September 1988	Archie Hahn	Rory Bremner	Jimmy Mulville	John Sessions
Games performed: Authors, Film and Theatre Styles, World's Worst, Props, Sound Effects, Couples
3	3	7 October 1988	Stephen Fry	Peter Cook	Josie Lawrence	John Sessions
Games performed: Authors, Film and Theatre Styles, Props, Panel, Rap
4	4	14 October 1988	Tony Slattery	Betty Thomas	Paul Merton	John Sessions
Games performed: Authors, Film and Theatre Styles, Props, Every Other Line, Film Dub, Party Quirks
5	5	21 October 1988	Josie Lawrence	Jonathan Pryce	Paul Merton	John Sessions
Games performed: Authors, Film and Theatre Styles, World's Worst, Songstyles, Film Dub, Party Quirks
6	6	28 October 1988	Graeme Garden	Jan Ravens	George McGrath	John Sessions
Games performed: Authors, Story, Props, Party Quirks, Every Other Line, Film Dub, American Musical
7	7	4 November 1988	Tony Slattery	Jonathan Pryce	Rory McGrath	John Sessions
Games performed: Authors, Film and Theatre Styles, World's Worst, Props, Advertisement to Music, Film Dub, Remote Control
8	8	11 November 1988	Jon Glover	Jimmy Mulville	Josie Lawrence	John Sessions
Pilot episode. Games performed: Authors, Film and Theatre Styles, Film Dub, Songstyles, Props, Opera
9	9	18 November 1988	Richard Kaplan	Griff Rhys Jones	Paul Merton	John Sessions
Games performed: Authors, Film and Theatre Styles, World's Worst, Props, Remote Control, Party Quirks
10	10	25 November 1988	Mike McShane	Josie Lawrence	Tony Slattery	John Sessions
Games performed: Authors, Film and Theatre Styles, World's Worst, Remote Control, American Musical
11	11	2 December 1988	Stephen Fry	Josie Lawrence	Enn Reitel	John Sessions
Games performed: Authors, Story, World's Worst, Props, Couples, Wrong Theme Tune, Rap
12	12	9 December 1988	N/A	N/A	N/A	N/A
Compilation 1. Games performed: Film and Theatre Styles, Every Other Line, Songstyles, Props, Film Dub, Party Quirks, Opera
13	13	16 December 1988	N/A	N/A	N/A	N/A
Compilation 2. Games performed: Film and Theatre Styles, Story, Rap, Songstyles, Party Quirks, Every Other Line, American Musical

=== Series 2 (1989–90) ===
No. overall	No. in series	Original air date	Performer 1	Performer 2	Performer 3	Performer 4	Performer 5	Performer 6
14	1	10 November 1989	Greg Proops	Josie Lawrence	Tony Slattery	Mike McShane	N/A	N/A
Games performed: Authors, Film and Theatre Styles, Songstyles, World's Worst, Rap, Explanations, American Musical
15	2	17 November 1989	Archie Hahn	Josie Lawrence	Tony Slattery	John Sessions	N/A	N/A
Games performed: Authors, Film and Theatre Styles, World's Worst, Sound Effects, Songstyles, Party Quirks
16	3	24 November 1989	Ron West	Griff Rhys Jones	Paul Merton	John Sessions	N/A	N/A
Games performed: Authors, Film and Theatre Styles, World's Worst, Props, Remote Control, Party Quirks
17	4	8 December 1989	Greg Proops	Josie Lawrence	Paul Rider	Mike McShane	N/A	N/A
Games performed: Authors, Film and Theatre Styles, Songstyles, World's Worst, Props, Party Quirks, American Musical
18	5	15 December 1989	Ryan Stiles	Sandi Toksvig	Tony Slattery	John Sessions	N/A	N/A
Games performed: Authors, Tag, Expert, World's Worst, Props, Party Quirks, Remote Control
19	6	22 December 1989	Ron West	Jimmy Mulville	Paul Merton	John Sessions	N/A	N/A
Games performed: Authors, Film and Theatre Styles, Interview, World's Worst, Props, Film Dub, Party Quirks
20	7	29 December 1989	Greg Proops	Josie Lawrence	Paul Merton	Sandi Toksvig	Tony Slattery	Mike McShane
Christmas Special. Games performed: Authors, Film and Theatre Styles, Songstyles, Rap, Party Quirks, World's Worst, Props, Musical Producers
21	8	5 January 1990	Ryan Stiles	Josie Lawrence	Neil Mullarkey	Mike McShane	N/A	N/A
Games performed: Film and Theatre Styles, Songstyles, World's Worst, Props, Film Dub, Party Quirks, American Musical
22	9	12 January 1990	Archie Hahn	Jonathan Pryce	Paul Merton	John Sessions	N/A	N/A
Games performed: Authors, Film and Theatre Styles, Props, Sound Effects, Interview, Film Dub, Party Quirks
23	10	20 January 1990	Lee Simpson	Jan Ravens	Tony Slattery	Mike McShane	N/A	N/A
Games performed: Authors, That Will Be Charlie Now, Film Dub, Songstyles, World's Worst, Props, Rap, Party Quirks, American Musical
24	11	26 January 1990	Josie Lawrence	Arthur Smith	Sandi Toksvig	Mike McShane	N/A	N/A
Games performed: Film and Theatre Styles, Film Dub, Songstyles, World's Worst, Props, Party Quirks, Musical Producers
25	12	9 February 1990	Mike McShane	Chris Langham	Sandi Toksvig	John Sessions	N/A	N/A
Games performed: Authors, Film and Theatre Styles, World's Worst, Props, Film Dub, Tag, Party Quirks
26	13	16 February 1990	Greg Proops	Josie Lawrence	Tony Slattery	John Sessions	N/A	N/A
Games performed: Film and Theatre Styles, Songstyles, World's Worst, Rap, Party Quirks, Advertisement, American Musical
27	14	23 February 1990	Ron West	Sandi Toksvig	Tony Slattery	Rory McGrath	N/A	N/A
Games performed: Authors, Film and Theatre Styles, Interview, World's Worst, Props, Film Dub, Party Quirks
28	15	2 March 1990	Josie Lawrence	Paul Merton	Tony Slattery	Mike McShane	N/A	N/A
Games performed: Authors, Film and Theatre Styles, Songstyles, World's Worst, Party Quirks, Rock Opera
29	16	9 March 1990	N/A	N/A	N/A	N/A	N/A	N/A
Compilation 1. Games performed: Film and Theatre Styles, Duet, That Will Be Charlie Now, Interview, Rap, Songstyles, Party Quirks, Film Dub, Musical Producers
30	17	16 March 1990	N/A	N/A	N/A	N/A	N/A	N/A
Compilation 2. Games performed: Film and Theatre Styles, Duet, Tag, Interview, Rap, Songstyles, Props, Film Dub, Party Quirks, American Musical

=== Series 3 (1991) ===
No. overall	No. in series	Original air date	Performer 1	Performer 2	Performer 3	Performer 4
31	1	18 January 1991	Josie Lawrence	Greg Proops	Jim Sweeney	Tony Slattery
Games performed: Authors, Alphabet, Songstyles, Props, Gospel, Helping Hands, Party Quirks, Expert Translation, Psychiatrist,
32	2	25 January 1991	Josie Lawrence	Mark Cohen	Tony Slattery	Mike McShane
Games performed: Film and Theatre Styles, Props, American Musical, World's Worst, Songstyles, Film Dub, Party Quirks, Gospel
33	3	1 February 1991	Mike McShane	Sandi Toksvig	Paul Merton	Jim Sweeney
Games performed: Film and Theatre Styles, Alphabet, Songstyles, Translate, March, Props, News Report, Helping Hands, Musical Producers
34	4	8 February 1991	Josie Lawrence	Paul Merton	Julian Clary	Mike McShane
Games performed: Film and Theatre Styles, Film Dub, Interview, Songstyles, Props, Alphabet, Expert Translation, Gospel
35	5	15 February 1991	Mike McShane	Colin Mochrie	Sandi Toksvig	Tony Slattery
Games performed: Film and Theatre Styles, Props, Helping Hands, Musical Producers, World's Worst, Songstyles, News Report, Alphabet, March
36	6	22 February 1991	Mike McShane	Josie Lawrence	Denalda Williams	Sandi Toksvig
Games performed: Emotion Option, Film and Theatre Styles, Expert Translation, Psychiatrist, Props, Songstyles, News Report, Alphabet, Gospel
37	7	1 March 1991	Mike McShane	Paul Merton	Steve Steen	Jim Sweeney
Games performed: Film and Theatre Styles, News Report, Expert Translation, Musical Film Review, Props, Helping Hands, Party Quirks, March
38	8	8 March 1991	Greg Proops	Sandi Toksvig	Tony Slattery	Mike McShane
Games performed: Film and Theatre Styles, Props, That Will Be Charlie Now, Gospel, World's Worst, Songstyles, One-Minute Alphabet, Party Quirks, Musical Film Review
39	9	15 March 1991	N/A	N/A	N/A	N/A
London Compilation. Games performed: Props, Duet, Tag, Songstyles, Film Dub, March, (Outtakes), Songstyles, World's Worst, Party Quirks, American Musical
40	10	22 March 1991	Josie Lawrence	Ryan Stiles	Christopher Smith	Jim Meskimen
Filmed in New York. Games performed: Film and Theatre Styles, Expert, Book Writer, Songstyles, Explanations, Party Quirks, Helping Hands, Hoedown
41	11	29 March 1991	Mike McShane	Mark Cohen	Greg Proops	John Sessions
Filmed in New York. Games performed: Authors, Film and Theatre Styles, World's Worst, Props, Songstyles, Party Quirks, Gospel
42	12	5 April 1991	Josie Lawrence	Ryan Stiles	Colin Mochrie	Mike McShane
Filmed in New York. Games performed: Film and Theatre Styles, World's Worst, Helping Hands, American Musical, Songstyles, Party Quirks, Props, March
43	13	12 April 1991	Christopher Smith	Sandi Toksvig	Jim Meskimen	Mike McShane
Filmed in New York. Games performed: Authors, Explanation, Film Dub, Songstyles, Party Quirks, Film and Theatre Styles, Gospel
44	14	19 April 1991	John Sessions	Archie Hahn	Ryan Stiles	Mike McShane
Filmed in New York. Games performed: Film and Theatre Styles, Songstyles, Sound Effects, World's Worst, Props, Audition, Helping Hands, Film Dub, Gospel
45	15	26 April 1991	Greg Proops	George McGrath	Ryan Stiles	Mike McShane
Filmed in New York. Games performed: Storyteller, Film and Theatre Styles, Props, Alphabet, Hoedown, Audition, Helping Hands, Party Quirks, Musical
46	16	3 May 1991	Josie Lawrence	Greg Proops	Sandi Toksvig	Mike McShane
Filmed in New York. Games performed: March, Alphabet, Tag, Psychiatrist, Props, Party Quirks, Film and Theatre Styles, American Musical
47	17	10 May 1991	N/A	N/A	N/A	N/A
New York Compilation. Games performed: Authors, Songstyles, News Report, Helping Hands, World's Worst, Psychiatrist, Expert, Party Quirks, Psychiatrist, Film Dub, Props, Rap

=== Series 4 (1992) ===
No. overall	No. in series	Original air date	Performer 1	Performer 2	Performer 3	Performer 4
48	1	24 January 1992	Jim Sweeney	Steve Steen	Stephen Frost	Tony Slattery
Games performed: Emotion Option, Film and Theatre Styles, Old Job / New Job, Courtroom Scene, World's Worst, Props, Party Quirks, Film Dub, Helping Hands, March
49	2	31 January 1992	Greg Proops	Paul Merton	Ryan Stiles	Josie Lawrence
Games performed: Film and Theatre Styles, Video Player, Scenes from a Hat, Expert, Party Quirks, Helping Hands, March
50	3	7 February 1992	Jim Sweeney	Paul Merton	Steve Steen	Tony Slattery
Games performed: Emotion Option, Film and Theatre Styles, Letter Changes, Film Dub, March, Props, Courtroom Scene, Helping Hands, Party Quirks, Scenes from a Hat
51	4	14 February 1992	Jim Sweeney	Stephen Frost	Josie Lawrence	Tony Slattery
Games performed: Film and Theatre Styles, Emotion Option, Helping Hands, Props, Old Job / New Job, Prison Visitor, Film Dub, Party Quirks, Scenes from a Hat
52	5	21 February 1992	Greg Proops	Ryan Stiles	Chip Esten	Tony Slattery
Games performed: Film and Theatre Styles, News Report, Film Dub, Scenes from a Hat, Props, Party Quirks, Helping Hands, Hoedown
53	6	28 February 1992	N/A	N/A	N/A	N/A
London Compilation. Games performed: Authors, Old Job / New Job, World's Worst, Narrate, Scene with a Prop, Psychiatrist, Props, Alphabet, Songstyles, Expert, Every Other Line, Hoedown
54	7	6 March 1992	Greg Proops	Ryan Stiles	Colin Mochrie	Brad Sherwood
Filmed in New York. Games performed: Emotion Option, Old Job / New Job, Props, Whose Line, Party Quirks, Scenes from a Hat, Sound Effects, Helping Hands, Superheroes
55	8	13 March 1992	Greg Proops	Archie Hahn	Ryan Stiles	Chip Esten
Filmed in New York. Games performed: Scenes from a Hat, Alphabet, Songstyles, Party Quirks, World's Worst, Bartender, Props, Film Dub, Helping Hands, Hoedown
56	9	20 March 1992	Ron West	Ryan Stiles	Colin Mochrie	Greg Proops
Filmed in New York. Games performed: Scenes from a Hat, Old Job / New Job, Questions Only, Party Quirks, Whose Line, World's Worst, Props, Helping Hands, Film Dub, Superheroes, Hoedown
57	10	27 March 1992	Sam Johnson	Jane Brucker	Ryan Stiles	Chip Esten
Filmed in New York. Games performed: Scenes from a Hat, Film and Theatre Styles, Expert, Whose Line, World's Worst, Props, Backwards Scene, Party Quirks, Helping Hands, Hoedown
58	11	3 April 1992	Jim Meskimen	Christopher Smith	Ryan Stiles	Chip Esten
Filmed in New York. Games performed: Film and Theatre Styles, Old Job / New Job, Props, Bartender, Expert, Characters, Party Quirks, Helping Hands, Scenes from a Hat
59	12	10 April 1992	Greg Proops	Ron West	Ryan Stiles	Brad Sherwood
Filmed in New York. Games performed: Emotion Option, Film and Theatre Styles, Scenes from a Hat, Whose Line, World's Worst, Props, Helping Hands, Superheroes, Old Job / New Job, Hoedown
60	13	17 April 1992	N/A	N/A	N/A	N/A
New York Compilation. Games performed: Film and Theatre Styles, Letter Changes, World's Worst, Expert, Bartender, Props, Alphabet, Film Dub, Superheroes, Hoedown

=== Series 5 (1993) ===
No. overall	No. in series	Original air date	Performer 1	Performer 2	Performer 3	Performer 4
61	1	5 March 1993	Greg Proops	Ryan Stiles	Colin Mochrie	Tony Slattery
Games performed: Scenes from a Hat, Film and Theatre Styles, Questions Only, Superheroes, World's Worst, Props, Scene To Music, Stand Sit Bend, Helping Hands, Hoedown
62	2	12 March 1993	Greg Proops	Russell Fletcher	Ryan Stiles	Josie Lawrence
Games performed: Film and Theatre Styles, Film Dub, Songstyles, World's Worst, Stand Sit Bend, Scene To Music, Party Quirks, Helping Hands, Hoedown
63	3	19 March 1993	Jim Sweeney	Steve Steen	Paul Merton	Tony Slattery
Games performed: Authors, Film and Theatre Styles, Foreign Film Dub, Scenes from a Hat, Props, Alphabet, Scene To Music, Party Quirks, March
64	4	26 March 1993	Greg Proops	Ryan Stiles	Colin Mochrie	Tony Slattery
Games performed: Film and Theatre Styles, Old Job / New Job, Film Dub, Sound Effects, World's Worst, Props, Scene To Music, Party Quirks, Helping Hands, Hoedown
65	5	2 April 1993	Greg Proops	Ryan Stiles	Josie Lawrence	Mike McShane
Games performed: Film and Theatre Styles, Songstyles, Whose Line, Stand Sit Bend, News Report, Song Titles, Party Quirks, Helping Hands, Musical
66	6	9 April 1993	Greg Proops	Ryan Stiles	Colin Mochrie	Josie Lawrence
Games performed: Scenes from a Hat, Whose Line, Songstyles, Superheroes, World's Worst, Props, Scene To Music, Film Dub, Helping Hands, Party Quirks
67	7	16 April 1993	Jim Sweeney	Steve Steen	Tony Slattery	Mike McShane
Games performed: Scenes from a Hat, Film and Theatre Styles, Authors, Songstyles, World's Worst, Props, Scene To Music, Party Quirks, Bartender
68	8	23 April 1993	Stephen Frost	Colin Mochrie	Ryan Stiles	Tony Slattery
Games performed: Film and Theatre Styles, Old Job / New Job, Whose Line, World's Worst, Props, Song Titles, Film Dub, Superheroes, Helping Hands
69	9	30 April 1993	N/A	N/A	N/A	N/A
Compilation. Games performed: Superheroes, Whose Line, Songstyles, Alphabet, Film Dub, Stand Sit Bend, Props, Questions Only, Party Quirks, Bartender

=== Series 6 (1994–95) ===
No. overall	No. in series	Original air date	Performer 1	Performer 2	Performer 3	Performer 4
70	1	1 July 1994	Stephen Frost	Colin Mochrie	Ryan Stiles	Tony Slattery
Games performed: Questions Only, Film and Theatre Styles, Film Dub, Song Titles, Stand Sit Lie, Sound Effects, Props, Moving People, Party Quirks, Helping Hands, Hoedown
71	2	8 July 1994	Josie Lawrence	Ryan Stiles	Greg Proops	Mike McShane
Games performed: Film and Theatre Styles, Old Job / New Job, Funeral, Stand Sit Lie, Props, Duet, Helping Hands, Party Quirks
72	3	15 July 1994	Stephen Frost	Colin Mochrie	Ryan Stiles	Tony Slattery
Games performed: Film and Theatre Styles, Old Job / New Job, Changing Emotions, Questions Only, Fixed Expression, Narrate, Film Dub, Party Quirks, Hoedown
73	4	22 July 1994	Mike McShane	Greg Proops	Ryan Stiles	Tony Slattery
Games performed: Superheroes, Song Titles, Film Dub, Alphabet, Songstyles, Film Trailer, Helping Hands, Party Quirks, Bartender
74	5	29 July 1994	Josie Lawrence	Stephen Frost	Ryan Stiles	Tony Slattery
Games performed: Film and Theatre Styles, Helping Hands, Hoedown, Props, Film Dub, Old Job / New Job, Bartender, Party Quirks
75	6	5 August 1994	Stephen Frost	Colin Mochrie	Ryan Stiles	Tony Slattery
Games performed: Questions Only, Whose Line, Stand Sit Lie, Old Job / New Job, Fixed Expressions, World's Worst, Props, Sound Effects, Party Quirks, Moving People, Hoedown
76	7	12 August 1994	Josie Lawrence	Rory Bremner	Tony Slattery	Mike McShane
Games performed: Scenes from a Hat, Sports Report, Film Dub, Prison Visitor, World's Worst, Props, Duet, Party Quirks, Helping Hands, Hoedown
77	8	19 August 1994	Greg Proops	Chip Esten	Ryan Stiles	Tony Slattery
Games performed: Scenes from a Hat, Superheroes, Songstyles, Sound Effects, News Report, Film Dub, Party Quirks, Stand Sit Lie, Bartender
78	9	26 August 1994	Greg Proops	Colin Mochrie	Ryan Stiles	Tony Slattery
Games performed: Questions Only, Old Job / New Job, Superheroes, Sound Effects, World's Worst, Props, Fixed Expression, Party Quirks, Helping Hands, Hoedown
79	10	2 September 1994	N/A	N/A	N/A	N/A
Compilation 1. Games performed: Film and Theatre Styles, News Report, Superheroes, Remote Control, Songstyles, Questions Only, Scene To Music, Film Dub, Helping Hands, Stand Sit Bend
80	11	6 January 1995	N/A	N/A	N/A	N/A
Compilation 2. Games performed: Scenes from a Hat, Film and Theatre Styles, Whose Line, Song Titles, Foreign Film Dub, Songstyles, Props, Film Trailer, Hoedown

=== Series 7 (1995) ===
No. overall	No. in series	Original air date	Performer 1	Performer 2	Performer 3	Performer 4
81	1	28 July 1995	Colin Mochrie	Ryan Stiles	Caroline Quentin	Tony Slattery
Games performed: Press Conference, Stand Sit Lie, Foreign Film Dub, Moving People, World's Worst, Picture, Narrate, Old Job / New Job, Helping Hands, Hoedown
82	2	4 August 1995	Stephen Frost	Josie Lawrence	Colin Mochrie	Ryan Stiles
Games performed: Superheroes, Fixed Expressions, Film Dub, Old Job / New Job, Narrate, Hats, Props, Sound Effects, Party Quirks, Psychiatrist
83	3	11 August 1995	Greg Proops	Colin Mochrie	Niall Ashdown	Ryan Stiles
Games performed: Questions Only, Film and Theatre Styles, Whose Line, Song Styles, Superheroes, Props, Animals, Backwards Scene, Film Dub, Party Quirks, Hoedown
84	4	18 August 1995	Greg Proops	Mike McShane	Ryan Stiles	Tony Slattery
Games performed: Film and Theatre Styles, Remote Control, Film Dub, Song Styles, World's Worst, Props, Scene To Music, News Report, Helping Hands, Hoedown
85	5	25 August 1995	Stephen Frost	Colin Mochrie	Ryan Stiles	Tony Slattery
Games performed: Film and Theatre Styles, Animals, Old Job / New Job, Press Conference, Hey You Down There, World's Worst, Courtroom Scene, Helping Hands, Party Quirks, Hoedown
86	6	1 September 1995	Stephen Frost	Eddie Izzard	Greg Proops	Ryan Stiles
Games performed: Remote Control, Film and Theatre Styles, Film Dub, Old Job / New Job, News Report, Props, Sound Effects, Film Trailer, Moving People, Party Quirks
87	7	8 September 1995	Greg Proops	Mike McShane	Ryan Stiles	Tony Slattery
Games performed: Film and Theatre Styles, Animals, Film Dub, Let's Make a Date, World's Worst, Props, Film Trailer, Party Quirks, Helping Hands
88	8	15 September 1995	Josie Lawrence	Caroline Quentin	Colin Mochrie	Ryan Stiles
Games performed: Film and Theatre Styles, Stand Sit Lie, Press Conference, Duet, Hats, Props, Party Quirks, Prison Visitor
89	9	22 September 1995	Mike McShane	Colin Mochrie	Ryan Stiles	Tony Slattery
Games performed: Superheroes, Secret, Foreign Film Dub, Sound Effects, Animals, Old Job / New Job, Party Quirks, Bartender
90	10	29 September 1995	Stephen Frost	Josie Lawrence	Colin Mochrie	Ryan Stiles
Games performed: Questions Only, Film and Theatre Styles, Secret, Greatest Hits, Stand Sit Lie, Foreign Film Dub, Moving People, Hoedown
91	11	24 December 1995	N/A	N/A	N/A	N/A
Compilation 1. Games performed: Film and Theatre Styles, Questions Only, Bartender, Scene to Music, Whose Line, World's Worst, Props, Narrate, "Extra Bits", Old Job / New Job, Stand Sit Bend, Hoedown
92	12	26 December 1995	N/A	N/A	N/A	N/A
Compilation 2. Games performed: Film and Theatre Styles, Questions Only, Song Styles, Scene To Music, Whose Line, World's Worst, Props, Narrate, Press Conference, Bartender, Party Quirks, Hoedown

=== Series 8 (1996) ===
No. overall	No. in series	Original air date	Performer 1	Performer 2	Performer 3	Performer 4
93	1	12 July 1996	Stephen Frost	Greg Proops	Colin Mochrie	Ryan Stiles
Games performed: Questions Only, Newsflash, Let's Make a Date, Hey You Down There, Hats, Props, Number of Words, Old Job/New Job, Dead Bodies, Hoedown
94	2	19 July 1996	Greg Proops	Rory Bremner	Colin Mochrie	Ryan Stiles
Games performed: Let's Make a Date, Secret, Film Dub, Sports Commentators, World's Worst, Home Shopping, Dead Bodies, Party Quirks, Hoedown
95	3	26 July 1996	Josie Lawrence	Caroline Quentin	Colin Mochrie	Ryan Stiles
Games performed: Film and Theatre Styles, Secret, Let's Make a Date, Duet, Hats, Picture, Party Quirks, Moving People, Hoedown
96	4	2 August 1996	Stephen Frost	Caroline Quentin	Colin Mochrie	Ryan Stiles
Games performed: Here He Is Now, Sound Effects, Film Dub, Secret, Number of Words, Hats, Props, Changing Emotions, Scene To Music, Animals, Foreign Film Dub
97	5	9 August 1996	Greg Proops	Niall Ashdown	Colin Mochrie	Ryan Stiles
Games performed: Superheroes, Secret, Song Styles, Changing Emotions, Number of Words, Director, Sports Commentators, Barroom Scene
98	6	16 August 1996	Greg Proops	Caroline Quentin	Colin Mochrie	Ryan Stiles
Games performed: Questions Only, Film and Theatre Styles, Here He Is Now, Props, Sound Effects, Let's Make a Date, Three of a Kind, Hats
99	7	23 August 1996	Greg Proops	Ardal O'Hanlon	Colin Mochrie	Ryan Stiles
Games performed: Film and Theatre Styles, Whose Line, Let's Make a Date, World's Worst, Mission: Impossible, Number of Words, Superheroes, Party Quirks
100	8	30 August 1996	Stephen Frost	Greg Proops	Colin Mochrie	Ryan Stiles
Games performed: Film and Theatre Styles, Sound Effects, Mission: Impossible, Home Shopping, Film Dub, Party Quirks, Moving People
101	9	6 September 1996	Niall Ashdown	Stephen Frost	Colin Mochrie	Ryan Stiles
Games performed: Questions Only, Film and Theatre Styles, Song Styles, Number of Words, Props, Sound Effects, Film Dub, Mission: Impossible, Party Quirks, Hoedown
102	10	13 September 1996	Stephen Frost	Josie Lawrence	Colin Mochrie	Ryan Stiles
Games performed: Questions Only, Film and Theatre Styles, Mission: Impossible, Props, Foreign Film Dub, Party Quirks, Psychiatrist
103	11	20 September 1996	Greg Proops	Rory Bremner	Colin Mochrie	Ryan Stiles
Games performed: Questions Only, Film and Theatre Styles, News Report, Picture, Stand/Sit/Bend, Props, Newsflash, Superheroes, Animals, Hats
104	12	6 December 1996	Josie Lawrence	Caroline Quentin	Colin Mochrie	Ryan Stiles
Games performed: Questions Only, Film and Theatre Styles, Foreign Film Dub, Props, Sound Effects, Press Conference, Fainting Bodies, Greatest Hits
105	13	13 December 1996	N/A	N/A	N/A	N/A
Compilation 1. Games performed: Questions Only, Film and Theatre Styles, Sound Effects, Song Styles, Fixed Expressions, World's Worst, Props, Whose Line, Newsflash, Superheroes, Greatest Hits
106	14	24 December 1996	N/A	N/A	N/A	N/A
Compilation 2. Games performed: Questions Only, Film and Theatre Styles, Let's Make a Date, Psychiatrist, Secret, Hats, Narrate, Press Conference, News Report, Helping Hands, Hoedown

=== Series 9 (1997–98) ===
No. overall	No. in series	Original air date	Performer 1	Performer 2	Performer 3	Performer 4
107	1	10 July 1997	Greg Proops	Rory Bremner	Colin Mochrie	Ryan Stiles
Games performed: Let's Make a Date, Animals, Weird Newscasters, World's Worst, Props, Newsflash, Mission: Impossible, Hoedown
108	2	17 July 1997	Greg Proops	Karen Maruyama	Colin Mochrie	Ryan Stiles
Games performed: Superheroes, Let's Make a Date, World's Worst, Dead Bodies, Mission: Impossible, Party Quirks, Hoedown
109	3	24 July 1997	Mike McShane	Brad Sherwood	Colin Mochrie	Ryan Stiles
Games performed: Questions Only, Sound Effects, Number of Words, Hoedown, Weird Newscasters, Party Quirks, Moving People, Greatest Hits
110	4	31 July 1997	Josie Lawrence	Stephen Fry	Colin Mochrie	Ryan Stiles
Games performed: Questions Only, Film & Theatre Styles, Sound Effects, Number of Words, Props, Let's Make a Date, Newsflash, Hoedown
111	5	7 August 1997	Greg Proops	Stephen Frost	Colin Mochrie	Ryan Stiles
Games performed: Superheroes, Film and Theatre Styles, Weird Newscasters, Moving People, Props, Party Quirks, Sports Commentators, Hoedown
112	6	14 August 1997	Stephen Frost	Colin Mochrie	Brad Sherwood	Ryan Stiles
Games performed: Superheroes, Song Styles, Secret, Addicts Anonymous, Sports Commentators, Film Dub, Animals, Weird Newcasters
113	7	21 August 1997	Greg Proops	George Wendt	Colin Mochrie	Ryan Stiles
Games performed: Film and Theatre Styles, Superheroes, Secret, Film Dub, World's Worst, Props, Three of a Kind, Party Quirks, Hoedown
114	8	28 August 1997	Greg Proops	Debi Durst	Colin Mochrie	Ryan Stiles
Games performed: Questions Only, Superheroes, Let's Make a Date, Animals, World's Worst, Props, Weird Newscasters, Moving People, Hoedown
115	9	4 September 1997	Stephen Frost	Colin Mochrie	Brad Sherwood	Ryan Stiles
Games performed: Questions Only, Film and Theatre Styles, Old Job/New Job, Home Shopping, Quick Change, Party Quirks, Mission: Impossible, Greatest Hits
116	10	11 September 1997	Stephen Frost	Colin Mochrie	Brad Sherwood	Ryan Stiles
Games performed: Questions Only, Sound Effects, Let's Make a Date, Remember That Song, Press Conference, Narrate, Party Quirks, Hoedown
117	11	18 September 1997	N/A	N/A	N/A	N/A
Compilation 1. Games performed: Questions Only, Film and Theatre Styles, Let's Make a Date, Song Titles, Song Styles, Sports Commentators, Daytime Talk Show, Director, Song Styles(2)
118	12	24 December 1997	N/A	N/A	N/A	N/A
Compilation 2. Games performed: Film and Theatre Styles, Quick Change, Sound Effects, Animals, Song Styles, Backwards Scene, Home Shopping, Three of a Kind, Party Quirks, Moving People, Hoedown
119	13	22 April 1998	Greg Proops	Stephen Frost	Colin Mochrie	Ryan Stiles
Games performed: Film and Theatre Styles, Let's Make a Date, Hey You Down There, Hats, Number of Words, Newsflash, Addicts Anonymous, Hoedown
120	14	29 April 1998	Greg Proops	Karen Maruyama	Colin Mochrie	Ryan Stiles
Games performed: Questions Only, Sound Effects, Film and Theatre Styles, Sports Commentators, Props, Home Shopping, Soap Opera, News Report
121	15	6 May 1998	Stephen Frost	Colin Mochrie	Brad Sherwood	Ryan Stiles
Games performed: Superheroes, Let's Make a Date, Secret, Foreign Film Dub, Props, Song Styles, Film Dub, Sports Commentators, Hoedown
122	16	13 May 1998	Greg Proops	George Wendt	Colin Mochrie	Ryan Stiles
Games performed: Film and Theatre Styles, Old Job/New Job, Let's Make a Date, Foreign Film Dub, Press Conference, Weird Newscasters, Mission: Impossible
123	17	20 May 1998	Greg Proops	Rory Bremner	Colin Mochrie	Ryan Stiles
Games performed: Film and Theatre Styles, Press Conference, Sound Effects, Film Review, Secret, Picture, Party Quirks, Hoedown
124	18	27 May 1998	Greg Proops	Josie Lawrence	Colin Mochrie	Ryan Stiles
Games performed: Let's Make a Date, Sound Effects, Hoedown, Hats, Mission: Impossible, Greatest Hits
125	19	19 September 1998	Stephen Frost	Colin Mochrie	Brad Sherwood	Ryan Stiles
Games performed: Film and Theatre Styles, Interrogation, Stand/Sit/Bend, World's Worst, Props, Number of Words, Foreign Film Dub, Greatest Hits

=== Series 10 (1998–99) ===
All episodes filmed in Hollywood

No. overall	No. in series	Original air date	Performer 1	Performer 2	Performer 3	Performer 4
126	1	11 November 1998	Brad Sherwood	Wayne Brady	Colin Mochrie	Ryan Stiles
Games performed: Let's Make a Date, Duet, Quiz Show, Scene to Rap, Whose Line, Daytime Talk Show, Greatest Hits
127	2	18 November 1998	Greg Proops	Phil LaMarr	Colin Mochrie	Ryan Stiles
Games performed: Let's Make a Date, Secret, Quiz Show, Press Conference, Props, Multiple Personalities, Weird Newscasters, Hoedown
128	3	25 November 1998	Greg Proops	Karen Maruyama	Colin Mochrie	Ryan Stiles
Games performed: Questions Only, Quiz Show, Film Dub, Hats, Weird Newscasters, Party Quirks, Daytime Talk Show
129	4	2 December 1998	Patrick Bristow	Wayne Brady	Colin Mochrie	Ryan Stiles
Games performed: Let's Make a Date, Song Styles, Secret, Daytime Talk Show, Props, Party Quirks, Greatest Hits
130	5	9 December 1998	Greg Proops	Brad Sherwood	Colin Mochrie	Ryan Stiles
Games performed: Superheroes, Sound Effects, Quiz Show, Hey You Down There, World's Worst, Props, Three of a Kind, Scene To Rap, Weird Newscasters
131	6	16 December 1998	Greg Proops	Catherine O'Hara	Colin Mochrie	Ryan Stiles
Games performed: Let's Make a Date, Home Shopping, Hats, Daytime Talk Show, Props, Foreign Film Dub, Party Quirks, Hoedown
132	7	6 January 1999	Greg Proops	Phil LaMarr	Colin Mochrie	Ryan Stiles
Games performed: Let's Make a Date, Animals, Daytime Talk Show, World's Worst, Props, Strange Bedfellows, Moving People, Weird Newscasters
133	8	14 January 1999	Brad Sherwood	Wayne Brady	Colin Mochrie	Ryan Stiles
Games performed: Daytime Talk Show, Duet, Quiz Show, Scene To Rap, Weird Newscasters, Animals, Greatest Hits
134	9	21 January 1999	Brad Sherwood	Debra Wilson	Colin Mochrie	Ryan Stiles
Games performed: Superheroes, Sound Effects, Let's Make a Date, Scene to Rap, Backwards Scene, Foreign Film Dub, Animals, Greatest Hits
135	10	28 January 1999	N/A	N/A	N/A	N/A
Compilation 1. Games performed: Film and Theatre Styles, Superheroes, Sound Effects, Weird Newscasters, Quick Change, Secret, Mission: Impossible, Gospel
136	11	4 February 1999	N/A	N/A	N/A	N/A
Compilation 2. Games performed: Questions Only, Sound Effects, Stand/Sit/Bend, Weird Newscasters, Charity Anthem, This is the Story of Your Life, Home Shopping, Animals, Hoedown

=== Comic Relief Specials (1989/2011) ===
No. special	Original air date	Performer 1	Performer 2	Performer 3	Performer 4	Performer 5
1	10 March 1989	Stephen Fry	Josie Lawrence	Paul Merton	John Sessions	N/A
Games performed: Authors, Props
2	6 March 2011	Josie Lawrence	Neil Mullarkey	Tony Slattery	Humphrey Ker	David Walliams
Games performed: Stand Sit Bend, Party Quirks, Alphabet, Props, Song Styles, Foreign Film Dub, Film & Theatre Styles, Hoedown
