= Paul Merton's Impro Chums =

Paul Merton's Impro Chums is an improvisational comedy stage show, consisting of comedian Paul Merton heading a cast of Richard Vranch, Suki Webster, Mike McShane and Lee Simpson, as well as a special guest performer.

The show is in a similar format to that given by the Comedy Store Players and its television counterpart, Whose Line Is It Anyway?. The performers act scenes which are suggested by the theatre audience. They perform without scripts, autocue or props, and rely on their wit and speed of thought to create amusing scenarios with the given characters.

Many guests have appeared on the show, including Neil Mullarkey, and Josie Lawrence.
