= Whose Line Is It Anyway? =

Improvisational radio and TV comedy show

- Created by: Dan Patterson; Mark Leveson
- Original work: Whose Line Is It Anyway? (radio series) (1988)
- Owner: Hat Trick Productions
- Years: 1988–present

Films and television
- Television series: Whose Line Is It Anyway? (British TV series) (1988–1999); Whose Line Is It Anyway? (American TV series) (1998–2007, 2013–2024); Whose Line Is It Anyway? Australia (2016–2017); Shel Mi HaShura HaZot? (2000–2001, 2006–2007); De Lama's (2004–2008)

Audio
- Radio program(s): Whose Line Is It Anyway? (1988)

Miscellaneous
- Genre: Improvisational comedy

Whose Line Is It Anyway? is a short-form improvisational comedy show created by Dan Patterson and Mark Leveson. The three major versions of the show are the original 1988 British radio programme (from which all subsequent versions are adapted), the British television programme, which ran from 1988 to 1999, and the American television programme, which ran from 1998 to 2007 and was revived in 2013. All three versions were produced by Patterson and Leveson and have a continuity of cast (for example, both the British radio and television shows were hosted by Clive Anderson, while several performers from the British television show then starred in the American television show).

Each version of the show consists of a panel of four performers who create characters, scenes, and songs on the spot, in the style of short-form improvisation games, many taken from theatresports. Topics for the games are based on either audience suggestions or predetermined prompts from the host. The show ostensibly takes the form of a game show, with the host arbitrarily assigning points and likewise choosing a winner at the end of each episode.

== Versions, adaptations and similar shows ==
Title	Translation	Format	Years	Nationality	Aired On	Status	Description
Whose Line Is It Anyway?	—N/a	Radio	1988	UK	BBC Radio 4	Official	The British radio series which inspired the television series
Whose Line Is It Anyway?	—N/a	TV	1988–1999	UK	Channel 4	Official	
Whose Line Is It Anyway?	—N/a	TV	1998–2007, 2013–2024	US	ABC, The CW	Official	
Whose Line Is It Anyway?	—N/a	TV	2016–2017	Australia		Official	
Shel Mi HaShura HaZot? (של מי השורה הזאת)	Whose Line Is It?	TV	2000–2001, 2006–2007	Israel	Channel 2	Official	
aldawr ealaa min? (الدور على مين؟)		TV	2018–	Egypt	TeN TV	Official	
Sponk!	—N/a	TV	2001–2003	US	Noggin	Adaptation	Was aimed at a younger audience and featured child performers playing games similar to Whose Line? games.
De Lama's		TV	2004–2008	Netherlands		Adaptation	Besides a number of games from Whose Line Is It Anyway?, the show used a lot of new games. The show won several prizes and was one of the most watched shows on Dutch television.
Lo Kar Lo Baat		TV		India		Adaptation	Most of the games were taken from the original.
Imps		Theater	2005–	India		Adaptation	A frequent theatre production similar to Whose Line Is It Anyway?, started by Divya Palat.
Onvoorziene Omstandigheden	Unforeseen Circumstances	TV	1994–1995	Belgium	één	Adaptation	A similar programme was made, presented by Mark Uytterhoeven.
Frei Schnauze		TV	2006–2008	Germany		Adaptation	This version of the UK original entertained its audience with many similar games. The show started as a half-hour programme and expanded to one hour in 2006. The host was the German comedian Dirk Bach.
Schillerstraße		TV		Germany		Adaptation	Featuring many well-known German comedians.
Hatten Rundt		TV		Denmark		Adaptation	Featured a setup very similar to that of Whose Line?, with much more emphasis on acting and much less on wild comedy.
Minus Manus		TV		Norway	Norwegian TV3	Adaptation	Shown on was more or less identical in tone and form to the British show.
Spinn		TV		Norway	TVNorge	Adaptation	Had a slightly different set-up, split the contestants into two competing teams (the green team and the orange team, both wearing appropriately-colored T-shirts) and also heavily involved a rotating stage that provided scenery and props for the various improvised skits. Though the shows were completely separate, many of the contestants (such as Helén Vikstvedt), featured on both.
Wild 'n Out		TV		US	MTV	Adaptation	Hosted by Nick Cannon, this is a hip-hop version of the show with guest stars (among them Wayne Brady from the US adaptation) and hip-hop performances. It is also derived from ComedySportz.
Whose Pie Is It Anyway?	—N/a	TV		Australia		Spoof	An unofficial, short-lived Australian version of the programme was created by comedy troupe The T Team. This was a spoof of the British and U.S. versions of the programme.
Anında Görüntü Show	Immediate Vision Show	TV		Turkey		Adaptation	Although there are some differences in the format, it is still very close to the original Whose Line Is It Anyway?. Players include: Ayça Işıldar Ak, Ayhan Taş, Burak Satıbol, Dilek Çelebi, Özlem Türay and Yiğit Arı.
Tsotskhali Show	Live Show	TV		Georgia		Adaptation	This show is a copy of the original with minor changes..
Pagauk kampą	Catch The Corner Get It Quick	TV		Lithuania		Adaptation	Quite a successful Lithuanian copy of Whose Line? with similar rules and games.
Kamikaze		Radio	early 2000s	French-Canadian	Radio-Canada	Adaptation	The only airings of the show were unannounced and used as a replacement after the sitcom Catherine went on hiatus during the holidays. The show was almost identical to the U.S. version, using the same set and playing similar games such as "Old Job New Job."
L'audition	The Audition		2006	Quebec, Canada	TQS	Adaptation	The concept of the show was based on the WLIIA game "Hollywood Director," where the host played the director. Every week, three guests from the Québec pop-culture were invited to improvise various scenes and games such as a fake cooking show or a modified version of "Scenes From a Hat." TQS decided to cancel the show due to three months of poor ratings.
Beugró:	Stand-In	TV	2007	Hungarian	Magyar Televízió, Cool TV	Adaptation	The pilot aired New Year's Night, 2007. The show consists of four actors playing improvisational games. The games are slightly differ from the original Whose Line games, and the show introduces some new games as well (like a hook-word which has to be used through the show as many times as the performers can). The show was successfully aired on Hungarian national public service television, but one year later passed to Cool TV due to financial reasons.
Black fish	—N/a			Pakistan		Live Adaptation	This show was carried out live in Karachi by four performers who more or less played the same games as were seen on the American version of the show.
Actorlympics TV	—N/a	TV		Malaysia	NTV7	Adaptation	
Super Spontan	super spontaneous	TV	2012, 2013, 2014, 2016, 2017, 2018	Malaysia	astro warna, astro warna hd, astro mustika hd	similar	
mega spontan	mega spontaneous	TV	2023	Malaysia	astro warna	similar	this show is the continuation of the show super spontan
Quinta Categoria		TV	2008–2011	Brazil	MTV Brasil	Adaptation	Starting with 2009 it incorporated similar games to the original Whose Line is it Anyway? This show, in its improvisational format, was carried out by four players: Marcos Mion and the three members of theatrical comedy group Cia. Barbixas de Humor: Anderson Bizzocchi, Daniel Nascimento and Elidio Sanna. Sometimes a fifth member, Mionzinho (Victor Coelho), would join the games. There is also a special guest who suggests the rules of the last game of the show. For the 2010 and 2011 seasons, the format was maintained, but with a different cast of comedians consisting of Tatá Werneck, Paulinho Serra and Rodrigo Capella, plus one guest host every week.
É Tudo Improviso		TV	2010–2011, 2019	Brazil	Rede Bandeirantes	Adaptation	Spiritual successor of Quinta Categoria. Presented by Márcio Ballas, it had a format more similar to the Barbixas group's theater shows (they themselves appeared only in the first season of this format).
I kto to mówi?	And who says it?	TV	2013	Poland	TVP2	Adaptation	Close adaptation of the original show with minor changes only.
Partička				Slovakia	Markíza	Adaptation	
'สายของมันอยู่ดี'				Thailand		Adaptation	
Vedetään hatusta				Finland	MTV3	Adaptation	
