= Harry Fielder =

English actor (1940–2021)

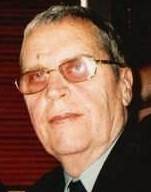
- Fielder in 2008
- Born: Henry Arthur Fielder; 26 April 1940; London, England
- Died: 6 February 2021 (aged 80)
- Years active: 1967–1999
- Spouse: Mary Fielder (m. 1963; died 2010)
- Website: harryfielder.co.uk

Henry Arthur Fielder (26 April 1940 – 6 February 2021), sometimes credited as Harry H. Fielder or Harry Aitch Fielder, was an English actor who worked extensively in British film and television from the 1960s to the 1990s.

== Career ==
Fielder was born in Islington, London. He appeared as an extra in many American films due to filming taking place partly or entirely in Britain. His film credits include Oliver!, Star Wars: A New Hope, McVicar, and Highlander.

He appeared as an extra in a wide range of TV shows including Doctor Who, Blake's 7, Shoestring, The Sweeney, Minder and The Professionals.

Fielder co-presented CBTV, a Thames TV programme for younger viewers, in the 1980s where he played the Security Guard, Harry, who Jim Sweeney and Steve Steen would have to sneak past at the gates of Teddington Studios.

== Personal life ==
In 2012, Fielder published his autobiography Extra Extra, Read All About It!: My Life as a Film and TV Extra.

Fielder died on 6 February 2021 at the age of 80.

== Filmography ==
=== Film ===
Year	Title	Role	Notes
1967	Quatermass and the Pit	Workman; Possessed man	Uncredited
1967	The Dirty Dozen	French Waiter	Uncredited
1968	Oliver!	Smart gentleman	Uncredited
1970	Cromwell	Man in Parliament	Uncredited
1970	Trog	Security Guard	Uncredited
1972	Carry On Abroad	Monk	Uncredited
1972	Mutiny on the Buses	Bus Driver	Uncredited
1973	Holiday on the Buses	Busman	Uncredited
1977	Star Wars Episode IV: A New Hope	Corporal Grenwick, Death Star trooper	Uncredited
1978	The Thirty Nine Steps	Policeman	Uncredited
1978	Superman	Policeman	Uncredited
1980	Superman II	Cop	Uncredited
1981	Raiders of the Lost Ark	German soldier	Uncredited
1981	Take It or Leave It	Barman	Uncredited
1984	Top Secret!	German guard	Uncredited
1986	Highlander	Hospital guard	Uncredited
1995	Mary Reilly	Bearded man	Uncredited
1995	First Knight	Villager	Uncredited
1996	Loch Ness	Reporter	Uncredited
1996	Mission: Impossible	Car driver	Uncredited
1996	101 Dalmatians	Passerby	Uncredited
1996	Evita	Crowd member	Uncredited
1997	Incognito	Prison warder	Uncredited
1997	Wilde	Courtroom member	Uncredited
1997	The Man Who Knew Too Little	Photographer	Uncredited
1997	FairyTale: A True Story	Houdini's stagehand	Uncredited
1997	The Jackal	American cop on roof	Uncredited
1999	Entrapment	Stallholder	Uncredited

=== Television ===
Year	Title	Role	Notes
1967–1977	Z-Cars	PC and others	6 episodes
1967–1982	Doctor Who	Guard, Crewmember, Vogan, Assassin, Titan Base Crewman, Levithian Guard, Tigellan Guard	14 episodes
1976–77	Space: 1999	Medic and others	7 episodes, uncredited
1977	Survivors	Larry	1 episode, The Peacemaker
1977–79	Secret Army	Candide Patron, German POW and Tim Wooldridge	5 episodes, uncredited
1978–1981	Blake's 7	Federation Trooper and others	10 episodes
1979–1982	Minder	Wedding guest and others	3 episodes, uncredited
1979	Fawlty Towers	Laundry van driver	1 episode, The Kipper and the Corpse, uncredited
1980	A Tale of Two Cities	Gaoler	2 episodes
1981	Yes Minister	Hitman	1 episode, The Death List, uncredited
1982	Beau Geste	Legionnaire	4 episodes, TV mini-series
1983	The Optimist	Man in street	1 episode, The Light Fantastic
1985–1995	EastEnders	Cafe Customer and others	3 episodes
1987	The Diary of Anne Frank	Vegetable man	2 episodes, credited as Harry Aitch Fielder
1987–1991	The Bill	Man at Council Estate and others	4 episodes
1990–93	London's Burning	Barman and Pub Landlord	2 episodes
