= The Comedy Store Players =

Comedy troupe in London

The Comedy Store Players are a group of improvisational comedians who perform at The Comedy Store in London. The group first came into being in October 1985. The group celebrated its 40th anniversary in 2025.

== The Players ==
Members of the group have included:

- Dave Cohen
- Jeremy Hardy
- Kit Hollerbach
- Josie Lawrence
- Paul Merton
- Neil Mullarkey
- Mike Myers
- Lee Simpson
- Andy Smart
- Jim Sweeney
- Sandi Toksvig
- Richard Vranch

Currently there are five regular cast members: Josie Lawrence, Neil Mullarkey, Lee Simpson, Richard Vranch and Ruth Bratt, who in 2024 became the first new permanent member of the Players in almost 30 years. Sweeney retired from performing in 2008 but is still listed as a member and is also the group's President. Paul Merton ceased appearing as a full-time member in 2020 in order to concentrate on Paul Merton's Impro Chums but makes occasional appearances as a guest performer.

The Comedy Store Players was in the Guinness World Records in 2010 for being the world’s longest-running comedy show with the same cast. This was a new Guinness award.

== Shows ==
The Players currently perform once a week on Sunday at The Comedy Store, but in recent times performed once each on Wednesdays and Sundays.

Performances are usually with the regular cast, although occasionally a guest performer will appear. Guests have in the past included the likes of Niall Ashdown, Marcus Brigstocke, Stephen Frost, Eddie Izzard, Greg Proops, Steve Steen and Phill Jupitus. Shows start at 7.30pm on Sundays. They last approximately 2 hours (including interval), in which time they play 6 or 7 games. There is no one host of the show, and no points to be won; players rotate the introduction and performing duties.

Usually, the games are:

- Whoops - in which each performer takes turn to tell a story, with the audience shouting "Whoops!" when one makes a mistake. The game was formerly called "Die!"
- Freeze Tag - two performers start in positions suggested by the audience, and act out sketches. The other performers will 'tag' someone to take their position and start a new sketch
- Guess The Job - A Player leaves the room while an outrageous job is concocted. When he re-enters, he/she has to guess the job based on clues dropped into the sketch
- Translation - Specialist lecture from a foreign expert who doesn't speak English, so another Player translates for him
- Film & Theatre Styles - A sketch between 2 people, performed in different film and theatre styles
- Musical - A story told with song, with the Players often playing several characters
- Emotions - Another sketch between 2 people, this time changing based on different emotions suggested by the audience
- The Three Headed Expert - An interview between one person and an expert (played by three people)

Aside from The Comedy Store in London, the Comedy Store Players perform annually at Shakespeare's Globe as well as other venues around the UK. From 2000 to 2003 they performed regularly at the Manchester Comedy Store and for many years appeared at Regent's Park Open Air Theatre. They held national tours of the UK in 1990, 1991 and 2003, and toured India in 2004.

== Appearances ==
The Comedy Store Players performed improvised games in episodes of STV's stand-up series Funny Farm (1990-1993). They also appeared on episode 4 of The Sitcom Trials - the line-up consisted of Neil Mullarkey, Suki Webster, Niall Ashdown and Richard Vranch.

Several of the Players appeared on the Channel 4 comedy game show Whose Line Is It Anyway?. Lawrence, Merton, Simpson and Sweeney also starred in The Masterson Inheritance, an improvised comedy series which ran on BBC Radio 4 from 1993-1995.
