= All the Young Dudes (radio show) =

BBC Radio comedy drama series

- Genre: Radio drama
- Running time: 35 minutes
- Country of origin: United Kingdom
- Language: English
- Home station: BBC Radio 4
- Starring: Jim Sweeney; Cathryn Harrison; Steve Steen; Sadie Shimmin; Stephen Frost; Flaminia Cinque; Izzy De Rosario
- Written by: Jim Sweeney
- Original release: July 2001 – October 2002
- No. of episodes: 12

All the Young Dudes is a radio comedy drama series that aired from July 2001 to October 2002. There were twelve thirty-five-minutes episodes and it was broadcast on BBC Radio 4. It was written by and starred Jim Sweeney.

== Overview ==
Based on Sweeney's first play, Danny's Wake, which won a Fringe First in Edinburgh and a Granada Media Comedy Writing Award, All the Young Dudes follows the lives of Patrick and his friends and family. Whilst the play was essentially a black comedy in which two old friends spend a night alone at a wake where alcohol makes truth and lies indistinguishable, All The Young Dudes keeps the same themes, but is far more light hearted. Sweeney blends nostalgia through flashbacks and music to create well-rounded characters and an engaging sense of community.

When Patrick (an out of work teacher) and his wife Helen (a high flying businesswoman) move back to the town where Patrick grew up, he bumps into old school friends and reminisces over their childhood. Although Patrick looks back at his school days with some affection, it appears that things were not always as they seemed. However, Billy and Moira (the divorced couple who live next door to each other), Helen and Patrick and local pub owners, Joe and Maria build up firm friendships and a sense of community develops.

== Cast ==
- Patrick - Jim Sweeney
- Helen - Cathryn Harrison
- Billy - Steve Steen
- Moira - Sadie Shimmin
- Joe - Stephen Frost
- Maria - Flaminia Cinque
- Charlie - Izzy De Rosario
