= Dave Cohen (writer) =

Comedian and writer

- Occupations: Comedian, novelist and writer for television and radop
- Known for: Founding member of the Comedy Store Players; co-writer of Horrible Histories songs

Dave Cohen is a novelist, comedian and writer for television and radio. He was a founding member of the Comedy Store Players in 1985 with Paul Merton, Mike Myers, Kit Hollerbach and Neil Mullarkey, and is best known for his BAFTA-winning Horrible Histories songs co-written with Richie Webb. Cohen is also thought to be the originator of the phrase "comedy is the new rock'n'roll".

== Career ==
=== Performing ===
Cohen began performing as a comic folk singer in the north of England in the mid-1970s, while still at school. He moved to Bristol and became involved with the local punk scene, supporting local bands including The Cortinas and Shoes For Industry and setting up Wavelength Records, which became Bristol Recorder and, after he left, WOMAD.

In 1983, he moved to London and became a stand-up comedian, winning a nomination for the Edinburgh Comedy Awards in 1984 for Tuxedo Junta, which he wrote and performed with Paul B. Davies.

Cohen went on to co-found The Comedy Store Players and was a member of Comedy Store Cutting Edge. From 1994 to 2000, he occasionally performed as lead singer with Al Murray and Jim Tavare in the world's first Jewish heavy metal group "Guns'n'Moses". After nearly a decade of absence, he returned to perform in My Life As A Footnote and, in 2012, performed Songs in A Flat.

=== Writing ===
Cohen is a prolific writer for television and radio as well as contributing columns to NME, Chortle and The Huffington Post.

He has written for BBC Radio 4 including The Best of British, Dead Ringers which won a Sony Gold Award 2001, The Sunday Format, The News Quiz and 15 Minute Musical which he was also a co-creator and won the 2009 Writer's Guild Best Radio Comedy Show, to name a few. He also wrote for BBC Radio 5's The Treatment and wrote and presented his own documentaries They Came From Nowhere, I Want to Give Up Driving and It's About Time.

Cohen has written for a number of television shows including the Rory Bremner Show, Spitting Image, Eleven O'Clock Show, Not Going Out and My Family. He has been a long-time writer for Have I Got News For You and for Horrible Histories, which has won a variety of awards including Best Sketch Show, Best Comedy Show at the Children's BAFTAs and Best British Comedy Show.

He was a columnist for NME/The Face in 1984–85, The Guardian in 2009 and has been writing for The Huffington Post since 2011.

He has been largely credited with inventing the phrase "comedy is the new rock'n'roll".

=== Theatre, film and television performance ===
In television, Cohen has acted in 15 Storeys High and Sixty Six and in 2004 was in Suzie Gold.

=== Radio ===
From 1991 through to 1999, Cohen contributed to BBC Radio 1's Loose Talk and Songlines, of which he was co-creator. He was also a recurring guest for BBC Radio 4's Loose Ends. His own series, Travels with My Anti Semitism, appeared in 2000.

=== Novels ===
His first novel, Stand Up, Barry Goldman, was published in June 2021.

The follow-up book, Barry Goldman: The Wilderness Years, was published in November 2023. New editions of both these books will be published in September 2025.

The final book in the trilogy will be published in January 2026.
