= Shel Mi HaShura HaZot? =

- Also known as: Whose Line Is It?
- Presented by: Shlomo Bar-Aba; Idan Alterman
- Country of origin: Israel
- Original language: Hebrew
- No. of seasons: 4

Original release
- Network: Channel 2

Shel Mi HaShura HaZot? (Hebrew: של מי השורה הזאת, lit. Whose Line Is It?) is an Israeli version of the British improvisational comedy television program Whose Line Is It Anyway?. It aired for four seasons: two seasons from 2000 to 2001 on Channel 2, hosted by Shlomo Baraba; and another two seasons from 2006 to 2007 on Channel 10, hosted by Idan Alterman. The show consists of a panel of four performers who create scenes on the spot.

== Cast ==
First and second seasons

- Shlomo Bar-Aba (host)
- Dror Keren
- Shira Alon
- Alon Neuman
- Roi Levy
- Sharon Teicher
- Tomer Sharon ("Tomasz")

Third and fourth seasons

- Idan Alterman (host)
- Tomer Sharon ("Tomasz")
- Shmulik Levy
- Elinor Rock
- Maor Cohen
- Yael Leventhal

== See also ==
- Mishak Makhur
