= Jim Sweeney (comedian) =

English actor and comedian (born 1956)

- Born: Michael James Dominic Sweeney; 7 February 1956 (age 70); Bournemouth, England
- Occupations: Actor, comedian
- Children: 2

Michael James Dominic Sweeney (born 7 February 1956; Bournemouth, England) is an English actor and comedian, best known for his improvisation partnership with Steve Steen. In 2001 and 2002, he wrote the 2-series sitcom All The Young Dudes for BBC Radio 4, in which he acted with Steen and Stephen Frost as three schoolmates re-uniting in later life, with each episode titled after a hit from the 1970s.

== Life and career ==
When Sweeney was 11 years old, he moved to London with his parents, along with two brothers and a sister. He became interested in theatre and improvisation while attending Clapham College, an all-boys Roman Catholic school. Sweeney spent the 1970s in theatre productions, creating and touring shows with Steve Steen, who was a friend from school. The pairing's first television work as a duo came on the ITV children's show CBTV, followed by the Channel 4 comedy Little Armadillos and resident support comic slots on Rory Bremner's first sketch show for the BBC. In 1987, Sweeney played Samuel Taylor Coleridge in an episode of Blackadder the Third, with Steve Steen alongside him as Lord Byron. He also starred as "The Head" in the first season of Art Attack in 1990. He then appeared in commercials and radio comedies before acquiring a semi-regular slot as a contestant on the Channel 4 improvisation show Whose Line Is It Anyway? from 1991 to 1993. Steve Steen also occasionally appeared on Whose Line alongside Sweeney.

Sweeney has been in a number of radio plays and sitcoms, including a lead role in Any Bloke alongside Caroline Quentin and Steve Steen. He adapted his award-winning play Danny's Wake into a radio series, All The Young Dudes, in which he (and Steen) co-starred. Sweeney has authored a number of plays in addition to Danny's Wake, namely Sick Transit, Cabin Fever, and My MS and Me. Sweeney has been involved with the Comedy Store's Comedy Store Players team since 1992, performing with Paul Merton, Josie Lawrence, Neil Mullarkey, Lee Simpson, Andy Smart and Richard Vranch. He has also appeared in numerous radio series, including the improvised faux drama show The Masterson Inheritance and BBC Radio 4's Just a Minute. He made guest appearances in sitcoms Kiss Me Kate and One Foot In The Grave (the latter as a computer salesman memorably humiliated by Victor Meldrew).

Since 1985, Sweeney has had multiple sclerosis, something which has required use of a walking stick and, from 2005, a wheelchair. Sweeney wrote about his experiences of multiple sclerosis in My MS and Me, a play he performed for BBC Radio 4 after a successful Edinburgh Festival run. In 2008, the disease meant he gave up appearing on stage, but he continues to be listed as a member of the Comedy Store Players. In 2007, he made two series of BBC Radio 4's improvised sketch show The Lawrence Sweeney Mix with Josie Lawrence.
