= Archie Hahn =

Archie Hahn may refer to:

- Archie Hahn (actor) (born 1941), American actor
- Archie Hahn (sprinter) (1880–1955), American track athlete and coach
