= Four Fathers =

- Genre: Drama
- Written by: Bill Gallagher
- Directed by: Dermot Boyd
- Starring: Tony Doyle; Tom Bell; Neil Dudgeon; Stuart McQuarrie; Ruth Gemmell; Eva Pope; Jacquetta May; Kate Lonergan; Emma Williams
- Composer: Alan Clark
- Country of origin: United Kingdom
- Original language: English
- No. of series: 1
- No. of episodes: 3

Production
- Executive producer: Sally Head
- Producers: Martyn Auty; Carol Wilks
- Production locations: Sheffield, South Yorkshire, England, UK
- Cinematography: Kevin Rowley
- Editor: Richard Milward
- Running time: 50 minutes (eps. 1–2); 100 minutes (ep. 3)
- Production company: Sally Head Productions

Original release
- Network: ITV
- Release: 9 December – 21 December 1999

Four Fathers is a British television drama miniseries written by Bill Gallagher, comprising two fifty-minute episodes and one one-hundred minute episode, that first broadcast on ITV between 9 and 21 December 1999. The drama serial focused on a quartet of four very different fathers living in a northern town who all have life changing experiences in store. First two episodes were broadcast each week during Thursdays and third and final feature length episode was broadcast on Tuesday.

== Cast ==
- Tony Doyle as Harry Clancy
- Tom Bell as Frank Yallop
- Neil Dudgeon as Vince Yallop
- Stuart McQuarrie as Spud Starkie
- Ruth Gemmell as Nicola Yallop
- Eva Pope as Kathy Starkie
- Jacquetta May as Linda Clancy
- Kate Lonergan as Dawn Starkie
- Emma Williams as Justine Clancy
- Lorraine Pilkington as Christy Bannan
- Peter Ryalls as Colin Yallop
- Amy Dempsey as Danielle Yallop
- Barbara Young as Janice Yallop
- Andrew Tiernan as Johnny Starkie

== Episodes ==
No.	Title	Directed by	Written by	British air date	UK viewers (million)
1	"Episode 1"	Dermot Boyd	Bill Gallagher	9 December 1999	6.88
Father-to-be Spud Starkie struggles to keep his nephew on the rails, while Harry Clancy is knocked for six by the arrival of a face from the past, and tensions mount in the household of divorced couple Vince and Nicola Yallop.
2	"Episode 2"	Dermot Boyd	Bill Gallagher	16 December 1999	6.31
Dawn is devastated by the revelation that Spud is the father of Kathy's unborn child.
3	"Episode 3"	Dermot Boyd	Bill Gallagher	21 December 1999	6.33
Spud is furious when he discovers the identity of Kathy's unborn child; as Harry's daughters meet for the first time, he makes a shocking discovery.

== Reception ==
=== Accolades ===
Tony Doyle was won for Best Drama Actor and Phelps for Best Actor at the 2000 Broadcasting Press Guild Awards sharing with BBC TV series Ballykissangel.
