= Michael Elwyn =

Welsh actor (born 1942)

- Born: Michael Bremner Emyrs Jones; 23 August 1942 (age 83); Pontypridd, Glamorgan, Wales, UK
- Occupation: Actor
- Years active: 1964–present
- Spouse: Naomi Buch (m. 1988; divorced/died 1996)
- Partner: Alison Steadman
- Elwyn's voice recorded 2012, as part of an audio description of St Martin-in-the-Fields for VocalEyes

Michael Elwyn (born 23 August 1942) is a Welsh actor, notable for his work in film (Shadow Man), stage (The Audience, as Anthony Eden) and television (Stella).

== Early life ==
The son of an Anglican clergyman, Elwyn moved with his family from Wales to Stratford when he was five years old. Initially, he planned to become a barrister and follow in the family's footsteps of having a career in law since his mother and grandfather were magistrates. However, an interest in acting caused him to change his career path.

Elwyn started acting at the age of 10 when he was at Preparatory School but did not take it up seriously until attending Marlborough Public School from 1956 to 1961. There, he received encouragement from the drama teacher and played the lead in a production of George Bernard Shaw's play Saint Joan. Winning a place at Oxford University at age 18, Elwyn studied English but spent most of his time acting and took part in 16 university productions, touring to places such as France, Israel and Ireland, as well as performing in the West End. Aged 21, he sat his final examinations but did not get his degree.

== Career ==
Dropping his academic work for a professional acting career, Elwyn started his way up by appearing in repertory. Due to there already being an actor named Emrys Jones, he had to change his surname to Elwyn for acting purposes.

Television work includes regular roles as Richard Duncan in seven episodes of Doomwatch, Lt. Henry Percival in seven episodes of The Regiment, the Hon. Greville Carnforth in The Carnforth Practice, Roger Powell in 20 episodes of Triangle, Timmy Gould in seven episodes of The Brief, CDI Simpson in Sam Saturday, Rev. Henry Mills in two series of Bad Girls and Sir Edward in the BBC series of Robin Hood. In 2020, Elwyn joined the cast of Coronation Street playing Charles Moore, Resident Chair of 'Stillwaters'.

== Personal life ==
It was while appearing in BBC wartime drama No Bananas that Elwyn began a relationship with his onscreen wife Alison Steadman. They subsequently left their own spouses (actress Naomi Buch and director Mike Leigh; the former died shortly afterwards in 1996 while the latter's divorce didn't come through until 2001) and moved in together. The couple live in Highgate, London.

== Filmography ==
=== TV ===
Year	Title	Role	Production	Notes
1966–1967	Doctor Who	Lt. Algernon Ffinch	BBC Television	Serial: The Highlanders
1971	Jude the Obscure	Undergraduate	BBC Television	
1980	Love in a Cold Climate	Roly	Thames Television	
1988	Piece of Cake	Air Commodore Bletchley	LWT	
1996	This Life	Montgomery Stewart	BBC Two / World Productions	
2002–2003	Bad Girls	Rev. Henry Mills	Shed Productions	
2004	Rosemary and Thyme	Tim Monkton	ITV	Episode: Up the Garden Path
2006–2007	Robin Hood	Edward, Marian's father		Season 1–2
2012, 2017	Stella	Ken, Stella's father	Sky One	Series regular; 13 episodes
2013	Da Vinci's Demons	Gentile Becchi		
2020	Coronation Street	Charles Moore	ITV	Recurring role; 13 episodes
2020	Casualty	Eric Mann	BBC Television	1 episode
2020	Quiz	Judge Rivlin	ITV	Episode #1.3
2021	Foundation	Pilgrim Eskel	Apple TV+	1 episode
2022–2024	House of the Dragon	Lord Simon Staunton	HBO	5 episodes
2025	Out There	Owen Thomas		

=== Film ===
Year	Title	Role	Production	Notes
2006	Shadow Man	George		

=== Stage ===
Year	Title	Role	Production	Notes
2013	The Audience			
