= The Music Game =

British game show (1992–93)

- Genre: Game show
- Directed by: Mike Mansfield
- Presented by: Tony Slattery
- Starring: Richard Vranch; Jonathan Cohen (some Series 1 episodes only)
- Country of origin: United Kingdom
- Original language: English
- No. of series: 2
- No. of episodes: 19 (inc. 1 special)

Production
- Executive producer: Dan Maddicott
- Producer: Mike Mansfield
- Production locations: HTV Television Centre, Bristol, England, UK
- Running time: 28 minutes
- Production company: HTV West in association with Mike Mansfield Television

Original release
- Network: Channel 4
- Release: 8 May 1992 – 23 December 1993

The Music Game is a British television panel game show was produced by HTV West in association with Mike Mansfield Television for Channel 4 and that originally aired between 8 May 1992 and 23 December 1993, it is hosted by Tony Slattery and co-hosted by alumnus Richard Vranch as a keyboardist for most of episodes, sometimes co-hosted by Jonathan Cohen as a keyboardist for some series 1 episodes.

== Format ==
The teams are made up of three pop stars with one acting as team captain, although no permanent team captains. Guests who have appeared as captains include Cathy Thompson, Helen Lederer, Christopher Warren-Green, Tony Hawks, Steve Wright, Michael Ball, Rosemary Ashe, Alan Coren, Reg Presley, Kate Copstick, Dave Fanning, Betty Boo, Barrington Pheloung, Neil Innes, Andy Taylor, Sandie Shaw, David Mellor and Charles Kennedy. Occasionally, non-musical guests such as Nichola McAuliffe, Michelle Collins, Linda Agran, Tony Blackburn, Nicholas Parsons, or the triple act of The Beverley Sisters also appeared as guests.

=== Rounds ===
Similar format to that of the Pop Quiz, the show has both team and individual rounds. The individual rounds see each player given a song then asked a question about the song (like a guest player on the recording), asked to identify three different artists who sang the same song in the correct order, or asked to name a song where a certain lyric appears. Team rounds include a naming a list of number one hits by a group, a compilation of songs of a particular theme where the teams guess the artist. Each episode ended with a quick-fire round of music trivia questions.

== Transmissions ==
Series	Start date	End date	Episodes
1	8 May 1992	10 July 1992	10
2	16 September 1993	11 November 1993	9
Special	23 December 1993		1
