= Terry and Julian =

- Starring: Julian Clary; Lee Simpson; Kate Lonergan
- Country of origin: United Kingdom
- Original language: English
- No. of series: 1
- No. of episodes: 6

Production
- Running time: 30 minutes

Original release
- Network: Channel 4
- Release: 11 September – 16 October 1992

Terry and Julian is a British sitcom that aired on Channel 4 in 1992. Starring Julian Clary, it was written by Clary, Paul Merton and John Henderson. The title of the series spoofs the name of the long-running BBC sitcom Terry and June, whose stars June Whitfield and Reginald Marsh made a guest appearance in episode five, "Terry's Safe Deposit", playing characters named George and Mildred (in homage to the Thames Television sitcom George and Mildred).

== Cast ==
- Julian Clary – Julian
- Lee Simpson – Terry Biggins
- Kate Lonergan – Rene

Guest stars

- Paul Merton - Vicar
- June Whitfield - Mildred Wilson
- Reginald Marsh - George Wilson
- Gordon Honeycombe - News Reader

== Plot ==
Terry Biggins, an average, heterosexual man, advertises for a lodger for his flat in Streatham and Julian, a flamboyant gay Channel 4 celebrity moves in. Julian soon disrupts Terry's mundane life, turns the flat into something similar to an 18th-century Turkish boudoir and disrupts Terry's relationship with his girlfriend, policewoman Rene.

Unusually for a sitcom, Terry and Julian breaks the "fourth wall" by recognising the studio audience and viewers, and employs use of audience participation.

== Episodes ==
1. "Enter Julian" (11 September 1992)
2. "Get Thee Behind Me" (18 September 1992)
3. "Julian Slips Out" (25 September 1992)
4. "The Other Side of Julian" (2 October 1992)
5. "Julian's Safe Deposit" (9 October 1992)
6. "Spain" (16 October 1992)
