= Bits from Last Week's Radio =

British radio programme, 1995-1996

- Genre: Radio drama Comedy radio
- Country of origin: United Kingdom
- Language: English
- Home station: BBC Radio 1
- Hosted by: Greg Proops
- Starring: Keith Wickham; Adrienne Posta; Neil Mullarkey; Jo Caulfield
- Written by: Eardrum Productions
- Produced by: Eardrum Productions
- Recording studio: The Sound Company, London
- Original release: 1995 – 1996

Bits from Last Week's Radio is a radio programme that aired on BBC Radio 1 from 1995–1996, starring Greg Proops. It was written and produced by Eardrum Productions on behalf of Unique Broadcasting, and recorded at The Sound Company in London by Joss Sanglier.

== Overview ==
The show featured a mixture of music and comedy sketches linked by Greg Proops. Sketches parodied old radio shows. The show consisted of two teams, split into "The Americans" and "The British", and were recorded separately. Sketches covered subjects such as Hospital Radio, the supposed original recording of the Hindenburg Disaster, the shooting of JFK, phone-in programmes, religious programmes, news programmes, among others. Although the sketches were heavily produced to be as realistic as possible, at the end of the mixing process they were then degraded to make them sound like they were found in an old archive.

Cast members included Keith Wickham, Adrienne Posta, Neil Mullarkey and Jo Caulfield.

== Technical production notes ==
The programme was produced in three stages:

=== Cast recordings ===
The sketches were recorded dry in a radio studio at the Sound Company in London. Recordings were made with the Fostex 2000 Digital Audio Workstation. Sketches were recorded to fake the supposed original conditions. For a Studio Radio Programme, the actors were seated, and typical radio microphones were used. Where the sketch was a lone reporter recording a field report, the entire sketch was recorded on a single microphone being held by the actor. Vintage sketches used vintage microphones. The actors were encouraged to act out the sketch physically as well as vocally to give the best sense of movement.

=== Sketch mixing ===
The mixing took place in a separate session, though in the same studio. Library effects were used for the atmospheres, but many spot effects were produced Foley style in the studio by Martin Simms and Joss Sanglier. This often entailed the two throwing themselves at cardboard boxes or beating up items of clothing. The audio was restricted to mimic the supposed reality of the sketch. As with the voice recordings, if the sketch was a lone reporter with a microphone, then all foley recordings were recorded on the same single microphone.

Once the sketches were finished and mastered, they were then degraded to more closely resemble a radio item recorded off air by a listener. This entailed frequency limiting and copying via analogue reel-to-reel tape to add tape noise and the occasional audio error.

=== Final production ===
The final shows were recorded "as live" at Unique Broadcasting, where they were presented by Greg Proops, and the sketches and the records were played into the show.
