= Eva Pope =

English actress (born 1967)

- Born: 16 November 1967 (age 59); Appley Bridge, Wigan, Lancashire, England
- Occupation: Actress
- Years active: 1990–present
- Spouse: Laurence Lassalle (m. 1994; div. 2004)
- Children: 1
- Website: Official website

Eva Rebecca Pope (born 16 November 1967) is an English actress, best known for her portrayal of longest-serving headmistress Rachel Mason in Waterloo Road, and appearances in Coronation Street, Dream Team, Bad Girls and Hetty Feather.

== Early life and education ==
Eva Pope was born in Appley Bridge, Wigan, Lancashire on 16 November 1967. She trained to be an actress at the Webber Douglas Academy of Dramatic Art, graduating in 1988.

== Career ==
Pope's first major role was playing the villainous Tanya Pooley in the ITV soap opera Coronation Street from 1993 to 1994. Since then, she has made appearances in Cold Feet, The Bill, Heartbeat, Peak Practice (as Claire Brightwell), Men of the World, Four Fathers, Holby City, Casualty, Strictly Confidential, Adventure Inc., Vincent (as Cathy Gallagher), Bad Girls as G-Wing Governor, Frances Myers, Life on Mars, Sorted, Spooks: Code 9 and the film Shadow Man. From November 2007 to July 2010, she appeared as headteacher Rachel Mason in the BBC One school-based drama series Waterloo Road.

Pope's theatre credits include roles in The Comedy of Errors, Turkey Time and Hobson's Choice. She is a regular performer and was part of the original cast of Seven Deadly Sins Four Deadly Sinners and in November 2007, appeared at the Théâtre Princesse Grace, Monte Carlo, directed by Marc Sinden, as part of his British Theatre Season, Monaco.

In March 2011, Pope starred as Ellie in the BBC One daytime drama 32 Brinkburn Street. She starred in Being Sold the Movie, which premiered on 19 June 2011. On 13 August 2011, Eva Pope starred as policewoman Simone Grayson on Casualty in the first episode of series 26. She appeared in the third series of Moving On on 16 November 2011 playing Michelle. In 2017, she appeared in Season 20 Episodes 5 and 6 of the BBC forensic drama series Silent Witness as DI Heather Ashton. From 2015 to 2020, she played Matron Gertrude Bottomly in CBBC's adaptation of Hetty Feather, based on the book of the same name by Jacqueline Wilson.

In 2019, Pope appeared in Deep Cuts as Bridget McFadden.

Pope is also a noted voice-over artist whose credits include Raymond Blanc's Kitchen Secrets and a number of audiobooks.

== Personal life ==
In 1994, Pope was married to graphic designer Laurence Lassalle, with whom she has a daughter. They divorced in 2004. Pope is a grandmother. She is a vegan.

== Filmography ==
=== Film ===
Year	Title	Role	Notes
1998	Holiday Romance	Victoria	Short film
2001	Denial	Doctor	Short film
2006	Shadow Man	Anya	
2006	Splinter	Dr. Lexington	
2007	Natasha	Elaine	
2008	Searching	Lillian	
2011	Being Sold	Lara Foster	
2011	Gee Gee	Susan	Short film
2015	Route Canal	Caroline	Short film
2016	The Interrogation of Olivia Donovan	Sarah Hardy	Short film
2022	Camaleonte	Arabella	Short film
2023	The Venice Murders	Aunt Rosa	Film known in the UK as “A Murder In Venice”

=== Television ===
Year	Title	Role	Notes
1993–1994	Coronation Street	Tanya Pooley	Regular role; 142 episodes
1995	Men of the World	Becky	5 episodes
1996	Ellington	Lara	Episode: "Matchmaker"
1996	Under the Skin	Lisa	Television film
1996	Casualty	Josie Barker	Episode: "Do You Believe in Fairies?"
1997	Heartbeat	Sharma	Episode: "Peace and Quiet"
1997	Peak Practice	Sally Gillespie	Episode: "Lost Feelings"
1997–1998	Dream Team	Stephanie Jacobs	Regular role; 64 episodes
1998	Grafters	Janice	2 episodes
1998	Cold Feet	Trixie	Series 1: Episode 3
1998	McCallum	Dr. Charley Fielding	Episode: "Beyond Good and Evil"
1999	Four Fathers	Kathy Starkie	TV mini-series; all 3 episodes
2000	Peak Practice	Karen	Episode: "And Then There Were Two"
2000	The Bill	Geraldine/Linda	Episode: "Scoop"
2000	My Fragile Heart	Ruby Mason	Television film
2001–2002	Peak Practice	Claire Brightwell	Main role; 13 episodes
2002	Nice Guy Eddie	Susannah King	Series 1: Episode 3
2003	Adventure Inc.	Fiona Gray	Episode: "Legacy of a Pirate"
2003	The Eustace Bros.	Catherine	Series 1: Episode 2
2003	Holby City	Caroline Dewer	Episodes: "Love Nor Money" and "Just Getting By"
2004	Bad Girls	Frances Myers	Main role; Series 6 (12 episodes)
2005	Vincent	Cathy Gallagher	2 episodes
2006	Dalziel and Pascoe	Jane Caulfield	Episodes: "Guardian Angel: Parts 1 & 2"
2006	Sorted	Kathy	All 6 episodes
2006	Strictly Confidential	DS Angie Morton	All 6 episodes
2007	Life on Mars	Carol Twilling	Series 2: Episode 4
2007–2010	Waterloo Road	Rachel Mason	Regular role; 52 episodes
2008	Spooks: Code 9	Hamilton	Series 1: Episode 5
2010–2011	Raymond Blanc's Kitchen Secrets	Narrator	Television series
2011	32 Brinkburn Street	Ellie	TV mini-series; all 5 episodes
2011	Casualty	Simone Grayson	Episode: "Partners"
2011	Law & Order: UK	Renay Everett	Episode: "Line Up"
2011	Moving On	Michelle	Episode: "Punter"
2013	Holby City	Laura Edison	3 episodes
2015	New Tricks	Clara Bishop	Episode: "The Fame Game"
2015–2020	Hetty Feather	Matron Bottomly	Regular role; 33 episodes
2016	The Dumping Ground	Matron Bottomly	Episode: "Floss the Foundling"
2017	Silent Witness	DI Heather Ashton	Episodes: "Remembrance: Parts 1 & 2"
2019	Deep Cuts	Bridget McFadden	TV mini-series; all 3 episodes
2022	Somewhere Boy	Angie	Series 1 episode 2
2023	Maternal	Sally Thomason	Series 1 episode 2
2023	A Murder in Venice	Aunt Rosa	TV Movie
