= CBTV =

1982 British TV programme

- Also known as: CBTV: Channel 14
- Genre: Children's magazine
- Presented by: Jim Sweeney; Steve Steen
- Country of origin: United Kingdom
- Original language: English
- No. of series: 4
- No. of episodes: 136

Production
- Production company: Thames Television

Original release
- Network: ITV
- Release: 5 January 1982 – 9 April 1985

Related
- Ace Reports

CBTV (initially titled CBTV: Channel 14) is a Thames Television magazine programme for younger viewers, broadcast over four series in the 1980s.

Its main presenters were the comedy duo Jim Sweeney & Steve Steen, who at the start of each show would have to sneak past the security guard (played by Harry Fielder) on the gates of Teddington Studios to get to their rooftop studio. Other presenters on the show included Anneka Rice, Paul Henley and Mike Smith.

== Transmission guide ==
- Series 1: 26 editions from 5 January 1982 – 13 July 1982
- Series 2: 43 editions from 28 September 1982 – 26 July 1983
- Series 3: 44 editions from 6 September 1983 – 10 July 1984
- Series 4: 24 editions from 16 October 1984 – 9 April 1985
