= Mark Michael Hutchinson =

English actor (born 1959)

Mark Michael Hutchinson (born 1959) is an English actor who won the 1993 Drama Desk Award for Outstanding Featured Actor in a Musical for his performance as Eddie in Blood Brothers.

His partner was the British comedian and actor Tony Slattery, who died in 2025. They met while performing in the musical Me and My Girl in the West End in 1986.
