= Kate Lonergan =

English actress

- Born: Helen Catherine Lonergan; 4 January 1962 (age 64); Barton upon Irwell, Lancashire, England
- Occupations: Actress; businesswoman

Helen Catherine "Kate" Lonergan (born 4 January 1962) is an English garden designer and former actress, best known for playing the role of Maid Marian in the BBC1 children's television series Maid Marian and Her Merry Men (1989–1994).

== Career ==
Prior to being cast as Marian, Lonergan had appeared in the screenplay Testimony of a Child and The Tall Guy. She has since appeared in numerous episodes of TV series, including the mini-series Terry and Julian (1992) and Four Fathers (1999), as well as The Bill, Hetty Wainthropp Investigates, The Hello Girls, Born and Bred, Doctors, Is It Legal?, and Blue Heaven.

After retiring from acting, Lonergan co-founded The Blackheath Windowbox Company, a "bespoke containerised gardening company" in March 2011, which was dissolved in 2016.
