= Niall Ashdown =

English comedian, actor, improvisor and writer

Niall Ashdown is an English comedian, actor, improvisor and writer.

He has previously improvised in such television shows as Lifegame, Animo, Improbable Tales at the Nottingham Playhouse, Impropera and with the Comedy Store Players. He has written and performed two acclaimed solo shows, Hungarian Bird Festival and The Man Who Would Be Sting and is in Note to Tale, a work with the improvising classical quintet Between the Notes. He is also part of Impropera - a group who improvise operas based on suggestions from the audience - they are currently developing a show for a younger audience. Ashdown was the creator of the 'Robbo' Robson character who blogged on the BBC Sport website for nine years, finishing in 2010, although the Robbo blog is still alive and well, along with the odd podcast.

Ashdown has also appeared in Chambers, Swiss Toni, Outnumbered as Steve and, as writer/performer, Barking and Confessions.

Ashdown was in the original British version of Whose Line is it Anyway?, appearing in series 7, episodes 1 and 11, and episodes 5, 9 and 13 of series 8.

His radio work includes that he has co-written and was included in two series of Losers for BBC Radio 4 and in the radio play, Tunnel Vision, and has previously written poetry for Radio 3's The Verb. He is also Wilf and Ruby's Dad. He is also the voice of Match of the Day's Thunderbird puppet Alan Hansen.

Ashdown played Henry Purcell in Clare Norburn's Burying The Dead at the Brighton Early Music Festival. He starred in Kneehigh Theatre's production of Ubu! A Singalong Satire, inspired by Ubu Roi.
