= Tony Slattery =

English actor and comedian (1959–2025)

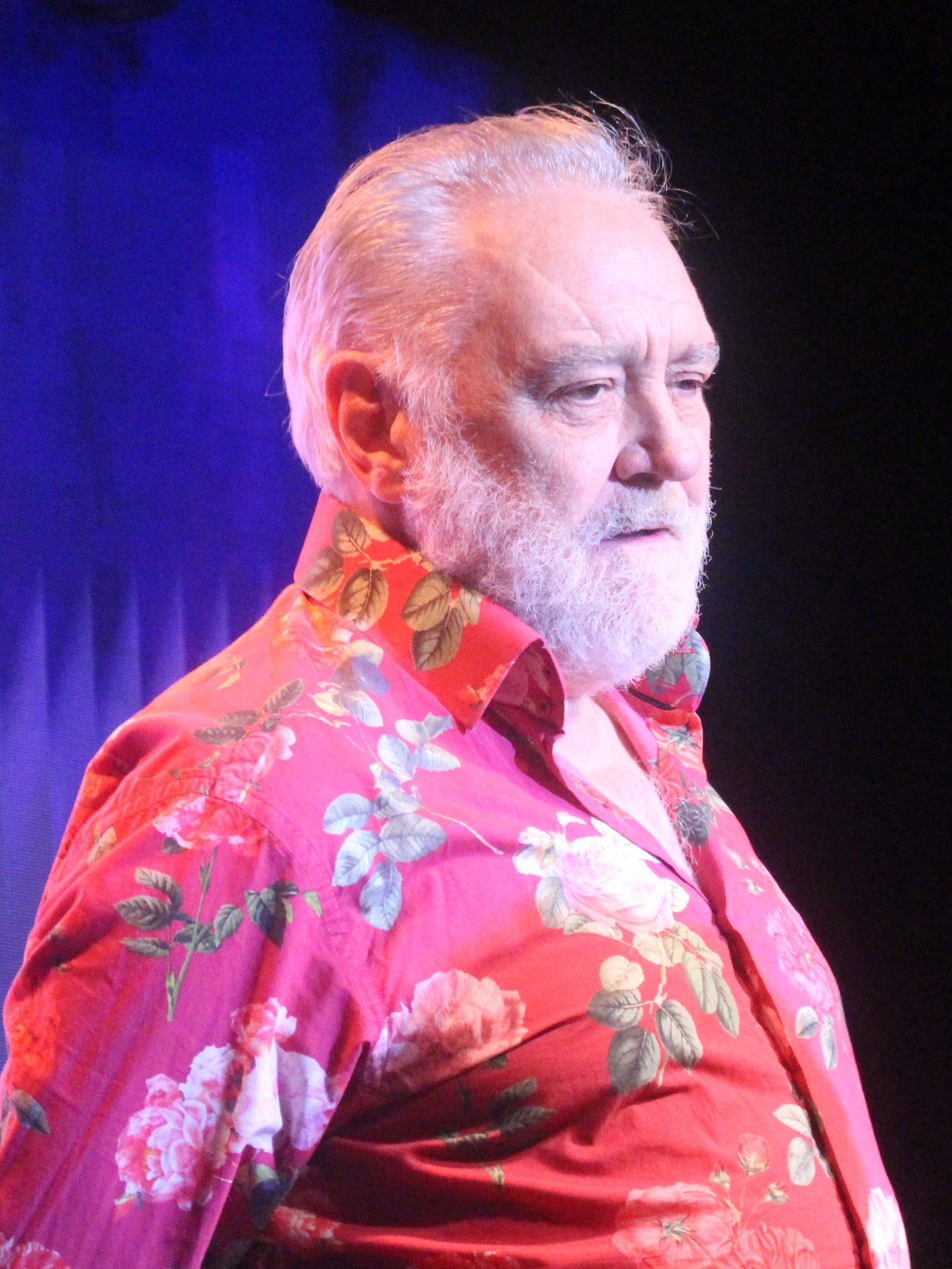
- Slattery in 2024
- Born: Tony Declan James Slattery; 9 November 1959; Stonebridge, London, England
- Died: 14 January 2025 (aged 65)
- Education: Trinity Hall, Cambridge (BA)
- Occupations: Actor; comedian
- Years active: 1982–2025
- Partner: Mark Michael Hutchinson (1986–2025)

Tony Declan James Slattery (9 November 1959 – 14 January 2025) was an English actor and comedian. He appeared on British television regularly from the mid-1980s, including as a regular on the Channel 4 improvisation show Whose Line Is It Anyway?. His serious and comedic film work included roles in The Crying Game, Peter's Friends and How to Get Ahead in Advertising.

== Early life and education ==
Slattery was born, on 9 November 1959, in Stonebridge, London, into a working-class background, the fifth and last child of Catholic Irish immigrants, Michael and Margaret Slattery.

In April 2019 Slattery revealed that he had been repeatedly sexually abused by a priest at the age of eight, but had never told his parents; he believed the event contributed to his unstable character later in life. He was educated at Gunnersbury Boys' School in west London and won a scholarship to read Modern and Medieval Languages at Trinity Hall, Cambridge, specialising in French literature and Spanish poetry. Slattery held a black belt in judo and represented England internationally for under-15s.

At the University of Cambridge, Slattery discovered a love of the theatre, taking delight in making people laugh. He met Stephen Fry, who invited him to join the Cambridge Footlights. Other members at that time included Hugh Laurie, Emma Thompson, Sandi Toksvig, Jan Ravens and Richard Vranch.

In 1981 Slattery, Fry, Laurie, Thompson and Toksvig won the inaugural Perrier Award for their revue The Cellar Tapes. The following year, Slattery was made President of the Footlights. During his tenure, the touring annual revue was Premises, Premises.

== Television and film ==
=== Breakthrough and peak ===
Slattery first broke into television as a regular performer on Chris Tarrant's follow up to O.T.T., Saturday Stayback (1983), while also appearing for children in Behind the Bike Sheds and the Saturday-morning show TX. In 1988 he appeared in the first series of comedy improvisation show Whose Line Is It Anyway? and quickly became a regular performer on the show. In 1991 he and fellow Whose Line regular Mike McShane starred in their own improvisational comedy series, S&M. During the 1990s he was also a regular guest on the comedy panel show Have I Got News for You.

As a dramatic actor he appeared in The Crying Game, To Die For, Peter's Friends, Up 'n' Under and The Wedding Tackle (1999) as Little Ted.

At the end of the 1980s he became a film critic, presenting his own show on British television, Saturday Night at the Movies. He also appeared in the ITV sitcom That's Love with Jimmy Mulville.

Slattery was also a regular guest with the Comedy Store Players, both at The Comedy Store in London and on tour.

In 1992 Slattery appeared in the film Carry On Columbus. In the same year he appeared in the series Dead Ringer, filmed for the observation round in The Krypton Factor. In 1993 he starred in the ITV sitcom Just a Gigolo. From 1993 to 1994 he was the host of the game show Trivial Pursuit.

In 1994 Slattery auditioned for the role of the Eighth Doctor in the Doctor Who television film. He was featured in all episodes of the televised version of the long-running radio gameshow Just a Minute in 1994, and became a team captain when the format was revised in 1995, again appearing in all episodes. He starred in a pilot episode of gentlemen detective spoof Tiger Bastable for ITV in 1995 which was not picked up as a series.

=== Later appearances ===
Personal problems later overshadowed Slattery's career, leading to a reduced profile. He made his last appearance on Whose Line Is It Anyway? in 1995, and due to an extended period of illness, he undertook only occasional television work from the mid-1990s to the early 2000s. He reappeared in Red Dwarf in 1999 as the voice of a vending machine.

In 2005 Slattery appeared in the TV film Ahead of the Class with Julie Walters, portrayed D.I. Alan Hayes in series 7 of Bad Girls, and made a cameo appearance in ITV's Life Begins. He won a celebrity edition of the game show The Weakest Link, defeating Vanessa Feltz in the final round. At the end of the show, he announced that he would donate his prize money to the Terrence Higgins Trust. In December 2005, he joined the soap opera Coronation Street as Eric Talford.

In 2007 Slattery played Tom O'Driscoll in the feature film Lady Godiva: Back in the Saddle, and the Canon of Birkley in the Robin Hood episode "Show Me the Money". From 2007 to 2009, Slattery was a regular cast member in the ITV series Kingdom.

In March 2011, Slattery appeared in a reunion special of Whose Line Is It Anyway? along with David Walliams, Josie Lawrence, Clive Anderson, Humphrey Ker and Neil Mullarkey for the BBC Comic Relief show 24-Hour Panel People.

=== Documentary about his life ===
In April 2019, an interview with Slattery was published in The Guardian, which led to his participation in a television documentary.

In 2020 Slattery and his partner Mark Hutchinson were featured in an edition of the BBC Horizon series entitled "What's the Matter with Tony Slattery?" In a detailed examination of his mental health, childhood trauma and substance addictions, medical professionals concluded that Slattery continued to experience the effects of trauma relating to childhood sexual abuse; was on the bipolar spectrum; and suffered alcohol dependence. The professionals advised Slattery on steps to take to improve his mental health and his physical wellbeing.

== Theatre and comedy ==
In 1981 he teamed with Richard Vranch as a comedic duo calling themselves "Aftertaste". For a number of years they toured throughout Great Britain performing in small venues: theatres and clubs, including the Tunnel Club, King's Head Theatre in London and aboard the Thekla ship in Bristol. Together they hosted the Channel 4 quiz The Music Game (1992–93) and some episodes of the ITV series Cue the Music.

Featuring his baritone voice, Slattery appeared on London's West End stages in the musicals Me and My Girl and Radio Times, as well as in the play Neville's Island at Nottingham Playhouse in 1994.

In May 1998 he was elected as Rector of the University of Dundee, his first job in two years. In 2000, his poor attendance record (a single visit in a one-year period) led to calls for his resignation from some students. The official view was that it would not be worthwhile ousting him, because his term was to end in February 2001.

In May 2006 he was a narrator in Richard O'Brien's Rocky Horror Tribute Show, at the Royal Court Theatre as part of the 50th-anniversary celebrations.

In 2017–2018 he was the eponymous star of Slattery Night Fever, an improvised comedy show on London's off-West End, directed by Lesley Ann Abiston.

In 2017, Slattery returned to Edinburgh and appeared at the Fringe, as a guest joining other performers. In 2018 Slattery was performing his own again at the Fringe and appeared in shows with the title Slattery will get you Nowhere. He launched a fundraising appeal in May 2019, in support of his continuing to appear on stage.

Starting in 2024, Slattery appeared on a weekly improvised podcast, Tony Slattery's Rambling Club. Special guests included Robin Ince, Richard Vranch and Julian Clary.

== Personal life and death ==
In the mid-1990s, after leaving Whose Line Is It Anyway?, Slattery suffered what he described as a "midlife crisis", triggered by cocaine use and excessive drinking. Slattery said he did not remember how much he had spent on cocaine but "would not be surprised" if media reports that he spent £4,000 per week on the drug were accurate.

In 1996, Slattery's crisis culminated with a six-month period as a recluse, during which he did not answer his door or telephone, "or open bills, or wash... I just sat." Eventually, one of his friends broke down the door of his flat and persuaded him to go to hospital. He was diagnosed with bipolar disorder. He discussed this period and his subsequent living with the disorder in the documentary Stephen Fry: The Secret Life of the Manic Depressive, in 2006; Slattery said that he spent time living in a warehouse and "throwing [his] furniture into the River Thames."

He said: "I'm happily described as gay", and was in a relationship with the actor Mark Michael Hutchinson from 1986 until his death.

In September 2020, Slattery signed a publishing deal to write his memoirs, but the autobiography did not materialise.

Slattery died aged 65, on 14 January 2025, having suffered a heart attack two days previously. His friend Stephen Fry led a tribute on BBC Radio 4's obituary series Last Word. A fundraising campaign, to cover the costs of his funeral, exceeded its £8,000 target.

Academic offices
Preceded by Stephen Fry	Rector of the University of Dundee; 1998–2001	Succeeded by Fred MacAulay
