= Whose Line Is It Anyway? (radio series) =

1988 British radio show

- Genre: Improvisational comedy
- Running time: 30 minutes
- Country of origin: United Kingdom
- Language: English
- Home station: BBC Radio 4
- TV adaptations: Whose Line Is It Anyway? (British TV series)
- Hosted by: Clive Anderson
- Starring: John Sessions; Stephen Fry
- Created by: Dan Patterson; Mark Leveson
- Original release: 2 January – 6 February 1988
- No. of series: 1
- No. of episodes: 6

Whose Line Is It Anyway? (abbreviated to Whose Line? or WLIIA) is a short-form improvisational comedy radio programme, which ran for six episodes on BBC Radio 4 in 1988. A television version of the show began on Channel 4 later that year, which ran for ten years. Following the conclusion of the British television show in 1998, ABC began airing an American television version, which lasted until 2007 before returning on The CW in 2013.

The show consisted of a panel of four performers who create characters, scenes and songs on the spot, in the style of short-form improvisation games, many taken from theatresports. Topics for the games were based on predetermined prompts from the host.

== Episodes ==
Each of the six episodes was hosted by Clive Anderson and featured John Sessions and Stephen Fry as two of the four performers.

No.	Date	Guest performers		Games
1	2 January 1988	Dawn French	Lenny Henry	Authors, Wrong Theme Tune, Every Other Line, Favourite Characters, Improvising a Rap, Change of Company, Worst People
2	9 January 1988	Hugh Laurie	Enn Reitel	Authors, Genre Option, Wrong Theme Tune, Every Other Line, Party Pieces, Improvising a Rap, Worst People
3	16 January 1988	Nonny Williams	Jimmy Mulville	Authors, Genre Option, Wrong Theme Tune, Every Other Line, Improvising a Rap, Interviews, Worst People
4	23 January 1988	Kate Robbins	Griff Rhys Jones	Authors, Genre Option, Improvising a Rap, Party Pieces, Great Debate, Bad Applicants
5	30 January 1988	Jimmy Mulville	John Bird	Authors, Genre Option, Every Other Line, Advertisements, Great Debate, Commiserations
6	6 February 1988	Jon Glover	Rory Bremner	Authors, Genre Option, Advertisements, Couples, Great Debate, Improvising a Rap, Bad Chat-Up Lines
