= Idan Alterman =

Israeli actor

- עידן אלתרמן
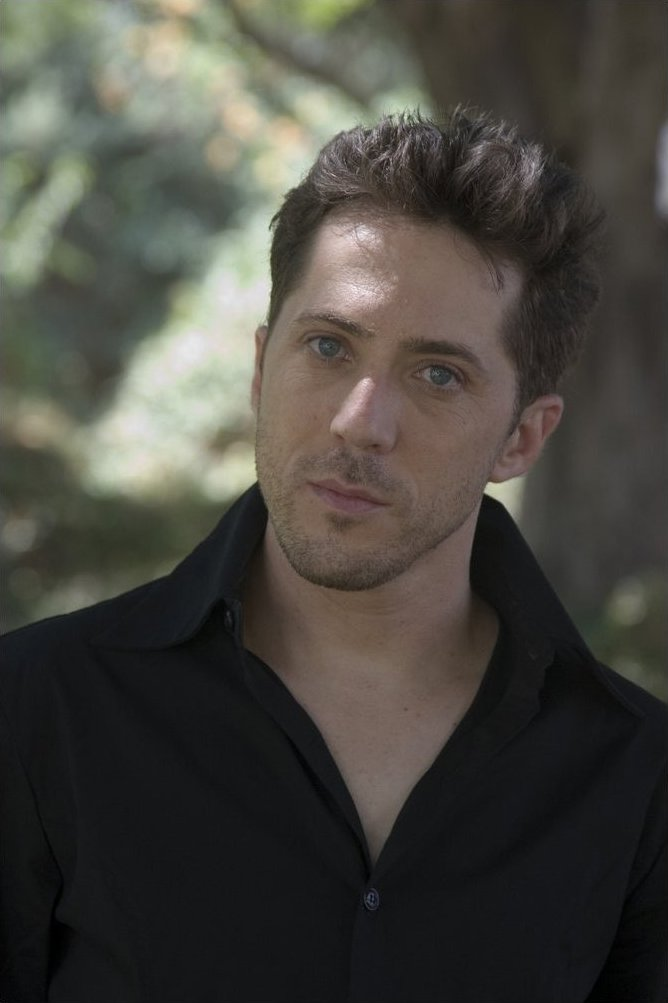
- Born: October 3, 1971 (age 54); Haifa, Israel
- Occupation: Actor

Edan Alterman (Hebrew: עידן אלתרמן) is an Israeli television, film and theater actor.

== Biography ==
In 2011, Idan Alterman played and sang one of the major roles in Habima National Theatre musical Natati La Khayay (I Gave Her My Life) based on the songs of Danny Sanderson, co-founder of the iconic Israeli rock band Kaveret. Edan played the role of Yoram Zuckerman in the play.

Edan Alterman is currently developing a musical career most notably as a guest artist, alongside many other artists in the Magical Mystery Tour Band covering Beatles songs. He also has his own music-and-humour show called "Alt-Shift" where he sings famous songs he translates from English to Hebrew (and one hilarious reverse translation sung Leonard Cohen style).
