= The Masterson Inheritance =

- Cassette cover from the BBC Canned Laughter series, 1993
- Genre: Comedy
- Running time: 30 minutes
- Country of origin: United Kingdom
- Language: English
- Home station: BBC Radio 4
- Starring: Josie Lawrence; Paul Merton; Phelim McDermott; Caroline Quentin; Lee Simpson; Jim Sweeney
- Original release: 22 April 1993 – 25 December 1995
- No. of series: 3
- No. of episodes: 20
- Audio format: Stereophonic sound

The Masterson Inheritance is an improvised comedy series broadcast on BBC Radio 4 from 1993 to 1995 billed as "an improvised historical saga of a family at war with itself." There were three series and two Christmas specials. It was broadcast from 1993 to 1995. From time to time, repeats of the show are broadcast on BBC Radio 4 Extra.

In each programme, the cast members – Josie Lawrence, Phelim McDermott, Paul Merton, Caroline Quentin, Lee Simpson, and Jim Sweeney – would be given a particular historical setting, and, incorporating suggestions from the audience, would improvise that episode in the saga of the Masterson family. One episode, The Marooned Mastersons, was never broadcast but is available on Jim Sweeney's website.

== Music ==
Each episode of the saga was introduced by and ended with Erich Korngold's Hollywood-style title music from the 1946 film noir Deception.

== Critical reaction ==
The Independent reckoned the show was genuinely improvised, due to the "air of suppressed panic", even if the improvisation revolved around a small number of choices. It questioned the longevity of the format once people got bored with listening to their mistakes.

== Episode list ==
| Series | Episode | Title | Historical setting | First broadcast |
|---|---|---|---|---|
| 1 | 1 | The Curse of the Mastersons | The 1760s and the slave trade | 22 April 1993 |
| 1 | 2 | The Mastersons and Johnson | The 1790s | 29 April 1993 |
| 1 | 3 | Scurvy | The 1800s at sea | 6 May 1993 |
| 1 | 4 | The Sweat of the Mastersons | Victorian London | 13 May 1993 |
| 1 | 5 | The Tatting of the Mastersons | 19th century America | 20 May 1993 |
| 1 | 6 | The Mastersons Lose Everything | The 1890s | 27 May 1993 |
| Special | 1 | The Stuffing of the Mastersons | Victorian Christmas | 25 December 1993 |
| 2 | 1 | Beware the Ides of Masterson | Imperial Rome | 11 June 1994 |
| 2 | 2 | The Quest for the Other Rabbit's Foot | The court of King Arthur | 18 June 1994 |
| 2 | 3 | Last Word to the Mastersons | The Industrial Revolution | 25 June 1994 |
| 2 | 4 | The Jousting Mastersons | Late 15th century | 2 July 1994 |
| 2 | 5 | The Gangrene of the Mastersons | The Crimean War | 9 July 1994 |
| 2 | 6 | The Mastersons Go Down | The Hercules (passenger ship) | 16 July 1994 |
| 3 | 1 | The Mastersons Magical Marquee (1) | Travelling Victorian circus | 24 June 1995 |
| 3 | 2 | The Mastersons Magical Marquee (2) | Travelling Victorian circus | 1 July 1995 |
| 3 | 3 | Masterson Rides Again | 19th century public school | 8 July 1995 |
| 3 | 4 | The Masterson Bunch | Early 20th century before the great war | 15 July 1995 |
| 3 | 5 | The Pain of the Mastersons | The romantic poets | 22 July 1995 |
| 3 | 6 | The St Valentine's Day Masterson | 1920s Hollywood | 29 July 1995 |
| Special | 2 | The Mastersons' Christmas Cracker | An isolated village of ancient beliefs | 25 December 1995 |
