= Lee Simpson =

British actor and comedian

Lee Simpson is a British actor and comedian best known as a member of the improvisational group The Comedy Store Players.

He has appeared in a number of roles, including in the sitcom Drop the Dead Donkey and the films Paper Mask and Nuns on the Run, and played a key role in co-devising and narrating the improvisational radio show The Masterson Inheritance in the years 1993-1995. He was involved in Paul Merton Live At The London Palladium in 1994, along with fellow Comedy Store Players Paul Merton and Richard Vranch. Before becoming involved in improvisation, he was, among other things, a croupier in a casino, a cinema projectionist, and a breakfast DJ.

He did his first performance with The Comedy Store Players in 1989, and became a member of the group in 1990. In 1992 he appeared as Terry in the channel 4 sitcom Terry and Julian (not associated with Terry and June although the show's name was a spoof title). The programme only lasted one series which had six episodes.

Simpson has appeared on BBC Radio 4 in the improvised comedy series The Masterson Inheritance and the murder panel show Foul Play. On stage, he appeared in a 2017 production of Lost Without Words at the Royal National Theatre.
