= Whose Line Is It Anyway? (British TV series) =

British TV improvisational comedy series

- Genre: Improvisational comedy
- Created by: Dan Patterson; Mark Leveson
- Presented by: Clive Anderson
- Country of origin: United Kingdom
- Original language: English
- No. of series: 10
- No. of episodes: 136 (list of episodes)

Production
- Running time: 30 minutes (inc. adverts); 45 minutes (Christmas special inc. adverts)
- Production company: Hat Trick Productions

Original release
- Network: Channel 4
- Release: 23 September 1988 – 4 February 1999

Related
- Whose Line Is It Anyway? (radio series); Whose Line Is It Anyway? (American TV series)

Whose Line Is It Anyway? (shortened to Whose Line? or WLIIA) is a short-form improvisational comedy television panel show created by Dan Patterson and Mark Leveson, presented by Clive Anderson, and produced for Channel 4 between 23 September 1988 and 4 February 1999. The programme features a panel of four performers (six in the Christmas special) conducting a series of short-form improvisation games, creating comedic scenes per predetermined situations made by Anderson or from suggestions by the audience. Such games include creating sound effects, performing a scene to different television and film styles, using props, and making up a song on the spot. The programme originally began as a short-lived BBC radio programme, before the concept was adapted for television.

During its history, the programme featured a variety of noted comedians from Britain, America and Canada. Notable performers during the show's run included John Sessions, Stephen Fry, Josie Lawrence, Paul Merton, Tony Slattery, Rory Bremner, Archie Hahn, Mike McShane, Sandi Toksvig, Greg Proops, Ryan Stiles, Colin Mochrie, Jim Sweeney, Steve Steen, Stephen Frost, Chip Esten, Brad Sherwood, Caroline Quentin and Wayne Brady. The programme was mainly recorded in Britain, though several episodes of series 3 and 4 were made in New York, while the tenth and final series was shot entirely in California on the same set as the American version.

The success of Whose Line? spawned several domestic and international adaptations. The American version, featuring several of the same performers as the British version, aired on ABC between 1998 and 2007, and was revived on The CW from 2013 to 2024. A short-lived Australian version ran on The Comedy Channel during 2016. Two similarly themed British comedy programmes, Mock the Week (2005–2022, 2026-present) and Fast and Loose (2011), were created by Patterson.

== History ==
A frame from the series 6 to 9 opening sequence for Whose Line Is It Anyway?, inspired by La Linea animation. Series 10 used a variation, with the line characters in neon pink on a Hollywood skyline background.

In 1988, Dan Patterson and Mark Leveson approached the BBC with a concept for a new comedy programme, involving a group of performers conducting games that encompassed improvisational comedy. The title of their concept was a comedic riposte to the radio programme What's My Line, which had recently moved to a television format, merged to the title of a 1972 play, Whose Life Is It Anyway?. Their pitch was well liked by the broadcaster, who green-lighted a radio programme for broadcast on BBC Radio 4, commissioning six episodes. Both Patterson and Leveson opted for it to be presented by Clive Anderson, with John Sessions and Stephen Fry as the regular performers accompanied by two guest stars each episode, while music was provided by Colin Sell.

After the radio series came to an end, Patterson and Leveson began discussions with the BBC on creating a televised adaption of their concept. However, the broadcaster was hesitant on making the move, leading to the pair being approached by Channel 4, who eagerly liked the idea, and securing a deal from the producers to bring the programme to their channel. The move to television was initially hit with a problem, as while it was desired for the regular cast to appear on the first televised series, Fry had begun to dislike conducting improvisational comedy. The matter was resolved by allowing him to pull out, with Sessions convinced by Fry to remain as a permanent performer for the first series (Fry did agree to appear in two episodes of the first series, and would make a surprise return to the show in 1997 for one episode in series 9). In addition, Sell was unable to perform on the programme, resulting in Richard Vranch - a member of improvisational group, The Comedy Store Players, based at London's Comedy Store - becoming the resident musician for much of the programme's broadcast.

Whose Line? proved a success when aired on Channel 4, effectively helping to boost the careers of some of its regular performers that appeared during early episodes, including several members from The Comedy Store Players - these included Paul Merton, Josie Lawrence and Sandi Toksvig - and comedy actor Tony Slattery. At times, the programme also featured a number of celebrities who made occasional appearances during the earlier series, such as Peter Cook, Jonathan Pryce and Griff Rhys Jones. After appearing in every episode of the first series, Sessions reduced his involvement with the show, making his last appearance in series 3. While the programme drew from the talent of British comedians, it also expanded to recruiting those from America, including Greg Proops and Mike McShane, both formerly of San Francisco improv group Faultline. During 1991 and 1992, several episodes of series 3 and 4 were filmed in New York. By series 5, other projects led to several regular performers, including Lawrence and McShane, to appear on the show less frequently, while others, including Merton, made their last appearances in this series. Slattery and Proops continued to appear regularly, as did American comedian Ryan Stiles and Canadian comedian Colin Mochrie. Stiles and Mochrie proved to be very popular with viewers, and the show's ratings continued to improve. Stiles eventually became a permanent performer on the show, appearing in every episode from series 7 onwards, as did Mochrie from series 8 onwards.

As the series progressed, the viewing figures of Whose Line? began to drop after reaching the peak of its popularity in series 6. Part of the problem was due to the constant use of regular performers, leaving little room for new talent to be showcased, one of the main appeals of the programme's early years. The departure of Slattery, one of the show's most popular performers, after series 7 also affected ratings. During this period, the show still occasionally saw one-off celebrity guest performers, including George Wendt and Eddie Izzard. By series 10, filming of the programme moved to Hollywood, California. With the exception of Anderson still as presenter, the show's cast was now entirely North American, with fresh talent found in comedians such as Wayne Brady, while Vranch was replaced by Laura Hall as the in-house musician. However, after the broadcast of its final episode in February 1999, Channel 4 decided to axe the programme following the eventual slump in the show's viewing figures. Repeats of Whose Line? continued following its cancellation, though with episodes edited and reformatted as a result.

== Format ==
Most television episodes of Whose Line Is It Anyway? featured four performers (with the exception of six in the 1989 Christmas special) who sit in a line of chairs at the back of the stage. The host, Clive Anderson, sat at a desk facing the large performance area in front of the performers. Anderson introduced each performer with a joke or pun, usually all related on a common theme or topic.

The show is made up of games that are scored by Anderson, who declared arbitrary point values after the game, often citing a humorous reason for his decision. The points are purely decorative, served no practical purpose, and were often awarded to the audience or other arbitrary third persons. The styles of the games are varied (see Games, below). Some feature all four performers, while others feature fewer. The performers who are not involved in a game remain in their seats at the back of the stage. Humorous banter between Anderson and the performers between games is also sometimes included, with Anderson and Greg Proops play-arguing with each other becoming a regular feature over time.

At the conclusion of each episode, a winner or several winners are chosen arbitrarily by Anderson. The "prize" for winning the show is to read out the closing credits in a certain style, chosen by Anderson, as they scrolled on screen.

Episodes were culled down from longer recording sessions with the best game performances chosen to compile into one or more episodes. Each series includes one or two compilation episodes of unaired games from different taping sessions in that series.

=== Games ===
The number and type of games played vary from episode to episode, and whilst some games such as "Questions Only" and "Hoedown" became more common over time, others such as "Authors" and "Remote Control" faded from use. New games were created throughout the show's run. Some games, such as "Tag," are based on traditional improv games, while others are uniquely created for the series. Most games consist of a single long skit performed by the chosen performers, but some, such as "World's Worst" and "Scenes from a Hat," are played as a rapid-fire series of short skits.

While all games are designed to test the performer's improvisational skill, some also test other skills, such as singing or doing impressions. Whose Line? features a number of musical games, which features the show's resident musicians (Richard Vranch or Laura Hall) playing live backing music. Occasionally, pre-recorded music is also used. Some performers, such as Josie Lawrence, Mike McShane, Chip Esten and Wayne Brady, particularly excelled in the musical games, while others, although they were good sports about it, openly despised performing in them, particularly Paul Merton, Stephen Fry and Ryan Stiles. During games like "Rap" and "Hoedown", Fry would almost never even attempt to sing or rap, and instead would just talk about the subject of the song. In one game of Rap, Fry actually did attempt some rapping, albeit half-heartedly, but gave up out of embarrassment after a few words. Stiles would frequently inject insults into the Hoedown whenever he is forced to sing it, usually pointed at Anderson or just the fact he was having to perform a Hoedown yet again. Colin Mochrie would generally speak his lines instead of singing them for musical games.

Some games require suggestions or topics. Depending on the game, these may be solicited directly from the studio audience during the taping, or written down by the audience and/or production staff in advance and then randomly drawn for the performers' use. Anderson used a buzzer to signal the end of a game, or of individual sections in the rapid-fire games.

== Cast ==
The show was presented by Clive Anderson, who is the only person to appear in all 136 episodes. Richard Vranch was the in-house musician for the first nine series (1988–1998). Vranch was replaced by Laura Hall for the tenth and last series (1998–1999).

The following are all the performers who appeared on the show. They are listed in order of number of episodes, with those who appeared in the same number of episodes listed alphabetically:

- Ryan Stiles (92 episodes, 1989–1999)
- Colin Mochrie (71 episodes, 1991–1999)
- Greg Proops (67 episodes, 1989–1999)
- Josie Lawrence (53 episodes, 1988–1998)
- Tony Slattery (48 episodes, 1988–1995)
- Mike McShane (43 episodes, 1988–1997)
- Stephen Frost (33 episodes, 1992–1998)
- John Sessions (24 episodes, 1988–1991)
- Paul Merton (20 episodes, 1988–1993)
- Brad Sherwood (17 episodes, 1992–1999)
- Sandi Toksvig (15 episodes, 1989–1991)
- Jim Sweeney (11 episodes, 1991–1993)
- Rory Bremner (9 episodes, 1988–1998)
- Caroline Quentin (9 episodes, 1995–1996)
- Chip Esten (8 episodes, 1992–1995)
- Archie Hahn (8 episodes, 1988–1992)
- Stephen Fry (7 episodes, 1988–1997)
- Steve Steen (7 episodes, 1991–1993)
- Niall Ashdown (6 episodes, 1995–1996)
- Jonathan Pryce (6 episodes, 1988–1990)
- Ron West (6 episodes, 1989–1992)
- Wayne Brady (5 episodes, 1998–1999)
- Jim Meskimen (4 episodes, 1991–1992)
- Christopher Smith (4 episodes, 1991–1992)
- Phil LaMarr (3 episodes, 1998–1999)
- Karen Maruyama (3 episodes, 1997–1998)
- George McGrath (3 episodes, 1988–1991)
- Rory McGrath (3 episodes, 1988–1990)
- Jimmy Mulville (3 episodes, 1988–1989)
- Catherine O'Hara (3 episodes, 1998–1999)
- Arthur Smith (3 episodes, 1990)
- George Wendt (3 episodes, 1997–1998)
- Jane Brucker (2 episodes, 1992)
- Mark Cohen (2 episodes, 1991)
- Russell Fletcher (2 episodes, 1993)
- Sam Johnson (2 episodes, 1992)
- Neil Mullarkey (2 episodes, 1990)
- Ardal O'Hanlon (2 episodes, 1996)
- Jan Ravens (2 episodes, 1988–1990)
- Griff Rhys Jones (2 episodes, 1988–1989)
- Patrick Bristow (1 episode, 1998)
- Julian Clary (1 episode, 1991)
- Peter Cook (1 episode, 1988)
- Debi Durst (1 episode, 1997)
- Graeme Garden (1 episode, 1988)
- Jon Glover (1 episode, 1988)
- Eddie Izzard (1 episode, 1995)
- Richard Kaplan (1 episode, 1988)
- Chris Langham (1 episode, 1990)
- Enn Reitel (1 episode, 1988)
- Paul Rider (1 episode, 1989)
- Lee Simpson (1 episode, 1990)
- Betty Thomas (1 episode, 1988)
- Denalda Williams (1 episode, 1991)
- Debra Wilson (1 episode, 1998)

== Episodes ==
Series	Episodes	Originally released	
Series	Episodes	First released	Last released
1	13	23 September 1988	16 December 1988
2	17	10 November 1989	16 March 1990
3	17	18 January 1991	10 May 1991
4	13	24 January 1992	17 April 1992
5	9	5 March 1993	30 April 1993
6	11	1 July 1994	6 January 1995
7	12	28 July 1995	26 December 1995
8	14	12 July 1996	24 December 1996
9	19	10 July 1997	19 September 1998
10	11	11 November 1998	4 February 1999

== DVD release ==
The first DVD of the UK show, featuring every episode of the first two series, was released in America on 27 March 2007 by A&E Home Entertainment, and in the UK on 25 January 2008 by Channel 4. The UK edition is edited to remove references to the ad breaks. There were also two VHS releases (in the UK only) during the 1990s.

== Legacy ==
In 1998, shortly before the programme's cancellation by Channel 4, Ryan Stiles introduced the programme's format to fellow comedian Drew Carey, who took great interest and subsequently pitched an American version of the same name to the ABC TV network with great success. Their pitch was to conduct the same variety of improvisational comedy-styled games as the British original, with Carey hosting the programme, and both Stiles and Colin Mochrie being permanent performers. The American version largely maintained the same style as the UK version, with only a few minor variations. As well as Stiles and Mochrie, a few other veterans of the UK original - Wayne Brady, Greg Proops, Brad Sherwood and Chip Esten - also appeared regularly on the show, with Brady very quickly (after the first few episodes as a semi-regular) joining Stiles and Mochrie as a permanent performer. The American version of Whose Line? ran on ABC from 1998 to 2007, and returned with new host Aisha Tyler on The CW from 2013 to 2024.

On 6 March 2011, over twelve years after the series finale, a special edition of the show, with Clive Anderson returning as host, was recorded for "24 Hour Panel People", a marathon of UK panel shows, in aid of Comic Relief. The recording was broadcast live on the Comic Relief website at about 9:30am, while the edited compilation shows for the event were shown between 13 and 17 March on BBC Three. The format was adjusted to feature five performers, with veterans Josie Lawrence, Tony Slattery and Neil Mullarkey appearing alongside Humphrey Ker and David Walliams.

In 2017, a stage-version of the show appeared at the Edinburgh Festival Fringe hosted by Anderson, with original cast members Josie Lawrence, Mike McShane, Greg Proops and Colin Mochrie among the performers. The initial shows were a sell-out and extra dates and shows were put on. Sell-out runs followed at the London Palladium and The Royal Albert Hall, with Chip Esten and Brad Sherwood also returning. In April 2019, it was announced that the stage-version of the show would be returning to the Edinburgh Festival Fringe, with two more original cast members, Tony Slattery and Stephen Frost.

== See also ==
- Whose Line Is It Anyway? (American TV series)
- Mock the Week
- Fast and Loose
- Thank God You're Here
- Kwik Witz
- Improvisation My Dear Mark Watson
- Here We Go
- ComedySportz
- Boom Chicago
- The Second City
