= Richard Vranch =

English comedian and musician

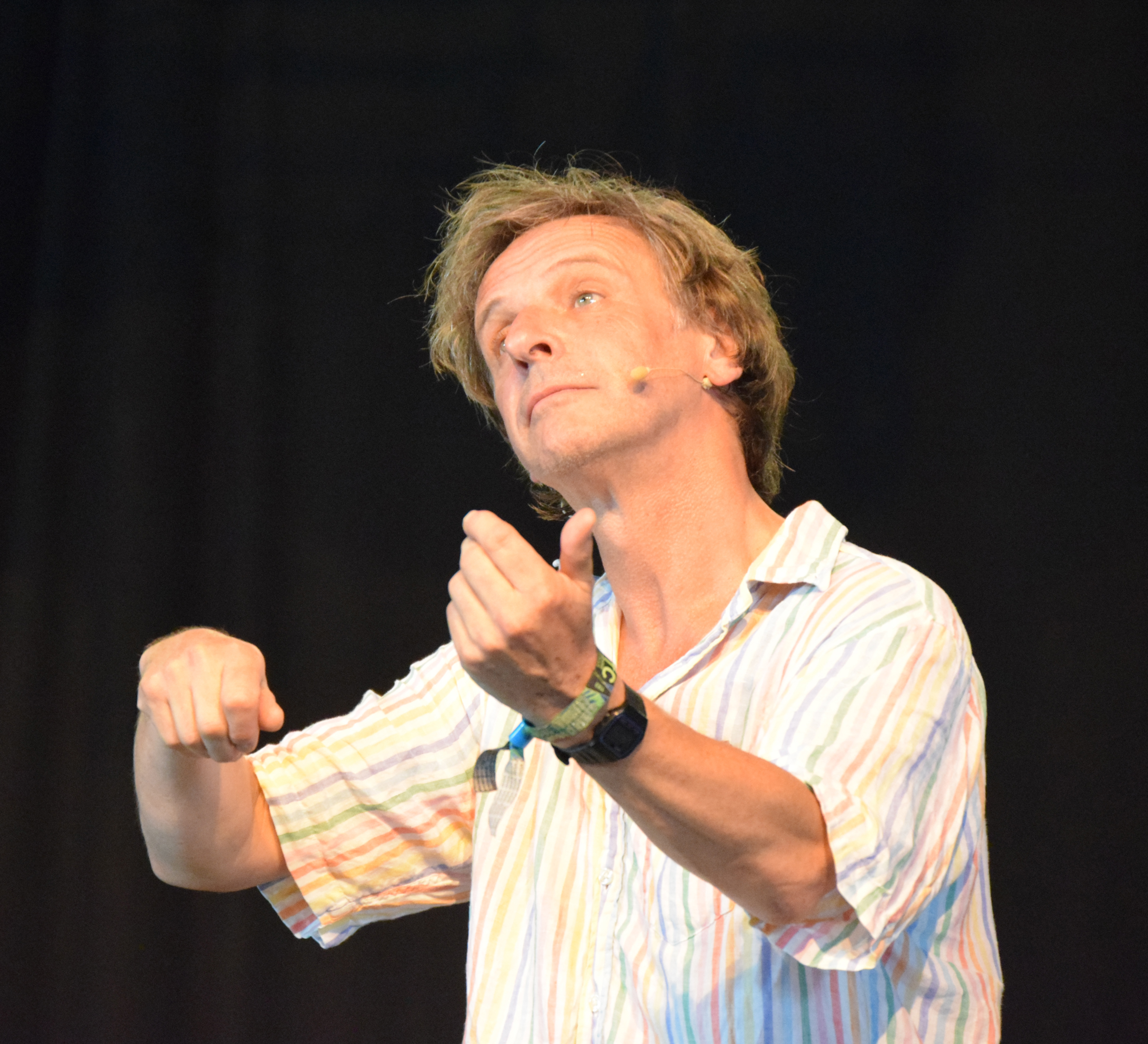
- Richard Vranch performing at the Glastonbury Festival on his 60th birthday, 29 June 2019, with the Stephen Frost Improv All Stars
- Born: Richard Leslie Vranch; 29 June 1959 (age 67); Frome, Somerset, England
- Education: Trinity Hall, Cambridge
- Occupations: Comedian, actor
- Website: richardvranch.com

Richard Leslie Vranch (born 29 June 1959) is an English actor, improviser, comedian, writer and musician. He is known for providing the music for the British TV series Whose Line Is It Anyway?

== Early life ==
Vranch's parents were a teacher and a BT engineer. He attended Bristol Grammar School and Trinity Hall, Cambridge, graduating from the University of Cambridge with BA and PhD degrees in physics. While a first-year doctoral student, he joined the Footlights in 1981 and was a contemporary of Stephen Fry, Hugh Laurie, Morwenna Banks, Tony Slattery and Neil Mullarkey. He was also a member of the Light Entertainment Society and the Cambridge University Mummers.

He was a researcher at the Cavendish Laboratory and a research fellow at St John's College, Oxford, for nine months before going into comedy full-time.

== Career ==
=== Stand-up comedy and improvisation ===
Vranch has performed since 1979. He formed a comedy double-act with Tony Slattery in 1981. The duo hosted the Channel 4 quiz The Music Game and more than 100 episodes of Cue the Music on ITV. He was the improvising pianist and guitarist on the original British television show Whose Line Is It Anyway? from 1988.

He co-wrote and performed in The Paul Merton Show at the London Palladium in 1994. With Pippa the Ripper, he is half of the hula-hoop/science double act Dr Hula. In 2006, he appeared at the Ars Nova theatre, New York, and co-founded the improv storytelling group The YarnBards. In 2012, with others he co-wrote and appeared in the UK tour and West End run of the stage show Paul Merton Out of My Head.

Since at least 1988, Vranch has appeared at London's The Comedy Store. He currently appears there every week with the Comedy Store Players.

=== Voice artist ===
Vranch has voiced TV and radio commercials for companies including British Airways, Lidl and Saab. He also narrates TV documentaries, including the first series of The Hotel Inspector.

=== Acting ===
Acting work includes Dogman, The Dead Set, Hello Mum (1986) and sketch shows. He appeared as Gilmanuk in the audio Doctor Who story "Theatre of War" (Big Finish Productions).

=== Writing ===
He has written for stage, radio and TV, and made several animated films with artist Lucy Allen. They have had their cartoons published in Maxim, Punch and The Spectator. In 2002, he was commissioned by Tamasha Theatre Company (East is East) as a writer for their show Ryman and the Sheik and worked for a few years as an Artistic Associate of the company.

=== Television and radio ===
Vranch presented the children's shows Let's Pretend on ITV and Jackanory on BBC One. He hosted his own science series, Beat That Einstein, on Channel 4 in 1994. He was a guest on You Bet! in 1995 and appeared on BBC Radio 4's long-running panel game Just a Minute in 1999 and in 2005 was a contestant on a charity special of The Weakest Link. He has appeared on the panel shows Puzzle Panel and The Infinite Monkey Cage on Radio 4 and Mind Games on BBC TV. He discussed the switch-on of the Large Hadron Collider in September 2008 with Jeremy Vine and Simon Singh on BBC Radio 2.

In the early 2000s, he presented a radio show, Jammin, with Rowland Rivron on BBC Radio 2.

=== Other ===
Little Britain featured a fictional tower block called Richard Vranch House.
