= Archie Hahn (actor) =

American character actor and improviser (born 1941)

- Born: Charles Archibald Hahn; November 1, 1941 (age 85); Los Angeles, California, U.S.
- Occupations: Actor; voice artist; comedian
- Years active: 1971–present
- Spouse: Carol A. Lee Fashion (m. 1962; div. 1967)
- Relatives: Archie Hahn (grandfather)

Charles Archibald "Archie" Hahn (sometimes credited as Archie Hahn III; born November 1, 1941) is an American character actor and improviser best known for his appearances on the television version of Whose Line is it Anyway?.

== Early life and education ==
Archie Hahn is the son of Archie Hahn Jr. (sometimes called Archie Hahn II) and his wife Edwina (née Fox). The couple lived in Shipley Heights near Wilmington, Delaware, but later moved to Cape Coral in Florida. Hahn has sisters named Edwina and Amy. His grandfather was Olympic sprinter Archie Hahn and he claims descent from Oregon politician George Abernethy and The Lord De La Warr, namesake of Delaware.

He studied at Alexis I. duPont High School in Wilmington. While there, he performed theatre as part of the school's drama club. He later graduated with honors from Valley Forge Military Academy and in 1963 was a pre-med student at the University of Delaware. While living in Wilmington, he worked at the DuPont Experimental Station.

== Career ==
In the 1960s, Hahn moved to California.

In 1971, he appeared in a revival of the play Room Service directed by Howard Storm.

In 1972, Hahn was a member of the improv comedy group The Committee alongside Valerie Curtin, Garry Goodrow, Carl Gottlieb and Harold Oblong.

In 1974, Hahn acted and sang in the film Phantom of the Paradise, also appearing on its soundtrack album.

In 1975, he appeared as a network staffer in the film The Sunshine Boys. The following year, he provided the singing voices for various characters in the musical film Bugsy Malone. He also appeared as newspaper reporter Harold Clemens in the soap opera Mary Hartman, Mary Hartman and reprised the role in the sequel series Forever Fernwood.

== Personal life ==
In December 1962, Hahn married Carol A. Lee Fashion in Wilmington. The couple's divorce was finalised in 1967.

== List of performances ==
=== Film ===
Year	Title	Role	Notes	Ref.
1974	Phantom of the Paradise			
1975	The Sunshine Boys			
1976	Bugsy Malone			

=== Television ===
Year	Title	Role	Notes	Ref.
1976	Mary Hartman, Mary Hartman	Harold Clemens		
1977	Forever Fernwood	Harold Clemens		
1977	Sugar Time!			
1977	It Happened One Christmas		Television film	

=== Theatre ===
Year	Title	Role	Venue	Notes	Ref.
1971	Room Service		Melrose Theater Association, West Hollywood		
