= Steve Steen =

British actor, comedian and musician (born 1954)

- Born: 26 December 1954 (age 71); Lambeth, London, England
- Occupations: Actor, voice actor, comedian, musician

Steve Steen (born 26 December 1954) is a British television, radio and theatre actor and comedian, known for improvisational comedy works.

== Early career ==
Whilst a pupil at Clapham College in London, Steen became friends with Jim Sweeney, and they joined Oval House theatre club in 1972, performing improvised comedy. They wrote and performed in a show that parodied much of the other shows being held in London that year. Then they formed their own theatre company and wrote and toured its productions around the United Kingdom through the 1970s.

== Television ==
In the 1980s Steen and Sweeney moved into television production, appearing together for the first time on TV in the ITV children's show CBTV in 1981, followed by one of Channel 4's first comedies, Little Armadillos. In 1985 Steen appeared in the Ben Elton comedy Happy Families.

Rory Bremner recruited them as resident support performers on his first sketch show for the BBC. In 1987 they starred as the Romantic poets Byron and Coleridge (Steen playing Byron) in an episode, entitled "Ink and Incapability", of the comedy series Blackadder the Third.

Along with Sweeney, Steen appeared in the Channel 4 television improvisational show Whose Line Is It Anyway? for six episodes. He was a guest on the BBC's comedy panel game Have I Got News for You in 1992.

In 2000, Steen played the voice of cartoon gerbil El Nombre.

== Radio ==
Steen had a major roles in Sweeney's award-winning play Danny's Wake, which was subsequently adapted into a sitcom for BBC Radio 4. Steen continued to play the character of Billy throughout the two series. He played the character of Liam in the radio of Any Bloke. He also starred as George Melly in BBC Radio 4's adaptation of the Melly's memoir Owning Up.

== Theatre ==
Steen has performed in improvisation theatre tours, and solo theatre shows playing Bill Bryson in three adaptations of his work by the writer and director Paul Hodson. He also performed in a one-man show about the American comedian John Belushi written by Hodson.

In 2005, Steen appeared at the National Theatre in London as Charles Dickens in Theatre of Blood, based on the 1970 cinema film of the same name.

Steen performs improvisation work with the Comedy Store Players, Paul Merton's Impro Chums, and Stephen Frost's Impro All Stars.

== Personal life ==
Steen lives in Hampshire, he married in 2016.
