= Neil Mullarkey =

English actor

- Born: Watford, Hertfordshire, England
- Education: Kingston Grammar School, Kingston upon Thames
- Alma mater: Robinson College, Cambridge
- Occupations: Speaker and author
- Website: https://neilmullarkey.com/

Neil Mullarkey is an English actor, writer and comedian.

== Early life and education ==
From 1972 to 1979, Mullarkey was educated at Kingston Grammar School, an independent school for boys (now coeducational), in Kingston upon Thames, followed by Robinson College, Cambridge, where he was a member of the Cambridge Footlights and was Junior Treasurer during Tony Slattery's term as president. He became president in 1982 with Nick Hancock, Steve Punt and Hugh Dennis as his contemporaries. Mullarkey formed Hancock & Mullarkey with Hancock, performing their act (which consisted of spoofing television shows' title sequences to that show's accompanying theme music) several times on television. This included Doctor Who, Kojak, and Dad's Army.

== Career ==
Mullarkey has been in a double act with Tony Hawks called the Timid Twins.

In the mid-1980s, he teamed up with Mike Myers as 'Mullarkey and Myers'. They would perform sketches based on their shared love of cartoons, B-movies and bad TV. They played around the burgeoning London pub circuit, particularly at the George IV in Chiswick, where they often shared the bill with the young Hugh Grant, then plying his trade in the Jockeys of Norfolk revue. As their fame increased, Mullarkey and Myers toured the UK, ending in a sold-out season at the Edinburgh Festival.

The two appeared as The Sound Asleep Club on TV-am's Wide Awake Club, a children's TV show hosted at the time by Tommy Boyd. Myers eventually returned to Toronto, but Mullarkey would briefly join him to revive 'Mullarkey and Myers' in Canada. Later still, he appeared in Myers' début in Austin Powers: International Man of Mystery, as the Customs Officer who freaks Austin out with his Swedish-made penis pump. (He also appeared again in Goldmember and helped Mike Myers with uncredited rewrites of So I Married An Axe Murderer).

As a founding member of The Comedy Store Players, he regularly performed on the UK comedy circuit until he retired from The Comedy Store Players in January 2026 after 40 years.

== Theatre ==
He is a founder member of The Comedy Store Players, and appeared with them regularly at London's Comedy Store.

He has written and performed four one-man shows;

- A Bit of Quiet Fun
- Memoirs of Lord Naughty
- All That Mullarkey
- Don't Be Needy Be Succeedy

His book Don't Be Needy Be Succeedy: The A to Z of Motivitality was published by Profile Books in 2008.

== Television ==
On television, his appearances include:

- Whose Line is it Anyway
- The Manageress
- Lovejoy
- Smith and Jones
- Saturday Live
- QI
- Have I Got News For You
- Carrott Confidential
- Paul Merton: The Series
- Absolutely
- Colin's Sandwich

He was a writer on Tony Hawks's show Morris Minor's Marvellous Motors and co-wrote (with Greg Proops) The Amazing Colossal Show for BBC2. He hosted American Freak for America's Comedy Central network.

He also does regular TV advert voiceover work.

== Cinema ==
Mullarkey has acted feature films, including Leon the Pig Farmer, Austin Powers: International Man of Mystery, Austin Powers in Goldmember and Spice World.

== Radio ==
Mullarkey hosted Missed Demeanours for BBC Radio 4, was a regular performer on Bits from Last Week's Radio, co-wrote and starred in FAB TV and has appeared on Just a Minute, The News Quiz, Quote...Unquote, I'm Sorry I Haven't a Clue, Loose Ends, In Touch and The Unbelievable Truth. He wrote and presented the documentary Ten Years of the Comedy Store Players.
