= Sherlock Holmes and The 12 Days of Christmas =

2025 comedy play with songs

- Production artwork
- Original language: English
- Written by: David Reed; Humphrey Ker
- Based on: Characters from Sherlock Holmes by Arthur Conan Doyle
- Music by: Tim Rice (lyrics); Andrew Lloyd Webber (music, Birmingham 2025); Howard Goodall (music, London 2026)
- Genre: Comedy
- Setting: London

Premiere
- Date: 14 November 2025
- Place: Birmingham Repertory Theatre

Sherlock Holmes and the 12 Days of Christmas (also styled Sherlock Holmes and the Twelve Days of Christmas) is a musical comedy play by David Reed and Humphrey Ker (two members of The Penny Dreadfuls). The 2025 Birmingham production featured songs by Tim Rice and Andrew Lloyd Webber; the 2026 London production features songs by Rice and Howard Goodall.

== Plot ==
A series of deaths in the West End embroils Sherlock Holmes and Dr. Watson in a mystery linked to The Twelve Days of Christmas.

== Production ==
=== Birmingham (2025) ===
The play had its world premiere at the Birmingham Repertory Theatre beginning previews 14 November 2025 (with a press night on 20 November) running until 18 January 2026 (after being extended from 11 January due to popular demand), directed by Phillip Breen with Becky Hope-Palmer and designed by Mark Bailey. In addition to writing, Ker and Reed also starred as Holmes and Watson, respectively. The cast also included Margaret Cabourn-Smith as Mrs. Hudson, and John Kearns as Inspector Lestrade. The full cast was announced on 30 September 2025.

=== London (2026) ===
Following the Birmingham run, the play transfers to the Alexandra Palace Theatre in London, with previews from 24 November 2026, an official opening on 1 December 2026, and a run until 17 January 2027. The production is produced by Eleanor Lloyd Productions, Eilene Davidson Productions and Heartaches Limited.

The London production is again directed by Phillip Breen, with songs by Tim Rice and Howard Goodall. The creative team includes Mark Bailey (design), Anna Watson (lighting), Luke Swaffield (sound), Georgina Lamb (choreography and movement), Renny Krupinski (fight direction), Chris Fisher and Will Houstoun (illusions), Helena Palmer (casting) and Leo Munby (musical direction). The London cast was announced on 29 October 2026, with Bo Poraj as Holmes and Marc Antolin as Watson.

== Cast and characters ==
Character	Production	
Character	Birmingham (2025)	London (2026)
Sherlock Holmes	Humphrey Ker	Bo Poraj
Dr. Watson	David Reed	Marc Antolin
Mrs. Hudson	Margaret Cabourn-Smith	Vivien Parry
Inspector Lestrade	John Kearns	John Ramm
Fafner	Christian Andrews	John-Luke Roberts
Ernie	Susan Harrison	Annabel Brook
Arthur Stone	Cameron Johnson	Jonnie Broadbent
Wotan	Andrew Pugsley	Wayne Cater
Queen Victoria	Deborah Tracey	Mia Jerome
Athena Faversham	Helena Wilson	Charlie Russell
Estella Bottle		Olivia-Faith Kamau
Clifford		Mia Overfield
Professor Murray		Emily Pithon
Chorus	Amanda Lindgren, Mia Overfield, Chomba S Taulo	
