= Michael Legge (comedian) =

Northern-Irish comedian (born 1968)

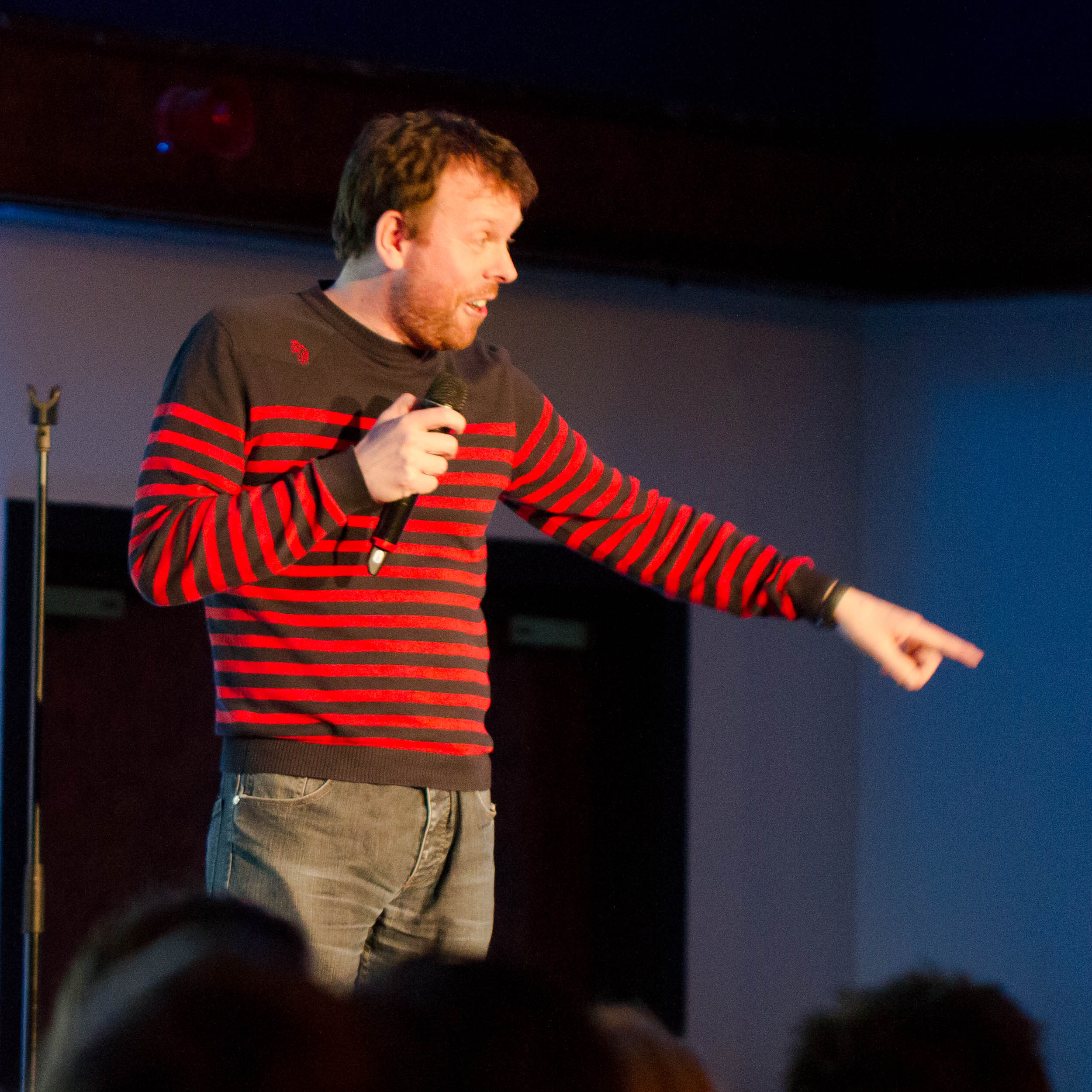
- Legge in 2013
- Born: 12 August 1968 (age 58); Newtownards, Northern Ireland

Comedy career
- Years active: 1991–present
- Medium: Stand-up, television, radio
- Genres: Social satire Observational comedy Absurdist humour
- Website: michaelleggesblog.blogspot.co.uk

Michael Legge (born 12 August 1968) is a London-based Northern-Irish stand-up comedian and television host.

== Career ==
He has written for the BBC, ITV, Channel 4, MTV, VH1 and other media, and has appeared in numerous venues throughout the UK as well as in Australia, United States, Canada, Singapore, the Netherlands, Germany and Dubai.

Legge began performing in 1991 along with writer Stella Duffy and fellow comedian John Gordillo in the London version of the improvised comedy stage show Theatresports. He became Artistic Director of London Theatresports in 1995 and performed in their popular weekly show, Scriptease, at the Tristan Bates Theatre.

He has performed in several Edinburgh Festival shows including The Conversation (2004) with John Voce, The Vagina Monologues (2005), The Clock Hour (2008) and King of Everything (2009) with Johnny Candon.

Legge co-founded and performed in the cult comedy sketch show The Real Daniel O'Donnell Show (2007–2008) at The Albany, London. The monthly show featured Legge along with Paul Litchfield and Jeremy Limb of sketch group The Trap and Margaret Cabourn-Smith and Zoe Gardner of The Congress of Oddities, with contributions from Dan Mersh. It also regularly featured stand-up comedian guests and live bands. The Real Daniel O'Donnell Show spawned the 2008 Edinburgh Festival show The Clock Hour.

Legge was nominated for a BAFTA award for his writing on the MTV website of the show The Osbournes.

His blog won the 2009 Chortle award for Best Off-Stage Contribution.

Legge also co-hosted a podcast called Precious Little Podcast with James Hingley. The podcast regularly featured Legge shouting at everything. Although not officially declared dead, the podcast has been on hiatus since April 2011 and the content removed from the website. Through the podcast, Legge occasionally filled in for Richard Herring on his BBC 6 Music radio show with Andrew Collins.

After Martin White left, Legge co-hosted The Dave Gorman Show on Absolute Radio alongside Gorman and Danielle Ward.

Legge's first solo show was Curse Sir Walter Raleigh, which debuted at the Edinburgh Festival in 2011. In 2012 Legge produced What A Shame, which he recorded for a future album release in March 2013. Legge has also recorded Pointless Anger, Righteous Ire, an improvised show alongside Robin Ince.

He is a team captain on Danielle Ward's comedy podcast Do the Right Thing, alongside Margaret Cabourn-Smith.

For Comic Relief in March 2013, Legge wrote a blog continuously for 25 hours, raising more than £2,500 for the charity.

In 2014, Legge appeared in the second series of The Alternative Comedy Experience.

Legge started the podcast Vitriola Music in 2015 with fellow comedian Robin Ince.

Legge has also performed warm-up for television shows such as 8 Out of 10 Cats, Would I Lie to You? and many others. Before becoming a professional comedian, Legge featured in several TV commercials.

== Personal life ==
Legge is a vegan. In 2015, he pulled out of a performance at Vegfest because a representative from UKIP would also be at the same event.
