= Tim Rice =

English lyricist and author (born 1944)

Sir Tim Rice
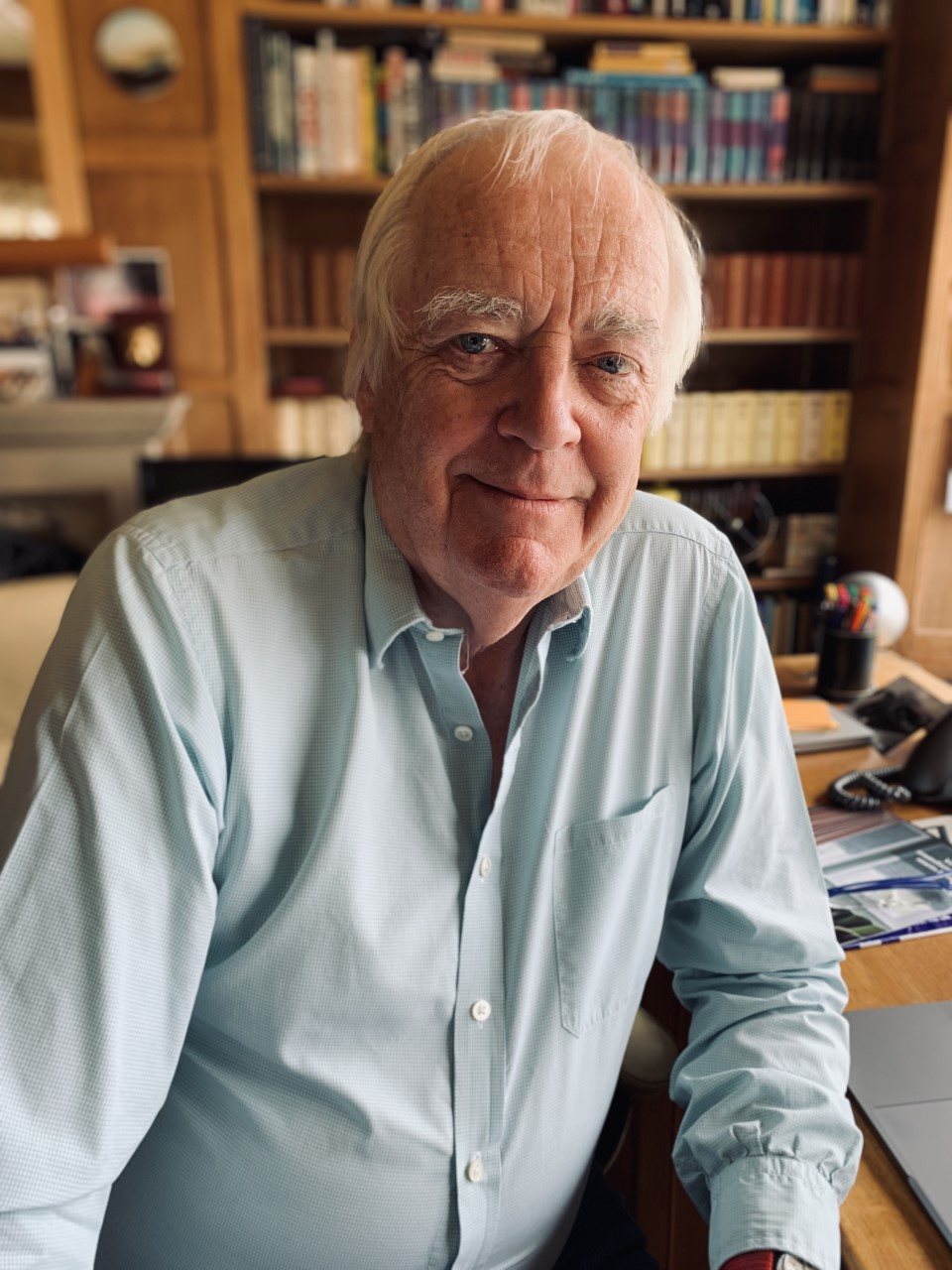
- Rice in 2020

Background information
- Born: Timothy Miles Bindon Rice; 10 November 1944 (age 82); Shardeloes, Buckinghamshire, England
- Origin: Amersham, Buckinghamshire, England
- Genres: Musical theatre; film; television
- Occupations: Songwriter, lyricist, author
- Years active: 1966–present
- Website: timrice.co.uk

Sir Timothy Miles Bindon Rice (born 10 November 1944) is an English songwriter. He is best known for his collaborations with Andrew Lloyd Webber, with whom he wrote, among other shows, Joseph and the Amazing Technicolor Dreamcoat, Jesus Christ Superstar, and Evita; Chess (with Björn Ulvaeus and Benny Andersson of ABBA); Aida (with Elton John); and, for Disney, Aladdin (with Alan Menken), The Lion King (with Elton John), and the stage adaptation of Beauty and the Beast (with Menken). He also wrote lyrics for the Alan Menken musical King David, and for DreamWorks Animation's The Road to El Dorado (with John).

Rice was knighted by Elizabeth II for services to music in 1994. He has a star on the Hollywood Walk of Fame, is a 1999 inductee into the Songwriters Hall of Fame and is the 2023 recipient of its Johnny Mercer Award, is a Disney Legend recipient, and is a fellow of the British Academy of Songwriters, Composers, and Authors. In addition to his awards in the UK, he is one of twenty-eight artists to have won an Emmy, Oscar, Grammy, and Tony in the US.

Rice twice hosted the Brit Awards (in 1983 and 1984). The 2020 Sunday Times Rich List values Rice's wealth at £155m, making him the 21st-richest music millionaire in the UK.

== Early life ==
Rice was born at Shardeloes, a historic English country house near Amersham, Buckinghamshire, in 1944, that was requisitioned as a maternity hospital during the Second World War. His father, Hugh Gordon Rice (1917–1988), served with the Eighth Army and reached the rank of major during the Second World War, and afterward worked for the De Havilland Aircraft Company, becoming Far East representative, and for the Diplomatic Service, including as adviser to the Ministry of Overseas Development at Amman, Jordan. Rice's mother, Joan Odette (née Bawden; 1919–2009), daughter of an entrepreneur in the London fashion trade, served in the Women's Auxiliary Air Force (WAAF) as a photographic interpreter, and in her eighties became known as a writer on the publication of her wartime diaries.

== Education ==
Rice was educated at three independent schools: Aldwickbury School in Hertfordshire, St Albans School and Lancing College. He left Lancing with GCE A-Levels in History and French and then started work as an articled clerk for a law firm in London, having decided not to apply for a university place. He later attended the Sorbonne in Paris for a year.

== Career ==
=== Music industry ===
After studying for a year in Paris at the Sorbonne, Rice joined EMI Records as a management trainee in 1966.

In the liner notes of the 2006 CD compilation That's my Story, (Sunbeam Catalogue No.: SBRCD5017) Rice notes that he played tambourine on Ross Hannaman's "I'll give all my Love to Southend"), whom he briefly managed.

When EMI producer Norrie Paramor left to set up his own organization in 1968, Rice joined him as an assistant producer, working with, among others, Cliff Richard and the Scaffold.

=== Musical theatre ===
Rice became famous for his collaborations with Andrew Lloyd Webber, with whom he wrote Joseph and the Amazing Technicolor Dreamcoat, Jesus Christ Superstar, Evita, Cricket, The Likes of Us, and additional songs for the 2011 West End production of The Wizard of Oz. Joseph and Superstar were additionally known as two of the first hit musicals that drew their sound from the rock and pop music that became embedded in culture in the 1960s.

For The Walt Disney Company, Rice has collaborated individually with Alan Menken and Elton John, creating productions including Aladdin (winning an Academy Award for Best Original Song, Golden Globe and Grammy Award for Song of the Year for "A Whole New World" in 1992, also Rice's only US number one single to date) and The Lion King (winning an Academy Award and Golden Globe for "Can You Feel the Love Tonight" in 1994).

In 1996, his collaboration with Lloyd Webber for the film version Evita won Rice his third Academy Award for Best Original Song with the song "You Must Love Me". Rice has also collaborated with Björn Ulvaeus and Benny Andersson of ABBA on Chess, which includes the UK number one single "I Know Him So Well", sung by Elaine Paige and Barbara Dickson. He has collaborated with Rick Wakeman on the albums 1984 and Cost of Living. In 2009, Rice wrote the lyrics for Andrei Konchalovsky's critically panned reimagining of The Nutcracker, set to the music of Pyotr Ilyich Tchaikovsky.

Rice reunited with Andrew Lloyd Webber in 2011 to pen new songs for Lloyd Webber's newest production of The Wizard of Oz which opened in March 2011 at the London Palladium. Rice has since, however, rejected working with Lloyd Webber again, claiming their partnership has run its course, and they are "no longer relevant as a team".

In 2025, it was announced that Rice and Lloyd Webber will reunite to create the original songs for a new comedy play Sherlock Holmes and The 12 Days of Christmas by David Reed and Humphrey Ker (from the British sketch comedy troupe The Penny Dreadfuls) which will open in November for the Christmas season at the Birmingham Repertory Theatre.

=== Media ===
On 9 November 1979, Rice hosted a highly publicised edition of Friday Night, Saturday Morning on the BBC which had a heated debate on the newly released film Monty Python's Life of Brian, a film that had been banned by many local councils and caused protests throughout the world with accusations that it was blasphemous (as the lyricist of Jesus Christ Superstar, Rice himself had been accused of blasphemy a decade before). To argue in favour of this accusation were veteran broadcaster and noted Christian Malcolm Muggeridge and Mervyn Stockwood (the Bishop of Southwark). In defence of the film were two members of the Monty Python team, John Cleese and Michael Palin.

Rice has also been a frequent guest panellist for many years on the radio panel games Just a Minute and Trivia Test Match. He also made an appearance in the film About a Boy. The film includes several clips from an edition of the game show Countdown on which he was the guest adjudicator. His other interests include cricket (he was president of the Marylebone Cricket Club in 2002) and maths. He wrote the foreword to the book Why Do Buses Come in Threes by Rob Eastaway and Jeremy Wyndham, and featured prominently in Tony Hawks's One Hit Wonderland, where he co-wrote the song which gave Hawks a top twenty hit in Albania. On 2 December 2010 he addressed the eighth Bradman Oration in Adelaide. In October 2011 and November 2016 to February 2017, Rice was guest presenter for the BBC Radio 2 show Sounds of the '60s, standing in for regular presenter Brian Matthew who was unwell.

Beginning in the lockdowns due to the COVID-19 pandemic, in partnership with Broadway Podcast Network, Rice has presented Get Onto My Cloud, a podcast retrospective of his career. A number of episodes feature verbatim excerpts of his autobiography and all include various recordings of his and other associated musicians' work.

=== Literature ===
He released his autobiography Oh What a Circus: The Autobiography of Tim Rice in 1998, which covered his childhood and early adult life until the opening of the original London production of Evita in 1978. He also took part in the Bush Theatre's 2011 project Sixty-Six Books for which he wrote a piece based upon a book of the King James Bible.

Rice was the president of the London Library, the largest independent lending library in Europe from 2017 to 2022.

=== Publishing ===
Along with his brother, Jo, and the radio presenters Mike Read and Paul Gambaccini, he was a co-founder of the Guinness Book of British Hit Singles and served as an editor from 1977 to 1996. In September 1981, Rice, along with Colin Webb and Michael Parkinson, launched Pavilion Books, a publishing house with a publishing focus on music and the arts. He held it until 1997.

=== Patronage ===
Rice is a patron of the London-based drama school, Associated Studios and was for several years, a patron of Thame Players Theatre along with Bruce Alexander.

=== Honours ===
Rice was made a Knight Bachelor by Queen Elizabeth II in 1994 (entitling him to the address "Sir Tim Rice" or "Sir Tim"), was inducted into the Songwriters Hall of Fame in 1999, and was named a Disney Legend in 2002.

In 2008, Rice received a star on the Hollywood Walk of Fame.

He is a fellow member of the British Academy of Songwriters, Composers and Authors.

== Personal life ==
On 19 August 1974, Rice married Jane Artereta, daughter of Colonel Alexander Henry McIntosh, OBE, and former wife of producer and talent agent Michael Whitehall, the couple having met while working at Capital Radio. The marriage unravelled in the late 1980s after the British tabloid newspapers revealed that he had been conducting an affair with the singer Elaine Paige. Jane retains the title Lady Rice as, despite obtaining a divorce decree nisi, the couple never made it absolute and therefore they remain legally married.

Lady Rice manages the family's 33,000-acre Dundonnell estate which Sir Tim Rice bought in 1998 for £2 million. She has won awards for her conservation work with red squirrels. They have two children, Eva Jane Florence, a novelist and singer-songwriter, and Donald Alexander Hugh, a film director and theatre producer who also helps to run Dundonnell. Eva, who was named after Eva Perón, is the author of the novel The Lost Art of Keeping Secrets, which was a finalist for the British Book Award Best Read of the Year.

Rice has a second daughter, Zoe Joan Eleanor, from a relationship with Nell Sully, an artist. He has a third daughter, Charlotte Cordelia Violet Christina, from a relationship with Laura-Jane Foley, a writer. He has seven grandchildren.

Despite having no familial or personal ties to the club, Rice has been a fan of Sunderland AFC since his early childhood.

=== Political views ===
Previously a supporter of the Conservative Party, in 2007 Rice stated that the party were no longer interested in him and that his relationship with them had "irrevocably changed." Rice and Andrew Lloyd Webber, both supporters of Margaret Thatcher, attended her funeral in 2013.

Rice raised funds for the Euro No campaign in 2000. In 2014, he donated £7,500 to the UK Independence Party. In May 2016, he told The Spectator that he would vote for Brexit in the following month's referendum on the issue, saying: "It would be good to spend one's final years as part of a truly independent nation once more." He said he had voted to remain in the European Economic Community in 1975 "from a standpoint of ignorance".

=== Religion ===
Describing his religion, Rice stated in a 1982 interview, "Technically I'm Church of England, which is really nothing. But I don't follow it. I wouldn't say I was a Christian. I have nothing against it." Conversely, he also stated that he adapted the Biblical stories of Joseph and Jesus to musicals because "I'd always rather take a true story over an untrue one."

=== Wealth ===
According to The Sunday Times Rich List of the UK's richest millionaires, Rice is worth £155 million as of 2020.

In 2015, Rice expressed his indebtedness to the journalist Angus McGill as "the man responsible for Andrew Lloyd Webber and I having our first song recorded". Speaking at McGill's funeral, Rice told a tale from his days at EMI about trying to rig the results of the London Evening Standard Girl of the Year competition in 1967. As "glorified office boy", Rice was writing songs with Lloyd Webber and desperate to find anybody to record one of their songs. Rice and colleagues filled in 5,000 entry forms overnight voting for the contestant who was a singer, and delivered them to McGill, who supervised the competition. Rice said it was "a disgraceful act of dishonesty on my part... without actually breaking the rules". As a result, the Standard proclaimed two Girls of the Year and Rice's choice, Rosalind ("Ross") Hannaman, was signed to EMI, where she made her first record. Rice said at the funeral: "I owe [Angus] an awful lot, which is just one of the reasons why I'm here today."

== Musical theatre ==
- 1968 – Joseph and the Amazing Technicolor Dreamcoat with music by Andrew Lloyd Webber
- 1970 – Jesus Christ Superstar with music by Andrew Lloyd Webber
- 1976 – Evita with music by Andrew Lloyd Webber
- 1983 – Blondel with music by Stephen Oliver
- 1984 – Chess with music by Benny Andersson and Björn Ulvaeus
- 1986 – Cricket with music by Andrew Lloyd Webber
- 1992 – Tycoon with music by Michel Berger (English-language adaptation of the 1979 French musical Starmania, with original French lyrics by Luc Plamondon)
- 1994 – Beauty and the Beast with music by Alan Menken for 9 new songs; remaining songs feature the lyrics of Howard Ashman, as written for the 1991 film.
- 1996 – Heathcliff with music by John Farrar
- 1997 – The Lion King with music by Elton John
- 1997 – King David with music by Alan Menken
- 2000 – Aida with music by Elton John
- 2005 – The Likes of Us with music by Andrew Lloyd Webber (written in 1965, but first staged at the Sydmonton Festival on 9 July 2005)
- 2011 – The Wizard of Oz with music by Andrew Lloyd Webber for 6 new songs; also additional lyrics for 4 songs with music by Harold Arlen and lyrics by E.Y. Harburg. The remaining 13 songs are solely by Arlen and Harburg.
- 2011 – Aladdin with music by Alan Menken and additional lyrics by Howard Ashman and Chad Beguelin. Based on the film.
- 2013 – From Here to Eternity with music by Stuart Brayson, based on the James Jones novel of the same name
- 2025 – Sherlock Holmes and The 12 Days of Christmas, comedy play by David Reed and Humphrey Ker, with original songs by Rice and Andrew Lloyd Webber

== Film and television work ==
In addition to adaptations of his theatrical productions, Rice has worked on several original film and television projects:

- 1983 – Octopussy; theme song "All Time High" with music by John Barry and sung by Rita Coolidge
- 1992 – Aladdin with music and score by Alan Menken; completed work begun by Howard Ashman
- 1994 – The Lion King with music by Elton John, score by Hans Zimmer
- 2000 – The Road to El Dorado with music by Elton John, score by Hans Zimmer and John Powell
- 2009 – The Nutcracker in 3D with music by Pyotr Ilyich Tchaikovsky and score by Eduard Artemyev
- 2017 – Beauty and the Beast with music and score by Alan Menken; additional three songs
- 2019 – Aladdin with music and score by Alan Menken; new compositions with Pasek and Paul
- 2019 – The Lion King with music by Elton John and score by Hans Zimmer

== Lyricist ==
- "Christmas Dream", written by Andrew Lloyd Webber and sung by Perry Como for The Odessa File (1974).
- "It's Easy for You", recorded by Elvis Presley on his album Moody Blue.
- "Legal Boys", recorded by Elton John on his album Jump Up!
- 1981 concept album 1984 composed by Rick Wakeman and inspired by the George Orwell novel of the same name.
- "The Second Time", "The Last One to Leave", "Hot As Sun" and "Falling Down to Earth" on Elaine Paige's 1981 self-titled album
- "All Time High", the theme tune for the James Bond film Octopussy, written with John Barry and sung by Rita Coolidge (1983).
- "A Winter's Tale", written with Mike Batt and recorded by David Essex (1982).
- "The Fallen Priest" and "The Golden Boy" for Freddie Mercury's 1988 album Barcelona.
- "The Monkey And The Onion" with music by Graham Gouldman performed as 10cc on their final album Mirror Mirror (1995)
- "Warthog Rhapsody" and a reworking of "Hakuna Matata" (both written with Elton John) for Rhythm of the Pride Lands (1995).
- "That's All I Need", written with Elton John, for The Lion King 1½ (2004). Snippets of songs originally written by the pair for The Lion King also feature in the film.
- "Peterloo", was requested by Sir Malcolm Arnold's estate to write lyrics to the Peterloo Overture [commemorating the horrific St Peter's Fields Massacre and maiming of men, women and children at a meeting in Manchester in Aug 1819]. There was in mind to use it in 2012 for the Olympics or for the Queen's Jubilee celebrations [60 years on throne] but instead it had its premiere at the Royal Albert Hall in London at 'The Last Night of the Proms' on Saturday 13 September 2014 which was broadcast on BBC television.
- "A Matter of Love" Lyrics written by Rice for Taiwanese Prince of Ballads Jeff Chang (January 2021)

== Compilation albums ==
- In 1994, a compilation album was released containing some of Rice's best known co-written songs being sung by various artists, titled I Know Them So Well – The Best of Tim Rice (Any Dream Will Do in some countries).

== Other work ==
- From 1979 to 1982, Rice was co-host of the BBC2 chat show Friday Night, Saturday Morning.
- Made a rare appearance in an acting role as a newscaster reporting a plane crash in the 1981 Australian horror film The Survivor.
- Co-produced the 1986 London and 1988 Broadway productions of Chess as a partner in 3 Knights Ltd with Benny Andersson and Björn Ulvaeus.
- Co-produced the 1989 London production of Anything Goes as a partner in Anchorage Productions with Elaine Paige.
- Co-produced, with Andrew Powell, Elaine Paige's 1981 self-titled album
- Occasional panellist on the BBC Radio 4 panel game Just a Minute
- Appears as host of the BBC Radio 2 weekly series Tim Rice's American Pie which explores the music and musicians of each state in the USA.

Awards and achievements
Preceded by Ronnie Corbett	President of Lord's Taverners; 1988–1990	Succeeded by Leslie Crowther
