= Sketchorama =

- Genre: Comedy
- Running time: 25 minutes
- Country of origin: United Kingdom
- Language: English
- Home station: BBC Radio 4
- Starring: Humphrey Ker (Series 1); Thom Tuck (Series 2 - 3); Isy Suttie (Series 4)
- Created by: Gus Beattie
- Produced by: Gus Beattie; The Comedy Unit
- Original release: June 2012 – August 2015
- No. of series: 4
- No. of episodes: 16
- Audio format: Stereophonic sound
- Website: At BBC Radio 4

Sketchorama is a radio show created by The Comedy Unit for BBC Radio 4. It featured a rotating cast of comedic sketch groups who performed in front of a live audience. The groups were introduced by a host comedian on each series: Humphrey Ker, Thom Tuck or Isy Suttie. The shows final series was in August 2015.

== Episodes ==
=== Series 1 ===
Episode	Title	Hosted By	Featuring	Original release date
1	"Episode 1"	Humphrey Ker	Delete the Banjax, Lady Garden, Idiots of Ants	26 June 2012
2	"Episode 2"	Humphrey Ker	Noise Next Door, the Boom Jennies, Jigsaw	3 July 2012
3	"Episode 3"	Humphrey Ker	Three Englishmen, Max and Ivan, Frisky & Mannish	10 July 2012
4	"Episode 4"	Humphrey Ker	How Do I Get Up There?, The Ginge, The Geordie and The Geek, Pappy's	17 July 2012

=== Series 2 ===
Episode	Title	Hosted By	Featuring	Original release date
1	"Episode 1"	Thom Tuck	the Beta Males, Shirley & Shirley, Jonny and the Baptists	29 April 2013
2	"Episode 2"	Thom Tuck	So On and So Forth, That Pair, Sheeps	6 May 2013
3	"Episode 3"	Thom Tuck	McNeill & Pamphilon, Barbershopera and Wittank	13 May 2013
4	"Episode 4"	Thom Tuck	Absolutely, Endemic	20 May 2013

=== Series 3 ===
Episode	Title	Hosted By	Featuring	Original release date
1	"Episode 1"	Thom Tuck	Croft and Pearce, Beasts and Casual Violence	23 June 2014
2	"Episode 2"	Thom Tuck	Mixed Doubles, the Real MacGuffins, Bob and Jim	30 June 2014
3	"Episode 3"	Thom Tuck	Four Screws Loose, The Jest, Birthday Girls	7 July 2014
4	"Episode 4"	Thom Tuck	The Color Ham, Lead Pencil, Foil	14 August 2014

=== Series 4 ===
Episode	Title	Hosted By	Featuring	Original release date
1	"Episode 1"	Isy Suttie	The Twins Macabre, Massive Dad, The Penny Dreadfuls	6 July 2015
1	"Episode 1"	Isy Suttie	Clever Peter, Hennessey and Friends, In Cahoots	13 July 2015
3	"Episode 3"	Isy Suttie	Frisky & Mannish, Thünderbards, Lazy Susan	30 July 2015
4	"Episode 4"	Isy Suttie	Aunty Donna, Gein's Family Gift Shop, Beasts	26 August 2015

=== Specials ===
Episode	Title	Hosted By	Featuring	Original release date
1	"Episode 1"	Thom Tuck	Croft & Pearce, Mixed Doubles, Bob & Jim	27 December 2014

== Production ==
Producer Gus Beattie began the show after noticing there weren’t many shows showcasing sketch talent. Beattie chose which sketch groups performed on the show and found many of the groups at the Edinburgh Festival and online. The chosen groups gather at the Royal Academy of Dramatic Art to perform before a live audience.

== Reception ==
The British Comedy Guide described it as "a format for Radio 4 which offers the same popular showcase dynamic as stand-up shows, but purely for comedy sketch groups. Sketchorama aimed to bring hidden gems and established live acts to the airwaves offering a truly distinctive and ambitious show."
