= The Wrong Door =

British comedy TV series

- Genre: Comedy
- Written by: Ben Wheatley; Jack Cheshire (Lead writers)
- Directed by: Ben Wheatley
- Starring: List of performers
- Country of origin: United Kingdom
- No. of series: 1
- No. of episodes: 7 (with highlights show)

Production
- Running time: 30 minutes

Original release
- Network: BBC Three
- Release: 28 August – 2 October 2008

The Wrong Door is a comedy sketch show, that first aired on BBC Three on 28 August 2008. The sketch show was set in a parallel universe, employing a mix of celebrity cameos, impractical locations and CGI visual effects. As such, it was initially produced under the working title of The CGI Sketch Show. The show contained strong language, adult humour and toilet humour.

== Cast ==
Unlike many sketch shows, the programme did not have a core cast of performers. However, some actors can reoccur in other roles throughout the series. The performers involved included Brian Blessed, Gina Bellman, Matt Berry, MyAnna Buring, Lucy Cudden, Michael Fenton Stevens, Neil Fox, Simon Greenall, Laurence Hobbs, Rasmus Hardiker, Pippa Haywood, Humphrey Ker, Burt Kwouk, Alex MacQueen, David Reed, Michael Smiley, Thom Tuck, Lorna Watson and Lloyd Woolf.

== Episodes ==
Each episode in the series has a different narrative strand running through it:

=== Episode 1: The World's Most Annoying Creature ===
In pursuit of creating the ultimate soldier, a bio-weapons laboratory produces "The World's Most Annoying Creature," which promptly manages to escape. This creation was initially showcased on August 28, 2008.

=== Episode 2: Njarnia ===
Edmund and Lucy wander through the back of their self-assembly wardrobe and find themselves in the magical, but slightly rubbish, the world of Njarnia (a reference to IKEA product naming, and Narnia). It was first shown on 6 September 2008.

=== Episode 3: The Smutty Aliens ===
A woman is abducted by aliens with rude names and a phallic spaceship. It was first shown on 11 September 2008.

=== Episode 4: The Train Pirates ===
A group of ordinary commuters transforms into pirates, led by Captain Goiter portrayed by Brian Blessed. This entertaining scenario was first aired on October 18, 2008.

=== Episode 5: The Wizard of Office ===
Dorothy is transported to an office in Oswestry after a storm, in a twist on The Wizard of Oz. Also, the London Underground is infested with Pac-Man and a restaurant has a problem with its Death by Chocolate. It was first shown on 25 October 2008.

=== Episode 6: Bondo ===
In a whimsical plot, the undercover clown agent Bondo endeavours to thwart a ninja conspiracy aimed at destroying the Train Pirates, while Xotang finds himself in need of a holiday. This entertaining episode was first broadcast on October 2, 2008.

A highlights show was broadcast on 26 October 2008.

== Music ==
While the series does feature original music composed by Dominic Nunns, it also uses a six tracks of licensed music. This is a partial listing of the licensed music used in the series (as originally broadcast).

Blondie	Heart of Glass	End Credits of Episode 2
Graham Coxon	Freakin' Out	End Credits of Episode 3
Kasabian	Club Foot	End Credits of Episode 6
Rob Dougan	Clubbed To Death (Kurayamino Variation)	End Credits of Episode 1
Transfixion	Over the Rainbow	End Credits of Episode 5
Vampire Weekend	A-Punk	Dancing Game Girl sketch

== Production ==
The Wrong Door was directed by Ben Wheatley and Jack Cheshire as well as a large writing team, including Phillip Barron, John Camm, the Dawson Brothers, Ollie Aplin, Tim Inman, Susy Kane, Will Maclean, and Bert Tyler-Moore. (A full credits list can be found at the BBC's own The Wrong Door website).

== Recurring characters and sketches ==
Similar to other comedy shows, this show has a number of reoccurring characters and sketches throughout every episode.

=== Philip and Melanie ===
Melanie has boyfriend trouble. Philip is rather insensitive and many of her friends and family think he's "a wanker". He left his previous employment at Nottingham Trent University due to a number of anger management issues. He has a curious habit of tearing people to pieces, being, as he is, a large carnivorous dinosaur.

The Philip and Melanie sketches are examples of deadpan humour. They often involve other characters in the scene treating the couple as if it were perfectly normal for a young female human to be dating a dinosaur, yet picking up on other curiosities such as their age gap.

=== Xotang ===
Xotang, the giant robot, is frequently observed causing inadvertent destruction to his surroundings while performing mundane tasks, such as searching for his keys by demolishing the London skyline. Remarkably, despite his destructive actions, no one makes attempts to harm him, allowing Xotang to carry on with his activities without facing consequences for the havoc he unintentionally wreaks in his vicinity.

=== Gamer Girl ===
Gamer Girl is a stereotypical gamer character, characterised by the official website of the show as a "classic example of the perils of console addiction." The sketches featuring Gamer Girl often depict her world merging with the game she is currently playing, or vice versa, highlighting the challenges and humorous aspects of her enthusiasm for gaming.

=== Superhero Tryouts ===
A parody of the popular talent show genre of television, Superhero Tryouts is a fictional television show looking for the next popular superhero. Hosted and judged by Captain Justice, Lady Libido and Doctor Fox, the show is plagued largely by mediocre superheroes. Such contestants include:

- The Human Spider, who excretes web-like substances from his anus.
- Moose-Boy, who has no obvious super powers at all, other than his own theme tune and a helmet featuring moose antlers, and whose origin story was merely being attacked by a moose.
- The Raven, a reference to Batman, who has no powers, but instead a body "honed to perfection" and a grapple gun. Upon Raven falling from the rafters, Captain Justice recognises him as a billionaire playboy called Bobby.
- Rocket Man, whose rocket-powered jetpack sets him on fire and spins him around uncontrollably.
- Tempus, who has the power to stop time. Although initially unable to convince the judges of his power, his more convincing demonstrations are discounted as he had been disqualified.
- A shapeshifter who can transform only into furniture featured on page 12 of the IKEA catalogue.
- A telepath who can only read the minds of Belgians.
- A superhero with the ability to picture the shape of people's genitals through handshakes.
- An elderly, near-deaf, wheelchair-using man able to fly through farting.
- The Flame, who is constantly on fire but has no pyrokinetic abilities. (In other sketches entitled "Adventures of the Flame", his intervention often results in the scene of a crime or accident exploding or burning down.)
- Speedo, a speedster (one of the few successful contestants).

=== Dancers ===
Two dancers competing to see which one is better. The one in the red tracksuit dances normally, but the one in the blue tracksuit always has a special ability.

=== Snooker Hall ===
Two people are playing snooker when a man in a black dress coat and white tie appears. He takes the cue from one of the players and then makes a bet with the other. The mystery man then proceeds to perform an impossible trick shot (which is done in CGI), takes his winnings and leaves while the remaining player stares in shock.

== Reception ==
Initial reviews for episode one were mixed. There were enthusiastic reviews in The Guardian, Heat magazine and The Times; a review in the Daily Record described it as "inventive, exhilarating, rude and sometimes astonishing sketch show combines sharp writing and performing with sci-fi standard special effects to create a whole new breed of futuristic comedy". However, elsewhere it was not so well received; Metro gave it one star, whereas a review in The Scotsman described it as having "agonisingly poor material".

The programme's launch episode's ratings, however, were very good, gaining 546,000 (a 3.5% share), the highest ever audience for the launch of a comedy on BBC Three. Despite this, the second episode and beyond dropped off of the channel's top ten weekly ratings, according to BARB statistics.

== Release ==
Series 1 was released on DVD on 26 July 2010.
