= Khan and Salinsky =

British playwriting partnership

- Occupation: Playwrights
- Writing career
- Notable works: Coalition, Making News, Kingmaker, Impossible, Brexit, The Gang of Three, In The Print

Khan and Salinsky are a British playwriting partnership consisting of Robert Khan and Tom Salinsky. Active since the early 2010s, they are known for a series of political and historical satires staged at the Edinburgh Festival Fringe and in London theatres, including Coalition (2012), Making News (2013), Kingmaker (2014–15), Impossible (2015), Brexit (2018), The Gang of Three (2025) and In The Print (2026). Their works have been reviewed in national publications including The Times, The Guardian, The Observer, The Scotsman, The Stage and The Spectator.

== Background ==
=== Robert Khan ===
Robert Khan studied law at the University of Cambridge and the University of Southampton. He worked in public policy and government, serving for eight years as an Islington councillor and as the borough’s Arts Champion. He is Chair of the Board of the King's Head Theatre.

=== Tom Salinsky ===
Tom Salinsky is Artistic Director of The Spontaneity Shop. He is co-author of The Improv Handbook (Bloomsbury Methuen Drama) and has written additional books for Pen & Sword. Salinsky teaches communication and storytelling internationally. He is producer of the podcast The Guilty Feminist and co-creator and host of the film podcast Best Pick. His book Best Pick: A Journey Through Film History was published by Rowman & Littlefield.

== Playwriting career ==
=== Coalition (2012) ===
Coalition premiered at the Pleasance Dome during the 2012 Edinburgh Festival Fringe. It starred Thom Tuck Reviews included:

- The Times: "Real class — don’t miss it".
- The Scotsman: "slick and funny".
- Metro: praised its "cracking dialogue".
- Sunday Express: called it "an absolute gem".

=== Making News (2013) ===
Making News premiered at Pleasance One during the 2013 Fringe. The Times wrote that the show had "more punch than a Paxman interrogation".

=== Kingmaker (2014–2015) ===
Kingmaker opened at Pleasance Beneath and later transferred to the St James Theatre and the Arts Theatre. The Times reviewed it on multiple occasions. The Observer discussed its exploration of political leadership.

=== Impossible (2015) ===
Impossible examines the relationship between Harry Houdini and Arthur Conan Doyle. Reviews included:

- The Scotsman: "Intriguing… enjoyable… told with terrific style".
- Libby Purves in TheatreCat: "A winner".
- Edinburgh Evening News: ★★★★.

=== Brexit (2018) ===
Brexit premiered at Pleasance Beyond and transferred to the King’s Head Theatre. Reviews included:

- The Scotsman: ★★★★★ — "Deliciously played… wonderful".
- The Times: covered the play in a feature on Brexit-themed Fringe shows.
- Daily Business (Daily Business Magazine): described the play as "razor sharp".

=== The Gang of Three (2025) ===
The Gang of Three premiered at the King’s Head Theatre in 2025. Reviews included:

- The Stage.
- The Guardian: "inside an old boys’ club of Labour intrigue".
- The Spectator: "Khan and Salinsky capture the characters beautifully".
- The House (The House Magazine).
- Islington Gazette and related local press.
- The Reviews Hub.
- The Arts Desk.

Additional political commentary relating to themes of the play appeared in:

- The Spectator.
- UnHerd.

The 2025 production was nominated for an Off West End Award. In June 2026 a UK tour was announced. The production was scheduled to return to the King's Head Theatre from 1 to 10 October 2026, then open at Richmond Theatre on 13 October and visit the Oxford Playhouse, Cambridge Arts Theatre and the Minerva Theatre, Chichester, before closing at the Yvonne Arnaud Theatre, Guildford, on 21 November 2026. Kirsty Patrick Ward again directs, with Alan Cox, Hywel Morgan and Colin Tierney reprising their roles as Tony Crosland, Roy Jenkins and Denis Healey.

=== In the Print (2026) ===
In the Print is a play about the 1986 Wapping dispute. It centres on the conflict between Rupert Murdoch and Brenda Dean, general secretary of the Society of Graphical and Allied Trades (SOGAT) and the first woman to lead a major British trade union. The production was announced in October 2025. It was produced by The Spontaneity Shop and James Quaife Productions, directed by Josh Roche, and ran at the King's Head Theatre from 26 March to 3 May 2026. Alan Cox played Murdoch and Claudia Jolly played Dean, with Alasdair Harvey, Georgia Landers, Jonathan Jaynes and Russell Bentley in supporting roles.

In a four-star review in The Guardian, Mark Lawson described the play as a tense thriller. In a four-star review in The Stage, Holly O'Mahony wrote that the play "redrafts a hushed-up chapter" of history, and praised the urgency with which it explored the dispute. Libby Purves described it as "sharp, well-researched" and gripping, and said it felt true to the period and its people. The Reviews Hub called it "fascinating, timely, and impeccably put together". British Theatre Guide described it as "slick, tightly constructed" and entertaining.

In The Spectator, Lloyd Evans praised Jolly's performance and called the play essential for students of politics. However, he argued that the script did not examine Dean's own conduct critically. BroadwayWorld's reviewer argued that the play worked better as history than as drama, because it struggled to build tension around a known outcome. Kelvin MacKenzie, the former editor of The Sun, who is portrayed in the play, reviewed it in his Spectator diary. He judged it the better of two recent plays that depicted him. He also suggested that with more drama and less documentary it could transfer to the West End.

== Audio drama ==
Khan and Salinsky have written audio dramas for Big Finish Productions, including:

- The Ravelli Conspiracy
- Entanglement
- Churchill Victorious
- Kingdom of Lies
- World’s Beyond

== Selected works ==
Year	Title	Type	Venue / Publisher	Notes
2012	Coalition	Stage play	Pleasance Dome	Edinburgh Festival Fringe
2013	Making News	Stage play	Pleasance One	Edinburgh Festival Fringe
2014–15	Kingmaker	Stage play	Pleasance / St James Theatre / Arts Theatre	Political satire
2015	Impossible	Stage play	Pleasance Dome	Edinburgh Festival Fringe
2018	Brexit	Stage play	Pleasance Beyond / King’s Head Theatre	Published by Oberon
2025	The Gang of Three	Stage play	King’s Head Theatre	National tour commences 1 October 2026
2026	In the Print	Stage play	King’s Head Theatre	The Spontaneity Shop and James Quaife Productions; directed by Josh Roche
