= The Improverts =

Improvisation comedy troupe from the Edinburgh University Theatre Company

Improverts publicity for the fringe 2012

The Improverts is an improvisational comedy troupe from the Edinburgh University Theatre Company, which primarily performs at the Bedlam Theatre, Edinburgh. They perform weekly during Edinburgh University's term time and every night during the Edinburgh Festival Fringe.

== History ==
The Edinburgh University Theatre Company's improvised comedy troupe now known as The Improverts was founded in Edinburgh in 1989 by Canadian-born Toph Marshall. He named it Theatresports after the form of competitive improvisation developed by director Keith Johnstone in Calgary, Alberta, Canada in 1976. As the show grew in popularity the name was changed, during the Edinburgh Festival Fringe, (for copyright reasons) to Impro-Vegetables and then finally, in the 90s, to The Improverts. The Improverts was adopted as a permanent, year-round name from September 1997 onwards.

Since the show's inception it has kept the Bedlam Theatre as its primary performance space, running weekly during Edinburgh University's term time and then at the Edinburgh Fringe. Each year new players are recruited largely, though not exclusively, from the student population though every player must be a member of the Edinburgh University Theatre Company. The troupe provides free weekly workshops in improvisation for the general public in order to attract new talent to the group.

Carrying on the teachings of Keith Johnstone, the show's format has changed over time, but stayed within the short-form sketch mould similar to TV's Whose Line is it Anyway?.

== Current activities ==
During term time, the Improverts play weekly at Bedlam Theatre, and hold weekly free improvisation workshops for the general public.

== Notable alumni of the Improverts ==
- Maria Bamford (Arrested Development, The Comedians of Comedy)
- Mitch Benn (The Now Show, Mitch Benn's Crimes Against Music)
- Jenny Colgan (Amanda's Wedding, Looking for Andrew McCarthy, West End Girls)
- Mark Dolan (Balls of Steel)
- Miles Jupp (Rev, Miles Jupp's Real World)
- Humphrey Ker (The Brothers Faversham, Fast and Loose)
- Lucy Kirkwood (Chimerica, Tinderbox)
- Ewen MacIntosh (The Office)
- Kevin McKidd (Trainspotting, Dog Soldiers, Rome, Grey's Anatomy)
- David Reed (The Brothers Faversham, It's Kevin)
- Al Smith (Enola, The Cut)
- Lorna Rose Treen (SNL UK, Time of the Week)
- Thom Tuck (The Brothers Faversham)
