= Edinburgh University Theatre Company =

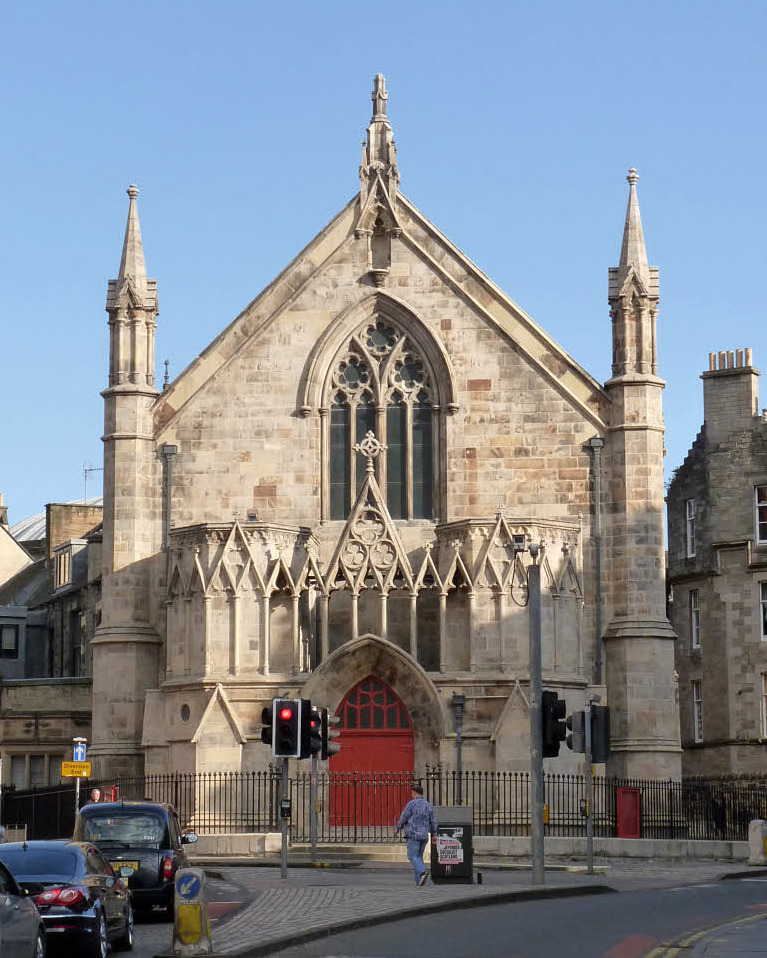
- The Bedlam Theatre is the EUTC's home
- Formation: March 8, 1871
- Type: Theatre group
- Purpose: Amateur Theatre
- Location: Bedlam Theatre
- Website: www.bedlamtheatre.co.uk
- Formerly called: Edinburgh University Drama Society (1939–1973)

Edinburgh University Theatre Company (EUTC) is a student theatre company at the University of Edinburgh. The EUTC was founded in 1871 as the Edinburgh University Amateur Dramatic Club and adopted its current name in the 1970s. Since 1980 it has run the Bedlam Theatre.

== History ==
EUTC was founded in 1871 as the Edinburgh University Amateur Dramatic Club. It adopted its current name in the 1970s. The EUTC were given sole residency of the Bedlam Theatre building on 31 January 1980.

The EUTC is one of several amateur dramatics societies affiliated to the Edinburgh University Students' Association. The EUTC is responsible (through a Committee elected at the company's AGM) for most aspects the theatre's administration and produces the vast majority of its shows.

Most members of the EUTC are students or former students of the University of Edinburgh. Shows are proposed to the EUTC at a General Meeting, where they are selected by a general vote. All show proposals must have, at the very least, a director, producer (organisation, finances and publicity), technician (lighting, sound and special effects) and stage manager or set manager (set building, props and costumes). Once a show is selected, it will be fully supported by the EUTC, who also provide a block grant depending on the show's classification.

The company stages a show most weeks during term time. The standard schedule consists of Teatimes, which are smaller-budget shows with one or two performances, Mainterms, larger-budget shows with at least three performances and Festivals, usually week-long events which require larger teams. These can be supplemented with Supplementary Shows, performances which do not fit easily into any of the previous categories. The first festival takes place in Welcome Week as a means to recruit new students.

The EUTC used to run the Bedlam Youth Project, which aimed to introduce children to the various disciplines of theatre. In 2016, children were involved in a week long Easter camp at Bedlam Theatre, where they devised and performed their interpretation of The Jungle Book, with the assistance of the Youth Project Team.

== The Improverts ==
Bedlam's longest running show is the acclaimed improvised comedy troupe The Improverts. They perform every year at the Edinburgh Festival Fringe and every Friday night at 10:30 during termtime. They are Edinburgh's longest-running improv troupe.

== Edinburgh Festival Fringe ==
Bedlam Theatre has operated as Venue 49 in the Edinburgh Festival Fringe since it was given to the EUTC in 1980. Today, from early June until termtime resumes in early September, the building is run by Bedlam Fringe, a separate organisation under the Edinburgh University Students' Association (EUSA) . Bedlam Fringe is typically run by a Production Manager and a Venue Manager, the latter of which — for historical and liaison reasons — is technically a member of the termtime EUTC Committee. However, they and other members of the senior management team are technically volunteers who report to EUSA and receive a EUSA honorarium rather than a wage. Other Bedlam Fringe staff are EUSA employees.

Bedlam Fringe must allocate at least two slots to productions selected by the EUTC, with one typically reserved for the The Improverts.

== Alumni ==
Friends of Bedlam is the alumni association for the EUTC and its predecessors. Well known alumni include:

- Ian Charleson (Chariots of Fire)
- Rawdon Christie
- Sir Michael Boyd (Royal Shakespeare Company)
- Alastair Sim (Scrooge)
- Daisy Donovan (The Eleven O'Clock Show)
- Rachael Stirling (Tipping the Velvet)
- Elize du Toit (Hollyoaks)
- Greg Wise (Sense and Sensibility)
- Hamish Clark (Monarch of the Glen)
- Sam Holcroft (Cockroach, Edgar and Annabel)
- Ella Hickson (Eight)
- Maria Bamford (The Comedians of Comedy)
- Mitch Benn (The Now Show, Mitch Benn's Crimes Against Music)
- Jenny Colgan (Amanda's Wedding, Looking for Andrew McCarthy, West End Girls)
- Steve Morrison (Edinburgh University Rector)
- Darius Campbell (also known as Darius Danesh, Popstars (British TV series), Chicago (West End), From Here to Eternity the Musical)
- Ewen MacIntosh (The Office (UK))
- Mark Dolan (Balls of Steel)
- Miles Jupp (Balamory, Miles Jupp's Real World, The News Quiz)
- Humphrey Ker (The Brothers Faversham, Fast and Loose)
- Lucy Kirkwood (Geronimo, Tinderbox, Chimerica)
- Kevin McKidd (Trainspotting, Grey's Anatomy, Rome)
- David Reed (The Brothers Faversham, Fast and Loose)
- Al Smith (Enola, Radio)
- Thom Tuck (The Brothers Faversham)
- Duncan McLean
- Peter Forbes
- David Rintoul
- Hilton McRae
- Eleanor Rhode
- Jack Ronder
- Amber Rudd
- Angus Wright
