= Daddy Issues (TV series) =

2024 British television series

- Genre: Comedy
- Created by: Danielle Ward
- Written by: Danielle Ward; David Reed
- Directed by: Catherine Morshead; Damon Beesley; Danielle Ward
- Starring: Aimee Lou Wood; David Morrissey
- Theme music composer: James Righton
- Country of origin: United Kingdom
- Original language: English
- No. of series: 2
- No. of episodes: 12

Production
- Executive producers: Phil Gilbert; Aimee Lou Wood; David Morrissey; Danielle Ward; Damon Beesley
- Producer: Lynn Roberts
- Production company: Fudge Park Productions

Original release
- Network: BBC Three
- Release: 15 August 2024 – present

Daddy Issues is a British comedy television series created by Danielle Ward that premiered on 15 August 2024 on BBC Three. It stars Aimee Lou Wood and David Morrissey in the lead roles.

In September 2024, the BBC commissioned a second series which premiered on 21 November 2025. In July 2026, the BBC commissioned a third and final series.

== Premise ==
An odd-couple sitcom in which a pregnant party girl and her recently divorced father end up in a flat-share in Stockport.

== Cast and characters ==
=== Main ===
- Aimee Lou Wood as Gemma
- David Morrissey as Malcolm

=== Supporting ===
- Susan Lynch (series 1) and Jill Halfpenny (series 2) as Davina
- David Fynn as Derek
- Sharon Rooney as Catherine
- Sarah Hadland as Rita
- Taj Atwal as Cherry
- Arian Nik as Xander
- Tom Stourton as Ben
- Susannah Fielding as Allegra
- Lauren O'Rourke as Twinky
- Cyril Nri as Stuart
- Cora Kirk as Tamika
- Perry Fitzpatrick as Tyrone
- Claire Keelan as Jess
- Damien Molony as Fergal
- Sherrie Hewson as Agnes
- Humphrey Ker as Warren
- David Reed as Craig
- Philip Jackson as Jackie (series 2)

== Series overview ==
Series	Episodes	Originally released
1	6	15 August 2024
2	6	21 November 2025

== Episodes ==
=== Series 1 (2024) ===
No. overall	No. in series	Title	Directed by	Written by	Original release date
1	1	"Happy Tears"	Catherine Morshead	Danielle Ward	15 August 2024
2	2	"Normal Men"	Damon Beesley	Danielle Ward	15 August 2024
3	3	"Sugar Daddies"	Damon Beesley	Danielle Ward	15 August 2024
4	4	"Garden Sliders"	Damon Beesley	Danielle Ward	15 August 2024
5	5	"Man Mess"	Damon Beesley	Danielle Ward	15 August 2024
6	6	"Sadie"	Damon Beesley	Danielle Ward	15 August 2024

=== Series 2 (2025) ===
No. overall	No. in series	Title	Directed by	Written by	Original release date
7	1	"Back for Good"	Danielle Ward	Danielle Ward	21 November 2025
8	2	"Pine Come and Litter"	Damon Beesley	Danielle Ward	21 November 2025
9	3	"It's a Plum"	Damon Beesley	Danielle Ward	21 November 2025
10	4	"We Don't Like Sigmas"	Damon Beesley	Danielle Ward	21 November 2025
11	5	"I'm Your Man"	Damon Beesley	Danielle Ward	21 November 2025
12	6	"For Future Reference, Trousers Stay"	Damon Beesley	Danielle Ward & David Reed	21 November 2025

== Production ==
The six-part first series was written by comedian and writer Danielle Ward, directed by Damon Beesley and Caterine Morshead, produced by Lynn Roberts, with Phil Gilbert as executive producer for Fudge Park Productions. Stars Aimee Lou Wood and David Morrissey also acted as executive producers. A second series was commissioned in September 2024, with Ward returning to write. A third and final series was commissioned in July 2026.

=== Casting ===
Aimee Lou Wood and David Morrissey star in the lead roles of Gemma and Malcolm, with both returning for the second series. Additional cast members include David Fynn, Sharon Rooney, Sarah Hadland, Taj Atwal, Arian Nik, Tom Stourton, Susan Lynch, Susannah Fielding, Lauren O'Rourke, Cyril Nri, Cora Kirk, Perry Fitzpatrick, Claire Keelan, Damien Molony, Sherrie Hewson, Humphrey Ker, and David Reed.

=== Filming ===
Filming for the first series began in Stockport and Manchester in December 2023. Filming for the second series started in January 2025.

== Broadcast ==
The first series premiered on 15 August 2024 on BBC Three. The second series premiered on 21 November 2025 on BBC One.

== Reception ==
Jasper Rees in The Daily Telegraph called the series "deft, daft, and deliciously watchable". Emma Loffhagen in The Evening Standard called it "believable and heartwarming” and praised the “brilliantly acerbic” script from Danielle Ward and the chemistry between Morrissey and his screen daughter Aimee Lou Wood. In The Independent, Katie Rosseinsky called it "a warm hug of a show". Lucy Mangan in The Guardian called it "a comedy for our times", praising Ward's script and the chemistry of the leads, describing Morrissey as having the "ability to make anything and anyone credible" which "carries him through proceedings with aplomb".

=== Accolades ===
The series was nominated for Best New TV Sitcom at the Comedy.co.uk Awards in January 2025. Aimee Lou Wood was nominated for Best Comedy Performance at the Royal Television Society Programme Awards in March 2025.
