= Thom Tuck =

British actor and comedian (born 1982)

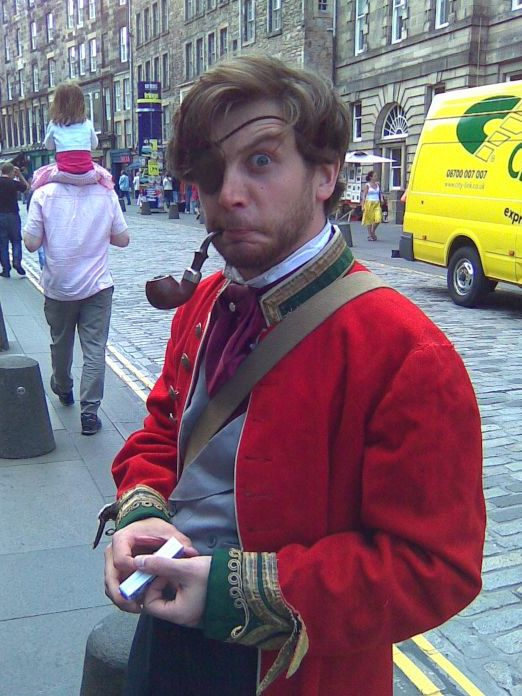
- Tuck in 2008
- Born: Thomas Tuck; 28 March 1982 (age 44); Leeds, West Yorkshire, England
- Notable work: The Penny Dreadfuls

Comedy career
- Years active: 2006–present
- Medium: Stand up, radio, television
- Genre: Sketch comedy

Thomas Tuck (born 28 March 1982) is a British actor and comedian. He is known for being one third of comedy troupe The Penny Dreadfuls and as a stand-up comedian. He was nominated for the Best Newcomer award at the 2011 Edinburgh Festival Fringe.

== Early life ==
Tuck attended the American International School of Dhaka in Bangladesh and Cardinal Heenan Roman Catholic High School and Notre Dame Sixth Form College in Leeds. As a child, he also lived in Sri Lanka, Denmark, Egypt, Malawi, Zimbabwe and the Philippines. He studied philosophy at the University of Edinburgh and graduated with a 2:2. While at university, he performed with the Edinburgh University Theatre Company; acting in, writing and directing plays, including directing a piece written by playwright Sam Holcroft, and was a member of acclaimed improvisational comedy troupe The Improverts. It was with The Improverts that he first met and performed with fellow comedians Humphrey Ker and David Reed.

== Career ==
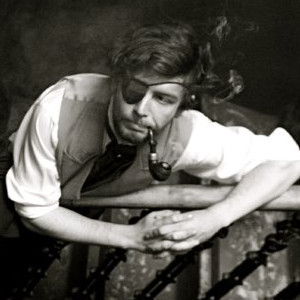
Photo shoot from 2008

Tuck's radio work includes The Penny Dreadfuls Present... alongside David Reed and Humphrey Ker, and the BBC Radio 4 series Thom Tuck Goes Straight-to-DVD.

With The Penny Dreadfuls, Tuck debuted at the Edinburgh Festival Fringe in 2006. The group created new sketch shows for the four years that follow. In addition they created a radio series for BBC Radio 4 called The Brothers Faversham, which aired in 2008. A sequel series aired that same year, and for most years that followed The Penny Dreadfuls have performed a historical comedy play.

In 2011 BBC Radio 4 commissioned Thom Tuck Goes Straight To DVD, a comedy show adapted from his Edinburgh show that year. The pilot aired in February 2012, and a full series of four episodes began to air in April 2013.

His television credits include BBC Three's Comedy Shuffle, The Wrong Door, The Supersizers..., Dick and Dom's Funny Business and Mongrels.

He hosts and curates The Alternative Comedy Memorial Society with John-Luke Roberts at the New Red Lion Theatre in Islington.

Tuck has also ventured into the world of video game acting. In 2014 he took on the role of voicing Kablooey, a well dressed peacock and peggle master in the Popcap game Peggle Blast.

=== Theatre ===
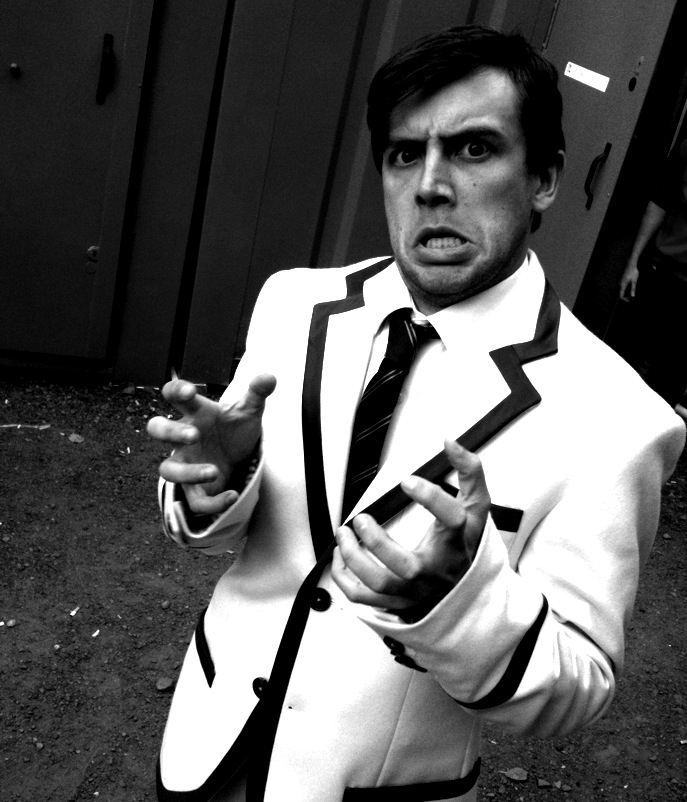
Tuck in 2009

1999 Edinburgh Festival Fringe

- West Side Story, winner of Herald Angel Award.

NSDF 2003

- Like Skinnydipping by Chris Perkin

2005 Edinburgh Festival Fringe & NSDF 2005

- Scaramouche Jones by Justin Butcher

2006 Edinburgh Festival Fringe

- Aeneas Faversham with The Penny Dreadfuls
- Geronimo by Lucy Kirkwood, winner of ThreeWeeks Editors' Award.

2007 Edinburgh Festival Fringe

- Aeneas Faversham Returns with The Penny Dreadfuls, winner of ThreeWeeks Editors' Award.

2008 Edinburgh Festival Fringe

- Aeneas Faversham Forever with The Penny Dreadfuls

2009 National Tour

- Totally Looped

2009 Edinburgh Festival Fringe

- The Never Man with The Penny Dreadfuls
- The Hotel by Mark Watson

2010 Edinburgh Festival Fringe

- Penny Dreadfuls 2010 with The Penny Dreadfuls
- Gutted: A Revenger's Musical by Danielle Ward & Martin White

2011 Edinburgh Festival Fringe

- Thom Tuck Goes Straight-to-DVD
- Directed Bad Mother by Meryl O'Rourke

2012 Edinburgh Festival Fringe

- Thom Tuck Flips Out

2013 Pleasance Theatre, London

- Coalition written by Khan and Salinsky

2016 Edinburgh Festival Fringe

- Thom Tuck: An August Institution

2018 King's Head Theatre, Islington

- Brexit written by Khan and Salinsky

2022 Edinburgh Festival Fringe

- Thom Tuck and Tim FitzHigham: Macbeth
