= Do the Right Thing (podcast) =

Comedy podcast

- Genre: Comedy

Cast and voices
- Hosted by: Danielle Ward
- Starring: Michael Legge, Margaret Cabourn-Smith

Production
- Production: Ben Walker

Publication
- No. of episodes: 53
- Original release: 2 August 2011 – 22 December 2019

Reception
- Ratings: 5/5

Related
- Website: Official website

Do the Right Thing was a British comedy panel show podcast featuring host Danielle Ward, and team captains Michael Legge and Margaret Cabourn-Smith. The show was produced by Ben Walker. The show consisted of seven series and four specials. The final episode was the 2019 Christmas special. Danielle Ward confirmed that the show would not be returning after the COVID-19 pandemic, as she had retired from live performance.

== Format ==
Two teams of two comedians compete to "do the right thing in any situation". Each show comprises four rounds:

- The Importance of Being Right
- Agony
- Ask the Expert
- Do the Wrong Thing

== Other media ==
A TV pilot episode, hosted by Claudia Winkleman, was recorded by Channel 4 in 2016.

== Awards ==
- Bronze, Best Internet Programme, Sony Radio Academy Awards, 2012.
