= Celeste Dring =

English actress and writer

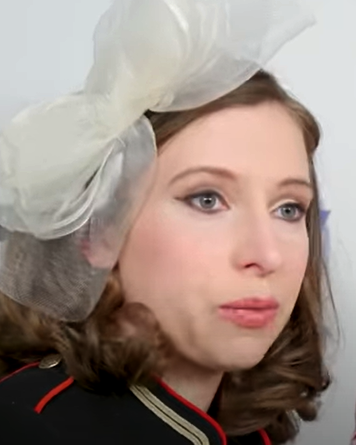
- Celeste Dring as Princess Eugenie in 2017
- Born: 10 April 1989 (age 37); Wolverhampton, England
- Occupation: Actor
- Years active: 2015–present

Celeste Dring (born 10 April 1989) is an English comedy writer and actress, and a current cast member of Saturday Night Live UK. She is also known for her roles as Lauren Richards in the BBC TV series Wanderlust and as Princess Eugenie in Channel 4's The Windsors.

== Early life ==
Celeste Dring is from Wolverhampton. She attended Hurtwood House, a boarding school in Surrey. She then studied English at the University of Cambridge and graduated in July 2010. Dring started her career as a dance director at the Central Youth Theatre, Wolverhampton.

== Comedy career ==
Dring started working with Freya Parker and Ed Kiely in the fringe theatre trio Lebensmüde. The trio performed at the 2013 Edinburgh Festival. After Kiely left, Dring and Parker continued as a duo under the name Lazy Susan, earning a nomination for the comedy newcomer award at the 2014 Edinburgh Festival Fringe. In 2016, Dring landed a main role as Princess Eugenie in Channel 4's The Windsors alongside actress Ellie White, who plays her royal sister Princess Beatrice. Dring has stated that she based her character on the stars of Made in Chelsea rather than the real-life Princess Eugenie.

Dring appeared as Kayleigh Hudson, a regular character in the BBC3 comedy series This Country in 2018. She also appeared as Laura in BBC's Wanderlust the same year.

As a voice actor Dring had a speaking role in BBC Radio 4's Sketchorama (2015) and Newsjack (2017).

In 2022 she appeared in a reboot of Lazy Susan on BBC Three for four 14-minute episodes.

In February 2026, Dring was announced as part of the Saturday Night Live UK cast. She has portrayed Housing Secretary Angela Rayner.

== Filmography ==
=== Film ===
Year	Title	Role	Notes
2015	Smell Investigators	Pete Lazarus	short film
2021	Last Night in Soho	Shop Assistant	
2022	Cyrano	Theatre lady	Uncredited

=== Television ===
Year	Title	Role	Notes
2015	Josh	Lily	1 episode
2015	SunTrap	Barmaid Zorro	1 episode
2016	Morgana Robinson's The Agency	Sauce Scientist	2 episodes
2016	Year Friends	Suzie the chef	1 episode
2018	Wanderlust	Laura Richards	5 episodes
2019	Down from London	Cam	1 episode
2019	Ladhood	Penelope	1 episode
2019	Lazy Susan	various characters	Pilot
2019	Absentia	Liza Tutee	1 episode
2017–2020	This Country	Kayleigh Hudson	4 episodes
2016–2020	The Windsors	Princess Eugenie	20 episodes
2021	The Green & Pleasant Guide	Presenter	4 episodes
2022	Lazy Susan	various characters	4 episodes
2022	The Witchfinder	Goodwife Griffin	1 episode
2026	Saturday Night Live UK	various	

=== Radio ===
Year	Title	Role	Notes
2015	Sketchorama	Lazy Susan	BBC Radio 4
2017	Newsjack	herself	BBC Radio 4
2020	The Sink: A Sleep Aid	various	BBC Sounds
