= Ewen MacIntosh =

Welsh actor (1973–2024)

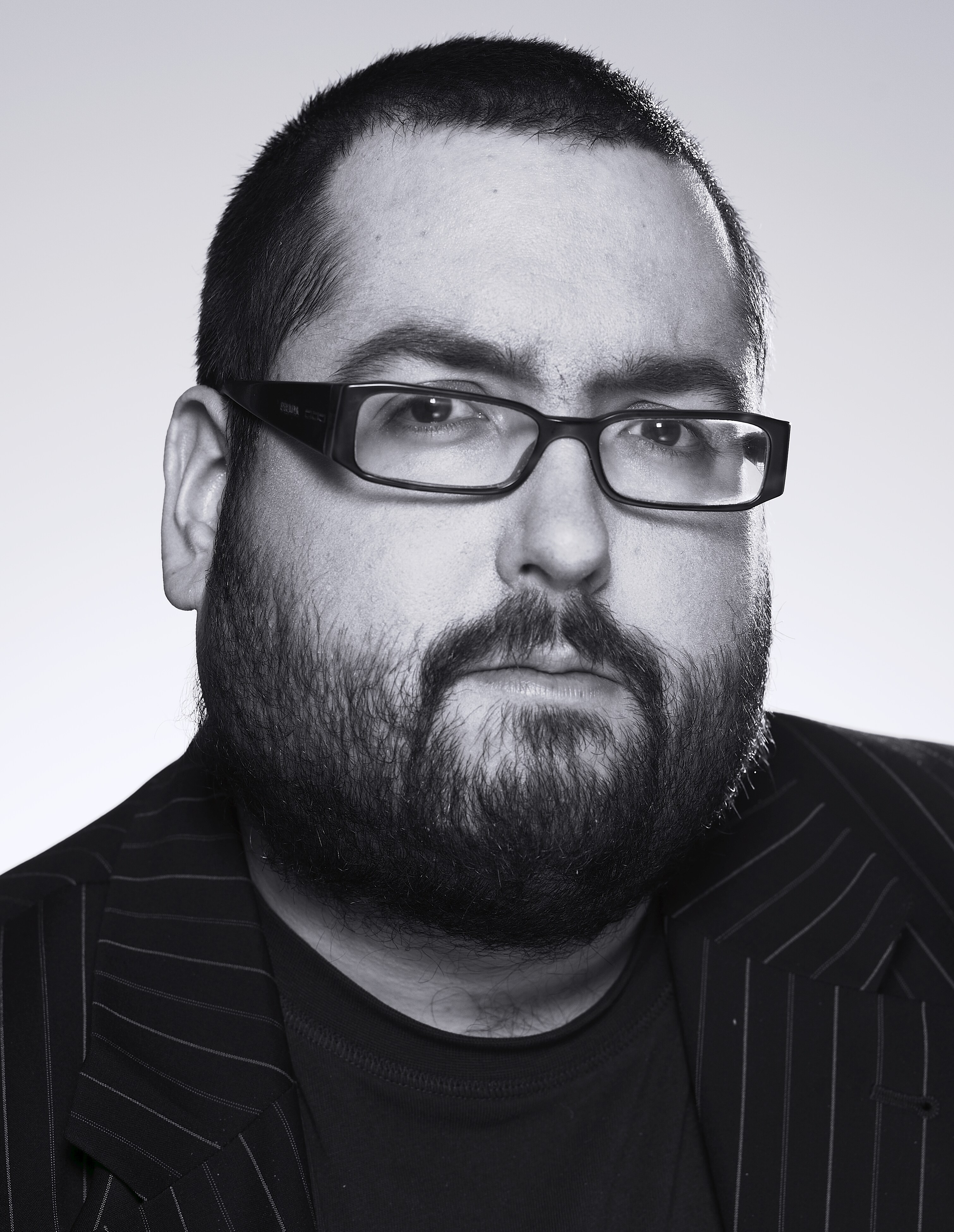
- Born: Ewen Douglas MacIntosh; 25 December 1973; Merionethshire, Wales
- Died: 19 February 2024 (aged 50); Darlington, England
- Occupation: Actor

Ewen Douglas MacIntosh (25 December 1973 – 19 February 2024) was a Welsh actor known for his role as Keith Bishop in The Office (2001–2003).

== Early life ==
MacIntosh was born in Merionethshire, Wales, on 25 December 1973. He was educated at Repton School in Derbyshire, and studied linguistics at the University of Edinburgh. While at university, he was involved in the Edinburgh University Theatre Company and The Improverts.

== Career ==
MacIntosh's big break in television came when he was cast as deadpan accountant Keith Bishop in The Office. He also appeared on various shows such as a 2009 episode of Miranda and Little Britain. He formed a double act with Tim FitzHigham and they performed at the Edinburgh Festival Fringe in 2007. In 2009, he appeared alongside several other celebrities in a charity music video for the Chris Rea song "Driving Home for Christmas".

In April 2013, MacIntosh performed in the West End show Geek! A New Musical at the Tristan Bates Theatre. He was a regular on the radio sitcom Cabin Pressure as Carl, a bored air traffic controller. In 2013, he appeared in a national TV advert for AO World.

MacIntosh appeared as Barry the window-cleaner in the 2014 film The Confusion of Tongues, and in 2015, had a role in The Lobster, directed by Yorgos Lanthimos. Again in 2015, he made a cameo appearance in the music video for Wolf Alice's "Giant Peach". In 2017, he appeared as Lionel in British romantic comedy film Finding Fatimah. In 2019 he appeared in the Shaun of The Dead-echoing zombie film Shed of The Dead alongside Emily Booth.

MacIntosh appeared on week two (Cheshire) of Celebrity Come Dine with Me in 2020, alongside Charlotte Crosby, Dawn Ward, Steven Arnold and Jay Hutton.

MacIntosh also presented various music programmes on Now 80s and Now 90s.

In 2021, MacIntosh appeared as a doctor in the feature film South Of The River (aka Live Fast, Live Free). In 2022 he made a cameo appearance in the third and final series of After Life. The same year, he made an appearance in an episode of Unfinished London by Jay Foreman on YouTube as "Robert P McCulloch".

== Death ==
MacIntosh died at a care home in Darlington on 19 February 2024, at the age of 50; he had experienced two years of ill health prior to his death.
