= Father Figure (TV series) =

British television series

- Genre: Sitcom
- Written by: Jason Byrne
- Directed by: Nick Wood
- Theme music composer: Mcasso
- Country of origin: United Kingdom
- Original language: English
- No. of series: 1
- No. of episodes: 6 (list of episodes)

Production
- Executive producer: Stephen McCrum
- Producer: Julia McKenzie
- Production location: Hertfordshire
- Editor: Mark Lawrence
- Running time: 30 minutes
- Production company: BBC Production

Original release
- Network: BBC One; BBC One HD
- Release: 18 September – 23 October 2013

Father Figure is a British television sitcom that was first broadcast on BBC One on 18 September 2013. In Ireland the series first aired on RTÉ Two in September 2013. The six-part series was written by Jason Byrne and directed by Nick Wood.

== Cast ==
- Jason Byrne as Tom Whyte
- Karen Taylor as Elaine Whyte
- Pauline McLynn as Mary Whyte
- Dermot Crowley as Pat Whyte
- Michael Smiley as Roddy
- Matthew Fenton as Dylan Whyte
- Alexander Aze as Drew Whyte
- David Reed as Brendan
- Margaret Cabourn-Smith as Helen
- Tim Downie as Tim Curtain
- Thom Collett as Quiet Joe

== Production ==
In June 2013, filming began on the comedy series at Elstree Studios and ended on 11 July 2013. The studio scenes were filmed in front of a studio audience.

== Episode list ==
No.	Title	Directed by	Written by	Original release date	Viewers (millions)
1	"The Apology"	Nick Wood	Jason Byrne	18 September 2013	1.37 (overnight)
2	"Smart TV"	Nick Wood	Jason Byrne	25 September 2013	1.59 (overnight)
Guest starring: David McNeill, Richard Aloi and Marcus Adolphy
3	"House Husband of the Year"	Nick Wood	Jason Byrne	2 October 2013	1.27 (overnight)
Guest starring: Simon Delaney, Chrissie Cotterill, Tayler Marshall, James Benson and Kevin Moore
4	"Chin Chin"	Nick Wood	Jason Byrne	9 October 2013	N/A
Guest starring: Peter Serafinowicz and Martin Collins
5	"I Do Believe"	Nick Wood	Jason Byrne	16 October 2013	N/A
Guest starring: Tayler Marshall, Sidney Johnston, John Burke and Tim Hudson
6	"Mother Figure"	Nick Wood	Jason Byrne	23 October 2013	N/A
Guest starring: Isy Suttie, Rosalyn Wright and Rosa-Marie Lewis

== Reception ==
=== Ratings ===
Overnight figures showed that the first episode was watched by 11.5% of the viewing audience of that time, with 1.37 million watching it. The second episode was watched by 12.3% of the viewing audience. The third episode was watched by 10.4% of the viewing audience.

=== Critical reception ===
The series received mostly negative reviews. Catherine Gee of The Daily Telegraph gave it one out of five stars and said: "All of it was implausible, but, that’s not really the point. We don’t need our comedy to be plausible. Peep Show was rarely plausible, neither was Blackadder, nor Red Dwarf, nor Fawlty Towers, but that didn’t stop them being funny. What we need is for these implausible situations to be delivered with wit, brilliant timing and a superbly funny script. Father Figure failed on every count." The Daily Express commented: "It gives me great pleasure to announce that the BBC has broadcast a "sitcom" which is worse than Big Top. ... At the outset, I should confess that I did laugh, just once, after which I continued to watch in horror".

Metro also disliked the series, giving it two out of five stars and commented: "Father Figure managed to commit every sitcom cliché crime in the book: dopey bloke, interfering mother, long-suffering wife, victim neighbours, bonkers relatives." The Scotsman said: "The show is relentlessly middle-of-the-road, determinedly populist and wholly idiotic. Were it not for the sweary-words and a few double entendres, it would be pitched firmly as family entertainment and has clearly been commissioned to try to cash in on the unexpected success of Mrs Brown's Boys." The Irish Independent said: "This was unabashed slapstick stuff and none the worse for that, but Byrne, who created and scripted the show, had no other ideas up his sleeve and within minutes the action had degenerated into a succession of increasingly frantic pratfalls and custard-pie gags, each of them less amusing than the one that had gone before."

The Glasgow Herald was more positive, saying: "Showing a silly, childish and almost entirely innocent sitcom like Father Figure (BBC One, Wednesday, 11.35pm) so late at night is weird. ... Father Figure is not bad. It's very not bad. In fact, if you're a fan of silent comedy, it's rather good. Indeed, much of the first episode is so reminiscent of silent comedy routines that Jason Byrne might have created a new genre: silent comedy with sound."

== Home media ==
The series was released on DVD in the UK on 28 October 2013.
