= Isy Suttie =

British comedian and actress (born 1978)

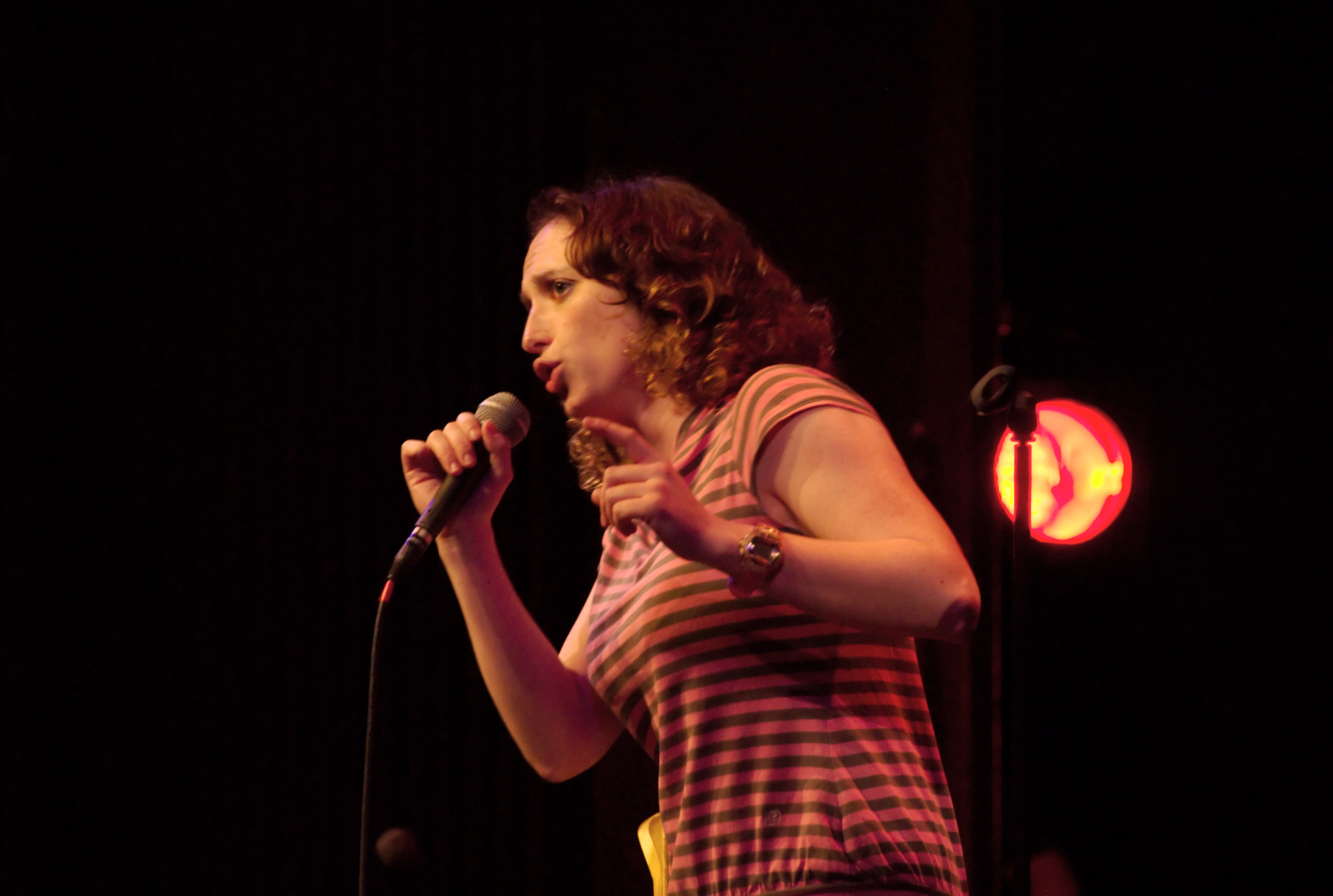
- Suttie performing in 2007
- Born: Isobel Jane Suttie; 1977 or 1978 (age 48–49); Hull, England
- Education: Guildford School of Acting
- Years active: 2000–present
- Known for: Television, radio, theatre, stand-up
- Spouse: Elis James (m. 2024)
- Children: 2

Isobel Jane Suttie (/ˈɪziː ˈsʊtiː/; born 1977 or 1978) is a British musical comedian, actress and writer. She played Dobby in the Channel 4 sitcom Peep Show, and in 2013 won the gold Radio Academy Award for her radio show Pearl and Dave.

== Early life ==
Suttie was born in Hull to a Scottish father and English mother and brought up in Matlock, Derbyshire. Her mother is of Jewish heritage.

From an early age, she expressed a desire to act and write. She began playing the guitar and writing songs at the age of twelve after she was refused saxophone lessons. As a teenager she was a member of a progressive rock band called Infinite Drift. She attended Highfields School in Matlock.

== Career ==
=== Theatre, comedy and music ===
Suttie trained as an actress at the Guildford School of Acting, graduating in 2000. In 2001 she composed and directed a score for Peter Weiss' play Marat/Sade at the Arcola Theatre in London. Suttie began performing stand-up comedy in 2003. Her act normally consists of music, stand-up and stories, either as herself or under the guise of a character.

At the 2005 Edinburgh Fringe, Suttie was one of the acts in stand-up showcase The Comedy Zone. In 2006, she acted in Danielle Ward's Take-a-Break Tales at The Pleasance with Neil Edmond and Emma Fryer. In 2007, she performed her debut solo stand-up show, Love Lost in the British Retail Industry, which she took to Sydney Arts Festival and on a UK tour in 2010–11, and in 2008 her second solo Edinburgh show The Suttie Show. She played psycho killer Sorrow in the revival of Danielle Ward and Martin White's cult musical Gutted at the Leicester Square Theatre for two performances in February and March 2011. She took her third solo stand-up show, Pearl and Dave, to Edinburgh in August 2011. She appeared at the Just for Laughs Comedy Festival in Montreal in July 2012.

Suttie occasionally duets with folk musician Gavin Osborn and supported musician Jim Bob on tour in 2010. She also appeared with Jim Bob for the fourth year of the Nine Lessons and Carols for Godless People event at the Bloomsbury Theatre in December 2011.

Suttie was nominated for Best Female Newcomer at the 2008 British Comedy Awards, then Female Breakthrough Artist in 2011 and Best Female TV Comic in 2014. She was regional winner of The Daily Telegraph Young Jazz Competition (1995) for composition, winner of the Julian Slade Songwriting Competition (1998) and Chortle Awards best newcomer nominee (2005). In 2013, the BBC Radio 4 version of Pearl and Dave won a Gold Sony Radio Academy Award.

In November 2013, Suttie starred in Listen, We're Family, a vertabim theatre production commissioned by the JW3 cultural centre in London. Co-created by director Matthew Llyod and actor-writer Kerry Shale, the explored Jewish family life in London through recordings of interviews with members of the British Jewish community, which the actors reproduced on stage.

In February and March 2014, she starred as Phyllis Pearsall, the creator of the A–Z Street Atlas, in the musical The A–Z of Mrs P, which ran at Southwark Playhouse.

=== Television, radio, film and podcasts ===
Suttie's first television writing was for two series of the popular teenage drama Skins, under the guise of "comedy consultant".

Suttie appeared in the short film that accompanied the song "God of Loneliness" by Emmy The Great, alongside Shazad Latif, directed by Chris Boyle.

She provides the voices for BBC One's Walk on the Wild Side, in addition to voicing the character of Josie the Dog in Kristen Schaal and Kurt Braunohler's Penelope Princess of Pets (Channel 4 Comedy Lab). She provides voices for children's series The Revolting World of Stanley Brown. Suttie has also provided the voiceover for several TV commercials.

Suttie has previously appeared as a special guest on the popular podcast, Answer Me This!, in April 2013 alongside hosts Helen Zaltzman and Olly Mann.

Suttie played a waitress called Kiki alongside Alan Davies in BBC Two's Whites, which aired in autumn 2010. She has also made TV appearances in Holby City, as Mary Shelley in The Trouble With Love (BBC Two), as various characters in The Incredible Will and Greg (Channel 4), as Lianne in Rab C. Nesbitt (BBC), as a judge in Genie in the House and as a nurse in two episodes of Skins (Channel 4).

She played the regular character Esther Blanco in the last series of Shameless, broadcast in 2013. In January 2013, she appeared in the ITV comedy drama series Great Night Out as Bev.

She was cast as Dobby, IT geek and love interest of David Mitchell's character Mark Corrigan in Peep Show in 2008, a role that she continued to play for the remainder of the show's run until 2015.

Suttie has written and appeared in many shows on BBC radio, including her own BBC Radio 4 series, Isy Suttie's Love Letters, which began in 2013. She is also a regular presenter of The Comedy Club on BBC Radio 4 Extra and has acted in two of Tim Key's radio shows.

She has been on the UK team for the monthly podcast "International Waters", hosted by Jesse Thorn of maximumfun.org. She appeared on episode 2 at the end of March 2012, alongside Dan Antopolski.

In 2012, Suttie voice-acted in the CBeebies show The Cow that Almost Missed Christmas alongside Johnny Vegas. The show was a one-off animation which gave a unique interpretation of the Christmas Nativity seen through the eyes of a cow called Marjorie, whom Suttie voiced.

In August 2013, Suttie appeared in the one-off revival episode of the television series Knightmare as Treguard's assistant Veruca/Daisy. The 26-minute episode was aired as part of YouTube's "Geek Week" celebrations.

In March 2014 Suttie appeared in the S4C Welsh learners programme Hwb as a Welsh learner (which she is in real life) in a regular sketch called "Y Wers Gymraeg" ("The Welsh Lesson"), starring her partner Elis James.

In 2014, she wrote and starred in a short film, The Best Night of Roxy's Life, alongside Philip Jackson and JJ Burnel of The Stranglers. The film tells the story of Roxy, a Stranglers superfan who meets JJ, her hero.

In September 2016, she began a six-episode run on the Channel 4 TV show Damned as Natalie, a temporary receptionist. She returned for the second series in 2018. She also appeared in the sitcom Man Down as Miss Clarke and has provided narration on the show Posh Pawn.

In November 2019, Suttie provided narration for Jewish Britain on Film, a documentary directed by Jon Spira which explores historical scenes of 20th-century Jewish life in iconic British location such as London's East End, and Petticcoat Lane, through archival film footage.

In December 2025, Suttie featured as a guest star, alongside four other members of the Peep Show cast, on Channel 4's The Great British Bake Off Christmas edition. In the autumn of 2026, she appeared as a contestant on the 22nd series of Taskmaster.

=== Author ===
In January 2016, her first book, The Actual One, was published by Orion. In July 2021, her first novel, Jane is Trying, was also published by Orion.

== Personal life ==
Suttie married her longtime partner, comedian Elis James, in August 2024. The couple have two children. After the birth of her daughter, she developed migraine-associated vertigo.

== Filmography ==
=== Film ===
Year	Film	Role	Notes	Ref.
2017	Pin Cushion	Anne		
2021	Invisible Manners	Voice role		
2023	Cottontail	Olivia - Hen Party		
2023	Wonka	Fruit & Veg Vendor		

=== Television ===
Year	Title	Character	Production	Notes
2008	Love Soup	Researcher	BBC One	Episode: "Green Widow"
2008	The Incredible Will and Greg	Various sketches	Channel 4	TV film
2008	Genie in the House	Audition Judge	Nickelodeon	Episode: "Look to the Future"
2008–2015	Peep Show	Dobby	Channel 4	Series 5–9
2009	Holby City	Nancy Colcano	BBC One	Episode: "The Honeymoon's Over"
2009–2013	Walk on the Wild Side	Various Voice Overs	BBC One (Series 1, 2), CBBC (Series 3)	Series 1, 2, and 3
2010	Whites	Kiki	BBC Two	6 episodes
2010	Penelope Princess of Pets	Josie the Dog	Channel 4	TV film
2011	Rab C. Nesbitt	Leanne Curruth	BBC Two	Episode: "Role"
2012	Skins	Nurse Pauline	Channel 4	2 episodes
2012	White Van Man	Tash	BBC Three	Episode: "They Think It's All Over"
2012	The Cow That Almost Missed Christmas	Marjorie (voice)	BBC Two	TV film
2012	The Revolting World of Stanley Brown	Animation Voice (voice)	CBBC	12 episodes
2013	Great Night Out	Bev	ITV	4 episodes
2013	Shameless	Esther Blanco	Channel 4	10 episodes
2013	Love Matters	Bella Wright	Sky Living	Episode: "Miss Wright"
2013	Would I Lie To You?	Herself	BBC One	Series 7, episode 2
2013	Never Mind the Buzzcocks	Herself	BBC Two	Series 27, episode 2
2013	QI	Herself	BBC Two	Series K, episode 8
2013	Father Figure		BBC One	Episode: "Mother Figure"
2013	Comedy Blaps ACMS Presents A Board Meeting	Isy, Vicky	Channel 4	Episodes 1–3
2014	Alan Davies: As Yet Untitled	Herself	Dave	Series 1, episode 4
2015–present	8 Out of 10 Cats Does Countdown	Herself	Channel 4	4 episodes
2016	Drunk History (British TV series)	Herself	Comedy Central	Season 2, episode 3
2016	Boomers	Suze	BBC One	Episode: "Naming Ceremony"
2016–2017	Man Down	Ally	Channel 4	10 episodes
2016–2018	Damned	Nat	Channel 4	12 episodes
2018	Zapped	Esme	Dave	Episode: "Amulet"
2021	Question Team	Herself (Guest Question Setter)	Dave	1 episode
2022	The Baby	Rita	HBO	3 episodes
2022	Murder, They Hope	Beatrice	U&Gold	1 episode
2023	Dreaming Whilst Black	Helen	BBC Three	3 episodes
2025	The Great Christmas Bake Off	Herself	Channel 4	Christmas special
2026	Taskmaster	Herself	Channel 4	Series 22

=== Radio ===
Year	Title	Character	Production	Notes
2013	Isy Suttie's Love Letters	Herself	BBC Radio 4	Series 1, 4 episodes
2014	Isy Suttie's Love Letters	Herself	BBC Radio 4	Series 2, 5 episodes

== Discography ==
=== The A–Z of Mrs P Original London Cast ===
Album	Release date	Label	Notes
The A–Z of Mrs P	24 March 2014	SimG Productions	Suttie sings in the role of Phyllis Pearsall
