= Margaret Cabourn-Smith =

English comedy actress

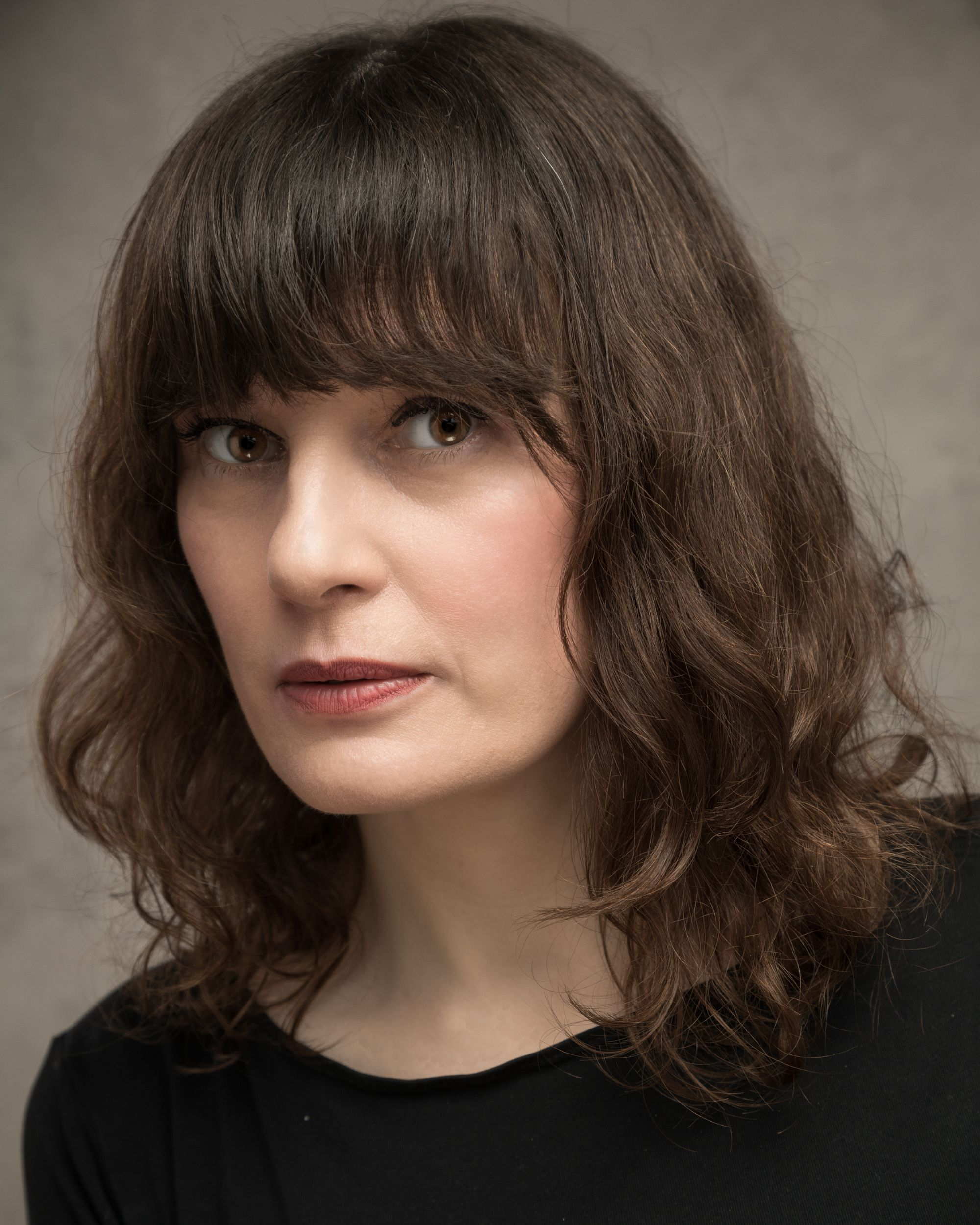
- Born: 1975 (age 50–51); Richmond upon Thames, England
- Occupation: Actress

Margaret Alice Cabourn-Smith (born 1975) is an English comedy actress and podcaster with appearances on Catastrophe, The IT Crowd, Psychoville, Peep Show, Fresh Meat, Motherland, Daddy Issues and Cheaters.

Her TV work includes playing regular characters on Miranda, Katy Brand's Big Ass Show, Lab Rats, In and Out of The Kitchen and Father Figure.

She played Crimson in Disney Channel's The Evermoor Chronicles.

Her radio work includes many of The Penny Dreadfuls' plays, John Finnemore's Souvenir Programme, The Now Show, Sarah Millican's Support Group, The Maltby Collection, Bigipedia, Newsjack, Dilemma, Another Case of Milton Jones, Life in London, The Headset Set and 1966 and All That. She was also one of the team captains on the comedy podcast Do The Right Thing.

Stage work includes Di & Viv & Rose at the Stephen Joseph Theatre, Scarborough, Spike (Watermill Theatre and national tour), Angus, Thongs & Even More Snogging (West Yorkshire Playhouse 2012) and Gutted (Assembly Rooms, 2010)

She writes for online magazine Standard Issue. She is married to comedy writer and actor Dan Tetsell.

In July 2021, she appeared as Leyla in BBC Radio 4's The Archers.

== Crushed Podcast ==
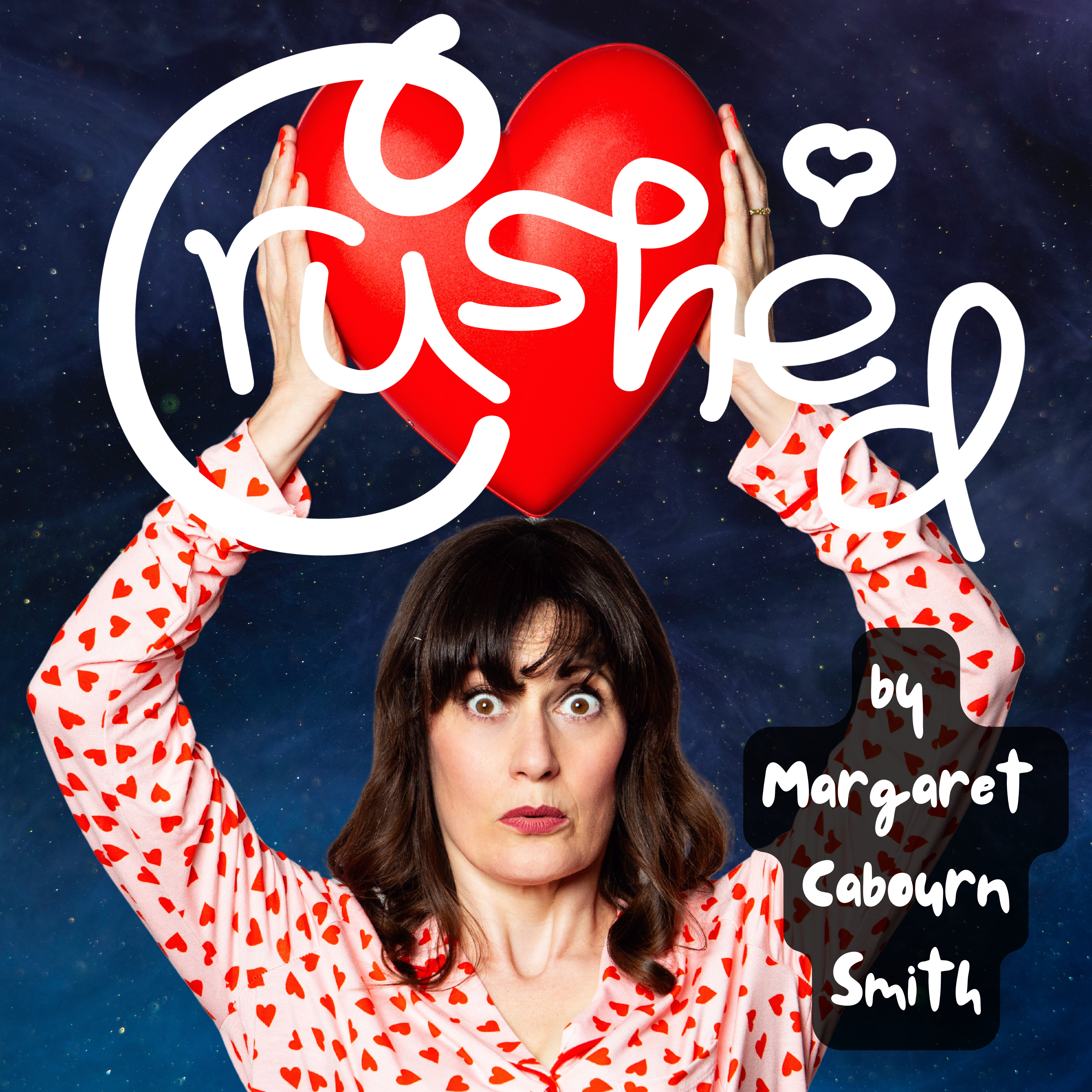

Her podcast Crushed by Margaret Cabourn-Smith, where she interviews funny people such as Sue Perkins, Dolly Alderton, Rosie Jones, Nish Kumar, Elizabeth Day, and Sarah Millican about unrequited love started in 2022 and has had over a million downloads.

It was listed in The Guardian as one of the best podcasts of all time, chosen by Deborah Frances-White.

- Shortlisted for the Health & Wellness award in Independent Podcast awards 2023
- Shortlisted for best comedy podcast in the PodBible awards 2023
- Interviewed Caitlin Moran and Sali Hughes at the London Podcast Festival 2023
- Crossed over with Guilty Feminist
- Podcast of the week in The Sunday Times
- Interviewed by Emma Firth for The Independent

== Selected filmography ==
- Daddy Issues (2024)
- Cheaters (2024)
- EastEnders (2023)
- Trying (2022)
- Buffering (2021)
- The Hustle (2019)
- The Evermoor Chronicles (2014–2017)
- Holby City (2017)
- Bucket (2017)
- Morgana Robinson's The Agency (2016)
- Motherland (2016–2021)
- Lolly Adefope's Christmas (2015)
- Catastrophe (2015)
- In and Out of the Kitchen (2015)
- Miranda (2009–2014)
- The IT Crowd (2010–2013)
- Father Figure (2013)
- Fresh Meat (2012)
- The Bleak Old Shop of Stuff (2012)
- The Increasingly Poor Decisions of Todd Margaret (2010)
- Mongrels (2010)
- A Very British Cult (2009)
- Katy Brand's Big Ass Show (2007–2009)
- Psychoville (2009)
- Things Talk (2009)
- LifeSpam: My Child is French (2009)
- Lab Rats (2008)
- Peep Show (2008)
- Comedy Cuts (2007)
- Open Casket (2004)
