= Richmond Theatre =

Richmond Theatre may refer to:

- Richmond Theatre (London), a theatre in the London Borough of Richmond
- Richmond Theatre (Richmond, Virginia), the name of several different former theatres in Richmond, Virginia
- Richmond Theatre (Surrey), a theatre in Richmond, Surrey from 1765–1884; successor to Pinkethman's theatre
- Richmond Theatre, a theatre in Richmond, Surrey established by William Pinkethman in the late 1710s

== See also ==
- Georgian Theatre Royal, a theatre and historic playhouse in Richmond, North Yorkshire, England
- Richmond Theatre fire, an 1811 fire in Richmond, Virginia
