= The Penny Dreadfuls =

British sketch comedy troupe

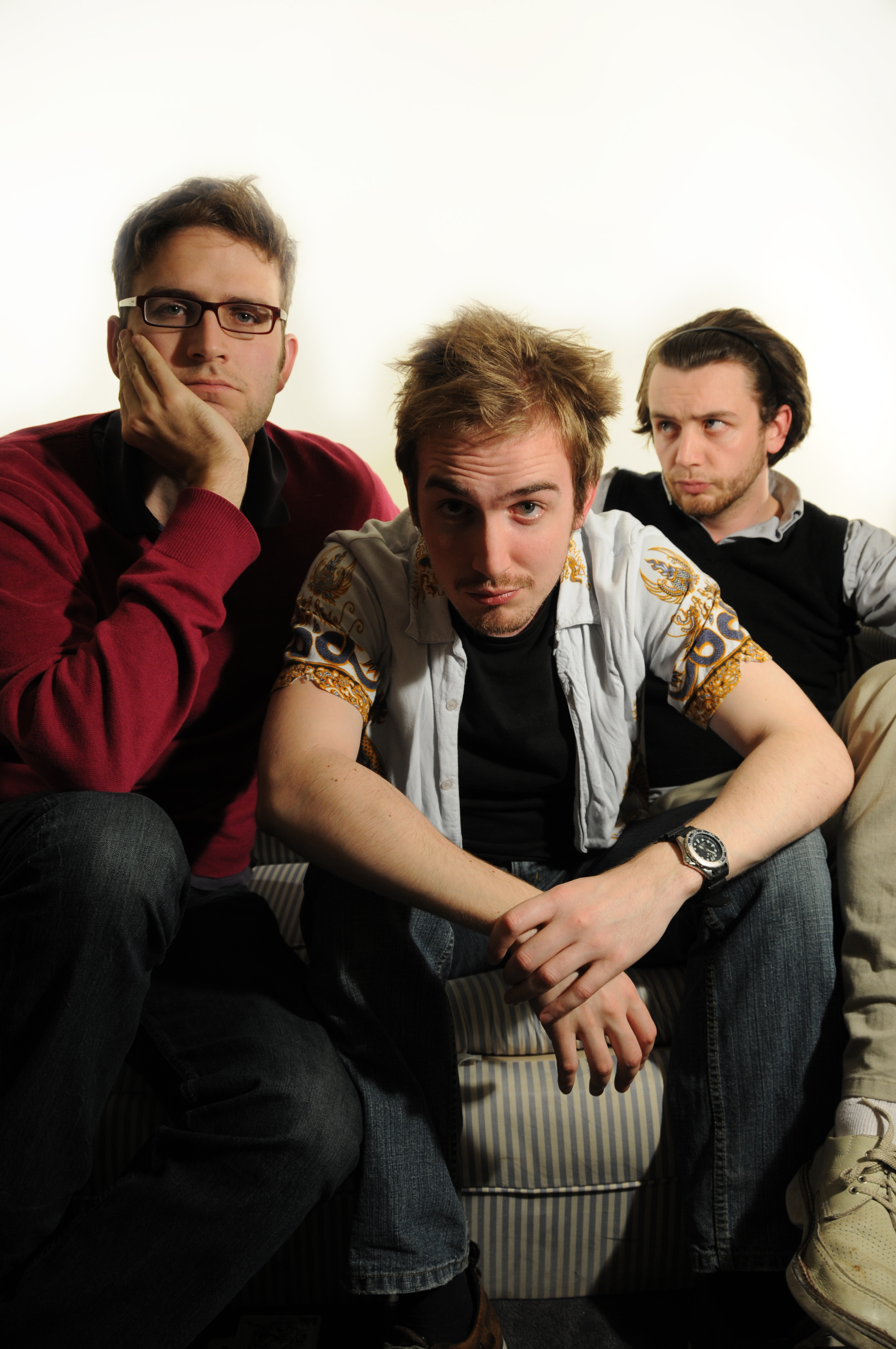
- The Penny Dreadfuls (L-R): Humphrey Ker, David Reed, Thom Tuck
- Notable work: The Brothers Faversham (2008–2009) The Penny Dreadfuls Present... (2010–present)

Comedy career
- Years active: 2006–present
- Medium: Theatre, Radio
- Genre: Sketch comedy
- Members: Humphrey Ker; David Reed; Thom Tuck

The Penny Dreadfuls are a British sketch comedy troupe consisting of comedians Humphrey Ker, David Reed and Thom Tuck, often supported by Margaret Cabourn-Smith. The troupe are best known for writing and performing The Brothers Faversham and The Penny Dreadfuls Present..., comic plays on BBC Radio 4.

== History ==
=== Early history and Fringe shows (2006–2010) ===
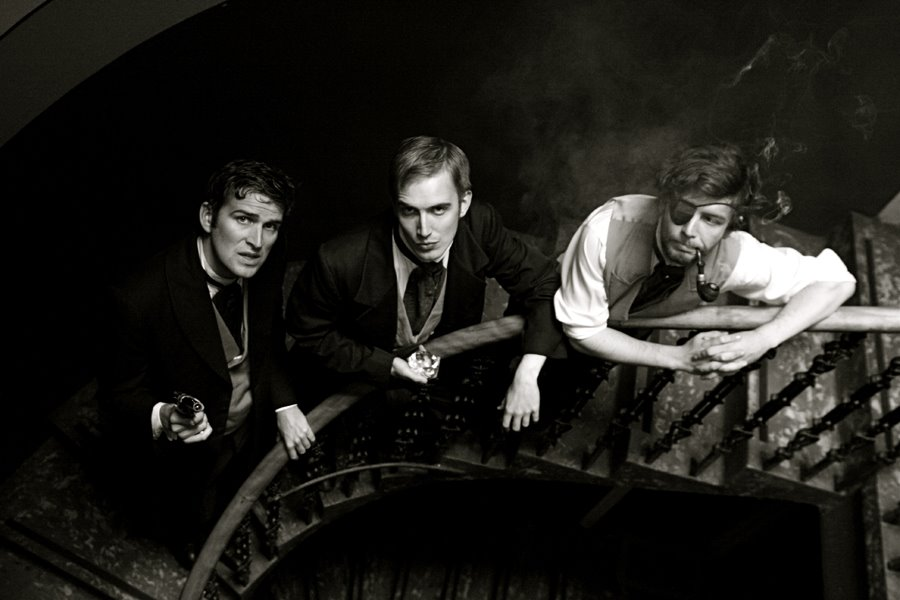
2008 photoshoot for Aeneas Faversham Forever

Ker, Reed and Tuck first met as students at the University of Edinburgh through the student comedy troupe The Improverts in 2001. They performed together for the next four years before forming, along with founding member Jamie Anderson, The Penny Dreadfuls. In 2006, they made their debut appearance at the Edinburgh Festival Fringe with their Victorian-themed sketch show Aeneas Faversham. The show's executive producer was Idil Sukan, while its associate producer and technical director were Steve Greer and Neil E Hobbs respectively. This group would go on to produce each Fringe show for the troupe for the next four years: Aeneas Faversham Returns in 2007, Aeneas Faversham Forever in 2008, The Never Man in 2009, and The Penny Dreadfuls in 2010.

=== TV & BBC Radio (2007–present) ===
The troupe appeared on television in 2007 with a sketch in BBC Three's Comedy Shuffle. They then made the transfer onto radio in January 2008 with their own show, The Brothers Faversham, guest starring Miles Jupp and Ingrid Oliver. The four-part series was a fictional biography following the life and demise of one of the Faversham brothers. A second series, More Brothers Faversham, was broadcast in October 2008 and later broadcast on BBC Radio 4.

Following on from this shift towards narrative comedy, in 2009 they wrote a comic retelling of the story of Guy Fawkes for the Afternoon Drama slot on Radio 4. While they returned to the sketch format for their 2010 Edinburgh Fringe show. their radio comedy followed in the vein of Guy Fawkes, writing a new historical comedy every year (except 2010 and 2013) for BBC Radio 4 until 2020.

In 2011 Margaret Cabourn-Smith played a supporting role in Revolution, and became a regular fixture in most subsequent The Penny Dreadfuls Presents... plays. From 2012 onward, each play in The Penny Dreadfuls Presents... series was credited solely to Reed.

== Radio episodes ==
All episodes star Ker, Reed, and Tuck.

=== The Brothers Faversham (2008) ===
#	Title	Written by	Guest Starring	Original airdate
1	"Horatius"	Ker, Reed, Tuck	Ingrid Oliver, Miles Jupp	11 January 2008
2	"Theseus"	Ker, Reed, Tuck	Ingrid Oliver, Miles Jupp	18 January 2008
3	"Leonidas"	Ker, Reed, Tuck	Ingrid Oliver, Miles Jupp	25 January 2008
4	"Augustus"	Ker, Reed, Tuck	Ingrid Oliver, Miles Jupp	1 February 2008

=== More Brothers Faversham (2008) ===
#	Title	Written by	Guest Starring	Original airdate
1	"Titus"	Ker, Reed, Tuck	Ingrid Oliver, Miles Jupp	5 October 2008
2	"Maximillian"	Ker, Reed, Tuck	Ingrid Oliver, Miles Jupp	12 October 2008
3	"Marcus"	Ker, Reed, Tuck	Ingrid Oliver, Miles Jupp	19 October 2008
4	"Perseus and Lucius"	Ker, Reed, Tuck	Ingrid Oliver, Miles Jupp	26 October 2008

=== The Penny Dreadfuls Present... (2009–2020) ===
Title	Written by	Guest Starring	Original airdate
"Guy Fawkes"	Ker, Reed, Tuck	Kevin Eldon, Miles Jupp, Andrew Pugsley	5 November 2009
"Revolution"	Ker, Reed, Tuck	Richard E. Grant, Sally Hawkins, Margaret Cabourn-Smith	9 July 2011
"Hereward the Wake"	Reed	Marek Larwood, Justin Edwards, Margaret Cabourn-Smith	26 December 2012
"Macbeth Rebothered"	Reed	Greg McHugh, Susan Calman, Margaret Cabourn-Smith	13 December 2014
"Odyssey"	Reed	Robert Webb, Lolly Adefope, Margaret Cabourn-Smith	25 October 2015
"The Curse of the Beagle"	Reed	Margaret Cabourn-Smith	30 July 2016
"Le Carré On Spying"	Reed	Miles Jupp, Mark Heap, Margaret Cabourn-Smith	8 July 2017
"Don Quixote"	Reed	Sylvester McCoy, Amanda Abbington, Vivienne Acheampong	25 August 2018
"Hadrian's Beard"	Reed	Tony Gardner, Mina Anwar	31 August 2019
"Richard III Rebothered"	Reed	Margaret Cabourn-Smith, Celeste Dring	13 April 2020

== Awards ==
Year	Award	Category	Nominee	Result
2007	Edinburgh Festival Fringe	Three Weeks Editors Award	Aeneas Faversham Returns	Won
2008	Brighton Festival Fringe	Latest 7 Best Comedy Award	Aeneas Faversham Forever	Won
2008	Edinburgh Festival Fringe	Total Theatre Award	Aeneas Faversham Forever	Nominated
