= Danielle Ward =

British stand-up comedian and writer

- Ward at Karaoke Circus, 100 club, 2009
- Born: Danielle Ward; Nottingham, England
- Spouse: David Reed
- Children: 1

Comedy career
- Years active: 2006-present
- Medium: Stand up, theatre, radio, television, music

Danielle Claire Ward is a British stand-up comedian and writer.

== Early life and education ==
Danielle Ward was born and raised in Nottingham.

She graduated from university in 2004.

== Career ==
=== Early career ===
Ward worked as an economic researcher at London's South Korean Embassy before she became a comedian.

=== Comedy ===
In 2006, Ward won the Time Out's Critic's Choice award for Best Newcomer and wrote Take A Break Tales – exaggerated adaptations of women's magazine stories – in which she appeared with Neil Edmond, Emma Fryer and Isy Suttie at the Edinburgh Festival Fringe. The next year she co-wrote Psister Psycho, a musical about a killer robotic lesbian nun, with Martin White for the 2007 Edinburgh Festival which was a cult hit and was nominated for the Chortle Award for Best Full Length Show 2008. She was also a regular member of Robin Ince's Book Club where she performed under the guise of Andy McNabb, Heather Mills McCartney, Adam Ant and David Bowie. She has performed five solo stand-up shows at the Edinburgh Fringe.

Ward has written for many comedy radio shows including The News Quiz, The Now Show, The Lee Mack Show, Look Away Now, Anna and Katy and Day the Music Died. She has written for TV shows including Horrible Histories, Harry Hill's TV Burp, Not Going Out and Mongrels.

=== Radio ===
Ward co-presented Dave Gorman's Absolute Radio Sunday morning show from when the show started in October 2009 until its end in November 2012. Her frequent collaborator Martin White was also a long term contributor to the show.

Ward created the BBC Radio 4 comedy panel show Dilemma, which ran for four series 2011-15 and was hosted by Sue Perkins. Danielle appeared several times as a guest on the show.

=== Music ===
Ward also hosts "Ward and White's Karaoke Circus", a live music karaoke night at the Edinburgh Festival, The 100 Club and its regular home of The Albany.

An experienced bass player she has released three albums with Cardiff indie band The Loves. She plays guitar in Brighton indie band The Super Wolfgang.

=== Podcasts ===
Alongside David Reed, Ward co-presented the weekly Absolute Radio film podcast, Film Fandango. The series began in November 2011. From November 2012, Ward has been in Phyllida Lloyd's all-female-cast stage production of Julius Caesar. In her absence from the Film Fandango podcast, her place was taken by comedian Marek Larwood, though she did appear alongside Reed and Larwood in the final episode of 2012 (episode 60).

Ward also hosted the Sony Award-winning comedy panel-show podcast Do the Right Thing in addition to devising and writing the comedy panel show Dilemma on BBC Radio 4. From 2017 Ward presented a podcast series called Any Stupid Questions where basic or perhaps silly questions people might be embarrassed to ask are posed to expert guests.

=== Script writer ===
Ward is known for her dark and idiosyncratic writing and was the holder of the BBC Radio Comedy Writers Bursary in 2006–2007. Ward featured on Newswipe with Charlie Brooker for BBC Four. For children, Ward has written on Danger Mouse and Minnie The Minx.

In March 2023 Ward was announced to have gained a place on the BBC Writersroom pilot scheme. She wrote episodes of In the Long Run and Brassic. In December 2023, filming began on a Ward-scripted comedy series for BBC Three entitled Daddy Issues and starring David Morrissey and Aimee Lou Wood. The show premiered on 15 August 2024.

== Personal life ==
Ward is married to David Reed and has a daughter (born September 2017).

== Awards ==
Year	Award	Category	Nominee	Result
2004	BBC New Comedy Award	New Comedy	n/a	Nominated
2006	Time Out Critic's Choice Award	Best Newcomer	Take A Break Tales	Won
2008	Chortle Awards	Best Full Length Show	Psister Psycho	Nominated
2012	Chortle Awards	Best Internet Comedy	Do the Right Thing	Nominated
2012	Sony Awards	Best Internet Comedy	Do the Right Thing	Nominated
