= Martin White (comedian) =

English musician, comedian and animator

- On stage in Edinburgh, 23 August 2009

Martin White is an English musician, comedian and animator. As well as performing solo with an accordion around the London comedy circuit, White also fronts the Mystery Fax Machine Orchestra and the Karaoke Circus live bands. He performs jingles regularly in the comedy podcast Answer Me This!.

White co-wrote Psister Psycho – a musical about a killer robotic lesbian nun – with Danielle Ward for the 2007 Edinburgh Festival Fringe. The show was nominated for the Chortle Award for Best Full Length Show 2008.

With Ward, White co-presented Dave Gorman's Sunday morning show on Absolute Radio, where White performed an improvised song, covering as many of the topics discussed on that week's show as possible, accompanied by a range instruments such as the accordion. His contract was not renewed by Absolute, and he left the show in April 2012.
