= David Reed (comedian) =

British actor, comedian and writer (born 1982)

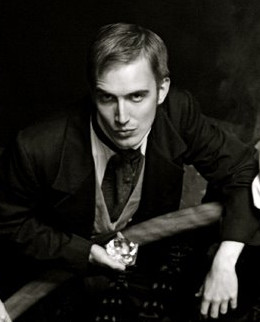
- Reed in 2008
- Born: David Marshall Reed; 26 May 1982 (age 44); York, North Yorkshire, England
- Spouse: Danielle Ward

Comedy career
- Years active: 2006–present
- Medium: Stand up, theatre, radio, television
- Genre: Sketch comedy

David Reed (born 26 May 1982) is a British actor, comedian and writer. He is one third of comedy troupe The Penny Dreadfuls.

== Career ==
Reed studied at the University of Edinburgh. During his studies he performed with the Edinburgh University Theatre Company, acting in, writing and directing two pantomime productions, and was a member of acclaimed improvisational comedy troupe The Improverts. It was with The Improverts that he first met and performed with fellow comedians Humphrey Ker and Thom Tuck. He was also a frequent performer in the local comedy circuit and at The Stand.

In 2008, Reed became the drummer for Karaoke Circus, a show where comedians perform songs with an accompanying live band. Since October 2011 he has co-hosted a weekly film podcast for Absolute Radio with Karaoke Circus bassist Danielle Ward. In 2011 he performed his debut solo show Shamblehouse at The Edinburgh Festival Fringe.

in 2022, Reed's play Guy Fawkes was staged at York Theatre Royal from 28 October to 12 November.

=== The Penny Dreadfuls ===
Reed is probably best known for writing and performing alongside Humphrey Ker and Thom Tuck in sketch comedy team The Penny Dreadfuls. They performed their Victorian sketch show across Britain, including at The Edinburgh Festival Fringe, with Aeneas Faversham in 2006, Aeneas Faversham Returns in 2007 and Aeneas Faversham Forever in 2008.

Their radio series The Brothers Faversham was first broadcast on BBC 7 in early January 2008. The second series, More Brothers Faversham, was aired in October 2008 and later repeated on Radio 4.

In 2009 they presented a broadcast for BBC Radio 4's Afternoon Play slot, Guy Fawkes. This covered the life of Guy Fawkes, his failed attempt to blow up Parliament and his subsequent interrogation in the Tower of London. Guest starring Kevin Eldon as Guy Fawkes, and also featuring Miles Jupp and Andrew Pugsley.

In 2011 they produced another radio play, Revolution. This time for the prestigious Saturday Play slot. Set in the aftermath of The French Revolution, it starred Sally Hawkins as Marie-Therese, the only surviving daughter of Louis XVI and Marie-Antoinette, and Richard E. Grant as the villainous Robespierre.

=== Film Fandango ===
In October 2011 Reed launched a weekly film podcast called Film Fandango for Absolute Radio with fellow comedian and partner Danielle Ward. Each episode a guest was brought on the show to discuss a new or upcoming cinema release as well as a film of his or her choosing. Ward continued on as a co-host of the show until October 2012, when she was replaced by Marek Larwood. The show continued with Absolute Radio until 2013, after which Reed and Larwood continued the podcast on their own until 2018, when Film Fandango ended with a total of 327 episodes.

=== Shows ===
2006 Edinburgh Festival Fringe

- Aeneas Faversham

2007 Edinburgh Festival Fringe

- Aeneas Faversham Returns

2008 Edinburgh Festival Fringe

- Aeneas Faversham Forever

2009 Edinburgh Festival Fringe

- The Never Man

2010 Edinburgh Festival Fringe

- The Penny Dreadfuls

2011 Edinburgh Festival Fringe

- David Reed Shamblehouse

=== Television ===
- Comedy Shuffle
- The Wrong Door
- Channel 4 Comedy Lab Ain't It Funny Being Coloured
- As Peter Cook in the BBC's Frankie Howerd: Rather You Than Me
- As dodgy builder in Transmission Impossible with Ed & Oucho alongside Ed Petrie and Warrick Brownlow-Pike.
- As Rupert Fanshaw in Gary: Tank Commander
- Fast and Loose
- It's Kevin (2013)
- As Brendan in Father Figure (2013)
- Father Brown (2017) as Giles Foster in episode 5.11 "The Sins of Others"
- Ghosts (2022)
