= Humphrey Ker =

British actor and comedian (born 1982)

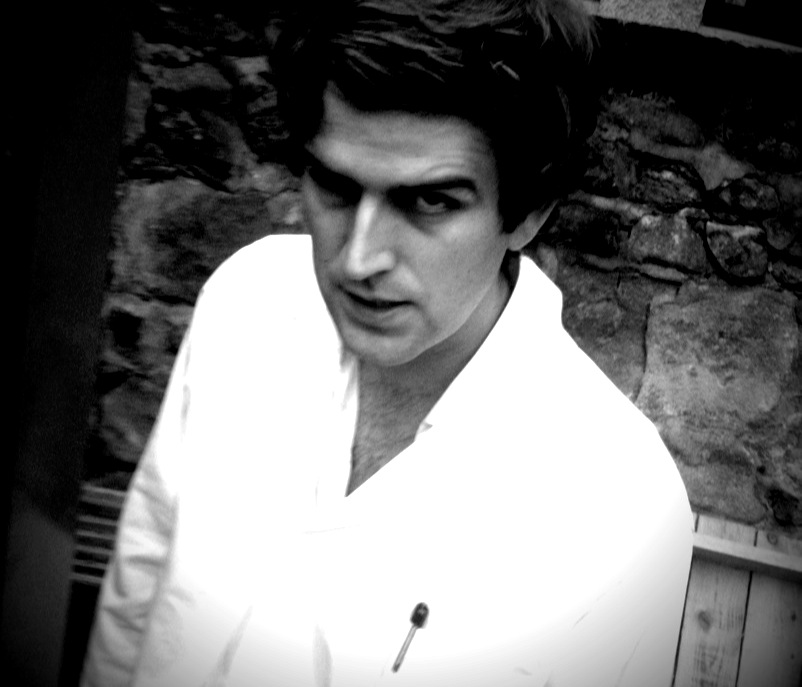
- Ker in 2009
- Born: David Humphrey Rivers Ker; 11 October 1982 (age 44); London, England
- Notable work: The Penny Dreadfuls
- Spouse: Megan Ganz (m. 2015)

Comedy career
- Medium: Stand up, television
- Genre: Sketch comedy

David Humphrey Rivers Ker (/kɑːr/; born 11 October 1982) is a British actor, comedian, writer and football executive, who is a member of the sketch comedy troupe The Penny Dreadfuls. Outside of The Penny Dreadfuls, he has done work as a solo artist, appearing regularly on the comedy television series Fast and Loose and Live at the Electric, as well as on numerous BBC Radio 4 shows. He has also served as executive director of Wrexham A.F.C. since his friends, fellow actors Rob McElhenney and Ryan Reynolds, bought the club.

== Early life and education ==
Ker was born to David Peter James Ker, a fine art dealer, and Alexandra Mary, daughter of Vice-Admiral Sir Dymock Watson. He is also a descendant on his father's side of the politician Henry Howard, 18th Earl of Suffolk.

Ker is 6 ft 7 in (2.01 m) tall. He was educated at Ludgrove School and Eton College, alongside classmate William, current Prince of Wales. According to Ker, he and William "literally shared a bedroom from year 7 until 10". He later studied history at the University of Edinburgh, and performed in Edinburgh University Theatre Company pantomime productions. Ker performed with fellow students David Reed and Thom Tuck as a member of this comedy troupe.

== Career ==
In 2006, Ker, together with Reed and Tuck, formed The Penny Dreadfuls, who have performed their Victorian sketch shows across Britain, including at the Edinburgh Fringe with Aeneas Faversham in 2006 and Aeneas Faversham Returns in 2007. Since then, he has appeared in Comedy Shuffle for BBC Three and the short film I am Bob, starring Bob Geldof. Ker was also co-anchor on the short-lived internet-based satirical news programme Log.tv. with Rufus Hound.

The Penny Dreadfuls radio series The Brothers Faversham was first broadcast on BBC 7 in early January 2008. The second series, More Brothers Faversham, was aired in October 2008 and later repeated on Radio 4. The trio also wrote and starred in a 2010 comedy drama for BBC Radio 4 about Guy Fawkes. More recently, Ker has been working increasingly as a solo artist. He was a regular in the improvisational comedy show Fast and Loose, hosted by Hugh Dennis in early 2011. Later that year, he appeared as part of the 24 Hour Panel People charity show hosted by David Walliams for Red Nose Day 2011, in the Whose Line Is It Anyway? section. He has also appeared on 8 Out of 10 Cats, and in August 2013, on the show's crossover with Countdown. He also appeared as a regular on the BBC Three show Live at the Electric.

In August 2011 Ker presented a feature-length debut solo show at the Edinburgh Fringe entitled Humphrey Ker is...Dymock Watson: Nazi Smasher!, for which he won the Edinburgh Comedy Award for Best Newcomer. The show was loosely based on the real-life story of his grandfather, Dymock Watson, who was a Special Operations Executive agent in WWII. Ker has performed Dymock Watson: Nazi Smasher! at London's Soho Theatre, the West End's Fortune Theatre and in Los Angeles at the Upright Citizens Brigade Theatre.

Ker has appeared as a guest on various BBC Radio 4 shows, including It's Your Round with Angus Deayton, Sandi Toksvig and Milton Jones and Dilemma with Sue Perkins, Phill Jupitus and Susan Calman. He is the host of the upcoming BBC Radio 4 sketch show Sketcherama. In April 2012 Ker appeared as a panelist on BBC's Have I Got News for You, in May 2013, on the BBC Radio 4 show The News Quiz, and in August 2013 on 8 out of 10 Cats Does Countdown. Ker also guest-starred on the NBC comedy Sean Saves the World in January 2014.

In 2013, Ker was the Curator in series 6 of the BBC Radio 4 comedy panel game The Museum of Curiosity.

In 2018, Ker was cast in the reboot of Greatest American Hero for ABC, and appeared in an episode of It's Always Sunny in Philadelphia.

In December 2021, Ker began playing the part of Elliot on the NBC sitcom American Auto.

Ker appears in the Apple TV+ original show Mythic Quest, which was co-created by his wife, Megan Ganz.

In November 2025, Ker and David Reed's comedy play Sherlock Holmes and The 12 Days of Christmas premiered at the Birmingham Repertory Theatre. It featured original songs by Tim Rice and Andrew Lloyd Webber.

In March 2026, Ker was announced as part of the writing team for the first series of Saturday Night Live UK.

== Wrexham A.F.C. and Welcome to Wrexham ==
While filming the opening season of Mythic Quest, Ker introduced his fandom for English football, and watching midweek matches of Liverpool F.C., to fellow actor, and executive producer of Mythic Quest, Rob McElhenney. During the COVID-19 lockdowns, Ker recommended McElhenney watch the sports series documentaries Sunderland ’Til I Die and All Or Nothing. Ker later said of McElhenney:

"I thought, 'That’s the key to this. He's a storyteller. He needs to understand the story of football'... The All Or Nothing documentaries are very good, but they don't cut to the heart of the game, which is the fans. Rob being Rob, he devoured every documentary. He's a doer, so he said, 'Let's buy a football club'."

Not long after exposing McElhenney to the fanaticism of the sport, McElhenney sent Ker back to his home country to find a football club for McElhenney and his friend, actor Ryan Reynolds, to buy. Ker established a set of criteria, among them facilities, fanbase, history and finance. Ker's research led him to the Welsh football club Wrexham A.F.C.

In September 2020, McElhenney and Reynolds announced their intention to buy Wrexham A.F.C. In February 2021, Ker was announced as executive director at the club following the takeover by McElhenney and Reynolds.

The process of Ker's involvement with the club and McElhenney and Reynolds' investment in Wrexham is covered by the multi-season TV documentary series Welcome to Wrexham.

In September 2026, Ker stepped down from the board of Wrexham A.F.C. and as a trustee of the Wrexham A.F.C. Foundation.
