= List of Miranda episodes =

Miranda is a British television series, created, co-written and starring comedian Miranda Hart. It features Sarah Hadland, Tom Ellis, Patricia Hodge and Sally Phillips. The series was originally broadcast on BBC Two where it achieved high ratings, before moving to BBC One due to its success. It is based on Hart's semi-autobiographical writing and followed a television pilot and the BBC Radio 2 comedy Miranda Hart's Joke Shop.

During the course of the programme, 20 episodes of Miranda aired, including two specials over three series, between 9 November 2009 and 1 January 2015.

== Series overview ==
Series	Episodes	Originally released			Ave. UK viewers (million)
Series	Episodes	First released	Last released	Network	Ave. UK viewers (million)
1	6	9 November 2009	14 December 2009	BBC Two	2.72
2	6	15 November 2010	20 December 2010	BBC Two	3.55
3	6	26 December 2012	28 January 2013	BBC One	9.48
Specials	2	25 December 2014	1 January 2015	BBC One	9.21

== Episodes ==
=== Series 1 (2009) ===
No. overall	No. in series	Title	Directed by	Written by	Original release date	Viewers (millions)
1	1	"Date"	Juliet May	Miranda Hart	9 November 2009	2.63
After going to a restaurant for a reunion lunch with Tilly and Fanny, Miranda bumps into an old friend, Gary, who, after returning from travelling, is working in the restaurant as a chef and asks her out for a drink. Excited about her first real date, she goes shopping for a new outfit to impress, but is mistaken for a transvestite. After the date ends disappointingly, the next day they agree to another drink. She joins Tilly and Fanny wedding dress shopping, and they persuade her to try on a dress. Gary and her mother pass by the shop and see her through the window; Penny faints, and Miranda chases Gary down the street to explain that she is not desperate. Known as "It's a Date" on the DVD.
2	2	"Teacher"	Juliet May	Miranda Hart and Richard Hurst	16 November 2009	2.76
After Miranda quickly agrees to become Gary's safety wife, she decides to create a spontaneous romantic moment with him so he will see her in a new light. Stevie persuades her to join a French language evening course with her to help her feel more sophisticated and passionate. Miranda goes, but discovers that the class is run by her old school teacher Mr Clayton (Peter Davison). After leaving, she passes a tango class and invites Gary to join her. They attend and the potential "moments" pass after disagreement. The next evening Gary gives her a cooking lesson, when another potential "moment" leads to another disagreement. Known as "In the Mood" on the DVD.
3	3	"Job"	Juliet May	Miranda Hart and James Cary	23 November 2009	2.61
After never having an "obvious career path", Penny's disappointed that her daughter doesn't have a proper job. Tilly's promotion leads Penny to tell her that Miranda has a new job in television and is only in the joke shop as a reporter, and Miranda decides to prove her mother wrong and find a new career. After gaining a job at a department store and losing it while trying to cancel her gym membership, she waitresses at Gary's restaurant. After Tilly sees her waitressing, Penny declares she's undercover in the forces, which Tilly does not believe until Gary appears in his RAF cadet uniform and carrying her out of the restaurant in his arms (echoing the final scene of An Officer and a Gentleman). Known as "Just the Job" on the DVD.
4	4	"Holiday"	Juliet May	Miranda Hart, James Cary and Richard Hurst	30 November 2009	3.14
When a new customer makes Miranda realise she isn't cool, but she is young, free and single, she spontaneously informs everyone that she will go off to Thailand for a few days. To save the hassle, she instead decides to secretly book into a hotel down the road. She enjoys the perks of staying in the hotel and makes friends in porter Jason (Luke Pasqualino) and Colin (Dave Lamb), a conference organiser. After sneaking into her shop and flat, unintentionally ordering an escort (who turns out to be Clive), getting drunk after having a party and being confused for a seminar speaker, Penny, Clive, Gary and Stevie find out the truth about her holiday. The real seminar speaker then arrives and turns out to be the customer that started this mess in the first place, causing Miranda to jump out of a window to escape. Known as "Mum's the Word" on the DVD.
5	5	"Excuse"	Juliet May	Miranda Hart and James Cary	7 December 2009	2.43
After attending a wedding, Penny decides to hold a Pride and Prejudice-themed party to set Miranda up with Edmund Dettori. She fails to excuse herself, but the party's cancelled when Tilly sets her up with an army doctor friend, "Dreamboat" Charlie (Adrian Scarborough). The date goes badly, and Penny reorganises the party. To avoid being set up by her mother, Miranda decides to tell her she is a lesbian and the party is changed to a Tipping the Velvet-themed coming out party. At the party, Miranda sees Edmund (Alex Hassell) and then announces she is straight, but after an introduction she can't stand his high-pitched voice. Known as "Let It Out" on the DVD.
6	6	"Dog"	Juliet May	Miranda Hart and Richard Hurst	14 December 2009	2.73
When a man leaves his wallet in the shop, Miranda and Stevie compete against each other to see who he would prefer to take out to dinner, going as far as to get dogs. To prove she can handle a tricky social situation, Miranda accepts an invitation to the Henley Regatta with Tilly and Fanny, who ask her not to embarrass herself and them. Meanwhile, Gary has been offered a job in Hong Kong and Miranda fails to ask him to stay after Clive tells her that Gary appears to be waiting for her to ask him to. At his leaving party, a music change from the DJ interrupts their discussion and Gary leaves unnoticed. Known as "What a Dog" on the DVD.

=== Series 2 (2010) ===
No. overall	No. in series	Title	Directed by	Written by	Original release date	Viewers (millions)
7	1	"The New Me"	Juliet May	Miranda Hart	15 November 2010	3.19
Miranda has been feeling down since Gary went to Hong Kong and Stevie persuades her to move on. She decides to become a new woman and meets a handsome new American chef, Danny (Michael Landes), who asks her out. Instead, Miranda causes havoc in a sushi bar and Penny temporarily moves in with her. When purchasing a new bed, she gets mistaken for the new employee and ends up talking to the rest of the workers who convince her to renounce men. Danny later returns to her place, and kisses her in the restaurant the next day, just as Gary returns. Danny senses that he is in the middle of something and departs. Additional Material: Tony Roche, Georgia Pritchett, Paul Powell, James Cary and Paul Kerensa
8	2	"Before I Die"	Juliet May	Miranda Hart	22 November 2010	3.37
After attending the funeral of her Great Uncle Jim, Miranda starts to consider what her own eulogy would sound like. After seeing Penny and Tilly organising a charity wine tasting event, she decides to do good by reading to the elderly at a hospice and participating in a charity parachute jump, but they both end miserably. After Chris and Allison hear about all the supposed "good" Miranda has been doing, they announce that she will be the godmother and birthing partner to their baby, much to Miranda's disgust. She decides to prove to them both that she is not worthy of being a godmother, so she reads Mein Kampf to children, however they don't see it. Finally, Miranda loses her temper with the duo at the wine tasting event and punches 'James' the vicar in front of them both, causing them to leave. As Miranda is about to get chucked out, two people stand up for her claiming that they have seen her doing good things. Additional Material: James Cary, Richard Hurst, Paul Powell, Paul Kerensa, Jason Hazeley and Joel Morris
9	3	"Let's Do It"	Juliet May	Miranda Hart	29 November 2010	4.01
Stevie and Clive decide it is time for Miranda and Gary to go on a date and they set them up. During dinner, Gary suggests that they sleep together and Miranda agrees. However, their decision to be spontaneous does not go well. Meanwhile, Tilly, who is busy planning her wedding to Rupert (Adam James), decides again to set Miranda up with her friend, Charlie (Adrian Scarborough). Rupert becomes attracted to Miranda and she has to find a way of telling Tilly. Miranda is then trapped in her flat with Rupert, Charlie and Gary, trying to get out of the situation. Additional Material: Simon Dean, Paul Kerensa, Richard Hurst, James Cary and Paul Powell
10	4	"A New Low"	Juliet May	Miranda Hart	6 December 2010	2.85
Miranda and Stevie endeavour to befriend the hip new young waitress, Tamara (Stacy Liu). However, they struggle when Tamara suggests staying up all night before swimming in the morning. Miranda is forced to face her problems with nudity after an art class experience. When Tamara does not keep up with her job, Clive lets slip that Gary and Tamara are married as Tamara needed a green card, which leads to an argument between Miranda and Gary. Meanwhile, Penny buys a mobile phone and has trouble reading her messages. Additional Material: Paul Kerensa, Paul Powell, Richard Hurst and James Cary
11	5	"Just Act Normal"	Juliet May	Miranda Hart	13 December 2010	3.19
Miranda and Penny attend a therapy session after an incident at a park, which saw the police get involved when they thought Miranda was trying to kidnap a class of children with twenty-nine ice-creams she forgot to pay for. Their therapist, Anthony (Mark Heap), remains mostly silent, which proves unnerving to both Miranda and Penny. They try to act normal, which proves difficult for the both of them. Notes: This is the only episode in which Sarah Hadland does not appear. This is also the first episode to take place entirely in one location. Additional Material: James Cary, Richard Hurst, Georgia Pritchett, Paul Kerensa and Paul Powell
12	6	"The Perfect Christmas"	Juliet May	Miranda Hart	20 December 2010	4.70
Miranda's presents that she ordered online have not arrived and she needs to escape Christmas with her mother and father (Tom Conti). After a trip to see the doctor (Adam Rayner), she organises her presents to be re-delivered and she makes up with Gary. Miranda and Stevie decide to spend Christmas day in her flat with Clive, Gary and Tilly. However, following a couple of arguments, Miranda decides to spend Christmas with her parents after all. Note: This is Clive's last regular appearance. He did not feature in Series 3, but was mentioned as an off-screened character. He returns in the second of the two finale specials, "The Final Curtain". Additional Material: James Cary, Richard Hurst, Paul Powell, Paul Kerensa, Will Ing and Dan Gaster

=== Series 3 (2012–13) ===
Miranda was recommissioned for a third series by BBC Comedy commissioner Cheryl Taylor in January 2011. It was later confirmed that the third series would be broadcast from 26 December 2012. The series consists of six episodes.

No. overall	No. in series	Title	Directed by	Written by	Original release date	Viewers (millions)
13	1	"It Was Panning"	Juliet May	Miranda Hart	26 December 2012	11.55
Miranda has agreed to be just friends with Gary, but it proves difficult for them both. Meanwhile, the joke shop has gone out of business, so after being inspired by Stevie and Tilly, Miranda gets a job in an office. Penny tries to help Miranda get her life under control and she makes her daughter join a weight loss class, after she is featured in a news report about obesity. Miranda later learns from the reporter, Mike (Bo Poraj), that the camera was just panning. She and Stevie then agree to be business partners and reopen the shop. Additional Material: Richard Hurst, Georgia Pritchett, Paul Powell, Paul Kerensa and Jason Cook
14	2	"What a Surprise"	Juliet May	Miranda Hart	1 January 2013	10.47
Miranda decides to find a boyfriend when Gary starts dating Rose (Naomi Bentley). She meets Mike, the local news reader, at a nightclub and he asks her out on a date, which does not go well. When Penny runs for a position on the local council, Tilly helps her with her campaign. When Miranda is arrested for impersonating a police officer, Penny helps her out, so she can go on a second date with Mike. He later calls himself her boyfriend and Miranda reveals to Gary that she is happy. Additional Material: Richard Hurst, Georgia Pritchett, Paul Powell, Paul Kerensa and Jason Cook
15	3	"The Dinner Party"	Juliet May	Miranda Hart	7 January 2013	8.84
Miranda tries to prove to Stevie that she can be a mature adult, so she babysits for Chris and Allison at the soft play centre, only for her back muscles to strain, causing her to go to an osteopath. On her second day, she decides it's time to meet Mike's father, so she agrees to cook for him and hosts a couples dinner party. However her attempts at cooking at a salmon terrine fail, so she buys one instead. When meeting Mike's father; Valerie Jackford (Tim Pigott-Smith), she realises he is the osteopath from the day before. The dinner party quickly turns into a disaster, with Valerie making out of pocket jokes, Miranda throwing her meat out of the window, and her burnt crêpes suzette falling onto Valerie's toupée. Additional Material: Richard Hurst, Georgia Pritchett, Paul Powell and Paul Kerensa
16	4	"Je Regret Nothing"	Juliet May	Miranda Hart	14 January 2013	8.88
Miranda spends five days trapped in her flat caring for her sick mother. When she finds her first grey hair, Miranda worries that she has done nothing with her life and decides to live free from regrets. She comes up with a bucket list, but before she can start doing any of the activities on it, she falls ill with the flu. Miranda initially receives little sympathy from Penny and her friends. But when she starts to recover, she pretends to still be ill to take advantage of their generosity. Penny, Tilly, Stevie and Gary catch Miranda out, but then fall ill themselves. Note: This is the second episode to take place entirely in one location. Additional Material: Richard Hurst, Rose Heiney, Georgia Pritchett, Paul Powell and Paul Kerensa
17	5	"Three Little Words"	Juliet May	Miranda Hart	21 January 2013	8.44
Miranda starts to wonder why she can't say "I love you" back to Mike, and later realises she isn't in love with him. When Gary comes into her shop to ask her to help him for the restaurant reopening, she also realises that she is in love with Gary. Miranda's attempts at telling Mike that she isn't in love with him and telling Gary she loves him are consistently interrupted by her change of broadband packages and Raymond Blanc. Finally, Gary gets into an argument with Miranda and she blurts out that she is in love with him. Additional Material: Richard Hurst, Georgia Pritchett, Paul Powell and Paul Kerensa
18	6	"A Brief Encounter"	Juliet May	Miranda Hart	28 January 2013	8.70
Penny announces that she and Charles are renewing their vows, while Tilly introduces everyone to her new boyfriend – "Dreamboat" Charlie. Miranda tries to get over Gary and decides to go to Morocco. She initially stays at a local hotel and then gets stopped at airport security for having a cat in her case. Miranda puts her flat up for sale and decides to go to Wick indefinitely. Gary goes to the station to stop Miranda from leaving and declares his feelings for her. Mike returns and both he and Gary propose to Miranda, leaving her to choose between them, ending the series on a cliffhanger. Additional Material: Richard Hurst, Georgia Pritchett, Paul Powell and Paul Kerensa

=== Specials (2014–15) ===
No. overall	Title	Directed by	Written by	Original release date	Viewers (millions)
19	"I Do, But To Who?" (Part 1)	Mandie Fletcher	Miranda Hart	25 December 2014	8.81
Miranda accepts Gary's proposal and later that evening after many failed attempts they finally sleep together but she then becomes worried that he has never told her that he loves her. Stevie and Miranda fall out, while Gary is worried when Tilly and Penny begin planning the wedding. Tilly and Charlie also get engaged. Miranda and Stevie make up when they go camping. When Miranda confronts Gary about whether he loves her, he believes Miranda does not trust him and they break up. Additional Material: Richard Hurst, Georgia Pritchett, Paul Powell and Paul Kerensa
20	"The Final Curtain" (Part 2)	Mandie Fletcher	Miranda Hart	1 January 2015	9.61
Miranda tries to move on from Gary following their break-up. When Penny tries to find another groom, Miranda finally tells her to get out of her life until she can accept her for who she is. Stevie, Penny and Tilly become worried about Miranda's strange behaviour and hold an intervention. Miranda realises that she wants Gary back and discovers that he is at a wedding. Assuming he is about to get married, Miranda stops the wedding and learns Gary was just acting as best man for Clive. She and Gary make up and they marry at the restaurant. Additional Material: Richard Hurst, Georgia Pritchett, Paul Powell and Paul Kerensa

== Other media ==
=== Miranda's Pineapple Dance Studios (2011) ===
Miranda takes over the Pineapple Dance Studios and teams up with the dancers and JLS whose newly appointed PR guru is none other than Miranda's boarding school frenemy Tilly. This was a sketch for the BBC's "Comic Relief" appeal and broadcast on 18 March 2011. It had a viewing figure of 10.26 million.

=== Miranda Does Sport Relief (2012) ===
Stevie and Penny go to the Royal Albert Hall to watch the tennis, while Miranda believes she is attending the Proms. Miranda is mistaken for a male pro and she plays against Tim Henman, before being kissed by Goran Ivanišević. Broadcast on 23 March 2012, it was watched by 5.92 million viewers.

=== Miranda: My Such Fun Celebration (2020) ===
To mark the 10th anniversary of the start of the show, the cast were recorded at the London Palladium in 2019 celebrating and commemorating the series. Hart announced the special on Twitter while stressing that it would not be a new episode. The 70-minute programme Miranda: My Such Fun Celebration was broadcast on BBC One on 1 January 2020.
