= I Do, But To Who? =

- Miranda episode
- Episode no.: Episode 19
- Directed by: Mandie Fletcher
- Written by: Miranda Hart
- Editing by: Gavin Buckley
- Production code: 1
- Original air date: 25 December 2014
- Running time: 35 minutes

Guest appearances
- Bo Poraj as Michael Jackford; Adrian Scarborough as Charlie; Charles Venn as Keith; Sophie Pelman as Posh Girl; Luisa Omielan as Louise; John Finnemore as Chris; Margaret Cabourn-Smith as Alison; Rufus Wright as Vicar; Hilary Whitehall as Veronica; Letty Butler as Jacinta; Joe Wilkinson as Norman; Liza Tarbuck as Registrar

Episode chronology
← Previous "A Brief Encounter"	Next → "The Final Curtain"

"I Do, But To Who?" is the 2014 Christmas special and the nineteenth episode overall of the BBC sitcom, Miranda. The first of two specials which ended the series, the episode was written by the show's creator and star Miranda Hart with additional material from Richard Hurst, Georgia Pritchett, Paul Powell and Paul Kerensa and directed by Mandie Fletcher. It was screened on 25 December 2014, almost two years on from the premiere of the show's third series, and resolved the cliffhanger that was left at the end of the last episode of series three.

== Development ==
Due to the cliffhanger at the end of the third series, it was suspected that Miranda would return for a fourth series. However, in July 2014, Hart announced that there are no plans for a fourth series but 'a couple of specials' would be made.

In September 2014, co-star Sarah Hadland said that two Christmas specials will be filmed in November. Hart later announced that the two Christmas specials would be the end to the sitcom. Hart said the end was “going to be really emotional,” but added that she didn't want her sitcom character "to keep falling over and making a fool of herself".

The episode features the final appearances of several recurring cast members, including Bo Poraj as Michael Jackford and John Finnemore and Margaret Cabourn-Smith as married couple Chris and Alison, while Letty Butler makes her debut as Jacinta, a new waitress at Gary's restaurant who was referred to offscreen in the third series episode "Je Regret Nothing". The episode also features uncredited appearances by Katy Wix as Fanny (“Dog”), Michael Landes as Danny ("The New Me"), Stacy Liu as Tamara ("A New Low"), Tim Pigott-Smith as Valerie Jackford ("The Dinner Party") and Adam Rayner as Dr Gail (“Je Regret Nothing”) via archival footage in flashbacks.

== Promotion ==
The BBC released a thirty-second trailer of the episode on 19 December 2014 depicting the lead-up to Miranda making her decision about which proposal to accept.

== Plot ==
Faced with two proposals, Miranda initially flees the scene of all the chaos of the restaurant. Stevie helps her sort out her qualms, and when Mike and Gary arrive to hear her answer, she knows what she wants to do. She loves Mike, but she's in love with Gary, and chooses him. Mike, though disappointed, departs amicably. Gary then offers her a 'proper proposal' with a Monster Munch crisp as a ring.

Gary then asks if he can spend the night at Miranda's, and she happily agrees, while Stevie becomes upset that their friendship will never be the same. Miranda assures her nothing will change, and challenges her to a game of snack Jenga.

That evening while awaiting Gary, Stevie shows up at Miranda's with a stack of pepperoni for Jenga. When Gary does show, he and Miranda are thwarted by Stevie's presence and when Miranda asks her friend to go, Stevie starts a diatribe, until Gary simply picks her up and puts her outside. He and Miranda then head to the bedroom.

The next morning, Gary tells Miranda she's going to make him very happy, just before Penny and Tilly descend upon them with a mood board and a wedding guest list of 450 people. Gary says he cannot cope with that sort of thing, and suggests to Miranda they get married in no more than three weeks, she's delighted, but concerned by the fact he has yet to actually say "I love you".

Among the attendees at Gary and Miranda’s engagement party are the vicar performing the wedding, who previously officiated at the funeral of Miranda’s relative; Veronica, vice president of Belinda and Penny’s tennis club; Chris and Alison, who are expecting another child but their marriage has soured; Jacinta, the new waitress at the restaurant whom Miranda is intimidated by; Stevie and her occasional traffic warden boyfriend Norman; and Tilly and Charlie, who announce their engagement just as Gary, asked by Penny to give a speech, flees the restaurant from nerves. Back at Miranda’s flat Gary decides that whatever song comes on the stereo will be their first dance song, and they practice dancing to MC Hammer’s “U Can’t Touch This”.

Gary orders Miranda and Stevie to make up and they go away on a survival holiday in the Lake District where, sat in a tent in the pouring rain, they thank each other for the support they’ve given each other over the years.

Miranda returns to Gary who presents her with an engagement ring; when he doesn't accompany the gesture with the actual three words, Miranda hesitates, and he realizes that she doesn't trust him and never really had. She asks that he wait for her trust, and he says she could wait for him to be able to open up, but Miranda wonders if Gary will ever truly be able to trust himself in their relationship.

He takes the ring from her finger and, weeping, says he can't be with someone who doesn't trust him, and sets it on the counter, then leaves telling her she knows that this is the right thing for them to do.

== Reception ==
=== Ratings ===
"I Do, But To Who?" was the fourth most popular programme aired on Christmas day in the UK, attracting 8.65 million viewers with an audience share of 30.6%.

=== Critical response ===
Bruce Dessau of Beyond the Joke called the episode a "well-constructed return to form" and said that it had "almost everything" except "actual falling over". Dessau complimented the "nice bit of dancing to MC Hammer" as part of the "memory bank of great Miranda moments". Reviewing both finale specials for Nouse, Liz Tresidder wrote that while the finale "surely didn't disappoint" longtime fans and was "packed with strong, funny moments", the use of the "old trope" of flashbacks to create "fluffy filler" was "a little disappointing". However, she praised the "honesty" of the final two episodes and Hart's "truly impressive acting", opining that "just like her character, Miranda Hart has seemingly matured too".
