= Just the Job =

Just the Job may refer to one of the following television sitcom episodes:

- "Just the Job" (Miranda), also known as "Job", 2009
- "Just the Job" (No Place Like Home), 1984
- "Just the Job" (The Upper Hand), 1990
