= Charles Venn =

British actor (born 1973)

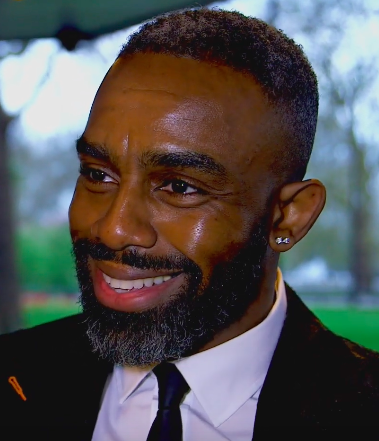
- Venn in 2019
- Born: 24 June 1973 (age 53); Queen's Park, London, England
- Occupation: Actor

Charles Okechukwu O. Venn (born 24 June 1973), formerly known by the stage names Chucky Venice and Chucky Venn, is a British actor, most notable for his roles as Ray Dixon for 109 episodes of EastEnders (2012–2013), and as nurse/paramedic Jacob Masters in 318 episodes of Casualty (2015-present).

Other credits include Dream Team and Footballers' Wives. In 2018, he competed in Strictly Come Dancing.

== Early life ==
Born in Queen's Park, London, he grew up on the Mozart estate, which was at the time a notorious inner-London sink estate. As a boy his passion was for athletics. He attended West London College [formerly Ealing, Hammersmith and West London College] studying performing arts.

== Career ==
Venn took a variety of roles as a jobbing actor, using the surname Venice. He got his big break in 2002 when he was cast as Curtis Alexander in the footballing drama Dream Team (2002-2005), on the satellite channel Sky One. Initially only contracted to appear in two episodes, he became part of the regular cast, appearing in 98 episodes in all until the character was killed off in 2005.

Venn moved to another football drama the following year, appearing as the cuckolded 'alpha male' Tremaine Gidigbi in the final series of Footballers' Wives (2006).

In late 2006, Venn landed a role as Warren in the horror film sequel Return to House on Haunted Hill (2007), he also appeared as Walter in Wrong Turn 3: Left for Dead (2009), and as Agent Hammond in Bourne Ultimatum (2007), and as a bodyguard of one of the film's main villains, Gambol in The Dark Knight. Venn guest starred in an episode of the series Little Miss Jocelyn (2008), and appeared in the third season of Kathy Griffin: My Life on the D-List.

He appeared in the play The Brothers by Angie Le Mar at the Hackney Empire for several short runs from 2005. It was televised by MTV Base in March 2009 with Venn, MC Harvey and Jason Barrett in the line-up.

Venn joined the cast of BBC One soap EastEnders in the role of Ray Dixon, the biological father of Morgan Butcher (Devon Higgs), from 2012 to 2013 for 109 episodes. He played a firefighter in the 2014 Christmas Special: I Do, But to Who? in the TV series Miranda.

On 18 July 2015, Venn joined BBC One's medical drama Casualty as nurse Jacob Masters. He became a series regular for 12 years, appearing in 318 episodes (to April 2026).

In January 2018, Venn participated in And They're Off! in aid of Sport Relief. On 21 August 2018, Venn was announced as the fourteenth celebrity to join the Strictly Come Dancing line up of 2018. He was partnered with professional dancer Karen Clifton and they finished in 6th place.

== Partial filmography (TV & Film) ==
- Dream Team (TV series) (2002-2005) Curtis Alexander
- Footballers' Wives (2006) Tremaine Gidigbi
- The Dark Knight (2008) - Gambol's Bodyguard #1
- Wrong Turn 3: Left for Dead (2009) - Walter
- EastEnders (2011-2013) Ray Dixon - 109 episodes
- Miranda (2014)
- Moving On (Series#6) (2014) Eddie Jackson - 1 episode
- Casualty (2015-present)

== Awards and nominations ==
| Year | Award | Category | Work | Result | Ref. |
|---|---|---|---|---|---|
| 2012 | TV Choice Awards | Best Soap Newcomer | EastEnders | Nominated | |
| 2012 | Inside Soap Awards | Best Newcomer | EastEnders | Nominated | |
| 2012 | Inside Soap Awards | Sexiest Male | EastEnders | Nominated | |
| 2013 | The British Soap Awards | Sexiest Male | EastEnders | Nominated | |
| 2019 | Inside Soap Awards | Best Drama Star | Casualty | Nominated | |
| 2021 | Inside Soap Awards | Best Drama Star | Casualty | Nominated | |
| 2022 | 27th National Television Awards | Drama Performance | Casualty | Nominated | |
