= Jeremy Gane =

- Born: May 29, 1948; Yorkshire, England, UK
- Occupation(s): Tour leader, Mountain Climbing expert, Director of Gane and Marshall

Jeremy Gane, is the managing director of Gane and Marshall International Ltd, a fully licensed tour operator specialising in East Africa mountain climbs. He is also the co-founder of Charity Challenge, Community Challenge and a trustee and secretary for the charity Community Projects Africa. Along with this, he is a member of the High Altitude Medicine Society.

== Early career ==
Jeremy Gane worked as a restorer of antique clocks and watches for many years, before he first climbed Kilimanjaro in 1991. During this trip, he fell in love with both Africa and the experience of travelling. This propelled him to change careers, resulting in his founding of the travel company Gane and Marshall.

== Kilimanjaro ==
Gane has climbed Kilimanjaro 22 times. His company Gane and Marshall is now recognized as a leading specialist in East African mountain climbing and visits Kilimanjaro regularly. Gane and Marshall was responsible for pioneering a new route for climbing up the mountain, which goes via the remote northern flank.

=== The BT Red Nose Climb 2009 ===
Jeremy was the project manager and a guide for the Celebrity Climb of Kilimanjaro for Red Nose Day 2009. Acting as part of Charity Challenge, he led nine British celebrities to the summit of Africa's highest mountain in aid of Comic Relief. These celebrities were Gary Barlow, Ronan Keating, Chris Moyles, Ben Shephard, Cheryl Cole, Kimberley Walsh, Denise Van Outen, Fearne Cotton, and Alesha Dixon.

The climb commenced on 1 March 2009 with all nine celebrities reaching the summit almost a week later on Saturday 7 March 2009. The group worked together through tough conditions, injury and altitude sickness to successfully raise over £3.5 million for charity. Jeremy says "I have climbed the mountain 21 times and I have never met a more spirited, determined and humorous group who were determined to reach their goal from the outset. When the going got tough their camaraderie was unbelievable" about the groups efforts to reach the summit.

This climb was as much a success for Jeremy Gane as it was for the nine celebrities who took part as he had spent months dedicated to organising the climb which needed a crew of around 180.

== Charity Challenge ==
In 1991, Gane was leading a group of charity trekkers up Kilimanjaro (15 years and 15 climbs since that first trip) when he became friendly with one of the participants – Simon Albert. Together, they started to organize and lead trips to various African countries together. The friendship and collaboration eventually led to the creation of yet another company in 1999 - Charity Challenge. The pair also established Community Challenge.

== Other projects ==
Gane has initiated a number of charity projects through the company Community Challenge. In 2004 he became a trustee and secretary for the charity Community Projects Africa (formally Friends of Tanzania), a charity that was founded in 2003 and which supports projects to aid impoverished people living in East and South Africa. Jeremy helps run the charity as a volunteer. Since 2003 the charity has funded and managed irrigation projects, school buildings, aids education awareness programmes, and a vocational training centre.

Jeremy Gane has also established the website Kilimanjaro Climbs to aid those needing help and advice when looking to climb Kilimanjaro.
