= Red Nose Day 2011 =

Fundraising event organised by Comic Relief

- Also known as: Red Nose Day 2011: Do Something Funny for Money
- Genre: Telethon
- Presented by: Lenny Henry; Michael McIntyre; Claudia Winkleman; Graham Norton; Davina McCall; Jonathan Ross; Jimmy Carr; Alan Carr; Jack Whitehall; Kevin Bridges; Dermot O' Leary
- Country of origin: United Kingdom
- Original language: English

Production
- Executive producer: Richard Curtis
- Production location: BBC Television Centre
- Camera setup: Multiple
- Running time: 540 minutes

Original release
- Network: BBC One, BBC Two
- Release: 18 March – 19 March 2011

Related
- Red Nose Day 2009; Red Nose Day 2013; Let's Dance for Comic Relief

Red Nose Day 2011 was a fundraising event organised by Comic Relief. There was a live telethon broadcast on BBC One and BBC Two from the evening of 18 March 2011 to early the following morning as well as a number of run-up events. The theme for the Red Nose Day 2011 invited fund-raisers to "Do Something Funny For Money".

== Results ==
Donations to Comic Relief's Red Nose Day 2011 reached £74,360,207, the largest total reached on the night in the event's 23-year history. Comic Relief co-founder Richard Curtis said: "This is more than we ever believed we would raise. The generosity of the British public is staggering."

BT handled 765,777 calls to the donation line during the live TV show. These reached a peak of 268 calls per second (16,080 calls per minute) at 21.50pm. BT coordinated around 10,000 volunteers at 129 call centres across the UK.

The sum for the 13th Red Nose Day includes:

- £10,030,984 raised so far by Sainsbury's, itself the biggest single donation ever received on the night of Red Nose Day.
- £1,375,037 raised by the nine Red Nose Desert Trekkers (Ronni Ancona, Craig David, Lorraine Kelly, Scott Mills, Olly Murs, Dermot O'Leary, Nadia Sawalha, Kara Tointon and Peter White) who all completed a 108 kilometre trek across the Kaisut Desert in northern Kenya.
- £3,165,705 raised by Radio 1: £543,284 of this was raised in support of Scott Mills and the Desert Trekkers; and the remaining £2,622,421 was raised by Chris Moyles and Comedy Dave Vitty in their record breaking 52-hour marathon radio broadcast.

The Government's Department for International Development (DFID) will match Comic Relief's commitment to spend £10 million improving health and education across Africa.

Red Nose Day typically raises many millions more than the amount raised on the night. Further donations will continue to be received, and the films shown will start to generate income themselves as many of the sketches are available for purchase and download from iTunes.

== Before main event ==
=== Documentaries ===
==== The BT Red Nose Desert Trek ====
The BT Red Nose Desert Trek saw Craig David, Ronni Ancona, Lorraine Kelly, Scott Mills, Olly Murs, Dermot O'Leary, Nadia Sawalha, Kara Tointon and Peter White traverse 100 kilometres (62 mi) in the Kaisut Desert in five days with temperatures reaching up to 100 °F (38 °C). It was broadcast on 17 March 2011. During the Red Nose Day evening, it was announced that £1,375,037 was raised by completing the trek.

==== Comic Relief: Girl On Wire ====
Helen Skelton traversed a 200 feet (61 m) high tight rope between two towers at Battersea Power Station. She became the first ever British woman to walk a tightrope this high. During the Red Nose Day evening, it was announced Helen's traverse raised £253,789 for Comic Relief.

==== Famous, Rich and in the Slums ====
Famous, Rich and in the Slums, a two-part documentary for Red Nose Day followed Lenny Henry, Samantha Womack, Angela Rippon and Reggie Yates as they were left alone for a week to live, work and survive in one of the most impoverished places on earth – the slums of Kibera, Kenya.

=== Television and radio ===
==== 24 Hour Panel People ====
From midday to midday on 5–6 March, a marathon panel show, titled 24 Hour Panel People, was broadcast live over the official website. The event took in a succession of popular programmes, with David Walliams a constant presence for the whole 24 hours, taking on various roles. The full list of panel shows are listed below:

Show	Show Name	Host	Walliams' role	Special Guests & Notes
1	Would I Lie to You?	Rob Brydon regular	Panellist	Team captains: regulars David Mitchell and Lee Mack. Other panellists with Walliams: Shappi Khorsandi, Fay Ripley and Claudia Winkleman
2	8 out of 10 Cats	Jimmy Carr regular	Captain	Other team captain: Sean Lock regular. Panellists: Jamelia, Josh Widdicombe, Jon Richardson and Victoria Coren.
3	Just a Minute	Nicholas Parsons regular	Panellist	Other panellists with Walliams: Lee Mack, Sheila Hancock and Tony Hawks.
4	It's Only TV...But I Like It	Jack Dee former team captain	Panellist	Team captains: Ulrika Jonsson and Charlie Brooker. Other panellists with Walliams: Danny Wallace, Tom Deacon and Penny Smith.
5	The Generation Game	Vernon Kay	Team member	Team 1: Walliams with his mother Kathleen. Team 2: Miranda Hart and Patricia Hodge, who play mother and daughter in the sitcom Miranda.
6	Through the Keyhole	David Frost regular	Panellist	Other panellists with Walliams: David Tennant and Patricia Hodge. Dawn Porter was the guide. The celebrity whose house was shown was Ann Widdecombe.
7	Blankety Blank	Paul O'Grady (this time as himself, having only done so before as Lily Savage)	Panellist	Other panellists with Walliams: Barbara Windsor, David Tennant, George Lamb, Keith Harris and Orville and Stacey Solomon, with Lee Ryan and Duncan James from Blue playing as contestants.
8	Mock the Week	Dara Ó Briain regular	Panellist	Other panellists with Walliams: regular Andy Parsons with guests: Andrew Maxwell, Daniel Sloss, Doc Brown and Seann Walsh.
9	Celebrity Juice	Keith Lemon regular	Panellist	Other panellists with Walliams: regulars Rufus Hound and Jedward with guests Germaine Greer and Lauren Laverne.
10	Argumental	David Walliams	Host	Team captains: regulars Rufus Hound and Marcus Brigstocke. Guests: Dara Ó Briain and Jo Brand. During the show it was announced that Walliams had done 12 hours.
11	QI	Stephen Fry regular	Panellist	Other panellists with Walliams: Russell Tovey, Jo Brand and Sue Perkins.
12	They Think It's All Over	Nick Hancock original host	Panellist	Team captains: former regular Lee Hurst and Phil Tufnell. Other panellists with Walliams: Dave Berry, Gabby Logan and Richard Bacon.
13	Call My Bluff	Angus Deayton	Panellist	Other panellists with Walliams: Alex Horne, Roisin Conaty, Russell Tovey, Tim Key and Sarah Cawood.
14	Give Us a Clue	Sara Cox	Panellist	Guests with Walliams include: Christopher Biggins, Lionel Blair, Una Stubbs, Holly Walsh and Jenni Falconer.
15	What's My Line?	Stephen K. Amos	Guest	Other guests with Walliams: Christopher Biggins and Holly Walsh.
16	Mastermind	Griff Rhys Jones	Contestant	Other contestants with Walliams: Adam Woodyatt
17	Have I Got News for You	Patrick Kielty	Panellist	Other panellists with Walliams: Clive Anderson, Lembit Öpik and Holly Walsh.
18	Whose Line Is It Anyway?	Clive Anderson regular	Panellist	Other panellists with Walliams: Humphrey Ker with regular members Josie Lawrence, Neil Mullarkey and Tony Slattery
19	Never Mind the Buzzcocks	David Walliams	Host	Panellists: Alexa Chung, Chris O'Dowd, Matt Edmondson, Robert Webb, Neil Tennant and Nick Grimshaw.

Room 101, with Nick Hancock returning as host after 14 years, was originally supposed to have come between They Think It's All Over and Call My Bluff, but was axed after the show ran behind. Paul Merton was advertised to reprise his role as regular team captain on Have I Got News For You but due to illness was replaced by Clive Anderson. Jason Manford was advertised to host Have I Got News For You, but for unknown reasons did not appear at all and was replaced by Patrick Kielty.

On Friday 25 March 2011 a one-hour-long highlight's show of the marathon was broadcast on BBC One. The highlights show included clips of selected games: Would I Lie to You, Just a Minute, The Generation Game, Through the Keyhole, Blankety Blank, QI, Whose Line Is It Anyway? and Never Mind the Buzzcocks, some backstage film, and two of the Comic Relief appeal films – Ruth Jones on senile dementia home respite, and David Tennant in a Ugandan hospital.

==== BBC Radio 1's Longest Show Ever with Chris Moyles and Comedy Dave for Comic Relief ====
On 16 March 2011 at 6:30am GMT, Chris Moyles and Comedy Dave began their challenge – BBC Radio 1's Longest Show Ever with Chris Moyles and Comedy Dave for Comic Relief. Originally the challenge was to attempt to broadcast for more than 37 hours to break the record for the longest show in BBC Radio 1's history, set by Simon Mayo in 1999. On the day of the challenge starting, the team announced they would attempt to set a brand new Guinness World Record for 'Radio DJ Endurance Marathon (Team)' – aiming to broadcast for 52 hours. At 19:30 GMT on 17 March 2011 (37 hours into the challenge), the BBC Radio 1 record was beaten and had raised £1,009,033 until that point. The world record was beaten at 08:30 on 18 March 2011. A total of £2,406,648 was announced at 10:19 (raising almost £1.1m over the previous two hours).

Just prior to the final total, Fearne Cotton promised to spend the last twenty minutes of the 52-hour marathon in a swimsuit if the final total was £2,000,000 or more. As this goal had been reached, Fearne wore a black and white striped swimming costume. The number of users trying to view the studio webcam caused the Radio 1 website to crash. The station's Twitter feed jokingly acknowledged the issue, and reminded listeners that the Red Button feed was still running. In the evening on 18 March 2011, the total amount raised by Chris and Dave was £2,622,421. With a final total of £2,821,831.

On 23 March 2011, it was confirmed that an average of 2.84 million people watched the broadcast via the Red Button Interactive Service for an average of 144 minutes each.

On 18 November 2011, their record was broken by a breakfast show on the German station 98.8 KISS FM Berlin, when presenters Nora Neise and Tolga Akar were on air for 73 hours.

===== Schedule =====
	Slot	Supporting BBC Radio 1 DJ	Special Guests	Notes	Iconic Totals
Day 1	Wed 06:30 – 10:00	The Chris Moyles Show Team	Gino D'Acampo	Gino played Car Park Catchphrase.	£33,502 (08:26)
Day 1	Wed 10:00 – 12:45	Fearne Cotton	The Wanted	Live Lounge performance by The Wanted	£56,655 (10:26) £68,596 (11:26) £76,317 (12:26)
Day 1	Wed 13:00 – 16:00	Greg James	Richard Madeley; Phillip Schofield		£86,890 (13:30)
Day 1	Wed 16:00 – 19:00	Scott Mills	Edith Bowman; Paul O'Grady	The team played Innuendo Bingo. (Newsbeat Break @ 17:45)	£116,139 (16:35) £157,704 (17:40) £179,950 (18:25)
Day 1	Wed 19:00 – 21:00	MistaJam	Chipmunk		£212,189 (19:26) £227,527 (20:25)
Day 1	Wed 21:00 – 22:00	Vernon Kay	Jimmy Carr	At 9:00pm, Chris Moyles did a live link on BBC One, fourteen and a half hours into the marathon. This was followed by a surprise outside broadcast by Greg James from the top of the BT Tower. The giant LED screen that wraps around the top of the tower then displayed good luck animations in support of the record attempt.	£268,900 (21:35)
Day 1	Wed 22:00 – 00:00	Nick Grimshaw	Fearne Cotton (by phone); Katy B Shane Richie; Lily Allen; Kelly Osbourne (by phone)		£291,858 (23:10)
Day 1	Thurs 00:00 – 02:00	The Chris Moyles Show Team	Davina McCall		
Day 1	Thurs 02:00 – 04:00	Benji B		both Chris and Dave took a break each, as well as attempting to mix tracks with Benji.	
Day 1	Thurs 04:00 – 06:30	Dev	Clive Warren, former Radio 1 DJ (by phone); Jude Adam Mason, Early Bit BA (by phone)	Included highlights from the Early Bit when Chris was on that slot when he first joined BBC Radio 1 in 1997.	
Day 2	Thurs 06:30 – 10:00	The Chris Moyles Show team	Andi Peters; Sara Cox; Jon Culshaw; Tim Westwood; Claudia Winkleman	Claudia played Carpark Catchphrase	£335,474 (06:30) £374,000 (07:30) £425,425 (08:25) £485,084 (09:25)
Day 2	Thurs 10:00 – 12:45	Fearne Cotton	Craig David; Ricky Gervais	at 10:40am, Chris Moyles, David Vitty, and Fearne Cotton did a live link on ITV's This Morning.	£510,279 (10:40) £550,237 (11:25) £575,566 (12:25)
Day 2	Thurs 13:00 – 16:00	Greg James	Matt Edmondson; Jennie McAlpine; Jack Whitehall	Chris and Dave had a massage with big Steve, whilst Greg played his "How big is your ego" game.	£588,273 (13:25) £641,726 (14:30) £661,428 (15:35)
Day 2	Thurs 16:00 – 19:00	Scott Mills	Olly Murs	Three-way Innuendo Bingo was played between Dave, Olly Murs and Becky.(Newsbeat Break @ 17:45)	£676,943 (16:25)
Day 2	Thurs 19:00 – 21:00	MistaJam	Simon Mayo (former BBC Radio 1 colleague); Maverick Sabre and Chris Moyles Show team	At 19:31 GMT, Chris and Dave became the longest non-stop BBC Radio 1's show, beating Simon Mayo who held the record of 37 hours, set during Red Nose Day 1999. To mark this achievement, the BT Tower was again turned red with the faces of Chris Moyles and Comedy Dave being displayed.	£1,009,033 (19:35)
Day 2	Thurs 21:00 – 22:00	Jaymo and Andy George (As part of "In new DJs we trust")			£1,097,727 (21:35)
Day 2	Thurs 22:00 – 00:00	Nick Grimshaw	Abbey Clancy (by phone); Louis Walsh (by phone); James Corden	Corden performed Hip-Hop Karaoke.	
Day 2	Fri 00:00 – 02:00	Kissy Sell Out	Patrick Kielty; Thandie Newton; Katy Perry	Dave took a break	
Day 2	Fri 02:00 – 04:00	Annie Nightingale		Dave and Chris both took a break.	
Day 2	Fri 04:00 – 06:30	Dev	Zane Lowe	Zane came in shortly after arriving back from his Australian tour, suffering from Jet Lag. Both Chris and Dave took another break	
Day 3	Fri 06:30 – 10:00	The Chris Moyles Show team	Carrie Davis (former Newsbeat sports newsreader) (by phone); Gary Barlow; Ricky Wilson; Jayne Sharp and Chris and Dave's friends and family.	Gary Presented the Guinness World Record Certificate to Chris and Dave shortly after breaking the record	£1,808,424 (08:40)
Day 3	Fri 10:00 – 10:30	Fearne Cotton		Guinness World record for the longest marathon radio DJ (team) show extension. Cotton appeared in a swimming costume, causing the BBC Radio 1 website to crash.	£2,406,648 (10:19)

==== Comic Relief does Glee Club ====
On 14 March on BBC One, CBBC created a show for the charity called Comic Relief does Glee Club which lets a group perform music in three varieties (choir, musical theatre and contemporary). The Grand Final and Comic Relief does Glee Club 2011 trophy was won by top choir Soul Mates, fifteen children from south-east and east London who go to Step Up Music Theatre School.

==== Let's Dance for Comic Relief ====
A series of Let's Dance for Comic Relief was broadcast between 19 February and 12 March. It was won by Charlie Baker and James Thornton.

==== Other celebrity support ====
Lord Prescott read the Shipping Forecast on BBC Radio 4 to raise money for Comic Relief on Saturday 19 March 2011 at approximately 0:48. Comic duo Ant & Dec's Big Red Nose Broadcast aired on 14 March 2011. They appeared on various television shows and radio broadcasts to raise money for this year's appeal, and took items to be auctioned off for charity.

=== British Industry ===
==== Walkers crisps ====
Snack food manufacturer, Walkers created four new crisps flavours for Comic Relief 2011. Each flavour is named after a British comedian; Frank Skinner's Roast Dinner, Jimmy Con Carrne, Steak and Al Pie and Stephen Fry Up.

==== British Airways ====
British Airways set a new Guinness World Record for hosting the 'highest stand-up comedy gig in the world' with Dara Ó Briain, Jack Whitehall and Jon Richardson for Red Nose Day. The airline raised £800,747 for Comic Relief through its charity partnership 'Flying Start'.

==== Music ====
The Wanted released the official comic relief 2011 single "Gold Forever" on 13 March. Other Comic Relief singles include George Michael's cover of the 1987 song "True Faith" by New Order and the Take That song "Happy Now" featuring Take That and Fake That consisting of David Walliams, James Corden, John Bishop, Alan Carr and Catherine Tate. Also Geraldine McQueen & Susan Boyle "I Know Him So Well"; the song has been expanded to overseas sales which will likely increase the output to Comic Relief.

=== Celebrity auctions ===
More than a hundred celebrities were involved in "Twit Relief", an event on Twitter.

=== Other events ===
==== Sack racing ====
On 9 March 2011, the London Shoreditch crowd wore sacks as they took part in the world's first night-time, over-18s sack racing event at Village Underground. Sponsored by drinks brand, Cafédirect, it also featured live music, comedy and DJs. Music was provided by Dog is Dead, CockNBullKid and Roll Deep. Pre- and post-race DJ sets came from T4's Jameela Jamil, Gavin and Stacey star Mat Horne, BBC 1Xtra DJ Gemma Cairney, Professor Green's tour DJ DJ IQ, back to back with his lead vocalist Tom Jules and Greg Leigh. The sack race contenders included a host of famous faces, overseen by former The Apprentice contender, James McQuillan. There was also a retro raffle, and photo booth. The cost was £5 with all profits going to Comic Relief.

== Main event ==
=== Impact of international events on Red Nose Day 2011 ===
At the beginning of the show Claudia Winkleman and Michael McIntyre mentioned that although Comic Relief were not currently aiding victims of the 2011 Tōhoku earthquake and tsunami, they were monitoring the situation. Davina McCall and Graham Norton revealed in their section of the show that due to the current events, the previously scheduled 10.30pm BBC News would air in its normal slot of 10.00pm and that as planned the show would continue on BBC Two between 10.00pm and 10.35pm, unlike the previously scheduled 10.30pm – 11.05pm slot.

=== Presenters ===
Times approximate:

Time	Presenters
19:00 – 20:05	Lenny Henry, Claudia Winkleman and Michael McIntyre
20:05 – 21:10	Graham Norton and Davina McCall
21:10 – 22:00	Dermot O'Leary and Davina McCall
22:00 – 23:10	Lenny Henry and Fearne Cotton
23:10 – 00:40	Jonathan Ross, Claudia Winkleman and Jimmy Carr
00:40 – 02:15	Alan Carr, Fearne Cotton, Claudia Winkleman and Davina McCall
02:15 – 04:00	Jack Whitehall and Kevin Bridges

==== Appeal Film Presenters ====
Lenny Henry, Jack Dee, David Tennant, Steve Jones, Russell Brand and Ruth Jones all presented appeal films. Davina McCall and Lenny Henry also provided voiceovers for most of the films.

==== Thank Yous ====
Tom Fletcher & Danny Jones, Reggie Yates, Jon Culshaw (impersonating Jeremy Clarkson and Ross Kemp) and Debra Stephenson (impersonating Davina McCall) presented thank you messages for companies who pledged large amounts of money to the appeal. These included Sainsbury's for making the largest ever corporate cheque to Comic Relief (£10 million); Ryman for selling Red Nose Day pens; Walkers for their four charity crisp flavours and BT for making it possible to answer calls to the donation line, 03457 910 910.

=== Sketches and features ===
Title	Brief description	Starring
Opening titles	Adapting clips taken from the film The King's Speech, Lenny Henry heckles a stuttering King George VI to hurry up and introduce the show.	Lenny Henry and Colin Firth
Outnumbered	A special version of the show.	Hugh Dennis, Tyger Drew-Honey, Daniel Roche, Ramona Marquez and Andy Murray
Doctor Who	A special episode of the show, in which the TARDIS emergency-lands in the safest place for it to do so: within itself.	Matt Smith, Karen Gillan and Arthur Darvill
Harry Hill's TV Burp	Harry Hill is a roving reporter on an episode of Autumnwatch.	Harry Hill, Kate Humble, Chris Packham, The Wanted, Olly Murs, Ronnie Corbett, Bill Oddie and Alex Jones
MasterChef	Miranda Hart, Claudia Winkleman and Ruby Wax cook for Prime Minister David Cameron in No.10 Downing Street with Michel Roux, Jr. and Monica Galetti.	David Cameron, Miranda Hart, Claudia Winkleman, Ruby Wax, Michel Roux, Jr., Monica Galetti, India Fisher, Gregg Wallace and John Torode
Uptown Downstairs Abbey	A two-part spoof of Downton Abbey and Upstairs Downstairs.	Jennifer Saunders, Joanna Lumley, Simon Callow, Victoria Wood, Harry Enfield, Kim Cattrall, Dale Winton, Olivia Colman, Patrick Barlow and Kim Woodburn
EastEnders	A special episode of the show demonstrating the serious issues of sexual exploitation, following the storyline featuring Whitney Dean.	Charlie Brooks, Jacqueline Jossa, Shona McGarty and Jody Latham
Graham Norton's Chair Game	Graham Norton hosts his The Chair Game from The Graham Norton Show in which celebrities tell stories and if it is boring they get ejected from the chair.	Graham Norton, Kirstie Allsopp, Thandie Newton and Richard Bacon
Ant and Dec's Big Red Nose Broadcast	Ant and Dec get on as many TV shows as they can within 24 hours to steal something from the set and auction it off.	Anthony McPartlin, Declan Donnelly, Christine Bleakley, Adrian Chiles, Kate Garraway, Holly Willoughby, Phillip Schofield, Phil Vickery, Alan Titchmarsh, Kate Thornton, Jenny Eclair, Johnny Vaughan and others
Miranda	The team take over the Pineapple Dance Studios.	Miranda Hart, Patricia Hodge, Sarah Hadland, Tom Ellis with special guests Louie Spence, Andrew Stone, Heather Small and JLS
The Choir	TV's best-known chefs go into training to become the choir.	Gareth Malone, Rick Astley, Ainsley Harriott, Antony Worrall Thompson, Nancy Lam, Rosemary Shrager, Gary Rhodes and Rusty Lee and others
Smithy	Comic Relief is at crisis point and the only man who can save the day is Smithy.	James Corden, George Michael, Lenny Henry, Richard Curtis, Rupert Grint, Claire Balding, JLS, Dermot O'Leary, Sir Paul McCartney, Davina McCall, Lord Coe, Tom Felton, Gordon Brown, Roger Lloyd-Pack, Rio Ferdinand, Keira Knightley, Richard Madeley, Tom Daley, Justin Bieber, Ringo Starr and Robert Winston
The Inbetweeners Rude Road Trip	The Inbetweeners boys trek across the country to find the rudest places in their rudest road trip.	Simon Bird, Joe Thomas, James Buckley and Blake Harrison
Alan Partridge	Alan Partridge hosts his Mid Morning Matters radio show with a Comic Relief theme.	Steve Coogan and Tim Key
An Idiot's Appeal	Ricky Gervais, Stephen Merchant and Karl Pilkington discuss Comic Relief and charity, comedy sketch.	Ricky Gervais, Stephen Merchant and Karl Pilkington
Armstrong and Miller	A spoof of Blue Peter as we find out why the pair will not be able to join the show tonight.	Ben Miller and Alexander Armstrong with Jessica Ransom
Rude Tube	A music video spoof of "Empire State of Mind" about Newport, Wales, featuring some of Wales's most famous media stars. Plus a special normal episode presented by Alex Zane.	Alex Zane, Gethin Jones, Steve Jones, Connie Fisher, Joe Calzaghe, Robbie Savage, Ruth Madoc, Sian Lloyd, Bonnie Tyler, Alex Jones, Paul Whitehouse, John Humphrys, Colin Jackson, Anneka Rice, Goldie Lookin Chain, Josie D'Arby, Helen Adams, Imogen Thomas, Mathew Pritchard, Lee Dainton, Tim Vincent, Lacey Banghard and others
Angry Boys	A short preview of the new comedy series Angry Boys.	Chris Lilley
24 Hour Panel People	Highlights of 24 hours of comedy panel shows.	David Walliams, David Mitchell, Danny Wallace, Jimmy Carr, Miranda Hart, Barbara Windsor, Paul O'Grady, Jedward, Keith Lemon, Stephen Fry, Dara Ó Briain, Nick Hancock, Lionel Blair, Angus Deayton, Richard Curtis, Sara Cox, Nick Grimshaw, Alexa Chung and others
Misery Bear with Kate Moss	Sketch about the day in the life with Misery Bear.	Kate Moss

==== Jack and Kevin's Comic Relief Lock In ====
Tonight's compilation hosted by Jack Whitehall and Kevin Bridges features clips from The Morgana Show, The One Ronnie, Miranda, The Inbetweeners, Newswipe Misery Bear and Armstrong and Miller, plus a special sketch from Peter Dickson. The audience included Marcus Akin.

=== Musical Performances ===
Artist	Song	Notes
The Wanted	"Gold Forever"	The official Comic Relief song for this year.
Take That	"Happy Now"	
Adele	"Someone Like You"	
JLS feat Miranda Hart	"Eyes Wide Shut"	Miranda covers Tinie Tempah's verse and is joined by backup dancers Patricia Hodge, Sarah Hadland and Tom Ellis
Gareth Malone & Rick Astley	"Never Gonna Give You Up"	The choir featured Ainsley Harriott, Antony Worrall Thompson, Nancy Lam, Rosemary Shrager, Gary Rhodes and Rusty Lee
Elbow	"Open Arms"	
Annie Lennox	"Universal Child"	
The Axis of Awesome	Medley of Pop Songs	A variation of their "Four Chords" song
Gareth Malone & Rick Astley	"Never Forget"	Featuring Ainsley Harriott, Antony Worrall Thompson, Nancy Lam, Rosemary Shrager, Gary Rhodes, Rusty Lee, Jimmy Carr, Alex Jones, Alan Carr, Helen Skelton, Lenny Henry, Kirstie Allsop, Andy Akinwolere, Fearne Cotton, Claudia Winkleman

=== Music Videos ===
Artist	Song	Notes
The Wanted	"Gold Forever"	Short promotional clip
Geraldine McQueen & Susan Boyle	"I Know Him So Well"	Peter Kay stars as Geraldine
Take That	"Happy Now"	Fake That features David Walliams, Catherine Tate, James Corden, Alan Carr and John Bishop
George Michael	"True Faith"	Introduced by James Corden as 'Smithy'
Josie d'Arby, Steve Jones, Paul Whitehouse, Siân Lloyd, Connie Fisher, John Humphrys, Gethin Jones, Helen Lederer, Robbie Savage, Anneka Rice, Ruth Madoc, Tim Vincent, Howard Marks, Gareth Jones, Lisa Rogers, Helen Adams, Max Boyce, Joe Calzaghe, Dirty Sanchez, Wynne Evans, Goldie Lookin Chain, Colin Jackson, Grant Nicholas, Shakin' Stevens, Michael Sheen, Imogen Thomas, Bonnie Tyler, Alex Jones and Ian Woosnam.	"Newport"	A parody version of "Empire State of Mind"

== Donation progress ==
=== 18 March 2011 ===
The Desert Trek total was £1,375,037. Helen Skelton raised £253,789. Sainsbury's raised £10,030,984, the single biggest cheque that Comic Relief had received by that date (Sainsbury's broke their own record in 2013). TK Maxx raised £3,000,112. Maltesers raised £1,101,807. BT raised £353,802. Walkers raised £1,200,038. British Airways raised £800,747. Chris Moyles and Comedy Dave raised £2,600,000 for their 52 Hour Radio Marathon. Ryman raised £385,198

Time	Amount	Large donations
20:05 GMT	£5,797,110	BT, Helen Skelton, Red Nose Desert Trek
21:09 GMT	£26,653,281	Let's Dance for Comic Relief, Maltesers, TK Maxx
21:58 GMT	£41,873,505	£10 million by Sainsbury's

=== 19 March 2011 ===
Time	Amount	Large Donations
00:37 GMT	£68,669,557	Walkers, British Airways, Ryman, BBC Radio, Kellogg's
02:09 GMT	£74,360,207	
