= 12 in a Box =

2007 British independent comedy film

- Film poster
- Directed by: John McKenzie
- Written by: John McKenzie
- Produced by: Bruce Windwood
- Starring: Kenneth Collard; Miranda Hart; Belle Hithersay; Anjella Mackintosh; Glynne Steele; Katy Wix
- Production company: Masses Entertainment
- Distributed by: Cinevolve
- Release date: September 2007 (Zurich)
- Running time: 93 minutes
- Country: United Kingdom
- Language: English

12 in a Box is a 2007 British independent comedy film written and directed by John McKenzie. The film premiered at the 2007 Zurich Film Festival.

== Plot ==
12 in a Box sees twelve people attend what they think is a school reunion lunch but when they get there they discover that, as part of the last wish of a dead classmate, they will inherit £1,000,000 each if they can all stay together in the house for 96 hours. With one of the participants due to be married and another dropping stone dead on the first day, they have their work cut out to go the distance.

== Release ==
The film was given a limited European release in 2007 and had its US premiere in Boston in 2009. Despite being a British film with some notable names in the cast, it was not released in the UK until March 2013.

The DVD was released in 2013 marketed under Miranda Hart's name due to her recent fame. However, Hart only makes a brief appearance, her screen time totalling 5 minutes.

== Critical response ==
The film received the Audience Award at the 2007 Zurich Film Festival, Indie Spirit Best Storyline Award at the 2009 Boston International Film Festival and the Best Film Award at the 2009 LA British Film Festival. The LA Campus Circle graded the film A− and called it "smart, funny and surprising without being pretentious or hackneyed. There are few dull moments, and it actually succeeds in pulling off the twists." The film was also praised by The Film Review and CineVue. The Guardian, however, gave it a poor review, as did the Radio Times and the Daily Express.
