= Red Nose Day 2009 =

Fundraising event organised by Comic Relief

- Also known as: Red Nose Day 2009: Do Something Funny for Money
- Genre: Telethon
- Presented by: David Tennant; Davina McCall; Jonathan Ross; Claudia Winkleman; Fearne Cotton; Reggie Yates; Noel Fielding; Fern Britton; Alan Carr; Graham Norton; James Corden; Mathew Horne
- Country of origin: United Kingdom

Production
- Executive producer: Richard Curtis
- Production location: BBC Television Centre
- Camera setup: Multiple
- Running time: 8 hours 45 minutes (525 minutes)

Original release
- Network: BBC One, BBC Two
- Release: 13 March – 14 March 2009

Related
- Red Nose Day 2007: The Big One; Red Nose Day 2011; Let's Dance for Comic Relief; Comic Relief Does The Apprentice

Red Nose Day 2009 was a fund-raising event organised by Comic Relief, broadcast live on BBC One and BBC Two from the evening of 13 March 2009 to early the following morning. It was part of the "Do Something Funny For Money" campaign. It was held on Friday 13 March till Saturday 14 March 2009 from 7:00 pm to 3:45 am on BBC One.

== Presenters ==
Time	Presenters
19.00-20.40	David Tennant and Davina McCall
20.40-22.00	Jonathan Ross and Claudia Winkleman
22.00-22.35	Fearne Cotton, Reggie Yates and Noel Fielding
22.35-01.00	Fern Britton and Alan Carr
01.00-02.10	Graham Norton
02.10-03.45	James Corden and Mathew Horne

== Donation Progress ==
=== 13 March 2009 ===
The Mount Kilimanjaro total was £3,500,000. The Wine Relief total was £750,000. A notable, single donation of £6,000,000 was donated by an anonymous donor. £501,863 was raised by Ryman. Foxybingo.com raised £150,000. Subway managed to raise £407,763.

Time	Amount	Large Donations
19:50 GMT	£3,017,772	
20:29 GMT	£13,667,550	£3.5 million by The BT Red Nose Climb
21:34 GMT	£29,748,187	£9 million by Sainsbury's
21:57 GMT	£32,802,411	
23:25 GMT	£41,799,343	£750,000 by Wine Relief, £6 million by an anonymous donor

=== 14 March 2009 ===
Time	Amount	Large Donations
00:52 GMT	£54,690,437	£407,763 by Subway
02:08 GMT	£57,809,938	
14 March (pm)	£59,187,065	

== Sketches ==
Title	Brief description	Starring
Harry Hill's TV Burp	A special compilation version of the show.	Harry Hill
Two Pints of Lager and a Packet of Crisps, Grownups and Coming of Age	A special crossover episode.	Standard cast of all three shows.
The Royle Family	A special episode of the show.	Standard cast
Outnumbered	A special episode of the show.	Standard cast
The Sarah Jane Adventures	"From Raxacoricofallapatorius with Love", a special episode of the show.	Elisabeth Sladen, Ronnie Corbett, Thomas Knight, Daniel Anthony, Anjli Mohindra
Mastermind	A special episode of the show.	David Tennant, Davina McCall, John Humphrys
Dragons' Den	The Dragons go back to the Victorian era with inventions such as the television, toothbrush and toilet. This was shown in three parts: the first at 8:23, the second at 12:27 am and the final part at 1:06 am. Harry Enfield and Paul Whitehouse star as the Dragons as in their sketch show Harry & Paul, while the real Dragons star as the contestants.	Peter Jones, James Caan. Duncan Bannatyne, Deborah Meaden, Theo Paphitis, Harry Enfield, Paul Whitehouse
Mamma Mia! Spoof	French and Saunders last sketch together.	Dawn French, Jennifer Saunders, Sienna Miller, Joanna Lumley, Matt Lucas, Miranda Hart
Little Britain & Little Britain USA	Catherine Tate appears as Carol Beer's boss.	Catherine Tate, David Walliams, Matt Lucas
Little Britain & Little Britain USA	Robbie Williams appears as Ellie-Grace's friend having a sleepover.	Robbie Williams, David Walliams, Matt Lucas
The Office	Ricky Gervais and Stephen Merchant re-imagine The Office as an opera	Ricky Gervais, Stephen Merchant
Smithy Vs. The England Team	Smithy from Gavin & Stacey teaches the England football team a thing or two.	James Corden, The England Squad
Pub Quiz	Al Murray hosts a pub quiz.	Al Murray
Mitchell and Webb Vs. Armstrong and Miller	The comedy duos join forces.	David Mitchell, Robert Webb, Alexander Armstrong, Ben Miller, Keeley Hawes
Katy Brand	Katy Brand has a very special sketch about Fashion College.	Katy Brand, Sadie Frost and Kate Moss.
You Can Keep Your Hat On	Featuring the cast of Let's Dance for Comic Relief	The Full Monty
Catherine Tate	Nan Receives a Cheque to the People of Jubilee Hall	Catherine Tate, Fern Britton and Alan Carr
Friday Night Comic Relief News	Alan and Fern present a special edition of this feature normally on Alan's "The Sunday Night Project"	Fern Britton and Alan Carr
Stand-up Comedy	Comedy stars perform for Comic Relief	Jason Manford, Omid Djalili and Lenny Henry
Cowboys go Naked	A selection of black and white clips	Unknown
Peter Kay's Raiders of the Pop Charts	The making of Peter Kay's "Is This the Way to Amarillo?" video for 2005's Comic Relief	Peter Kay, Michael Parkinson and Ronnie Corbett

== Musical Performances ==
=== The Show ===
Artist	Song	Notes
The Saturdays	"Just Can't Get Enough"	The official Comic Relief song for this year.
Oasis	"Falling Down"	
Take That	"The Garden"	
Elbow	"Puncture Repair"	
Annie Lennox	"Lean on Me"	
Adele	"Make You Feel My Love"	
The Script	"Heroes"	
Franz Ferdinand	"Ulysses"	

=== Top of the Pops ===
Artist	Song	Notes
Rob Brydon (as Bryn West) & Ruth Jones (as Vanessa Jenkins) with Sir Tom Jones & Robin Gibb	"(Barry) Islands in the Stream"	The second Comic Relief 2009 single.
Franz Ferdinand	"No You Girls"	David Tennant joined in and had a go at 'rockin' out' on guitar.
Oasis	"Falling Down"	Liam Gallagher did not appear on stage.
Take That	"Up All Night"	Ended with red balloons being released from above.
U2	"Get on Your Boots"	Performed from a different studio.
James Morrison	"Broken Strings"	Acoustic version without Nelly Furtado.
Flo Rida	"Right Round"	No Ke$ha. Also, Davina McCall, Claudia Winkleman, Dawn French and Jennifer Saunders were on stage dancing.

BBC Two's special Comic Relief edition of Top of the Pops, drew an impressive 6.73m (31.6%) over 35 minutes.

== Features ==
=== Let's Dance for Comic Relief ===
Best bits from the series so far.

=== Comic Relief Does The Apprentice ===
Pre-recorded final installment.

=== The BT Red Nose Climb ===
The BT Red Nose Climb saw nine celebrities successfully scale 19,330 feet (5,890 m) to reach the summit of Africa's highest mountain to raise money for Comic Relief. On 27 February 2009, Gary Barlow, Ronan Keating, Chris Moyles, Ben Shephard, Cheryl Cole, Kimberley Walsh, Denise Van Outen, Fearne Cotton, and Alesha Dixon set off to Tanzania to tackle Mount Kilimanjaro with project manager and guide Jeremy Gane of Charity Challenge. The Climb has already raised in excess of £3.5 million with over £1.8 million coming from the audience of BBC Radio 1 (a record for the station.) All nine celebrities reached the summit of Mount Kilimanjaro on Saturday, 7 March 2009. Cole, Cotton, van Outen and Shephard reached the summit first at sunrise. On Thursday 12 March 2009 BBC One's 'Kilimanjaro: The Big Red Nose Climb' was seen by 8.74m viewers (36.6% share). British Prime Minister Gordon Brown met with the group upon their return to the United Kingdom and congratulated the "nine heroes" on their achievement, saying that they were "inspiring a generation of kids who would never have thought about these things".

== Cast and Reporters ==
- Adam Clayton
- Adele
- Adrian Chiles
- Al Murray
- Alan Carr
- Alan Sugar
- Alesha Dixon
- Alex Kapranos
- Alexander Armstrong
- Andy Bell
- Anjli Mohindra
- Annie Lennox
- Anthony McPartlin
- Ashley Cole
- Ben Miller
- Ben Shephard
- Bono
- Carol Vorderman
- Caroline Aherne
- Catherine Tate
- Cheryl Cole
- Chris Moyles
- Chris Sharrock
- Christine Bleakley
- Claire Skinner
- Claudia Winkleman
- Craig Cash
- Daniel Anthony
- Daniel Radcliffe
- Daniel Roche
- Danielle Lloyd
- Danny O'Donoghue
- David Baddiel
- David Beckham
- David Mitchell
- David Tennant
- David Walliams
- Davina McCall
- Deborah Meaden
- Declan Donnelly
- Denise van Outen
- Dominic Wood
- Duncan Bannatyne
- The Edge
- Edith Bowman
- Elisabeth Sladen
- Emma Watson
- Ewan McGregor
- Fearne Cotton
- Fern Britton
- Fiona Phillips
- Flo Rida
- Frankie Sandford
- French and Saunders
- Gok Wan
- Gary Barlow
- Gem Archer
- Gerald Ratner
- Graham Norton
- Guy Garvey
- Harry Enfield
- Harry Hill
- Howard Donald
- Hugh Dennis
- Jack Dee
- James Caan
- James Corden
- James Morrison
- Jason Gardiner
- Jason Manford
- Jason Orange
- Jennifer Aniston
- Joanna Lumley
- Jo Brand
- John Terry
- Jonathan Ross
- Kate Moss
- Kathryn Drysdale
- Katy Brand
- Keeley Hawes
- Keith Lemon
- Kimberley Walsh
- Larry Mullen, Jr.
- Lemar
- Lenny Henry
- Louis Walsh
- Margaret Mountford
- Mark Owen
- Mark Potter
- Matt Lucas
- Mathew Horne
- Michael Parkinson
- Michelle Mone
- Miranda Hart
- Mollie King
- Nicholas McCarthy
- Nick Hewer
- Noel Fielding
- Noel Gallagher
- Omid Djalili
- Owen Coyle
- Owen Wilson
- Patsy Palmer
- Paul Thomson
- Paul Whitehouse
- Pete Turner
- Peter Crouch
- Peter Jones
- Ralf Little
- Ramona Marquez
- Reggie Yates
- Richard Jupp
- Richard McCourt
- Ricky Gervais
- Ricky Tomlinson
- Rio Ferdinand
- Rob Brydon
- Robbie Williams
- Robert Hardy
- Robert Webb
- Rochelle Wiseman
- Ronan Keating
- Ronnie Corbett
- Rory Bremner
- Ruby Wax
- Rupert Grint
- Ruth Jones
- Sadie Frost
- Sienna Miller
- Simon Cowell
- Simon Le Bon
- Stephen Merchant
- Steve Jones
- Sue Johnston
- Theo Paphitis
- Thomas Knight
- Tom Jones
- Tyger Drew-Honey
- Una Healy
- Vanessa White
