= Miranda Hart =

English actress, comedian and writer (born 1972)

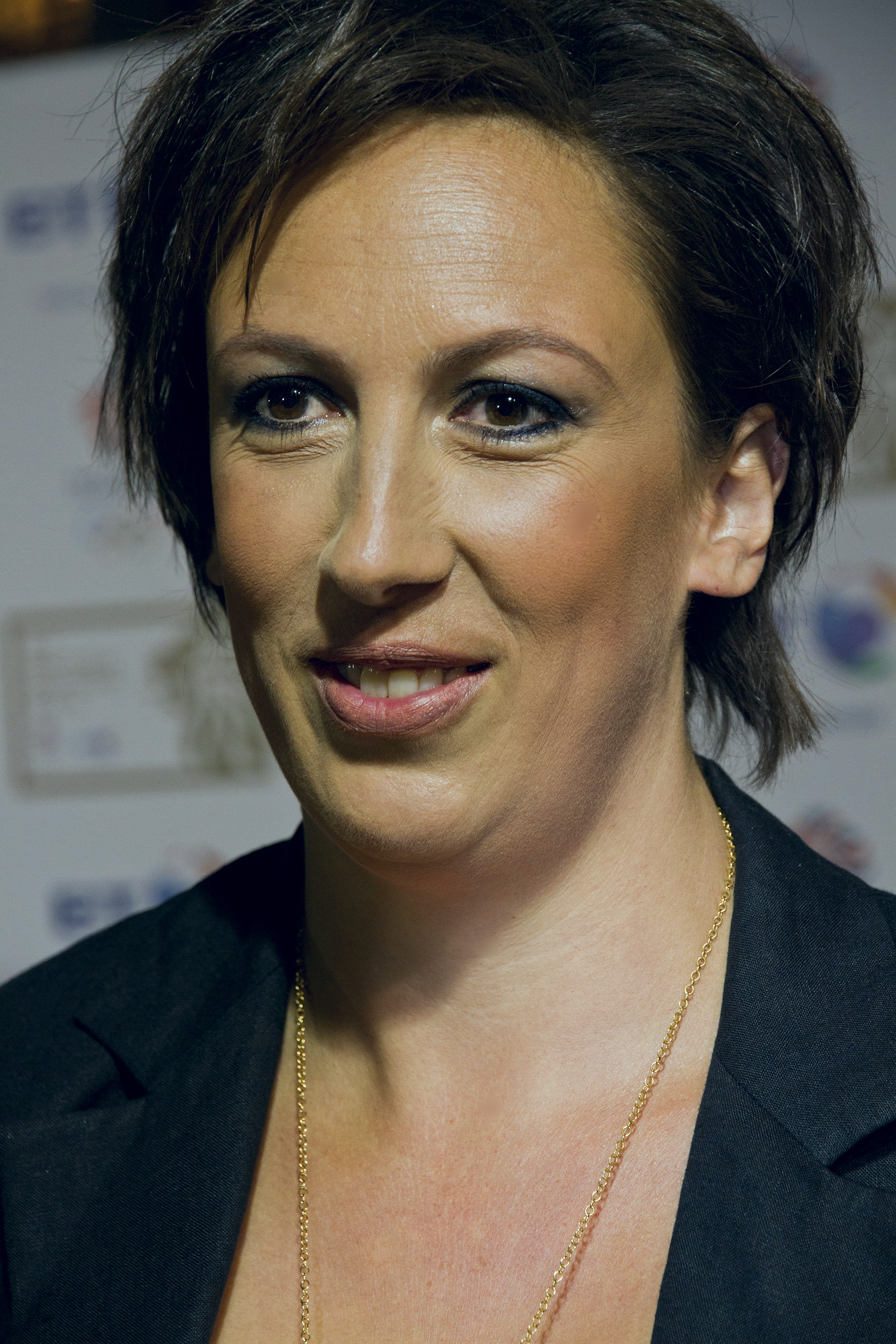
- Hart in 2011
- Born: Miranda Katherine Hart Dyke; 14 December 1972 (age 53); Torquay, Devon, England
- Education: University of the West of England, Bristol (BA); Academy of Live and Recorded Arts (MA)
- Occupations: Actress; comedian; writer
- Years active: 1994–present
- Spouse: Richard Fairs (m. 2024)
- Father: David Hart Dyke
- Relatives: Tom Hart Dyke (paternal first cousin); Lord Luce (maternal uncle); Sir William Luce (maternal grandfather); Edward Luce (maternal first cousin)
- Miranda Hart's voice Recorded December 2013
- Website: mirandahart.com

Miranda Katherine Hart Dyke (born 14 December 1972), is an English actress, comedian and writer. She has won three Royal Television Society awards, four British Comedy Awards and four BAFTA nominations for her self-driven semi-autobiographical BBC sitcom Miranda (2009–2015).

Before her own series was commissioned, Hart made appearances in various BBC sitcoms, including The Vicar of Dibley (2005), Hyperdrive (2006–2007) and Not Going Out (2006–2009). She appeared as Camilla "Chummy" Fortescue-Cholmondeley-Browne in the BBC drama series Call the Midwife (2012–2015) and made her Hollywood debut in the action comedy film Spy (2015).

Hart has written several books. In 2017, Hart presented the Royal Variety Performance in the presence of the Duke and Duchess of Cambridge, making her the first solo female presenter in 105 years. In 2026, she was a contestant on the second series of the reality show The Celebrity Traitors.

== Early life ==
=== Family ===
Hart was born on 14 December 1972 in Torquay, Devon, to Diana Margaret (née Luce), daughter of Sir William Luce, Commander-in-Chief and Governor of Aden and sister of Lord Luce and Captain David Hart Dyke, an officer in the Royal Navy and a member of the Hart Dyke family. Hart's father was the commanding officer of HMS Coventry when it was sunk during the 1982 Falklands conflict and was badly burned. Hart has a younger sister, Alice.

Hart is from an aristocratic background; her aunt and uncle live in Lullingstone Castle. However, she does not consider herself upper class.

=== Education ===
Hart grew up in Petersfield, Hampshire. She was privately educated at Downe House, an independent boarding school for girls near Thatcham, Berkshire. She was a classmate, distant relative, and friend of the sports presenter Clare Balding, who was head girl. She attended the University of the West of England, Bristol, graduating with a 2:1 in political science. She then completed a postgraduate course in acting at the Academy of Live and Recorded Arts.

== Career ==
=== Television ===
In 2002, she performed a solo show in Edinburgh and in 2004 she pitched a comedy show to the BBC. At her read-through for BBC executives, Absolutely Fabulous writer and star Jennifer Saunders was present.

Before her own series was commissioned, Hart made appearances in various British sitcoms. In Not Going Out she initially appeared as an acupuncturist. However, her performance impressed producers so much that they wrote a regular role for her as Barbara, a sarcastic and clumsy cleaner. She continued to play the part until the production of Miranda in 2009. Hart earned a British Comedy Award nomination for her role as Teal in two series of the BBC television comedy sci-fi sitcom Hyperdrive, which ran from January 2006 to August 2007.

Hart also appeared in minor roles in French & Saunders, My Family and Other Animals, Nighty Night, Absolutely Fabulous, The Vicar of Dibley as a speed-dating host, Lead Balloon, William and Mary, Smack the Pony (for which she wrote and performed in a couple of sketches and a number of video diaries), Stupid!, Monday Monday as Tall Karen, and as a minicab driver in the Channel 5 comedy Angelos, which ran for 6 episodes.

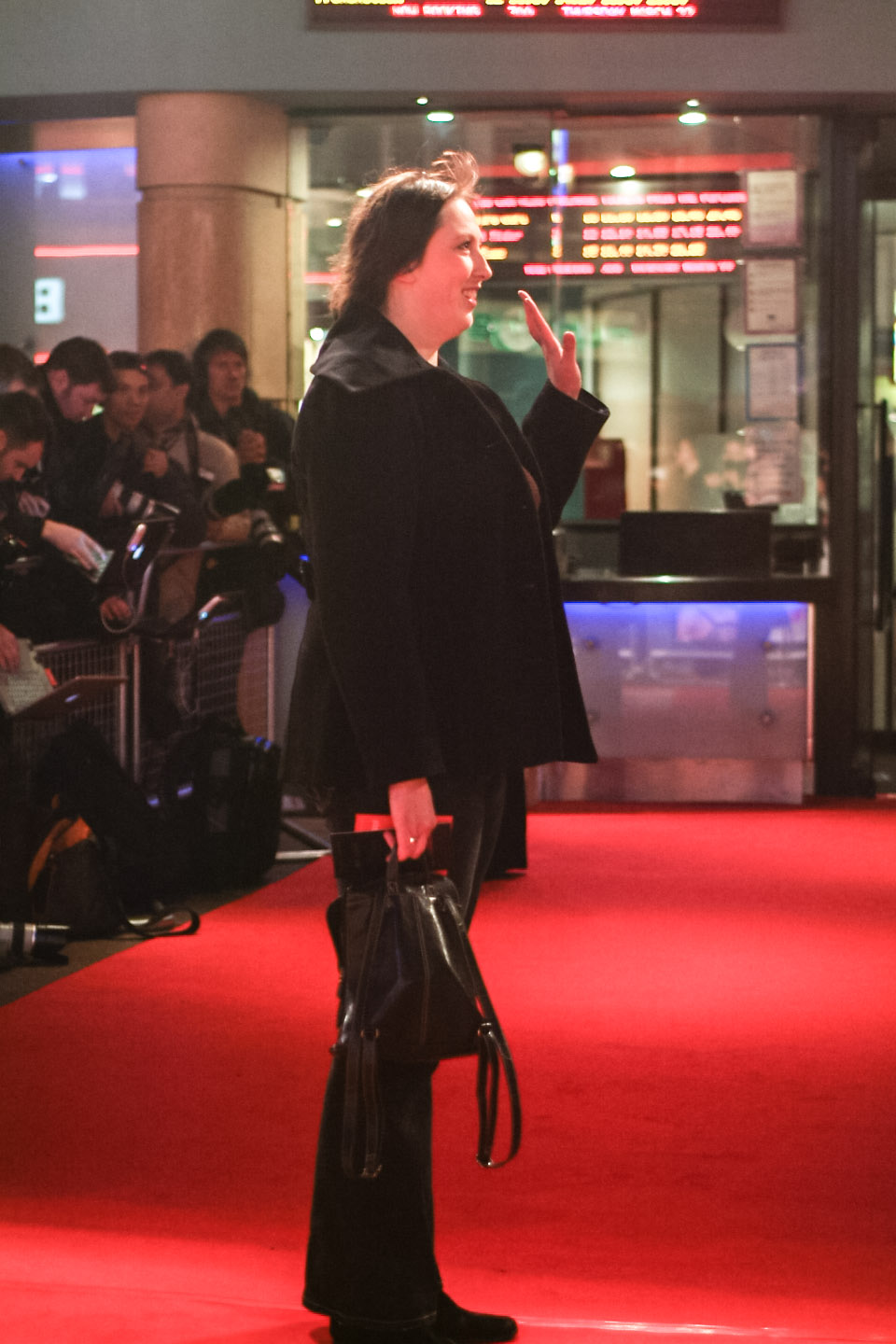
Hart at the London premiere of I Want Candy in March 2007

Hart is best known for her performance in her self-titled, self-penned and semi-autobiographical sitcom Miranda, which began broadcasting from November 2009. The situation comedy also features Sarah Hadland, Tom Ellis, Patricia Hodge, James Holmes, and Sally Phillips. The series is based on Hart's semi-autobiographical writing and followed a television pilot and the BBC Radio 2 comedy Miranda Hart's Joke Shop. Described as an "old-fashioned" sitcom, it received positive comments from critics and Hart won the 2009 Royal Television Society award for comedy performance for her role in the first series.

A second series was commissioned and filming started in mid-2010. The series began airing on BBC Two and BBC HD on 15 November 2010. A third series began broadcasting from 26 December 2012 on BBC One. Repeats of the show have begun airing on UKTV Gold. She also presented a BBC spoof programme looking back over 2009 called 2009 Unwrapped with Miranda Hart. A similar show looking back over 2010 was also broadcast in December 2010. In 2014, she announced that her sitcom Miranda would come to an end after two final episodes due to air in December 2014.

She appeared as guest host of Have I Got News for You in October 2009, December 2010 and again in December 2011. On 27 December, she was a team member on Big Fat Quiz 2011, a quiz about the events of that year presented by Jimmy Carr, appearing alongside David Walliams (team blue). As a fan of the series, Hart has also appeared twice on Strictly Come Dancing: It Takes Two. On Boxing Day 2011, she appeared in an episode of Bear Grylls' Wild Weekend. She also scaled down one of the Alps with Bear Grylls in a show with him in March 2013. She has appeared on the Graham Norton Show 8 times, on 10 May and 3 December in 2010, 29 April 2011, 19 October 2012, 20 December 2013, 24 October 2014, 8 May 2015, and 11 October 2024. In January 2013, Hart appeared on Room 101 along with Reggie Yates and John Craven.

In 2012, Hart began to appear in the BBC One drama Call the Midwife, playing the character of "Camilla 'Chummy' Fortescue-Cholmondeley-Browne".

As part of the 60-year Diamond Jubilee celebrations, Hart co-presented a number of segments at the Diamond Jubilee Concert in 2012. In 2013, Hart presented a one-off interview show with her hero Bruce Forsyth entitled When Miranda Met Bruce.

In December 2013, Hart played Ben's mother Linda in David Walliams's TV film adaptation of his book Gangsta Granny. Also in December 2013, she was lined up to star in To Love, Honour and Betray (Till Divorce Do Us Part), the television version of Kathy Lette's novel.

In December 2017, Hart took part in Celebrity Send To All in the third series of Michael McIntyre's Big Show.

In 2017, it was reported that her sitcom Miranda may return for a fourth series, and was said to be in the conception stage. However, in early 2018, Hart denied the rumours were true, stating that she had "thought about" it, "that's all." A 10th anniversary special of Miranda, filmed at the London Palladium in 2019 and described by Hart as "a party (not a new episode)", aired on BBC One on 1 January 2020. Hart appeared on the second series of The Celebrity Traitors in October 2026.

=== Film ===
Hart played a cameo in David Baddiel's feature film The Infidel and appeared in World of Wrestling, a short film by Tim Plester, in which she played "Klondyke Kate", a wrestler billed as "hell in boots." The film was released in late 2007 alongside its companion shorts Blakes Junction 7 and Ant Muzak. Hart made a cameo appearance as a loan officer in the 2007 comedy film Magicians which featured David Mitchell and Robert Webb, both stars of the long running television series Peep Show.

In 2013, 12 in a Box was released, a feature film in which Hart plays a small role that was originally made in 2007. In 2015, she co-starred in the comedy film Spy, which was filmed on location in Budapest, Hungary. In 2020, Hart played "harmless chatterbox" Miss Bates in the Jane Austen adaptation film Emma., (Note: The title of the film has a period attached to signify it being a period piece.) alongside Anya Taylor-Joy and Bill Nighy.

=== Radio ===
Her semi-autobiographical series Miranda Hart's Joke Shop was aired on BBC Radio 2 in 2008 and went on from there to be developed into the television series Miranda. Hart has also presented comedy specials for the network alongside Jon Holmes. In October 2011, she attracted criticism after co-hosting The Chris Evans Breakfast Show with Holmes while Chris Evans was on holiday. The website Digital Spy reported that some listeners were unhappy with the quality of the programme. The BBC issued a statement in response saying, "Miranda Hart is one of the UK's best-loved comedians and BBC Radio 2 felt it appropriate to bring her warmth to its audience for a week. Jon Holmes is a highly experienced presenter from BBC Radio 6 Music [...] BBC Radio 2 appreciates if their presentation wasn't to everyone's liking, but feels it's important to be able to bring new talent to its output and hopes its audience understands the importance of maintaining a breadth of content on the network."

=== Live performances ===
Avoiding the normal stand-up circuit for more character-based comedy, including an appearance in the Edinburgh and touring show The Sitcom Trials, Hart has written her own theatre material for the Edinburgh Fringe. Her one-woman shows include Miranda Hart – Throbs, It's All About Me and Miranda Hart's House Party. She also performed in Alecky Blythe's 2006 play Cruising at the Bush Theatre.

She was among the performers at the Diamond Jubilee concert held outside Buckingham Palace on 4 June 2012.

Hart embarked on her first tour in 2014, titled My, What I Call, Live Show, performing in arenas in the UK and Ireland. Tickets went on sale on 17 December 2012.

=== Comic Relief ===
Hart was the second contestant to be voted off the third series of Comic Relief does Fame Academy in 2007. Two years later, she appeared in the final sketch from comedy duo French and Saunders, which was broadcast during Red Nose Day 2009. In 2010, she and six other TV celebrities raised over £1 million for the charity Sport Relief cycling from John O'Groats to Land's End. She starred as a judge on both series two and three of Let's Dance for Comic Relief, alongside other guest judges including Kelly Brook, Rufus Hound and Louie Spence in 2010 and 2011.

In aid of Comic Relief, a Miranda mini-episode set in the world of Pineapple Dance Studios was broadcast on 18 March as part of Red Nose Day 2011. She took part in a Red Nose Day edition of Celebrity MasterChef in 2011, which she won. Hart also co-presented Sport Relief 2012, which concluded with her and fellow comedian David Walliams dancing semi-naked to ABBA's "Dancing Queen". She also donated a signed Miranda script to be auctioned in aid of Comic Relief.

=== Stage ===
It was announced in February 2017 that Hart would star as "Miss Hannigan" in the West End production of Annie.

=== Books ===
Hart released a book in October 2012 titled Is It Just Me?, featuring stories, anecdotes and life advice delivered in her own style. In January 2013, it was announced that she was writing a second book, called Peggy and Me, which was to be published on 9 October 2014, but was pushed back to 2015, and finally released in October 2016, due to her laptop being stolen. The Best of Miranda, a compilation of scripts from the TV series Miranda, was published on 23 October 2014. In partnership with Comic Relief, Hart released a book called Miranda Hart's Daily Dose of Such Fun! in 2017, which featured something unique for the reader to do each day in the year. Also in 2017, she published The Girl with the Lost Smile, released in October. Hart's memoir, titled I Haven't Been Entirely Honest with You, was released on 10 October 2024.

== Personal life ==
On 6 July 2024, Hart married chartered building surveyor Richard William Fairs in Hambledon, Hampshire. Hart is a Christian; she once said to fellow theist Victoria Coren Mitchell, "It's scary to say you're pro-God". She lives in Hammersmith, West London.

=== Health ===
In August 2024, Hart revealed on The One Show that she had been chronically ill for three years. In her memoir, I Haven't Been Entirely Honest with You, published in October 2024, Hart revealed that she had been diagnosed with Lyme disease, which led to her becoming bed and house-bound with ME/CFS. She has said "Probably when I was about 14 or 15, I got a tick-borne illness... and that's when my symptoms started." Hart later said the "easy version" of her condition was that she had ME caused by Lyme disease. It had "played havoc with my immune system", with viral infections such as shingles constantly being reactivated. She listed 10 keys to living well, which she says emerged after much research and have helped her "live a life of joy and meaning and fulfilment in a way I never have before."

== Filmography ==
=== Film ===
Film roles
Year	Title	Role	Notes
2004	Mothers & Daughters	Kate	
2006	Don't Even Think It!	Ginny Singleton	Short film
2007	12 in a Box	Rachel	
2007	I Want Candy	Working Title Receptionist	
2007	Magicians	Bank Manager	
2007	World of Wrestling	Klondyke	Short film
2008	Tales of the River Bank	Miss Much (voice)	Direct-to-DVD
2009	A Very British Cult	Joyce	Short film
2010	The Infidel	Mrs. Keyes	
2011	The Itch of the Golden Nit	Julie (voice)	Short film
2015	Spy	Nancy B. Artingstall	
2018	The Nutcracker and the Four Realms	Dew Drop Fairy	Uncredited role
2020	Emma.	Miss Bates	
2023	The Canterville Ghost	Algernean Van Finchley (voice)	

=== Television ===
Film roles
Year	Title	Role	Notes
2001	Smack the Pony	Various characters	Series 3; Episodes 4–6
2004	William and Mary	Penelope	Series 2; Episode 4
2004	Absolutely Fabulous	Yoko	Series 5; Episode 9: "White Box" (Christmas Special)
2005	The Vicar of Dibley	Suzie	Episode: "Happy New Year" (New Year Special)
2005	Man Stroke Woman	Customer	Series 1; Episode 5
2005	Nighty Night	Beth	Series 2; 4 episodes
2005	My Family and Other Animals	Jonquil	Television film
2005–2006	Comedy Lab	Various characters	Series 7; Episode 2: "Speeding" and Series 8; Episode 8: "Slap"
2006	Lead Balloon	Maureen	Series 1; Episode 1: "Rubbish"
2006	Stupid!	Various characters	Series 2; Episodes 1–10
2006–2007	Hyperdrive	Teal	Series 1 & 2; 12 episodes
2006–2009	Not Going Out	Acupuncturist / Barbara	Series 1–3; 16 episodes
2007	Rush Hour	Lollipop Lady	Series 1
2007	Roman's Empire	Casting Director	Mini-series; Episode 5
2007	Angelo's	Shelley	Episodes 1–6
2007	The Everglades	(unnamed role)	Television short film
2008	Hotel Trubble	Mrs. Lily Lemon	Series 1; Episode 1: "Tall Tales"
2009	French and Saunders' Mamma Mia!	Phyllida Lloyd	Sketch for Red Nose Day 2009
2009	Monday Monday	Tall Karen	Episodes 1–7
2009	The Story of Slapstick	Herself - Narrator	Television film
2009–2013	Would I Lie to You?	Herself - Panellist	Series 3–7; 5 episodes
2009–2015	Miranda	Miranda Preston	Series 1–3, and 4 Specials; 20 episodes (also writer)
2010	The One Ronnie	Cake Shop Owner / Church Committee Member	Christmas Television Special
2012–2015	Call the Midwife	Chummy Browne (later Noakes)	Series 1-4 (including Specials); 22 episodes
2013	Comic Relief: Red Nose Day 2013	Herself / Chummy Noakes	Television Special for Comic Relief
2013	Gangsta Granny	Linda	Television film
2017	Miranda: Morecambe & Wise and Me	Herself - Host	Television film
2017	Comic Relief: Red Nose Day 2017	Herself - Co-presenter	Television Special for Comic Relief
2017	All Gardens Great & Small	Herself - Narrator	Episodes 1–3
2019	Mamma Mia! Here We Go Yet Again	Ol Parker	Sketch for Red Nose Day 2019
2019	Hypocrite	Bar patron	Television short film
2020	Miranda’s Games with Showbiz Names	Herself - Host	Celebrity Christmas show
2026	The Celebrity Traitors	Herself - Contestant	Series 2
2026	The Lycett Arms	Herself - Guest Comic	Episode 6

== Awards and nominations ==
In 2010, Hart won the Best Comedy Performance award from the Royal Television Society for her performance in Miranda and was also nominated for best comedy writing. She and Patricia Hodge were both nominated for "Best Comedy Actress" awards at the Monte-Carlo TV Festival 2010.

In 2011, she won "Best Comedy Actress" and "People's Choice Award for the King or Queen of Comedy" in the British Comedy Awards 2011, where Miranda also won "Best New British TV Comedy" and was nominated for "Best Sitcom". The same year, she was nominated for a BAFTA for Best Actress in a comedy role and her hit BBC Two sitcom Miranda was nominated for the BAFTA YouTube choice award, the only award voted for by the public.

Awards and nominations
Year	Nominated work	Award	Category	Result
2006	Hyperdrive	British Comedy Awards	Best Female Comedy Newcomer	Nominated
2010	Miranda—Series 1	British Comedy Awards	Best TV Sitcom	Nominated
2010	Miranda—Series 1	British Comedy Awards	Best New TV Comedy	Won
2010	Miranda—Series 1	British Comedy Awards	Best TV Comedy Actress	Won
2010	Miranda—Series 1	British Comedy Awards	People's Choice Award	Won
2010	Miranda—Series 1	British Academy Television Awards	Best Female Performance in a Comedy Role	Nominated
2010	Miranda—Series 1	British Academy Television Awards	Best Situation Comedy	Nominated
2010	Miranda—Series 1	Monte-Carlo TV Festival—Golden Nymph	Outstanding Actress in a Comedy Series	Nominated
2010	Miranda—Series 1	Royal Television Society Awards	Best Writer for a Comedy	Nominated
2010	Miranda—Series 1	Royal Television Society Awards	Best Comedy Performance	Nominated
2011	Miranda—Series 2	Royal Television Society Awards	Best Comedy Performance	Won
2011	Miranda—Series 2	Royal Television Society Awards	Best Scripted Comedy	Won
2011	Miranda—Series 2	Banff TV Festival—Banff Rockie Award	Best Sitcom	Nominated
2011	Miranda—Series 2	British Academy Television Awards	Best Female Performance in a Comedy Role	Nominated
2011	Miranda—Series 2	British Comedy Awards	Best TV Comedy Actress	Won
2011	Miranda—Series 2	British Comedy Awards	Best TV Sitcom	Nominated
2011	Miranda—Series 2	British Comedy Awards	People's Choice Award	Nominated
2011	Miranda—Series 2	Broadcasting Press Guild Awards	Best Comedy and/or Entertainment	Won
2011	Miranda—Series 2	TV Quick Awards	Best Comedy Show	Nominated
2012	Miranda—Series 2	National Television Awards	Most Popular Sitcom	Nominated
2012	Is It Just Me?	National Book Awards	Non-Fiction Book of the Year	Won
2012	Call the Midwife	British Academy Television Awards	Best Supporting Actress	Nominated
2013	Call the Midwife	National Television Awards	Outstanding Drama Performance (Female)	Won
2013	Miranda—Series 3	British Academy Television Awards	Best Female Performance in a Comedy Role	Nominated
2016	Miranda—Specials	British Academy Television Awards	Best Female Performance in a Comedy Role	Nominated

On 5 January 2025 Hart's life and work, in relation to her tastes and experiences of music, was the subject of BBC Radio 3's programme Private Passions, presented by Michael Berkeley.; repeat broadcast 29 March 2026.

== Tours ==
My, What I Call, Live Show
Date	City	Country	Venue
Australia
1 February 2014	Sydney	Australia	Seymour Centre
2 February 2014	Sydney	Australia	Seymour Centre
10 February 2014	Melbourne	Australia	Melbourne Athenaeum
11 February 2014	Melbourne	Australia	Melbourne Athenaeum
12 February 2014	Melbourne	Australia	Melbourne Athenaeum
UK and Ireland
28 February 2014	Bournemouth	England	Bournemouth International Centre
1 March 2014	Bournemouth	England	Bournemouth International Centre
2 March 2014	Bournemouth	England	Bournemouth International Centre
4 March 2014	Plymouth	England	Plymouth Pavilions
5 March 2014	Plymouth	England	Plymouth Pavilions
6 March 2014	Nottingham	England	Capital FM Arena
7 March 2014	Nottingham	England	Capital FM Arena
8 March 2014	Nottingham	England	Capital FM Arena
10 March 2014	Cardiff	Wales	Motorpoint Arena Cardiff
11 March 2014	Cardiff	Wales	Motorpoint Arena Cardiff
12 March 2014	London	England	The O_{2} Arena
13 March 2014	London	England	The O_{2} Arena
14 March 2014	Manchester	England	Manchester Arena
15 March 2014	Manchester	England	Manchester Arena
17 March 2014	Glasgow	Scotland	The Hydro
18 March 2014	Glasgow	Scotland	The Hydro
19 March 2014	Newcastle	England	Metro Radio Arena
20 March 2014	Newcastle	England	Metro Radio Arena
21 March 2014	Leeds	England	First Direct Arena
23 March 2014	Leeds	England	First Direct Arena
24 March 2014	Liverpool	England	Echo Arena Liverpool
25 March 2014	Liverpool	England	Echo Arena Liverpool
28 March 2014	Belfast	Northern Ireland	Odyssey Arena
29 March 2014	Dublin	Ireland	The O_{2}
1 April 2014	Brighton	England	Brighton Centre
2 April 2014	Brighton	England	Brighton Centre
5 April 2014	Sheffield	England	Motorpoint Arena Sheffield
6 April 2014	Sheffield	England	Motorpoint Arena Sheffield
8 April 2014	Birmingham	England	National Indoor Arena
9 April 2014	Birmingham	England	National Indoor Arena
10 April 2014	Birmingham	England	National Indoor Arena
11 April 2014	London	England	The O_{2} Arena
12 April 2014	London	England	The O_{2} Arena
10 October 2014	London	England	Wembley Arena
11 October 2014	London	England	Wembley Arena
15 October 2014	Cardiff	Wales	Motorpoint Arena
18 October 2014	Cardiff	Wales	Motorpoint Arena

== Works and publications ==
- Hart, Miranda (2012). Is It Just Me?. London: Hodder & Stoughton. ISBN 978-1-44-473414-0. OCLC 884722084.
- Hart, Miranda (2014). The Best of Miranda: Favourite Episodes Plus Added Treats - Such Fun!. London: Hodder & Stoughton. ISBN 9781444799354. OCLC 887937305.
- Hart, Miranda (2016). Peggy and Me. Hodder & Stoughton. ISBN 978-1-44-476913-5. OCLC 908706052.
- Hart, Miranda (2017). Miranda Hart's Daily Dose of Such Fun!. Hodder Paperbacks. ISBN 978-1473656451.
- Hart, Miranda (2017). The Girl with the Lost Smile. Hodder Children's Books. ISBN 978-1444941364.
- Hart, Miranda (2024). I Haven't Been Entirely Honest with You. Michael Joseph. ISBN 978-1405958332.
