= Paul Kerensa =

English comedian (born 1979)

Paul Kerensa (born 1979 in Truro, Cornwall) is an English comedy writer and stand-up comedian.

== Education and career ==
He studied at Royal Grammar School, Guildford and the Guildford School of Acting. In 2002 Kerensa won ITV's 'Take The Mike' Award, and was a finalist in The Daily Telegraph Open Mic Awards and the BBC New Comedy Awards. Kerensa won the BBC Radio Titheridge Prize, leading to writing credits on many major BBC Radio 4 shows. He wrote, and briefly appeared in, the television series Miranda. He was a co-writer on the television series Not Going Out.

He appeared regularly on the segment "Pause for Thought", during The Chris Evans Breakfast Show on BBC Radio 2. Kerensa was writer on the 2015 series of TFI Friday. As of 2016 he was hired by Chris Evans as a writer on the 2016 series of Top Gear.

In 2025 he wrote The Truth About Phyllis Twigg, a play about what is now believed to be the first original radio play "The Truth About Father Christmas", broadcast on December 24th 1922. The Truth About Phyllis Twigg aired on BBC Radio 4 on December 24th 2025.

== Books ==
In 2013 Kerensa authored the book So A Comedian Walks Into A Church: Confessions of a Kneel-Down Stand-up, followed in 2014 by "Genesis: The Bibluffer's Guide".
