= Nancy Lam =

Singaporean celebrity chef

- Born: 1948 (age 76–77); Singapore
- Culinary career
- Cooking style: Southeast Asian cuisine, with Indonesian influences
- Current restaurant(s): Enak Enak, London, United Kingdom

Nancy Lam (born in Singapore in 1948) is a Singaporean celebrity chef famous for her Southeast Asian cuisine and television appearances.

== Beginnings ==
Nancy Lam moved to London, United Kingdom from Singapore at the age of 22. After originally training as a nurse, she gained popularity after catering for hotel guests and hosting regular barbecues for charitable events.

Lam opened her own restaurant "Enak Enak" in Lavender Hill (A3036), Battersea, London SW11, in 1988. A major refurbishment of the restaurant took place between May and October 2004.

== Media appearances ==
Following writeups in the London culinary press, Lam's cooking show was one of the launch programmes on Channel 5 in 1997. Since then, she has been a regular guest on various cookery shows, including Daily Cooks, Market Kitchen and This Morning. She has also taken part in Trust Me – I'm a Holiday Rep, Big Brother's Big Mouth, Hole in the Wall, Saturday Night Takeaway and Let's Dance for Comic Relief. Lam also made a guest appearance in Big Brother 2010 (UK) to cook Thai food for the five remaining housemates.

In an episode of Celebrity Total Wipeout broadcast 18 September 2010, Lam was supposed to take part but had to pull out and spectate.
