= Miranda (TV series) =

British TV sitcom (2009–2015)

- Genre: Sitcom; Cringe comedy; Farce
- Created by: Miranda Hart
- Written by: Miranda Hart, James Cary and Richard Hurst.
- Directed by: Juliet May; Mandie Fletcher
- Starring: Miranda Hart; Tom Ellis; Sarah Hadland; Patricia Hodge; Sally Phillips; James Holmes; Bo Poraj
- Theme music composer: Alex Eckford
- Country of origin: United Kingdom
- Original language: English
- No. of series: 3
- No. of episodes: 20 (list of episodes)

Production
- Executive producer: Jo Sargent
- Producers: Nerys Evans (2009); Emma Strain (2010–2013); Sarah Fraser (2014–2015)
- Production locations: BBC Television Centre (2009–2013); The London Studios (2014–2015 specials)
- Camera setup: Multi-camera; Video (2009–2015); HD video (on location 2014–2015)
- Running time: 30 minutes 35 minutes (2014–2015 specials)

Original release
- Network: BBC Two
- Release: 9 November 2009 – 20 December 2010
- Network: BBC One
- Release: 26 December 2012 – 1 January 2015

Related
- Call Me Kat

Miranda is a British television sitcom written by and starring the eponymous comedian Miranda Hart. It originally aired on BBC Two from 9 November 2009, and later on BBC One. Developed from Hart's semi-autobiographical BBC Radio 2 comedy Miranda Hart's Joke Shop (2008), the situation comedy revolves around socially inept Miranda, who frequently finds herself in awkward situations. The show features actors Sarah Hadland, Tom Ellis and Patricia Hodge. It was filmed in front of live audiences at the BBC Television Centre and The London Studios.

Receiving positive reviews from television critics, Miranda won a Royal Television Society award and gained several BAFTA TV Award nominations. The series has since been regularly repeated on British television and is available in the United States through Hulu.

== Premise ==
The episodes revolve around the difficulties that Miranda (Miranda Hart) gets herself into. She is 6 ft 1 in (185 cm) tall and sometimes mistaken for a man and addressed as 'Sir'. She has never fitted in with her old boarding school friends, Tilly (Sally Phillips) and Fanny (Katy Wix) and finds social situations awkward, especially around men. She is a constant disappointment to her mother, Penny (Patricia Hodge), who is desperate for her to get a proper job and a husband. Although Miranda owns and lives above her own joke shop and boutique, she lacks any real capacity for business, so it is managed by her childhood friend Stevie Sutton (Sarah Hadland). The restaurant next door is initially run by Clive Evans (James Holmes), until series three, when the restaurant's chef, Gary Preston (Tom Ellis), purchases it from him. After many failed attempts at dating, Miranda and Gary, a friend from university whom Miranda fancies, decide to be just friends. Nevertheless, when Gary gets a girlfriend called Rose (Naomi Bentley), it prompts Miranda to start a new relationship with Michael 'Mike' Jackford (Bo Poraj), a local reporter whose work soon takes him to Africa. Upon his return he proposes to Miranda, as does Gary when he realises his love for her. Miranda accepts Gary's proposal rather than Mike's and Miranda and Gary get married in the final episode.

== Cast ==
- Miranda Hart as Miranda – An ungainly, socially awkward, 35-year-old woman who frequently finds herself in awkward and bizarre situations. She is something of a misfit relative to her upper-middle-class family, opting to invest an inheritance from her uncle in a joke/gift shop rather than pursuing what her mother perceives as a more "respectable" career, and balking at the supposedly "suitable" men that her mother and friends try to set her up with. Miranda struggles with everyday adult life, often indulging in odd, childlike behaviour (including adding faces and clothes to pieces of fruit and vegetables, dubbing them "Fruit Friends" and "Vegeta-Pals") and getting thrown out of numerous establishments. Although this often irritates her friends and family, they tolerate her because, at heart, she is intelligent and good-natured, despite not always showing it. In the final episode, after she breaks up with Gary, some of her awkward and childish behaviour disappears; this causes considerable concern for her friends and mother, who organise a therapy session. However, she finally accepts that her only serious problem – her lack of confidence – is now gone and although she does not need Gary, she does indeed love him. After an initial panic over an unexpected wedding, she marries Gary at his restaurant.
- Tom Ellis as Gary Preston – A handsome, friendly chef; an old university friend of Miranda. Although there has always been an undercurrent of attraction between them, neither has pursued it until he begins working at the restaurant next to Miranda's shop. Despite often being confused by Miranda's behaviour, Gary generally finds her kind, open nature endearing, especially as she is willing to help him out when needed. Gary is more confident and worldly than Miranda, but he shares her insecurity in romantic situations, and occasionally becomes embroiled in odd situations with her — for example, the pretence that they have sons called "Cliff" and "Richard" when challenged by a customer in the shop. He is one of the few people who accepts Miranda as she is. Miranda and Gary date briefly in series two, though this breaks down when it is revealed Gary was married (for a green card) to a waitress that Miranda had befriended at the restaurant. Gary also dates Rose briefly in series three, before breaking up with her due to her being unable to accept Miranda. After becoming engaged, Miranda becomes concerned that he has never said he loves her. When she confronts him, Gary tells Miranda that her distinctive lack of confidence in herself means that they can never truly be together. In the final episode, when Miranda accepts herself, she rushes to what she believes is Gary's wedding, where he is actually best man for his former boss Clive. Gary reveals he has already decided that he loves Miranda and offers to elope; she decides that she does not need to run away and marries Gary at Clive's reception.
- Sarah Hadland as Stevie Sutton – Miranda's best friend, and the Assistant Manager of the joke shop (although in reality she does most of the work due to Miranda's lack of business sense). Stevie is generally more level-headed and ambitious than Miranda, but is not averse to becoming involved in her strange behaviour, or indeed indulging in some of her own, including frequently performing Heather Small's "Proud" while holding a cardboard cut-out of the singer whenever she is pleased with herself. Because of this, Miranda and Stevie often get into petty arguments and competitions, such as when a customer leaves his wallet and both Miranda and Stevie attempt to impress him. Miranda frequently mocks Stevie for her small stature, and frequently pushes her over when she irritates Miranda. Despite often claiming to have "the allure" and mocking Miranda's attempts with men, Stevie also shares Miranda's lack of success, sometimes coming across as desperate when she chats someone up. She occasionally uses an unkempt and unpleasant traffic warden (played by Joe Wilkinson) as a date when trying to compete with Miranda. In the final episode, the traffic warden appears again and Stevie kisses him to avoid getting a parking ticket.
- Patricia Hodge as Penny – Miranda's upper-middle-class mother, a "lady who lunches", who likes to impress her friends and fellow W.I. members. Her main mission in life is to find Miranda a man and a better job. She despairs at Miranda's decision to run a joke/gift shop, and her tendency to reject suitable (or at least available) men, on numerous occasions trying to set up Miranda with her cousin. Although often embarrassed by her daughter, Penny displays many of Miranda's erratic traits and often teams up with Miranda for their benefit, such as when they are in the psychiatrist's office. Despite being prepared to humiliate Miranda for her own gain (to the point of holding up a placard offering to pay someone to marry Miranda), Penny's actions are borne out of genuine love and concern, and on the rare occasions where Miranda is doing well she shows her love by cheering "Go Miranda". Penny's catchphrase, "Such fun!" is normally used to describe an activity or event where she believes Miranda may find a husband. Another catchphrase of Penny's, especially in the first series, is 'What I call', which she says before numerous everyday things before Miranda points out that that is simply the word for it, and not just what Penny calls it (for example, 'I'm meeting a friend for a spot of, what I call, tea.') Penny tends to ignore Miranda's obvious lack of interest or discomfort. In the final episode, Penny turns up at Miranda's flat two days after her break-up with Gary, insensitively suggesting they simply find another groom. Miranda finally loses her temper and tells Penny to get out; this causes Penny to go on a drinking binge at her local tennis club. She soon turns up at Miranda's flat and tearfully confesses that her relationship with Miranda's father has been dead for some time. Thanks to her daughter's new confidence, Penny regains her dignity and joyfully embraces Miranda when she marries Gary several days later.
- Sally Phillips as Tilly – An old school friend of Miranda's and the daughter of Penny's never-seen best friend Belinda, who fits right in with their private school background, often showing more in common with Penny than Miranda does. Tilly is a socialite and normally quite self-centred, though on occasion, she does come through for her friends and shows that she is kind and generous. She will often address Miranda by her school nickname, "Queen Kong" (due to Miranda's stature and clumsiness), despite Miranda's displeasure, but her criticisms and attempts to help Miranda are generally well intentioned. Tilly's catchphrase is "bear with", usually said as she breaks off conversations to read text messages. While seeming more confident and together than Miranda, she has her own problems romantically, particularly when her fiancé, Rupert (played by Adam James), makes a pass at Miranda behind her back. In the penultimate episode, she becomes engaged to her army doctor boyfriend, "Dreamboat" (later "Ping-pong", then "Cucumber") Charlie (played by Adrian Scarborough). The final episode sees Miranda give Tilly tickets to Wick so she can be free of her mother and elope with Charlie.
- James Holmes as Clive Evans (2009–2010, 2015) – The camp, vicious-tongued owner of the restaurant where Gary works. He is usually more of a hindrance than help whenever he attempts to help Miranda and Gary get together, accidentally revealing, for example, that Gary has a secret wife from Hong Kong named Tamara (played by Stacy Liu). Despite his jibes at Miranda, he does show traits of wanting to help her, such as when he pushes her to tell Gary his true feelings. He is absent from the third series having sold the restaurant to Gary off-screen. Clive returns in the final episode and marries the regular customer from previous episodes (played by Dominic Coleman).
- Bo Poraj as Michael Jackford (2012–2014) – Miranda's new boyfriend who works as a television reporter and loves Miranda for the real her. Michael made his final appearance in the penultimate episode, when Miranda peacefully turned down his marriage proposal in order to accept Gary's. In the final episode, Penny mentions that the character has flown to Africa, where he had previously returned from on a business venture.
- Naomi Bentley as Rose (2013) – Gary's new girlfriend. When Rose can't accept his past affections for Miranda, Gary breaks up with her. She is last seen entering Gary's restaurant for its re-opening, but when Miranda confesses her true feelings for Gary during an argument, Rose immediately walks out.
- Katy Wix as Fanny (2009) – Another socialite friend of Miranda's from boarding school. She appears during the first series alongside Tilly, but is not mentioned or seen as of the second series.
- John Finnemore and Margaret Cabourn-Smith as Chris and Alison (2009–2010, 2013–2014) – Sort-of friends of Gary and Miranda. As university students, Chris and Alison agreed to marry each other if they were still single at a certain age, but Chris whisked Alison away to Paris and proposed. During the second series, Alison becomes pregnant and they decide that Gary and Miranda should be godparents, but Miranda freaks out when they reveal she will also act as Alison's birthing partner. In the third series, Miranda, Gary and Rose babysit for them. They make their final appearance in the penultimate episode; their once joyous marriage now strained.
- Dominic Coleman (2009, 2013, 2015) as an unnamed customer who comes into the shop on three occasions, usually with the intention of buying something for his niece, but is distracted by the probing questions of Stevie and Miranda and gets roped into their antics (For example, suggesting Miranda should lie about being gay and then being roped into attending her coming out party.) He features in the final episode as the partner of Clive, whose wedding Miranda gatecrashes. Although never mentioned on screen, he is referred to on the BBC's website as 'Jim'.

== Production ==
=== Conception ===
Abigail Wilson, who worked for comedians Dawn French and Jennifer Saunders, suggested Hart pitch a show to the BBC after seeing her perform in 2003. Following a read-through of her script with Saunders and BBC executives, a television pilot, based on her semi-autobiographical writing, was filmed in early 2008, and the series was then developed into a sitcom for radio; Miranda Hart's Joke Shop aired on BBC Radio 2 in August and September 2008. A television series was commissioned in August 2008 and began filming in June 2009. Outdoor shots for series one were shot in Hounslow, West London.

The set of Miranda's shop was previously the set of Edina Monsoon's kitchen in Absolutely Fabulous. The set for Garys restaurant is a re-used set from other BBC Comedy Grownups.

In an interview with the BBC's Writersroom, Hart said of the semi-autobiographical basis for the series:

Well I developed this stand-up persona, and that's where it all started from. I realised I was getting laughs being a version of me, and that's what ended up in the sitcom. You do ultimately start from yourself but I'm pleased to say I did have to exaggerate for comedic effect. It wasn't entirely autobiographical. I'm not quite that mad.

== Episodes ==
| Series | Episodes | Originally released | | | Ave. UK viewers (million) |
| Series | Episodes | First released | Last released | Network | Ave. UK viewers (million) |
|---|---|---|---|---|---|
| 1 | 6 | 9 November 2009 | 14 December 2009 | BBC Two | 2.72 |
| 2 | 6 | 15 November 2010 | 20 December 2010 | BBC Two | 3.55 |
| 3 | 6 | 26 December 2012 | 28 January 2013 | BBC One | 9.48 |
| Specials | 2 | 25 December 2014 | 1 January 2015 | BBC One | 9.21 |

=== Series 1 (2009) ===
Each episode begins with a welcome to audience and a 'Previously in my life ...' segment, and Hart says a joke shop is the "right place" as the setting after being asked to consider an office to "normalise" the character. Her love of 1970s comedy programmes, such as Some Mothers Do 'Ave 'Em, is the influence for Miranda. The episodes end with a 'You have been watching ...' credits section where each cast member waves goodbye, as seen concluding Jimmy Perry and David Croft sitcoms such as Dad's Army and Hi-de-Hi!. Quoted in The Times, Hart says "I'm saying this is what I'm doing and I'm not scared to do it. Some of my comedy peers do slightly fear being a mainstream figure, as if it's slightly uncool. Well, I thought I'm going to embrace it." Throughout each episode, Hart breaks the fourth wall and addresses the audience directly, a technique described as a "simple creative decision [that] makes this infectious comedy sing"; another critic stated "this is hard to pull off, but it works well".

=== Series 2 (2010) ===
Following the conclusion of the first series, the BBC commissioned a second series for BBC Two in 2010. Of this, Hart said "I am not only relieved but totally overwhelmed by the response and thrilled that people have enjoyed the series. I am very grateful for all the support and to the BBC for giving me the chance to do another series next year." Filming started during the first weeks of summer, and the new series began broadcast in November 2010. The second series comprises six episodes and saw the return of Miranda's mother and friends, Stevie, Gary and Tilly.

For the BBC broadcast, following the end of each episode viewers could press the red button, or go online, to watch Hart interview a guest who had inspired her during the writing of the show. Hart's friend Clare Balding was the first guest and they discussed how Balding influenced the character of Tilly. Frank Skinner was interviewed for the second episode. Following the end of episode five, which is a two-hander between Miranda and Penny, the red-button feature saw Hart interview her real-life mother. In late 2010, Hart announced that she would be filming a special edition of Miranda for Comic Relief. The sketch saw Miranda team up with dancers from Pineapple Dance Studios.

=== Series 3 (2012–2013) ===
Miranda was recommissioned for a third series by BBC Comedy commissioner Cheryl Taylor in January 2011. Hart revealed that the third series might not be ready until 2012, but she may write a Christmas special. The following month it was announced that the third series of Miranda would be shown on BBC One. In April 2011, Hart announced on The Graham Norton Show that she had set herself to start writing the third series the following month. However, Hart revealed in November she had still not started writing the series. That same month it was announced Hart would not be doing a new Christmas special, though the 2010 Christmas episode would be repeated on BBC One.

On 17 December 2011, Andrew Mickel of Digital Spy reported Hart's involvement with BBC One drama Call the Midwife had delayed the third series of Miranda until Autumn 2012. Filming on the third series ended in early October 2012. A month later, a BBC News reporter revealed that Gary Barlow would appear in an episode of the third series as himself. They stated that he would "get friendly in an unexpected way" with Hart. The third series began broadcasting from 26 December 2012. The outdoor scenes for the second episode of the third series were filmed in Church Street, Kingston upon Thames.

=== Specials (2014–2015) ===
Due to the cliffhanger at the end of the third series, it was suspected that Miranda would return for a fourth series. However, in July 2014, Hart announced that there are no plans for a fourth series but 'a couple of specials' would be made. Hart later announced that the two Christmas specials would be the end to the sitcom. Hart said the end was "going to be really emotional", but added that she didn't want her sitcom character "to keep falling over and making a fool of herself".

The first special, titled "I Do, But To Who?" aired on 25 December 2014 and the final episode titled "The Final Curtain" aired on 1 January 2015.

=== Further specials ===
The main cast of Miranda (aside from Ellis and Holmes), reunited for the 2017 Royal Variety Performance, for which Hart was the host. They appeared several times throughout the evening in character.

To mark the 10th anniversary of the start of the show, the cast were recorded at the London Palladium in 2019 celebrating and commemorating the series. Hart announced the special on Twitter while stressing that it would not be a new episode. The 70-minute programme Miranda: My Such Fun Celebration was broadcast on BBC One on 1 January 2020.

== Reception ==
The first series was picked as one of the top 10 forthcoming TV shows for autumn 2009 by The Sunday Times. Ahead of the first episode airing, Dominic Maxwell in an article for The Times described it as an "old-school" sitcom and said that "It's good fun, if you buy into it. And if you do, it's because of Hart." Also describing it as "old-fashioned", Vicky Frost for The Guardian said of the slapstick physical comedy that "It's not clever – but it is funny. And that, I think is at the heart of Miranda's appeal." Mark Wright for The Stage said that Hodge gives a "brilliant, brilliant performance" and that "what sets Miranda out as something special is Hart herself, and the rest just gels around her." The first series opened with 2.63 million viewers (10% audience share), rising to 3.14 million viewers (12% share) for the fourth episode.

The second series opened with 3.19 million viewers, rising to 4.01 million viewers for the third episode. Rachel Tarley from the Metro said Miranda is an acquired taste and that an episode can be a mixed bag. However, Tarley enjoyed the festive episode of series 2, saying "Hart got away with a lot of the more irritating qualities of her work, with help from the fantastic Patricia Hodge and Sally Phillips. Tonight was also the first we saw of Miranda's father, played by Tom Conti, who filled most of the episode's falling-over quota, so that Miranda finally remained pretty vertical throughout the episode." She added that Hart is "a great observer of everyday dilemmas" and the best thing of all is she left the door open for a third series. Dominic Cavendish of The Daily Telegraph called Miranda "the sitcom of the year", while Chris Harvey of the same newspaper said "The truth is, pretty much every time Miranda turns and looks at the camera, I burst out laughing. And even when her slapstick is so obvious it wouldn't confuse a small child [..] I still laugh. Even when I'm trying not to. Even when I really, really don't want to." Meanwhile, Catherine Gee said the show was a flop and listed six reasons why, which included unoriginal jokes, Hart's asides to the camera and the show retaining "the worst aspects of the sitcoms of yesteryear."

The opening episode of the third series became one of the most watched shows in the UK over the Christmas period, attracting a total audience of over 11.5 million viewers. For The Telegraph, Michael Deacon compares the programme to a childish Christmas panto, finally adding, "Perhaps I’m just getting old. I’m sure I’d have loved this show when I was six." Keith Watson, writing for Metro, says the series three finale is a "great end to an up-to-scratch season, Miranda never fails to cheer up an evening, reminding many of us that we aren’t alone in the everyday awkward situations that we might find ourselves in – to some extent, anyway."

George Entwistle stated, "Miranda's been a tremendous hit with audiences on BBC Two and I'm very glad she's let us persuade her to move to BBC One, where we believe we can build an even bigger following for her multi-award-winning show. BBC Two has done an exceptional job of supporting and nurturing Miranda over a number of years and I'm certain she'll be equally well looked after at BBC One."

== Awards and nominations ==
| Year | Event | Category | Nominee(s) | Result | Reference |
|---|---|---|---|---|---|
| 2010 | Royal Television Society Awards | Comedy Performance | Miranda Hart | Won | |
| 2010 | Royal Television Society Awards | Scripted Comedy | Miranda | Nominated | |
| 2010 | Royal Television Society Awards | Comedy Writing | Miranda Hart, James Cary and Richard Hurst | Nominated | |
| 2010 | British Academy Television Awards | Best Scripted Comedy | Miranda Hart | Nominated | |
| 2010 | British Academy Television Awards | Best Female Comedy Performance | Miranda Hart | Nominated | |
| 2010 | Monte-Carlo Television Festival | Best Actress | Miranda Hart | Nominated | |
| 2010 | Monte-Carlo Television Festival | Best Actress | Patricia Hodge | Nominated | |
| 2010 | Broadcast Awards | Best Comedy Programme | Miranda | Nominated | |
| 2011 | British Comedy Awards | Best New British TV Comedy | Miranda | Won | |
| 2011 | British Comedy Awards | Best TV Comedy Actress | Miranda Hart | Won | |
| 2011 | British Comedy Awards | People's Choice Award for the King or Queen of Comedy | Miranda Hart | Won | |
| 2011 | British Comedy Awards | Best Sitcom | Miranda | Nominated | |
| 2011 | Royal Television Society Awards | Best Scripted Comedy | Miranda | Won | |
| 2011 | Royal Television Society Awards | Best Comedy Performance | Miranda Hart | Won | |
| 2011 | Royal Television Society Craft & Design Awards | Production Design – Entertainment & Non Drama Production | Harry Banks | Won | |
| 2011 | 37th Broadcasting Press Guild Awards | Best Comedy Show | Miranda | Won | |
| 2011 | British Academy Television Craft Awards | Best Director | Juliet May | Nominated | |
| 2011 | British Academy Television Awards | Best Female Comedy Performance | Miranda Hart | Nominated | |
| 2011 | British Academy Television Awards | YouTube Audience Award | Miranda | Nominated | |
| 2013 | British Academy Television Awards | Best Female Performance in a Comedy Programme | Miranda Hart | Nominated | |
| 2016 | British Academy Television Awards | Best Female Performance in a Comedy Programme | Miranda Hart | Nominated | |

== Home media ==
| DVD title | Release date (individual sets) | | | Features |
| DVD title | Region 2 (UK) | Region 2 (DE) | Region 4 | Features |
|---|---|---|---|---|
| Series 1 | 15 November 2010 | 7 November 2014 | 6 May 2010 | 6 episodes; 1 disc (UK & Australia); 2 discs (Germany); 175 minutes; English Dolby Digital 2.0 (UK, Germany & Australia); Deutsch Dolby Digital 2.0 (Germany); English subtitles (UK & Australia); 1.78:1 (16:9) aspect ratio; Distribution: Channel 4 DVD (UK); Edel (Germany); Roadshow Entertainment (Australia); Rating: BBFC: 15; FSK: 6; ACB: PG; Special features: Behind the Scenes; The Set Tour with Miranda; Introducing the Cast; Out Takes |
| Series 2 | 7 November 2011 | 27 February 2015 | 15 September 2011 | 6 episodes; 1 disc (UK & Australia); 2 discs (Germany); 174 minutes; English Dolby Digital 2.0 (UK, Germany & Australia); Deutsch Dolby Digital 2.0 (Germany); English subtitles (UK & Australia); 1.78:1 (16:9) aspect ratio; Distribution: Channel 4 DVD (UK); Edel (Germany); Roadshow Entertainment (Australia); Rating: BBFC: 12; FSK: 6; ACB: PG; Special features: Miranda Hart interviewing cast, friends and family – original BBC red button material including interviews with Sally Phillips, Frank Skinner, and Miranda's real-life Mum |
| Series 3 | 4 November 2013 | TBA | 5 June 2013 | 6 episodes; 1 disc (UK & Australia); 174 minutes; English Dolby Digital 2.0 (UK & Australia); English subtitles (UK & Australia); 1.78:1 (16:9) aspect ratio; Distribution: Channel 4 DVD (UK); Roadshow Entertainment (Australia); Rating: BBFC: 12; ACB: PG; Special features: Behind the Scenes |
| The Finale | 26 January 2015 | TBA | TBA | 2 episodes; 1 disc; 60 minutes; English Dolby Digital 2.0; English subtitles; 1.78:1 (16:9) aspect ratio; Distribution: 2Entertain (UK); Rating: BBFC: 12; Special features: |
| DVD title | Release date (multiple/other sets) | | | Features |
| DVD title | Region 2 (UK) | | Region 4 | Features |
| Series 1 & 2 | 7 November 2011 | | No release | 12 episodes; 2 discs; 349 minutes; See individual releases for all other information |
| Series 1, 2 & 3 | 4 November 2013 | | 20 November 2013 | 18 episodes; 3 discs; 523 minutes; See individual releases for all other information |
| Christmas! | 24 November 2014 | | No release | 2 episodes (Series 2, Episode 6 & Series 3, Episode 1); 1 discs; 60 minutes; English Dolby Digital 2.0; English subtitles; 1.78:1 (16:9) aspect ratio; Distribution: Channel 4 DVD (UK); Rating: BBFC: 12 |
| The Complete Boxset | 26 October 2015 | | TBA | 20 episodes; 4 discs; 583 minutes; See individual releases for all other information |

== Remake ==
In August 2018, it was reported that The Big Bang Theory star Jim Parsons was developing a U.S. remake for Warner Bros. Television. Hart would be involved in developing the remake as a producer, but it was not revealed if she would star as well. The series was ordered by Fox on 19 September 2019 and titled as Call Me Kat, in which Mayim Bialik would also star. It premiered on 3 January 2021. It was cancelled on 4 May 2023.

In August 2021 it was announced that there would be a German adaptation of Miranda called Ruby, with Anna Böger in the lead role. It was released on ZDFNeo on 13 September 2022, and co-produced by BBC Studios Germany.
