= Bo Poraj =

British-Polish actor (born 1973)

- Occupation: Actor
- Years active: 1995–present
- Spouse: Natasha Little (m. 2003)
- Children: 2

Bohdan "Bo" Poraj-Pstrokonski is a British-Polish actor, known for his film and television appearances, including the BBC sitcom Miranda.

== Career ==
Between 2012 and 2014, Poraj played the role of Mike Jackford in the BBC sitcom Miranda. In 2013, he made a guest appearance in Vicious. In 2014, he played the role of Bonacieux in the BBC series The Musketeers. Poraj has also written five to seven episodes of Doctors, as well as three episodes of EastEnders. Poraj also appeared in an episode of Doctors in December 2022 as Gregory Painter.

== Personal life ==
Poraj's parents are Polish. They moved to the United Kingdom before he was born.

Poraj studied at RADA. He lives in Loughton, Essex, with his wife, actress Natasha Little. The couple have two sons.

== Theatre ==
Year	Title	Role	Director	Theatre
2017	Gloria	Lorin	Michael Longhurst	Hampstead Theatre

== Filmography ==
Year	Name	Role
1996	No Bananas	Witold Wesolowski
1997	Casualty	Peter Mitchell
1997	Underworld	Dr. Stanforth
1997	Wycliffe	Richard Petheric
1997	Caught in the Act	Tarquin
2001	Enigma	Pinker
2003	Killing Hitler	Polish SOE Agent
2003, 2009, 2022	Doctors	Paul Guillemot, Gordon Price, Lee Wharton, Gregory Painter
2004	Murder Prevention	James Gibson
2004	The Queen of Sheba's Pearls	Teacher
2004	NY-LON	Seth
2004	EastEnders	Andrew Warrick
2004	D-Day 6.6.1944	Lt. George Lane
2005	The Golden Hour	Rick Peters
2005	The Inspector Lynley Mysteries	Martin
2005	The Search For The Northwest Passage	Captain Francis Crozier
2006	Stormbreaker	Soldier 1
2007	Holby City	Malcolm Stewart
2007	Waking the Dead	Viktor Cyrak
2009	The Thick of It	Journalist
2009	The Boat That Rocked	Fredericks
2012–2014	Miranda	Michael Jackford
2013	Vicious	Man in Club
2014–2015	The Musketeers	Bonacieux
2022	Newark Newark	Dariusz
2023	Fifteen-Love	Jeremy Clough
2024	We Were the Lucky Ones	Mr. Nowak
2025	The Yellow Tie	Philharmonics Manager
2025	Missing You	Jim Mattison
2025	I, Jack Wright	Martin Ward
2026	Falling	Tony
2026	X-Men 97	Exodus
