= List of Drew Carey's Improv-A-Ganza episodes =

Drew Carey's Improv-A-Ganza is an improvisational comedy television program that aired in the United States on the Game Show Network (GSN). A total of 40 episodes were produced during the series' only season in 2011.

== Episode table ==
No.	Performers	Original release date
1	Jonathan Mangum, Colin Mochrie, Greg Proops, Brad Sherwood & Ryan Stiles	April 11, 2011
Games Performed: Song to an Audience Member, Moving People, Freeze Tag, Kick It! Guest Starring: Wayne Brady
2	Jeff Davis, Chip Esten, Colin Mochrie, Greg Proops & Ryan Stiles	April 12, 2011
Games Performed: Greatest Hits, Bob's Call, Options, Fairy Tale Guest Starring: Charlie Sheen
3	Jeff Davis, Chip Esten, Kathy Kinney, Colin Mochrie, Brad Sherwood & Ryan Stiles	April 13, 2011
Games Performed: Sound Effects, Greatest Hits, Options, Playbook
4	Jonathan Mangum, Colin Mochrie, Greg Proops, Brad Sherwood & Ryan Stiles	April 14, 2011
Games Performed: Freeze Tag, New Choice, Moving People, Song to an Audience Member Guest Starring: Wayne Brady
5	Heather Anne Campbell, Jeff Davis, Chip Esten, Jonathan Mangum & Ryan Stiles	April 15, 2011
Games Performed: Greatest Hits, First Date, Forward/Reverse, New Choice
6	Jeff Davis, Chip Esten, Colin Mochrie, Greg Proops & Ryan Stiles	April 18, 2011
Games Performed: Freeze Tag, Sound Effects, Two-Headed Expert, Greatest Hits
7	Jonathan Mangum, Colin Mochrie, Greg Proops, Brad Sherwood & Ryan Stiles	April 19, 2011
Games Performed: Sound Effects, Greatest Hits, Question This!, Options Guest Starring: Wayne Brady
8	Jeff Davis, Chip Esten, Jonathan Mangum, Greg Proops & Ryan Stiles	April 20, 2011
Games Performed: Song to an Audience Member, Options, Forward/Reverse, Sentences
9	Heather Anne Campbell, Jeff Davis, Chip Esten, Jonathan Mangum & Ryan Stiles	April 21, 2011
Games Performed: Moving People, Question This!, Sound Effects, Sentences
10	Kathy Kinney, Jonathan Mangum, Sean Masterson, Greg Proops & Ryan Stiles	April 22, 2011
Games Performed: Sentences, New Choice, Mousetraps
11	Heather Anne Campbell, Jeff Davis, Chip Esten, Jonathan Mangum & Ryan Stiles	April 25, 2011
Games Performed: Freeze Tag, Song to an Audience Member, Options, Two-Headed Expert
12	Jeff Davis, Chip Esten, Jonathan Mangum, Greg Proops & Ryan Stiles	April 26, 2011
Games Performed: Freeze Tag, Sentences, First Date, Song to an Audience Member
13	Jonathan Mangum, Colin Mochrie, Greg Proops, Brad Sherwood & Ryan Stiles	April 27, 2011
Games Performed: Forward/Reverse, Playbook, Greatest Hits, Sound Effects Guest Starring: Wayne Brady
14	Jeff Davis, Chip Esten, Kathy Kinney, Colin Mochrie, Brad Sherwood & Ryan Stiles	April 28, 2011
Games Performed: Freeze Tag, Song to an Audience Member, Bob's Call, New Choice
15	Kathy Kinney, Jonathan Mangum, Sean Masterson, Greg Proops & Ryan Stiles	April 29, 2011
Games Performed: Options, Two-Headed Expert, Freeze Tag, Song to an Audience Member
16	Heather Anne Campbell, Jeff Davis, Chip Esten, Jonathan Mangum & Ryan Stiles	May 2, 2011
Games Performed: Options, Two-Headed Expert, Song to an Audience Member, Fairy Tale
17	Heather Anne Campbell, Jeff Davis, Chip Esten, Jonathan Mangum & Ryan Stiles	May 3, 2011
Games Performed: Song to an Audience Member, Sound Effects, Sentences, New Choice
18	Jeff Davis, Chip Esten, Colin Mochrie, Greg Proops & Ryan Stiles	May 4, 2011
Games Performed: Moving People, New Choice, Question This!, Fairy Tale
19	Jonathan Mangum, Colin Mochrie, Greg Proops, Brad Sherwood & Ryan Stiles	May 5, 2011
Games Performed: Options, New Choice, Two-Headed Expert, Sentences Guest Starring: Wayne Brady
20	Kathy Kinney, Jonathan Mangum, Sean Masterson, Greg Proops & Ryan Stiles	May 6, 2011
Games Performed: Sound Effects, Kick It!, Forward/Reverse, Mousetraps
21	Heather Anne Campbell, Jeff Davis, Chip Esten, Jonathan Mangum & Ryan Stiles	May 9, 2011
Games Performed: Options, Forward/Reverse, Bob's Call, Greatest Hits
22	Jeff Davis, Chip Esten, Jonathan Mangum, Greg Proops & Ryan Stiles	May 10, 2011
Games Performed: New Choice, Options, Moving People, Greatest Hits
23	Jeff Davis, Chip Esten, Kathy Kinney, Colin Mochrie, Brad Sherwood & Ryan Stiles	May 11, 2011
Games Performed: Two-Headed Expert, Freeze Tag, Sound Effects (with Fields and Kamer providing sound), Options Guest Starring: Rich Fields & Steve Kamer
24	Heather Anne Campbell, Jeff Davis, Chip Esten, Jonathan Mangum & Ryan Stiles	May 12, 2011
Games Performed: New Choice, Song to an Audience Member, Freeze Tag, Sentences
25	Jeff Davis, Chip Esten, Kathy Kinney, Colin Mochrie, Brad Sherwood & Ryan Stiles	May 13, 2011
Games Performed: Song to an Audience Member, Sentences, New Choice, Greatest Hits
26	Jeff Davis, Chip Esten, Jonathan Mangum, Greg Proops & Ryan Stiles	May 16, 2011
Games Performed: Moving People, Sound Effects, Freeze Tag, Greatest Hits
27	Heather Anne Campbell, Jeff Davis, Chip Esten, Jonathan Mangum & Ryan Stiles	May 17, 2011
Games Performed: Bob's Call, Forward/Reverse, Options, Greatest Hits
28	Jeff Davis, Chip Esten, Kathy Kinney, Colin Mochrie, Brad Sherwood & Ryan Stiles	May 18, 2011
Games Performed: Song to an Audience Member, Moving People (featuring guest stars as the movers), New Choice, Kick It! Guest Starring: Rachel Reynolds, Manuela Arbeláez & Gwendolyn Osborne
29	Jeff Davis, Chip Esten, Colin Mochrie, Greg Proops & Ryan Stiles	May 19, 2011
Games Performed: Song to an Audience Member, Question This!, Freeze Tag, Sentences
30	Jeff Davis, Chip Esten, Kathy Kinney, Colin Mochrie, Brad Sherwood & Ryan Stiles	May 20, 2011
Games Performed: Sentences, First Date, Sound Effects, Greatest Hits
31	Jeff Davis, Chip Esten, Kathy Kinney, Colin Mochrie & Brad Sherwood	May 23, 2011
Games Performed: Greatest Hits, Sound Effects, Sentences, Two-Headed Expert
32	Jeff Davis, Chip Esten, Kathy Kinney, Colin Mochrie & Brad Sherwood	May 24, 2011
Games Performed: Greatest Hits, Sentences, Bob's Call, Moving People
33	Jeff Davis, Chip Esten, Kathy Kinney, Colin Mochrie & Brad Sherwood	May 25, 2011
Games Performed: Song to an Audience Member, Options, Freeze Tag, New Choice
34	Jeff Davis, Chip Esten, Kathy Kinney, Colin Mochrie & Brad Sherwood	May 26, 2011
Games Performed: Song to an Audience Member, First Date, Freeze Tag, New Choice
35	Jeff Davis, Chip Esten, Kathy Kinney, Greg Proops & Ryan Stiles	May 27, 2011
Games Performed: Two-Headed Expert, Song to an Audience Member, Freeze Tag, Forward/Reverse, Sentences
36	Jeff Davis, Chip Esten, Kathy Kinney, Colin Mochrie & Brad Sherwood	May 30, 2011
Games Performed: Song to an Audience Member, New Choice, Freeze Tag, Two-Headed Expert
37	Jeff Davis, Chip Esten, Kathy Kinney, Greg Proops & Ryan Stiles	May 31, 2011
Games Performed: New Choice, Song to an Audience Member, Question This!, Greatest Hits
38	Jeff Davis, Chip Esten, Kathy Kinney, Greg Proops & Ryan Stiles	June 1, 2011
Games Performed: Moving People, Sound Effects, Freeze Tag, Bob's Call
39	Jeff Davis, Chip Esten, Kathy Kinney, Colin Mochrie & Brad Sherwood	June 2, 2011
Games Performed: Greatest Hits, Sentences, Options, Sound Effects
40	Jeff Davis, Chip Esten, Kathy Kinney, Greg Proops & Ryan Stiles	June 3, 2011
Games Performed: Greatest Hits, First Date, Sound Effects, New Choice
