= Colin Mochrie =

Canadian comedic actor (born 1957)

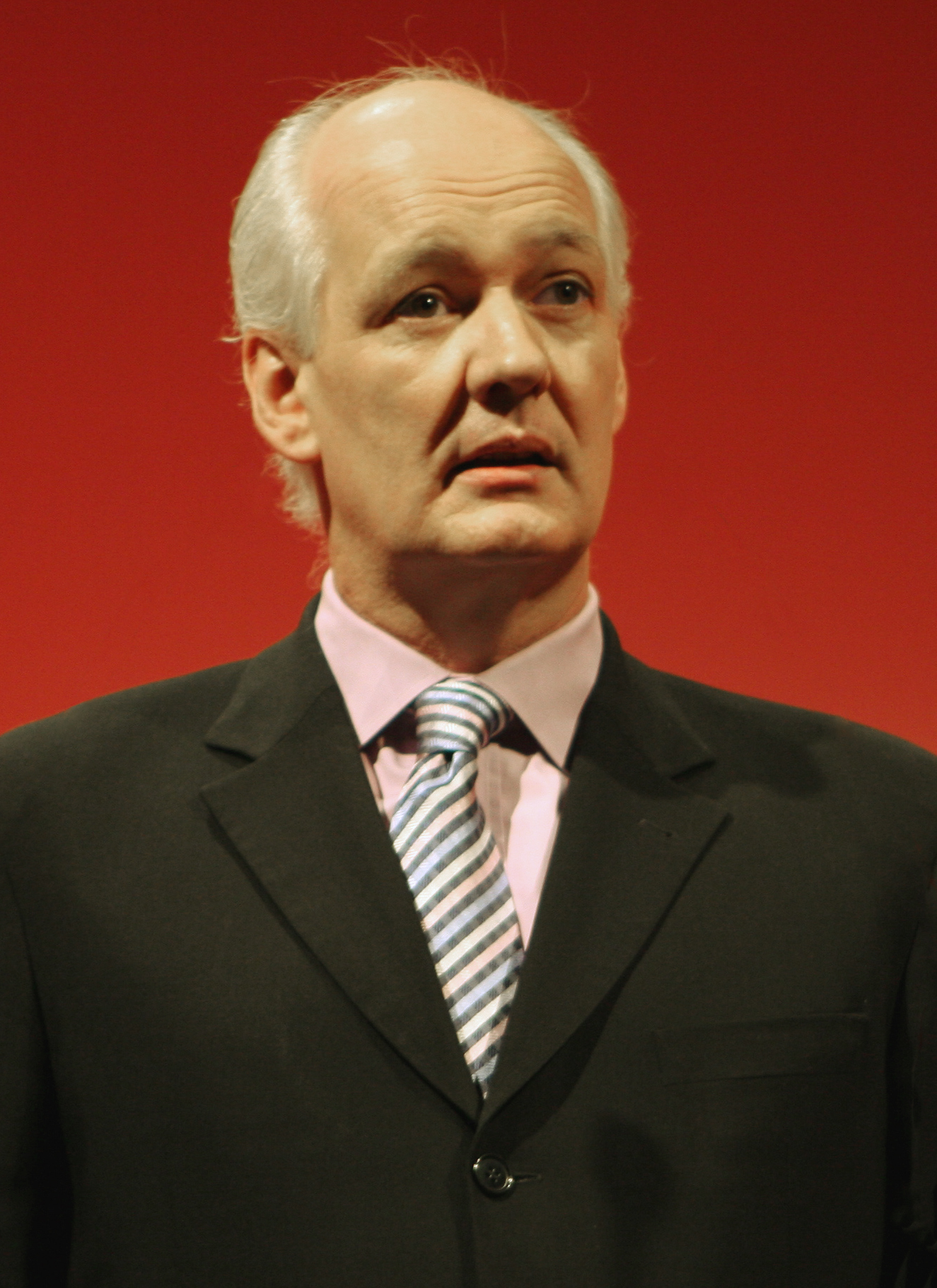
- Mochrie in 2008
- Born: Colin Andrew Mochrie; November 30, 1957 (age 68); Kilmarnock, Ayrshire, Scotland
- Citizenship: Canadian
- Education: Studio 58
- Occupations: Actor; comedian
- Notable work: British and American versions of Whose Line Is It Anyway?; This Hour Has 22 Minutes (2001–2003)
- Spouse: Debra McGrath (m. 1989)
- Children: 1
- Relatives: Munro Chambers (nephew)

Comedy career
- Years active: 1977–present
- Medium: Stand-up comedy, television
- Genre: Improv comedy
- Website: www.colinmochrie.com

Colin Andrew Mochrie (/ˈmɒkri/; born November 30, 1957) is a Scottish-born Canadian actor and improv comedian, best known for his appearances on the British and American versions of the improvisational TV show Whose Line Is It Anyway?, having appeared on every American Whose Line? episode throughout both its runs.

Mochrie honed his comedic talents with Vancouver's TheatreSports League and Toronto's Second City theatre. He has appeared in dozens of television series and films, as well as theatrical shows. With his wife, comedian Debra McGrath, Mochrie co-wrote, co-produced, and co-starred in the Canadian sitcoms Getting Along Famously and She's the Mayor. He has written for numerous other series and events and wrote and performed for the White House Correspondents' Association dinner.

Mochrie's work has been recognized with numerous awards, including two Canadian Comedy Awards, a Gemini Award, and a Writers Guild of Canada award. He was named Canadian Comedy Person of the Year at the 2013 Canadian Comedy Awards.

== Early life ==
Colin Mochrie was born in Kilmarnock, Scotland, the oldest of three children. His father was an airline maintenance executive. He was shy as a child, stating that neighbours would have commented that he "watched way too much television". In 1964, when Mochrie was seven years old, his family immigrated to Canada. They first settled in a neighbourhood just outside Montreal, Quebec, and five years later moved to Vancouver, British Columbia.

Mochrie attended Killarney Secondary School, where he was a self-proclaimed loner who wanted to become a marine biologist. He was persuaded by a friend to try out for a play titled The Death and Life of Sneaky Fitch, in which Mochrie played the role of the undertaker. He was hooked when he got his first laugh, which inspired him to pursue a career in entertainment. After graduating from high school as valedictorian, Mochrie attended the Studio 58 theatre school at Langara College for three years, where he discovered the art of improvisational comedy.

== Career ==
=== Improvisational beginnings ===
Upon graduation from Studio 58, Mochrie found his first line of work as a member of the Vancouver TheatreSports League. He started working with the group in 1980. Fame was slow to start, as Mochrie "literally had to pull people out of McDonald's to come see the shows". Mochrie originally had parts in plays while working for the group, but working for the TheatreSports League eventually became a full-time job for Mochrie. During this time, he met fellow improvisor Ryan Stiles. He was visiting a mutual friend in New Zealand when Stiles was performing comedy at Punchlines. After the two met, Stiles and Mochrie began working at TheatreSports together. Though it has been stated that the two met while members of The Second City, the pair were already close friends, according to both Mochrie and Susan Trimbee, the former manager of The Second City Toronto (1985–1988).

Following Expo '86, Mochrie ended his tenure with the Vancouver TheatreSports League and moved to Toronto. Once there, Mochrie auditioned for The Second City comedy troupe, where Stiles was working. He began performing with the Second City National Touring Company, where he met Debra McGrath, who was the director of the company at the time. The two married in 1989 and had a child, Kinley, in 1990.

Mochrie worked for The Second City for three years, co-writing and starring in three productions and directing three seasons of their national touring company. As a member of the touring company, he performed in many skits, including one where he and two others are at a bar, and they help him to rewrite an anecdote from his youth involving his father taking him to a baseball game, and a five-minute version of a James Bond movie, complete with Mochrie in a downhill ski chase and parachuting off a cliff.

=== 1988–1998 ===
Upon finishing his stint with Second City in 1988, Mochrie's career was quiet for a while as he spent some time with his new wife and child. In 1989, he auditioned for the new British Channel 4 improv show Whose Line Is It Anyway? but did not make the cut. Mochrie has stated that the audition was a good learning experience because while improv is about setting other people up to be funny, auditions should be about giving yourself the chance to stand out. He moved to Los Angeles the following year but again auditioned for the British Whose Line, this time making the cut and being asked to fly to London. He appeared on one episode and was again let go. The third time Mochrie auditioned, he earned a regular spot on the show. He spent seven years as a regular on the UK version of Whose Line Is It Anyway? and remained a cast member until the show's end in 1998.

After the British version of the show ended its run, Mochrie joined the American version of Whose Line Is It Anyway? hosted by Drew Carey on ABC. He was brought on alongside Ryan Stiles, who was also a regular member of the UK cast. Mochrie appeared on every episode from its debut in August 1998 to its finale in 2006. He noted his favourite games as "Scenes From a Hat", where he would have to act out scenes based on suggestions by audience members, and "Whose Line", where he and Stiles would act out a scene and have to add in lines written on pieces of paper. He believed his weak spots were the musical segments and the "Hoedown" game, which he said was the only time during the show when he felt total fear. Mochrie, who cannot sing, usually spoke his lines instead of singing them.

Mochrie's co-stars on the show frequently mocked him for being Canadian and for his receding hairline. In the UK version, however, Mochrie still had a fairly full head of hair very early on, and the bald jokes were directed at the UK host, Clive Anderson. In the American version, Mochrie would often perform the female role in certain frequently performed skits, such as "Whose Line" and "Two Line Vocabulary". In the few times he played the man in the scene, the producers were making further fun of his baldness (e.g., Colin was Samson, and Ryan was Delilah, and Samson had lost all his strength because Delilah had cut off his hair).

According to Mochrie's agent, Jeff Andrews, during the show's run, Mochrie was better known in Canada as a "commercial king", performing as characters such as the Detergent Crusader for Sunlight detergent. In March 2005, a Nabisco advertising campaign starred Mochrie as the "Snack Fairy", in which he wears a ballet tutu over ordinary slacks and a shirt. At the end of each commercial, he declares, "Snack happy!" and waves his scepter with a smile.

Mochrie remained active elsewhere during his tenure as a Whose Line cast member. In early 1994, he played the role of Mike Brady in a musical version of The Brady Bunch, directed by fellow Second City member Bruce Pirrie. In the production, Mochrie plays the character as caffeine-fuelled, jittery, and neurotic, an exaggeration of the Mike Brady television character, who often had a coffee in his hand on the show. Shortly before his move to the US version of Whose Line in 1998, Mochrie starred in the Canadian comedy series Supertown Challenge as the host of game shows, which the show spoofed. He also appeared in several episodes of the Canadian improvisational comedy series Improv Heaven and Hell.

=== 1999–2009 ===
In an interview, it was revealed that in 1999 Mochrie worked on the Miloš Forman film Man on the Moon, but his scenes were deleted from the final movie. Mochrie was a guest star in three episodes of The Drew Carey Show: "She's Gotta Have It" (1999), "Drew Live" (1999), and "Drew Live II" (2001). He also appeared on Nickelodeon's Figure It Out as a celebrity guest panelist; in one segment of the show, he was slimed. He had a one-liner in the "Bad Hare Day" episode of Goosebumps, and he made special guest appearances in several episodes of The Red Green Show.

From 2001 through 2002, Mochrie co-starred in the Canadian comedy series Blackfly for the series' two seasons. He appeared in This Hour Has 22 Minutes on CBC Television from 2001 through 2003, and on the WB Television Network series Drew Carey's Green Screen Show in 2004.

In 2003, Mochrie, Leslie Nielsen, Wayne Gretzky, and Roy Halladay appeared in print and television advertisements to encourage people to visit Toronto after the SARS outbreak that struck the city.

In May 2004, he hosted a tongue-in-cheek guide to surviving animal attacks on Animal Planet known as Wild Survival Guide. He has appeared in a commercial supporting Habitat For Humanity. He appeared briefly in a commercial for Buckley's Cough Syrup, and he was featured in a commercial for New York Fries, manning a steamroller. He appeared on The Tonight Show with Jay Leno as the superhero Overly Sensitive Man (inspired by Whose Line).

By 2004, Mochrie was appearing in so many media spots that a new Canadian television series, Corner Gas, made light of it by having him do a cameo appearance in the tenth episode. In 2005, Mochrie appeared in "Burnt Toast", a series of eight comedic mini-operas, each depicting a different stage of a romantic relationship in a contemporary setting, produced by Canada's Rhombus Media. He also appeared in an episode of The Surreal Gourmet. Along with Rosie O'Donnell, Mochrie hosts a video introduction to a tour of the bakery located in the Pacific Wharf area of Disney California Adventure Park. In the video, he helps explain how sourdough bread is made. On December 25, 2005, the Canadian Broadcasting Corporation premièred the TV movie The Magical Gathering. Mochrie starred in the film and his daughter, Kinley, co-starred as Mochrie's character at a younger age.

Mochrie starred in Getting Along Famously in 2006. In February 2007, he made a guest appearance as a priest in the seventh episode of Little Mosque on the Prairie, a Canadian television comedy series.

On March 28, 2007, Mochrie and his Whose Line costar Brad Sherwood hosted part of the Press Correspondents' Dinner with the President. At that event, Sherwood and Mochrie featured Deputy White House Chief of Staff Karl Rove rapping. Rove's only line was "MC Rove". On August 29, 2007, it was announced that Mochrie would host the Canadian version of the game show Are You Smarter than a 5th Grader?. The first of five episodes aired on October 25, 2007. As a result, Mochrie became the fifth member of the American Whose Line? cast to become a game show host, after colleagues Brad Sherwood (The Dating Game and The Big Moment), Greg Proops (Vs., Head Games and Rendez-View), Wayne Brady (Don't Forget the Lyrics! and Let's Make a Deal), and Drew Carey (Power of 10 and The Price Is Right).

The image of Mochrie's face is used extensively in Animutation, a style of Flash animation. Neil Cicierega, the creator of Animutation, would place Mochrie in almost every Animutation he made, making the inclusion of him in Animutation somewhat of a running gag. Mochrie is aware of his status among Animutation artists and fans, having been quoted, "It was very odd when I first saw the animutations. Obviously, the animators are more than a little crazy, but I am very proud of my standing in the animutation arena and hope that someday I can make millions off of it".

=== 2010–present ===
In 2010, Mochrie acted in the Canadian television sitcom She's the Mayor, which debuted in 2011. On July 19, 2010, Mochrie starred as the divorce lawyer working on the case of Spinner and Emma in Degrassi Takes Manhattan.

In 2011, Mochrie appeared as a regular cast member on Drew Carey's Improv-A-Ganza on GSN. In 2012, Mochrie starred in the ABC improv comedy series Trust Us with Your Life. He wrote a short-story collection, Not Quite the Classics, after his agent encouraged him to write a book. It was first published by Viking Canada in 2013. Based on the improv game "First Line, Last Line", it takes the first and last lines of twelve famous novels and rewrites the middle portion into a different story.

Mochrie returned for the CW network's revival of Whose Line Is It Anyway? in the summer of 2013. He had a recurring role in the short-lived television comedy series Working the Engels.

In 2017, Mochrie made a cameo appearance, complete with his trademark dry humour, as Ralph Fellows, a hotel detective, in an episode of the Canadian detective TV series Murdoch Mysteries.

In 2020, Mochrie hosted Mass Hysterical: A Comedic Cantata, a webcast collaboration between Second City alumni and the Toronto Symphony Orchestra which presented a comedic history of the use of classical and liturgical music in the church, for which he received a Canadian Screen Award nomination for Best Lead Performance in a Web Program or Series at the 10th Canadian Screen Awards in 2022.

Mochrie has appeared on the revival of the sketch comedy series The Kids in the Hall, which was released on Amazon Prime Video on May 13, 2022. Mochrie co-created Hyprov, a comedy show that is a fusion of stage hypnosis and improvisation, alongside hypnotist Asad Mecci and often co-stars as the improvisational comedian.

=== Ongoing two-man show with Brad Sherwood ===
Mochrie and Whose Line co-star Brad Sherwood have intermittently toured North America as a two-man stage show since 2002. Initially called "An Evening with Colin and Brad", they played primarily in small theatre venues. A DVD of their performances, "Colin & Brad: Two Man Group", was released on March 8, 2011.

As of 2018, Mochrie and Sherwood have continued their performances, billed as the "Scared Scriptless Tour", and are playing in larger venues such as the Sydney Opera House and London's Royal Albert Hall.

== Personal life ==
Mochrie lives in Toronto with his wife, Canadian actress Debra McGrath. Since their marriage on January 8, 1989, Mochrie and his wife have welcomed a daughter, Kinley Mochrie. In 2017, with her permission, Mochrie revealed on Twitter that Kinley is transgender. In 2018, after Mochrie posted a picture with his wife and daughter on Facebook wishing her a happy birthday, he received comments from trolls. He responded by saying in a post the following day, "Thanks to the fans of this page for being supportive and human. To the trolls, my thoughts and prayers to your body for losing its mind and soul so tragically". When Mochrie competed on LOL: Last One Laughing Canada in 2022, he played for Rainbow Camp, an affirming summer camp program for LGBTQ youth in Thessalon.

Mochrie is related to Canadian actor Munro Chambers by marriage. In a 2010 interview, Chambers stated:

"I could say many things... my uncle, for one thing, is Colin Mochrie. He's been my inspiration getting into the industry. He's my uncle-in-law; his wife is my dad's cousin. My dad and his cousin, they were kind of like brother and sister growing up, so he's my uncle by law. We have a good relationship".

== Filmography ==
=== Film ===
Year	Title	Role	Notes
1983	Spacehunter: Adventures in the Forbidden Zone	Guard	Uncredited
1985	Rainbow War		Short film
1989	The January Man	Pat	
1997	The Real Blonde	Renny	
1999	Road to Nowhere	Tom Berman	
2000	Lucky Numbers	Jack	
2001	The Midnight Hour	Fred Dennis	Uncredited
2001	Totally Blonde	Vulcan / Agent / Comic / Drunk	
2001	Truth in Advertising	John Stevenson	Short
2002	Jane White Is Sick & Twisted	Barney	
2002	Do It for Uncle Manny	Maitre'd	
2002	Expecting	Gary	
2002	The Tuxedo	Gallery Owner	
2003	Turnbuckle	Connor O'Connor	
2003	Bitter Jester	Himself	
2005	Burnt Toast: The Argument	Husband	Short
2006	Cathedral Pine	Dr. Brock Cosby	
2006	Young Triffie	Sgt. Bill O'Mara	
2007	Surviving My Mother	Rick	
2007	I Do & I Don't	Bagpiper	
2007	Let's All Hate Toronto	Himself	
2008	Inconceivable	Andy Stephenson	
2008	Kit Kittredge: An American Girl	Mr. Pennington	
2009	Puck Hogs	Irv Mason	
2010	GravyTrain	Mayor Chester Chubbins	
2011	In a Family Way	Oscar	Direct-to-video
2011	Mulroney: The Opera	Jean Chrétien	
2011	Ecstasy	Father Brian	
2011	Ron Sparks Celebrity Roast of Colin Mochrie	Himself	Direct-to-video
2012	Please Kill Mr. Know It All	Talk Show Host	
2012	The Train	Gordon	Short
2013	Hardsell	Ben	Short
2014	The Anniversary	Carl	
2014	Beethoven's Treasure Tail	Dr. Kelp	Direct-to-video
2015	Business Ethics	Higgins	Short
2015	After the Ball	Colin Frost	
2015	Night Cries	The Hat	
2019	Boys vs. Girls	Roger	
2019	Astronaut	Interviewer	
2019	Canadian Strain	Jack Banting	
2020	Thomas and the Magic Railroad: 20th Anniversary Celebration	Burnett Stone	
2021	Drifting Snow	John	
2021	Maybe There's a Tree	Reggie Deuce	
2021	Ankle Biters	Detective Morton	
2022	Junior's Giant		Producer only
2023	Hey, Viktor!	Craig Broner	
2023	How to Ruin the Holidays	Dad	
2024	Villains Inc.	Harold	
2025	Magnetosphere	Gil	

=== Television ===
Year	Title	Role	Notes
1990	The Campbells	Farmer	
1990	The World's Oldest Living Bridesmaid	Outdoor Bar Waiter	TV movie Uncredited
1990	My Talk Show	Guest Star	
1991–1999	Whose Line Is It Anyway?	Himself	United Kingdom version 71 episodes
1995	Kung Fu: The Legend Continues	Bus Driver	Season 3 episode 4: "The Return of Sing Ling"
1996	Gotti	Sound operator	TV movie
1996	Goosebumps	Heavy	Uncredited; Season 2 episode 4: "Bad Hare Day"
1998	Stories from My Childhood	Himself	Voice; 2 episodes
1998	Once a Thief	O'Grady	Episode 15: "True Blue"
1998–2007, 2013–2024	Whose Line Is It Anyway?	Himself	United States version
1998–2000	Supertown Challenge	Dick Powell	Writer (3 episodes)
1999	George and Martha	Oscar/Bud Chuckles	Voice; Main role (26 episodes)
1999	Shelly Fisher	Mr. Niles	TV movie
1999	Show of Hearts	Himself	
1999	Improv Heaven and Hell	Himself	
1999	Figure It Out	Himself	Panelist
1999–2000	The Drew Carey Show	Eugene/Eugene Anderson	3 episodes
2000	The Outer Limits	Dale La Rose	Season 6 episode 10: "Down to Earth"
2000	Twas the Night Before Christmas	Himself	Christmas special
2000–2003	Seven Little Monsters	Two	Voice; Main role (49 episodes)
2001	Disney's California Adventure TV Special	Himself	
2001	Improv All Stars	Himself	TV special
2001	Hollywood Squares	Himself	Panelist; 10 episodes
2001	Cream of Comedy	Himself	Host
2001–2002	Blackfly	Cpl. Entwhistle	26 episodes
2001–2002	This Hour Has 22 Minutes	Anthony St. George/Various	3 episodes Writer
2002	Made in Canada	Frank Roy	Season 4 episode 10: "Alan's Brother"
2002	Pyramid	Himself	Celebrity contestant Episode dated December 27, 2002
2002–2003	Royal Canadian Air Farce	Queer Eye for the Al-Queda Guy	3 episodes
2003	The Sean Cullen Show	Himself	Episode 1: "Seán's First Show"
2003	Comedic Genius: The Work of Bernard Slade	Himself	Narrator
2003	I Love the '70s	Himself	
2003	This Hour Has 22 Minutes: New Year's Eve Special	—N/a	Writer
2004	Cirque du Soleil: Solstrom		Episode 10: "Winds of Courage"
2004	Corner Gas	Dave	Season 1 episode 10: "Comedy Night"
2004	The Red Green Show	Frank Kepke	2 episodes
2004	25 Years of Skinnamarink	Himself	
2004	I Love the '90s	Himself	
2004	The Magical Gathering	Himself	
2004	TV Guide Close Up: From Comedy Club to Primetime	Himself	
2004–2005	Drew Carey's Green Screen Show	Himself	12 episodes
2005	A Very Barry Christmas	Santa Claus	TV movie Voice
2005	Burnt Toast	Dougald	TV movie
2005	Getting Along Famously	Kip Delany	TV movie pilot Teleplay writer Executive producer
2005	I Love the '90s: Part Deux	Himself	
2005	Comedy Gold	Himself	TV short documentary
2005–2009	Winnipeg Comedy Festival	Himself	Host; Writer; 2 episodes
2006	Getting Along Famously	Kip Delaney	Main role Co-creator; Writer; Executive producer
2006	The Tonight Show with Jay Leno	Overly Sensitive Man	"#14.181" (Uncredited)
2006	Second City: First Family of Comedy	Himself	Mini-series documentary: "A College of Comedy" & "It Came from Melonville"
2007	Second City's Next Comedy Legend	Himself	"Kreskin vs. Sean" & "Outsmart, Outlast, Outmug"
2007	Are You Smarter Than a Canadian 5th Grader?	Himself / Host	
2007–2012	Little Mosque on the Prairie	Archdeacon Gladwin/Plastic Surgeon	"The Archdeacon Cometh" & "The Worst of Times"
2008	History Bites	Himself	Special: "Céline Dion"
2009	Hotbox		"#1.6" and "#1.13"
2009	Improv Monologue Project	Himself	
2009–2013	The Ron James Show	Barry Crosby/Mr. Douglas	5 episodes
2010	Love Letters	Andy	TV movie
2010	The Kids in the Hall: Death Comes to Town	Veterinarian	Mini-series; Episode 4: "Big City Smack Down"
2010	Degrassi Takes Manhattan	Larry	TV movie
2010	Men with Brooms		Episode 12: "How They Got Here"
2010	Making a Scene	Himself	
2010	Truth Mashup	Himself	Episode 2: "Canadian TV"
2010–2012	Wingin' It	Security Guard Bob/Security Guard	2 episodes
2011	She's the Mayor	Scott Hawkins	13 episodes
2011	Single White Spenny	Dr. Brickman	Episode 1: "Revenge Sex"
2011	Almost Heroes	Boyd	8 episodes
2011	Drew Carey's Improv-A-Ganza	Himself	21 episodes
2011	Long Story Short: CBC Turns 75	Himself	
2011	Colin & Brad: Two Man Group	Himself	
2012	Comedy Bar	Lionel	
2012	Sunshine Sketches of a Little Town	Judge Pepperleigh	TV movie
2012	Trust Us with Your Life	Himself	8 episodes
2012	The Casting Room	Himself	Episode: "Colin Mochrie"
2012–2013	Match Game	Himself	Panelist; 4 episodes
2013	Off2Kali Comedy	Himself	Season 1 episode 7: "Pick My Fake Indian Name!"
2013	Downton Abbey at 54 Below: Season 4, Episode 1 Sneak Peek	Julian Fellowes (Himself)	
2013	Satisfaction	Manager	Episode 12: "Daddy Issues"
2013	#7DaysLater	Colin	Episode 1: "Drama Queen"
2013	Fir Crazy	Gary Dixon	TV movie
2013	Call Me Fitz	Man in a Hot Dog Costume	2 episodes
2013	90210: 4ever	Himself	
2014	Working the Engels	Miles	Episode 1: "Pilot"
2014	Dark Rising	Nacelle "The Nefarious"	5 episodes
2014	Space Janitors	Wondor Kenway	Web series Season 3 episode 5: "Hope Day"
2014	Canada's Smartest Person	Himself	Linguistic Judge: "#1.1"
2014–2017	Annedroids	Mr. Cooper	Web series 5 episodes
2015	The Stanley Dynamic	Mailman	Season 1 episode 16: "The Stanley Student"
2015	Gaming Show (In My Parents' Garage)	Himself	Season episode 7: "Pong the Movie"
2015	Celebrity Name Game	Himself	Celebrity player 3 episodes
2016	Hart of America		Short
2017	But I'm Chris Jericho!	Himself	Season 2 episode 3: "Peace Out"
2017-	Murdoch Mysteries	Ralph Fellows	Recurring
2018	Let's Get Physical	Bill Vanslooten	Episode 8: "CAC Fight!"
2018	Liverspots and Astronots	Rossi	21 episodes
2018	The Mission	Ambassador Macdonald	TV movie
2019	Michelle's	Jerry	Web series Episode 2: "Lunch is for Troglodytes"
2019	Go Away, Unicorn!	Mr. Opus / Sensei Scotty / Scotty	Voice; 9 episodes
2019	Pete Samcras	Dad	Mini-series; 2 episodes
2019	Private Eyes	Ralph Duncan	Season 3 episode 12: "Glazed and Confused"
2019	Carter	Neil Jacott	Season 2 episode 1: "Harley Wears A Wig"
2020	Workin' Moms	Mr. Hall	Season 4 episode 2: "Black Sheep"
2021	TallBoyz	Himself	Season 2 episode 6: "All the Focus Is on the Diamonds"
2021	A Christmas Letter	Sandy Clause	TV movie
2022	LOL: Last One Laughing Canada	Himself	6 episodes
2022	Sloppy Jones	Frank Jones	Episode 1: "Over My Dad Body"
2022	The Kids in the Hall	Police Detective	Episode 8
2022	Baking All the Way	Mr. Weaver	TV movie
2023	Ted Lasso	Lanny	Voice; Season 3, episode 10: "International Break"
2024	Children Ruin Everything	Mr. Dongall	Season 4, Episode 7: "Ego"

== Awards and nominations ==
Mochrie has been nominated for five Canadian Comedy Awards and has won two. He has also won a Gemini Award and a Writers Guild of Canada award for This Hour Has 22 Minutes. In 2013, Mochrie was awarded Canadian Comedy Person of the Year at the Canadian Comedy Awards.

Colin Mochrie awards and nominations

Awards and nominations
Award	Wins	Nominations
Totals
ACTRA Awards	1	2
B-Movie Award	1	1
Canadian Comedy Awards	5	10
Gemini Awards	1	3
WGC Screenwriting Awards	1	1

Wins
9
Nominations
19

Year	Nominated work	Award	Category	Result
2000	Colin Mochrie – Whose Line Is It Anyway?	Canadian Comedy Awards	Best Male Improviser	Won
2001	Colin Mochrie – Whose Line Is It Anyway?	Canadian Comedy Awards	Best Male Performance – Television	Won
2002	Colin Mochrie – Jane White Is Sick & Twisted	B-Movie Award	Best B-Movie Hollywood Appearance or Cameo	Won
2002	This Hour Has 22 Minutes	WGC Screenwriting Awards	Best Script for TV Comedy or Variety	Won
2003	This Hour Has 22 Minutes – "New Years Even Special" with Greg Thomey, Mary Walsh, Cathy Jones, Mark Critch, Mark Farrell, Paul Mather, Peter McBain, and Kevin White	Canadian Comedy Awards	Best TV Writing in a Special or Episode	Won
2003	This Hour Has 22 Minutes with Greg Thomey, Mary Walsh, Cathy Jones, Mark Critch, Mark Farrell, Paul Mather, Peter McBain, Luciano Casimiri, Kevin White	Canadian Comedy Awards	Best TV Writing in a Special or Episode	Nominated
2003	This Hour Has 22 Minutes	Gemini Awards	Best Ensemble Performance in a Comedy Program or Series	Won
2004	Colin Mochrie – Expecting	Canadian Comedy Awards	Best Male Performance – Film	Nominated
2004	Colin Mochrie – Expecting with Karl Pruner, Barbara Radecki, Cindy Stone	Canadian Comedy Awards	Best Writing – Film	Nominated
2005	Getting Along Famously	Canadian Comedy Awards	Best Writing for a Special or Episode	Nominated
2005	Getting Along Famously	Gemini Awards	Best Writing in a Comedy or Variety Program or Series	Nominated
2008	History Bites for episode Celine Dion	Gemini Awards	Best Writing in a Comedy or Variety Program or Series	Nominated
2010	Colin Mochrie	ACTRA Toronto Awards	Award of Excellence	Won
2010	Colin Mochrie	Canadian Comedy Awards	Canadian Comedy Person of the Year	Nominated
2012	Colin Mochrie	Canadian Comedy Awards	Phil Hartman Award	Nominated
2012	Colin Mochrie	Canadian Comedy Awards	Dave Broadfoot Award	Won
2013	Colin Mochrie	Canadian Comedy Awards	Canadian Comedy Person of the Year	Won
2015	Colin Mochrie	ACTRA Toronto Awards	Outstanding Performance – Male	Nominated
2016	Colin Mochrie & Wayne Jones	Canadian Comedy Awards	Best Live Production	Nominated
