= Jane White Is Sick & Twisted =

2002 American comedy film

- Directed by: David Michael Latt
- Produced by: David Michael Latt; Kim Little
- Starring: Kim Little; Wil Wheaton; Alley Mills; Richard Kline
- Distributed by: The Asylum
- Release date: January 27, 2002
- Running time: 90 minutes
- Country: United States
- Language: English

Jane White Is Sick & Twisted is a 2002 American comedy film written and directed by David Michael Latt, produced by The Asylum, and starring Kim Little. It is one of few films by the studio not to be made to capitalize on another film, and is also one of few Asylum films to have a theatrical release.

== Plot ==
The film follows Jane White (Kim Little), a teenager who is obsessed with television, and dreams of becoming a TV celebrity. She is insistent that her Father is a famous talk show host, and goes to lengths in order to appear as a guest on his show. This includes dressing as a transgender prostitute, where she meets Barney (Colin Mochrie), who aids her in getting a bus ticket to Chicago. She is scolded by her mother (Alley Mills) who berates her love of television and her father. Once she arrives at the bus station, she meets Dick Smith (Wil Wheaton); they fall in love swiftly and become a couple. She embarks on a chaotic road trip with her eccentric boyfriend, determined to confront Gerry live and try to launch herself into reality television fame.

== Cast ==
- Kim Little as Jane White
- Wil Wheaton as Dick Smith
- Alley Mills as Mom
- Richard Kline as Anchor Chris Jobin
- Dustin Diamond as Simone
- Ted Shackelford as Eddie
- Chris Hardwick as Burger
- Phil LaMarr as Bert
- Colin Mochrie as Barney
- Michelle Phillips as June
- Gary Owens as TV announcer
- David L. Lander as Gerry King
- Andrew Lauer as Desiree
- Eric Lutes as Candy
- Mickey Jones as Kenny Kingman
- Maureen McCormick as Nancy
- Danica McKellar as Tiffany
- Brad Sherwood as homeless man
- Debra Wilson as Chi-Chi

== Awards and nominations ==
Colin Mochrie won a B-Movie Award for Best B-Movie Hollywood Appearance or Cameo.
