= SAK Comedy Lab =

SAK Comedy Lab (SAK) is a 250-seat Improvisational Comedy (Improv) theater in downtown Orlando, Florida. SAK's most notable alumnus is actor Wayne Brady, who has played as a guest player in several SAK shows since finding fame as a performer on Whose Line Is It Anyway?, Let's Make a Deal, Chappelle's Show, and other projects. SAK's regular performers are referred to as the SAK Ensemble.

SAK runs an improv training school, SAK University (SAK U), which features four levels of core classes and two advanced Conservatory classes

== Shows ==
SAK's main show is the Duel of Fools. This show features two teams of three improvisers, one host/ referee, and a piano player to add music. SAK will often feature a different ten p.m. show that offers a format other than the standard Duel of Fools.

While Duel of Fools runs continuously, the club also rotates other temporary shows through its repertoire. These have included the 2007 Rub a Dub Dub, a show in which players dub their lines over health films and silent movies. The Lost Comedies of William Shakespeare, directed by David Charles in 2006, was a parody of Shakespeare's work, in which the performers synthesized a five-act play from audience suggestions. The show received positive reviews from the Orlando Sentinel. The players created a Broadway-style musical in Fourplay: The Improvised Musical, which ran during the summer of 2006. Also in 2006 were You Bet Your Asterisk, an improv game show, and SAK Request Live.

Seasonal shows at SAK include variations on Duel of Fools, such as Love for Fools (Valentine's Day), Yule of Fools (Christmas), Midnight Halloween Torture Show, and Mardi Gras SAK Style.

Other continuous programs include Lab Rats, a show for invited graduates of SAK's improv training school, and Generation S (Gen S), a showcase of the best of Lab Rats and special invitees who are being trained to join the ensemble. The most recent showcase of SAK is "The Thursday Show" which takes classic improv formats but draws the cast from talent in their development program, consisting of top students from "SAK University". Together with a couple of invited professional performers, this new crew will create comedy on the spot based on audience suggestions.

== Company History ==
SAK Theatre began in Buffalo, Minnesota when a troupe of four individuals with a background in evangelical street theater began performing at the Minnesota Renaissance Festival in 1977. After a few years, opportunities arose for SAK to perform at multiple festivals simultaneously. The original troupe trained additional performers, and SAK grew from four members to twelve.

In 1982, while performing at a festival in Largo, Florida, entertainment scouts from the Walt Disney Company came looking for entertainment acts to populate the World Showcase at the newly opening Epcot Center. SAK Theatre Company was now an official corporation and moved its base of operations to Florida.

For seven years, SAK produced, performed, and managed live audience participatory comedy shows for Walt Disney World in the United Kingdom Pavilion at Epcot and Italy Pavilion at Epcot, as well as other shows performed in and around the parks. SAK also continued to appear at festivals, expos, and fairs worldwide well into the 1990s, employing over 30 full-time performers, production, and office staff.

In 1991 after the Disney contract ended, SAK Theatre Company opened the SAK Comedy Lab on Church Street in downtown Orlando. This first venue was a 99-seat theater dedicated to performing original comedy plays (many developed through improvisation) and improv shows. At this time, the SAK improv comedy competition, the “Duel of Fools," had started. Every Friday and Saturday night for the past 23 years, two teams of improvisers have battled against each other to see who could make up the funniest scenes, sketches, and songs based on audience suggestions.

It currently serves over 30,000 patrons a year, as well as Central Florida organizations such as the Orlando Magic, Florida Hospital, and Darden Restaurants with its team training and corporate comedy shows.

== Location ==
The original SAK Theater was located on Church Street in downtown Orlando. The company quickly outgrew the space and moved to its second location at 380 W. Amelia Ave, which led to parking difficulties during events at the Amway Arena. In early 2010, SAK moved to 29 S. Orange Ave. in Downtown Orlando. SAK opened its current location in 2024, once again located on Orlando's historic Church Street Station area, in the 55 West complex of downtown Orlando.

== Notable SAK Alumni ==
Many of SAK's former ensemble members moved on to careers in acting, film, and other performance roles. These include:

- Dee Bradley Baker
- Wayne Brady
- Karey Kirkpatrick
- Jonathan Mangum
- Paula Pell
- Moira Quirk
- Aaron Shure
- Paul C. Vogt
