= Drew Carey's Green Screen Show =

American television series (2004–2005)

- Genre: Improvisational comedy
- Created by: Drew Carey
- Directed by: Marv Newland; Sharon Trojan Hollinger; Bob Spang; Brumby Boyleston; John R. Dilworth; Cordell Barker; Eli Noyes; Janet Perlman
- Presented by: Drew Carey
- Starring: Drew Carey; Brad Sherwood; Colin Mochrie; Jeff Davis; Greg Proops; Chip Esten; Jonathan Mangum; Sean Masterson; Kathy Kinney; Julie Larson
- Theme music composer: Tonino Carotone, Manu Chao
- Opening theme: "La Trampa"
- Composer: Michael A. Levine
- Country of origin: United States
- No. of seasons: 2
- No. of episodes: 13 (1 unaired)

Production
- Executive producers: Ron Diamond; Robert Morton; Drew Carey
- Producers: Steiner Kierce; Brad Sherwood
- Editors: Rick W. Finney; George Khair; Jeff Malmberg
- Production companies: International Mammoth Television; Acme Film Works; Michigan J. Frog Productions (2004); Comedy Central Productions (2005)

Original release
- Network: The WB
- Release: October 7 – November 4, 2004
- Network: Comedy Central
- Release: September 26 – November 8, 2005

Related
- Whose Line Is It Anyway? Improv-A-Ganza

Drew Carey's Green Screen Show is an American improvisational comedy television series that aired from October 7 to November 4, 2004 on The WB, and from September 26 to November 8, 2005 on Comedy Central. The show was hosted by Drew Carey, and was somewhat a follow-up to the show he formerly hosted, Whose Line Is It Anyway?. The distinguishing feature of the show was that the improv games were performed in front of a "green screen" (similar to the "Newsflash" game from Whose Line?), with animation, music and sound effects inserted in post-production. The show was otherwise very similar to Whose Line? and featured many of the same performers and games.

On an appearance on Late Night with Conan O'Brien when "Green Screen" premiered, Carey claimed that he got the idea during the Whose Line? game "Moving People" when he thought how funny it would be if you could not see the people manipulating the players.

The show's theme song was La Trampa, performed by Tonino Carotone and Manu Chao and the show's underscore was composed by Michael A. Levine.

== Performers ==
Besides Drew Carey, the performers and the corresponding number of episodes they appeared in were:

=== Regular ===
- Brad Sherwood – 12 episodes
- Colin Mochrie – 12 episodes
- Jeff Davis – 12 episodes
- Greg Proops – 12 episodes

=== Recurring ===
- Chip Esten – 8 episodes
- Jonathan Mangum – 7 episodes
- Sean Masterson – 7 episodes
- Kathy Kinney – 6 episodes
- Julie Larson – 6 episodes

Ryan Stiles and Kaitlin Olson both performed in the pilot episode, which was never aired.

== Format ==
Each episode featured seven or eight performers, including Carey. Performers appearing during the series were Drew Carey, Brad Sherwood, Colin Mochrie, Jeff Davis, Greg Proops as regulars, and Chip Esten, Julie Larson, Sean Masterson, Jonathan Mangum, and Kathy Kinney; in addition, both Ryan Stiles and Kaitlin Olson appeared at the pilot taping, although not in any episodes. Because of the number of cast members and the smaller number of games (which had to produce scenes that made use of the animation), many cast members only got small amounts of screen time and less time for rapport on screen.

Each episode began with Carey walking onstage and demonstrating how the green screen stage could be used to add animation to his actions in post-production. The show then went right into games. Sometimes scenes were set with a simple premise and no twist. Other scenes were improvisation games, similar to those on Whose Line?; these included longer scenes, and more rapid-fire games which involved various short scenes.

Unlike Whose Line?, segments of the show came from multiple tapings, as evident by the cast wearing different outfits after each commercial break, removing the pretext of the former show that filming was continuous. The show was also more conspicuous in its edits during games. The show would usually have 4-5 games in episode, with an occasional clip beginning in the middle of a scene with no explanation.

The show featured various animation styles for the green screen including hand-drawn animation, CGI, stop-motion and even puppeteering. Among the more well known animators included Eric Goldberg, Bill Plympton and Rob Schrab. Many of the stop-motion animators would go on to work on the show Robot Chicken.

== Games ==
- Sentences: Players pulled slips of paper with sentences written on them from a toy bucket and took them out to use them in the scene being acted out. Similar to Whose Line on Whose Line is it Anyway?.
- Fill in the Blank: Drew gave the audience a scene title with blanks in it for them to fill in. Players then acted out the scene.
- Story: Players took turns telling parts of an audience-suggested story as another pointed to them.
- One-Syllable Words: Players acted out a scene and had to use only words with one syllable. Multiple-syllable words got players buzzed out by the audience and replaced by another.
- New Choice: Players acted out a scene and when another said "New choice", they had to change what they said or did. Similar to Quick Change on Whose Line is it Anyway?.
- Sound Effects: Two audience members provided sound effects for a scene acted out by two players.
- Freeze Tag: Players acted out a scene in audience-suggested non-sexual positions. Another player would say "Freeze", tag one out and assume the position of that player.
- Game Show: Players acted out a game show with a title suggested by the audience.
- Hollywood Moment: Players acted out a scene and when another said "Hollywood Moment" off-camera, the on-camera players acted out a big-time Hollywood movie-type moment.
- Montage: Players acted out a series of scenes connected by a theme.
- Moving People: Two audience members in all-green clothing (provided to them prior to the show) moved two players as they performed a scene.
- Styles: audience members suggested scene styles and when Drew called one out, the players continued their scene in that style. Similar to the Whose Line is it Anyway? game Film and Theatre Styles/Film, Theatre and Television Styles.

== History ==
Drew Carey's Green Screen Show premiered on The WB Network on October 7, 2004. Coinciding with the show's debut, Carey participated in a number of promotional appearances, such as guest hosting The Late Late Show, and starring in a special episode of Blue Collar TV, Green Screen's lead-in program. On November 8, after having run five episodes, The WB announced that it was temporarily pulling Drew Carey's Green Screen Show from its schedule for November sweeps after it averaged 2.7 million viewers per week.

It was confirmed as cancelled in May 2005 at their 2005-06 fall presentation. As a result, Carey and executive producer Ron Diamond took the show to Comedy Central, returning it to the air on September 26, 2005.

== Episodes ==
=== Season 1 (The WB) ===
No.	Recurring Performers	Games Performed	Original air date
1	Chip Esten, Julie Larson	Freeze Tag, Sentences, New Choice, One Syllable Word	October 7, 2004
2	Jonathan Mangum, Sean Masterson	One Syllable Word, Sentences, New Choice, Freeze Tag	October 14, 2004
3	Chip Esten, Julie Larson	Game Show, Sound Effects, New Choice, Freeze Tag	October 21, 2004
4	Chip Esten, Julie Larson, Sean Masterson	One Syllable Word, Hollywood Moments, Sound Effects, Story	October 28, 2004
5	Chip Esten, Kathy Kinney, Jonathan Mangum	One Syllable Word, New Choice, Story, Sound Effects	November 4, 2004

=== Season 2 (Comedy Central) ===
No.	Recurring Performers	Games Performed	Original air date
6	Chip Esten, Kathy Kinney, Jonathan Mangum, Sean Masterson	Styles, Game Show, Freeze Tag, Story	September 26, 2005
7	Jonathan Mangum, Sean Masterson	New Choice, Sound Effects, Hollywood Moments, Styles	October 3, 2005
8	Kathy Kinney, Jonathan Mangum	Game Show, Sound Effects, New Choice, Moving People	October 10, 2005
9	Kathy Kinney, Julie Larson, Jonathan Mangum, Sean Masterson	Sound Effects, Montage, New Choice, Scene	October 17, 2005
10	Chip Esten, Julie Larson, Sean Masterson	Freeze Tag, Game Show, Montage, Scene	October 24, 2005
11	Chip Esten, Kathy Kinney	Sound Effects, New Choice, Sentences, Story	November 1, 2005
12	Chip Esten, Kathy Kinney, Julie Larson, Jonathan Mangum, Sean Masterson	Montage, Story, Scene, Sentences, Montage	November 8, 2005
13	Ryan Stiles, Kaitlin Olson, Jonathan Mangum	Freeze Tag, Hollywood Moments, Scene, Story	Unaired
