= The Dating Game =

American television game show

- Also known as: The New Dating Game; The All-New Dating Game; The Celebrity Dating Game
- Genre: Dating game show
- Created by: Chuck Barris
- Directed by: John Dorsey; Linda Howard; Clay Jacobsen; Paul Casey; Ken Fuchs
- Presented by: Jim Lange; Elaine Joyce; Jeff MacGregor; Brad Sherwood; Chuck Woolery; Zooey Deschanel; Michael Bolton
- Announcer: Johnny Jacobs; Bob Hilton; Charlie O'Donnell; Virginia Watson; JJ Surma
- Country of origin: United States
- Original language: English
- No. of seasons: 8 (1965–1973); 1 (1973–1974); 2 (1978–1980); 3 (1986–1989); 3 (1996–1999); 1 (2021)
- No. of episodes: 8 (ABC; 2021)

Production
- Executive producers: Chuck Barris (1965–1974; 1978–1980; 1986–1987); David M. Greenfield (1977–1980); Jeff Wald (1987–1988); Scott Sternberg (1988–1989); Michael Canter (1996–1999); Charles Wachter (2021); Michael Bolton (2021); Christina Kline (2021); Wendi Wan (2021)
- Running time: 30 minutes with commercials (1965–1999); 42 minutes (2021)
- Production companies: Barris Industries (1965–1974; 1978–1980; 1986–1989); Columbia TriStar Television (1996–1999); Hard North Media (2021); Passion Films (2021); Sony Pictures Television (2021)

Original release
- Network: ABC Daytime
- Release: December 20, 1965 – July 6, 1973
- Network: ABC Primetime
- Release: October 6, 1966 – January 17, 1970
- Network: Syndication
- Release: September 10, 1973 – June 3, 1974
- Release: September 4, 1978 – May 23, 1980
- Release: September 15, 1986 – September 8, 1989
- Release: September 9, 1996 – September 1999
- Network: ABC
- Release: June 14 – August 16, 2021

The Dating Game is an American television game show that first aired on December 20, 1965, and was the first of many shows created and packaged by Chuck Barris from the 1960s through the 1980s. ABC dropped the show on July 6, 1973, but it continued in syndication for another year (1973–1974) as The New Dating Game. The program was revived four additional times afterward, with the first from 1978 to 1980 as The All-New Dating Game, the second from 1986 to 1989, and the third from 1996 to 1999 all airing in syndication, while the fourth revival aired a single season on ABC in 2021. The show featured a bachelorette asking questions of three bachelors hidden from her view, to determine which of the three she would date.

Jim Lange hosted The Dating Game for its entire ABC network run and for the 1973 and 1978 syndicated editions. The 1986 revival was hosted by Elaine Joyce for its first season and Jeff MacGregor for its remaining two seasons. When the show was revived with a different format in 1996, Brad Sherwood was named as its host. Chuck Woolery took over for the two final seasons, with the original format reinstated, in 1997 after he had left The Home and Family Show.

Beginning in 1966, The Dating Game was often paired with The Newlywed Game. This was especially true when the two shows entered syndication, and in 1996, the revivals of The Dating Game and The Newlywed Game were sold together as a package called The Dating/Newlywed Hour.

The program was originally broadcast in black-and-white, but when a prime-time version began in October 1966, both versions were broadcast in color, making the daytime version the first ABC daytime series to be regularly broadcast in color.

In February 2021, it was reported that ABC and current distributor Sony Pictures Television would revive the show as The Celebrity Dating Game, with actress Zooey Deschanel and singer Michael Bolton as hosts, which premiered on June 14, 2021. It ran for eight episodes until August 16, 2021, and was canceled in April 2022.

== Format ==
Typically, a bachelorette would question three bachelors, who were hidden from her view; at the end of the questioning period, she would choose one to accompany her on a date, with expenses paid by the show. Occasionally, the roles would be reversed with a gentleman questioning three ladies; other times, celebrities would question three players for dates for themselves, co-workers or relatives.

Before becoming famous, Farrah Fawcett, Suzanne Somers, Yvonne Craig, Lindsay Wagner, Leif Garrett, Tom Selleck and Lee Majors appeared as contestants on the show in the 1960s and early 1970s. Other contestants who appeared before becoming famous included the Carpenters, Jackson Bostwick, Michael Richards, Joanna Cameron, Andy Kaufman in his Foreign Man persona (under the pseudonym Baji Kimran), Steve Martin, Burt Reynolds, John Ritter, Phil Hartman, Jennifer Granholm, Arnold Schwarzenegger, and Alex Kozinski. Serial killer Rodney Alcala's episodes were shown during his murder spree and after he had been convicted of assault in California.

Some contestants appeared even after they were fairly well known, including Michael Jackson, Burton Cummings, Dusty Springfield, Ron Howard, Maureen McCormick, Barry Williams, Sally Field, Richard Dawson, Jay North, Ted Bessell, Angela Cartwright, Robert Vaughn and Paul Lynde.

A trademark of the show was that at the end of each episode, the host and winning contestants would blow a kiss to the viewers.

== Gameplay ==
=== Original version ===
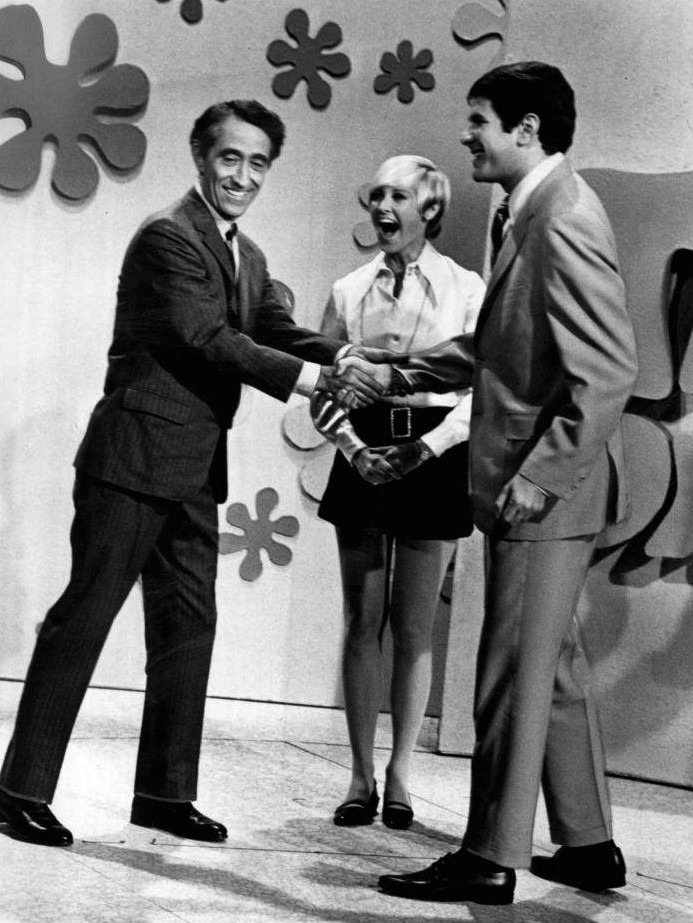
Comedian Pat Paulsen makes a guest appearance in 1968.

Generally, the bachelorette would ask questions, written in advance on cards, to each of the three hidden bachelors. The same question could be asked to multiple bachelors. This continued until time ran out. The bachelorette would make her choice based solely on the answers to her questions. Occasionally, the contestant was a bachelor who would ask questions to three bachelorettes. Certain kinds of questions were "off limits", such as name, age, occupation and income.

=== 1996 revival ===
For the first season of the 1996 revival, a different format was used. A notable change was that the prospective bachelor/bachelorette knew the first names of the three contestants.

Instead of asking questions of the contestants, the bachelor/bachelorette was presented with two pun-laden statements, each pertaining to one of the contestants. When chosen, a new statement replaced the old one and the potential date explained the reason why that fact pertained to him or her. Play continued until time expired, and then the bachelor/bachelorette would announce his or her choice.

In several weeks of episodes that aired at various times throughout the season, another format was used. This format had the players choose a potential date based on appearance and another based on personality. To decide the "looks" portion, the bachelor/bachelorette would observe each contestant (another change not seen on any Dating Game series beforehand) for several seconds, with the contestants wearing noise-canceling headphones to prevent them from hearing the bachelor/bachelorette talking about them. The statement round was used to determine the "personality" portion. After the game ended, the bachelor/bachelorette would select one contestant based on appearance and one based on personality, then would be prompted to choose between the two. If the bachelor/bachelorette was to select the same contestant for both looks and personality, the contestant would win a $500 cash prize.

The remaining two seasons reverted to the original format, but there was more of a variety between bachelors and bachelorettes.

== Episode status ==
Various episodes from the ABC daytime run have aired on Game Show Network. The remaining ABC versions of the show, which were made for primetime and for syndication, are assumed to exist in their entirety.

After the syndicated finale in 1980, repeats of the 1978–1980 version were seen on KHJ-TV (now KCAL-TV) in Los Angeles from September 26, 1983, to September 12, 1986 (when The All-New Dating Game with Elaine Joyce premiered on September 15, 1986), as well as in some other cities. In another variation of the final year in reruns, some episodes from ABC daytime, ABC primetime and weekly syndication were shown.

== Guests ==
Notable people who appeared on The Dating Game include:

- Rodney Alcala, subsequently dubbed "The Dating Game Killer" (1978)
- Jo Anne Worley (1967)
- Steve Martin (1968)
- John Ritter
- Farrah Fawcett
- Michael Jackson
- Suzanne Somers
- Tom Selleck
- Pee-Wee Herman
- Phil Hartman
- Robin and Maurice Gibb from the Bee Gees
- Angela Cartwright

== Theme music and cues ==
The show used many contemporary songs, ranging from those of Herb Alpert and the Tijuana Brass from the 1960s to pop music used for celebrity guest and band appearances. For the first few episodes at the beginning of the ABC run, live music was provided by the Regents (unrelated to the doo-wop band of the same name who were famous for their song "Barbara Ann"), a house band from Jack Martin's A.M-P.M. on La Cienega Boulevard Starting in 1966, the show used recorded music, with the main theme provided by the Mariachi Brass, featuring trumpeter Chet Baker. The show used cover songs made by Skip Battin & the Group (1967, Aurora 159) and the Challengers (196?, Triumph 64).

The series used several songs by Herb Alpert and the Tijuana Brass as cues for the show, including:

- "Spanish Flea" (when introducing the bachelor)
- "Whipped Cream" (when introducing the bachelorette)
- "Lollipops and Roses" (when the dates meet)

Other songs were used after the interview portion, when guests were choosing a date, including:

- "Ladyfingers" (Herb Alpert)
- "Lemon Tree" (Herb Alpert)

Music used during celebrity guest appearances included:

- "Live" (The Merry-Go-Round)
- "Close to You" (Carpenters)
- "Midnight Confessions" (The Grass Roots)
- "I Want To Be Where You Are" (Michael Jackson)
- "I Want You Back" (The Jackson Five), during the prize description
- "Cheyenne" (The Brady Bunch)
- "Goin' Out of My Head" (Little Anthony)
- "What's It Gonna Be" (Dusty Springfield)

Other music cues used on the show included:

- "Fantail" by Count Basie (when host Jim Lange would introduce the three potential dates to the audience)
- "Love Sickness" by the Trumpets Ole (a brief cue used when the time limit for the interview portion is reached)
- "Boston Bust-Out" by Jimmy McGriff (before the date is introduced to his or her prize)

In 1972, The Dating Game added a Dixieland-style closing theme called "Little Rosie" to its ABC daytime version; the tune was used also on the first two syndicated versions, through 1980. The song, along with some of the show's other cues, was featured on the 1973 album Themes from TV Game Shows, produced by Chuck Barris. The show continued to use the 1966 opening theme until 1974; during the 1978-80 version, the show used a rearranged version of it. The 1978 opening theme is found on the Barris album's first track and is credited to Barris and David Mook.

The 1980s reboot of the show used music composed by Milton DeLugg, while later editions featured a re-recording of the original theme by Steve Kaplan.

The music for The Celebrity Dating Game was composed by Cheche Alara.

== International versions ==
These versions are no longer airing.

Country	Local name	Host	Network	Aired
Australia	Blind Date	Graham Webb (1967–1969); Jeremy Cordeaux (1970); Bobby Hanna (1974); Greg Evans (1991); Julia Morris (2018)	Network Ten (1967–1970; 1991; 2018); Seven Network (1974)	1967–1970; 1974; 1991; 2018
Australia	Perfect Match	Greg Evans (1984–1986; 1988–1989); Cameron Daddo (1987–1988); Shelley Craft (2002)	Network Ten; Seven Network	1984–1989; 2002
Austria	Herzblatt	Rudi Carrell (1987–1993); Rainhard Fendrich (1993–1997); Hera Lind (1997–1998); Christian Clerici (1998–1999); Pierre Geisensetter (1999–2001); Jörg Pilawa (2001–2004); Alexander Mazza (2005)	ORF	1987–2005
Belgium	Blind Date	Ingeborg Sergeant; Elke Vanelderen; Nathalie Meskens	VTM	1995–2005
Brazil	Namoro na TV	Silvio Santos	Tupi; SBT	1976; 1988
Bulgaria	Любовни игри Lyubovni igri	Lina Zlateva	bTV	2009
Colombia	Adán y Eva	Jota Mario Valencia	Cadena Uno (1987–1989; 1993–1994); Cadena Dos (1989–1991)	1987–1994
Croatia	Srcolovka	Boris Mirković	RTL Televizija	2004–2005
Czech Republic	?	?	Prima	?
Denmark	Knald eller fald	Peter Hansen; Birthe Kjær	TV3	1993–1997
Estonia	Reisile Sinuga	Vahur Kersna	Kanal 2 ETV	2014–2015
Finland	Napakymppi	Markus Similä (1985); Kari Salmelainen (1985–2002); Joanna Kantola (2001–2002); Janne Kataja (2017–2019)	MTV (1985–1992); MTV3 (1993–2002); Nelonen (2017–2019)	1985–2002; 2017–2019
France	Tournez Manège !	Évelyne Leclercq; Simone Garnier; Fabienne Égal	TF1	1985–1993
France	Tournez Manège !	Sébastien Cauet	TF1	2009–2010
Germany	Herzblatt	Rudi Carrell (1987–1993); Rainhard Fendrich (1993–1997); Hera Lind (1997–1998); Christian Clerici (1998–1999); Pierre Geisensetter (1999–2001); Jörg Pilawa (2001–2004); Alexander Mazza (2005)	Das Erste	1987–2005
Germany	Herz ist Trumpf	Stephan Lehmann	Sat.1	1992–1993
Germany	Herz sucht Liebe	Thomas Ohrner	Sat.1 Gold	2016
Greece	Ραντεβού στα φανερά Rantevoú sta fanerá	Stefanos Papadopoulos	ANT1	2005
Hungary	?	?	RTL Klub	?
Ireland	Blind Date	Al Porter	TV3	2017
Israel	משחק מקדים; Mischak Makdim	Galit Gutman	Channel 10	2004–2005
Italy	Il gioco delle coppie Il gioco delle coppie Estate	Marco Predolin (1985–1990); Corrado Tedeschi (1990–1992)	Italia 1 (1985–1986); Rete 4 (1986–1988; 1991–1992); Canale 5 (1988–1991)	1985–1992
Italy	Il nuovo gioco delle coppie Il nuovo gioco delle coppie - Estate	Giorgio Mastrota and Natalia Estrada	Rete 4	1993
Italy	Il gioco delle coppie Beach	Trettré and Wendy Windham	Rete 4	1994
Latvia	?	?	LTV	?
Mexico	Las Andanzas de Cupido	?	TV Azteca	?
New Zealand	Blind Date	Dave Jamieson; Suzy Clarkson	TVNZ	1989–1990
Poland	Randka w ciemno	Jacek Kawalec (1992–1998); Tomasz Kammel (1998–2005)	TVP1	1992–2005
Serbia and Montenegro	Srodne duše	Ana Mihajlovski; Marijana Micic; Marina Trifunovic; Inspektor Blaza	RTS; Pink M	2005–2006
Slovenia	Zmenkarije	Srečko Meh; Karin Komljanec; Katarina Čas	Kanal A	1998–2001
Spain	Vivan los novios	Andoni Ferreño (1991–1993); Gabriel Corrado (1993–1994)	Telecinco	1991–1994
Sweden	Tur i kärlek	Adam Alsing (1991); Agneta Sjödin (1991); Renée Nyberg (1992–1993)	TV4	1991–1993
Turkey	Saklambaç	Nurseli İdiz	Show TV	1992–1996
United Kingdom	Blind Date	Cilla Black; Paul O'Grady; Maura Higgins	ITV; Channel 5 Disney+	1985–2003; 2017–2019; 2027
United States	The Dating Game; The New Dating Game	Jim Lange	ABC; Syndication	1965–1973; 1973–1974; 1978–1980
United States	The All-New Dating Game	Elaine Joyce; Jeff MacGregor	Syndication	1986–1987; 1987–1989
United States	The Dating Game	Brad Sherwood; Chuck Woolery	Syndication	1996–1997; 1997–1999
United States	The Celebrity Dating Game	Zooey Deschanel; Michael Bolton	ABC	2021

== Legacy ==
In his first autobiography, Confessions of a Dangerous Mind (1988), Chuck Barris claimed that The Dating Game was a cover for his CIA activities, and was promoted by the CIA. However, his second memoir, The Game Show King: A Confession (1993), mentions neither the CIA nor his previous book. A CIA spokesman has categorically denied that Barris ever worked for the agency in any capacity.

The show's popularity in the 1960s inspired a Baskin-Robbins ice cream flavor called Dating Game. It was pink ice cream with diced dates and butter-toasted pecans.

In a 1980 Laverne and Shirley episode, Lenny and Squiggy appear as bachelors on The Dating Game.

The Dating Game was parodied by Steve Jobs during a 1983 Macintosh pre-launch event. The three "contestants" were Mitch Kapor of Lotus Development, Fred Gibbons of Software Publishing Corporation and Bill Gates of Microsoft.

A recurring parody featured in the current version of Let's Make a Deal called The Dealing Game features Wayne Brady and Jonathan Mangum (both as different characters in each appearance), but instead of a date, each represents a curtain and tries to convince the contestant to pick his curtain. Model Tiffany Coyne plays the role of the "hostess".

The Dating Game has been cited as a predecessor to future "reality TV juggernaut" Love is Blind in which contestants similarly choose among suitors sight unseen.

== Licensed merchandise ==
Hasbro released three home games based on the original 1965 version of The Dating Game from 1967 to 1968, while Pressman Toy Corporation released a home game based on the late 1980s version in 1987.

In 1968, a 33⅓ rpm party record called The Dating Game Party Pak, narrated by Jim Lange, was released; it included postcard invitations, name tags and scorecards for six people to play.

In the late 1990s, Sony's website released an online version of The Dating Game.

A video slot machine based on the original 1965 version with an animated Jim Lange was released by IGT in 2004 in both nickel and quarter versions.

In March 2011, a new virtual version of The Dating Game was launched on Facebook, Twitter and other social media network sites. The game was developed by 3G Studios, under license from Sony Pictures Entertainment.

== See also ==
- Blind Date
- Perfect Match
