= Sean Masterson =

American actor, comedian, screenwriter, producer (born 20th century)

- Born: 20th century New York City, New York, U.S.
- Occupations: Actor, comedian, writer, producer
- Years active: 1984–present

Sean Masterson (born 20th century) is an American comedy actor, writer, director and producer.

He is known for his work with Drew Carey, writing on The Drew Carey Show, and as an improvisational performer on Whose Line Is It Anyway?, Drew Carey's Green Screen Show, and Drew Carey's Improv-A-Ganza.

== Early life, education and child career ==
Masterson was raised in Los Angeles and began his career at the age of six when he appeared in a Count Chocula / Franken Berry television commercial, directed by Bill Melendez.

After graduating high school in Los Angeles and acting in commercials, daytime serials, and school plays, Masterson briefly attended college. He later moved to Chicago to begin pursuing an acting career.

== Adult career ==
After bartending and working odd jobs for nine months, he was hired by The Second City, the improvisational-comedy troupe, where he worked on stage with Mike Myers, Steve Carell and Bonnie Hunt. Masterson started working with Ryan Stiles and Carey upon returning to Los Angeles, performing live improvisational comedy as a part of "The Improv All Stars".

Masterson created and co-wrote the web show Home Purchasing Club for VH1/Spike, which ran for two seasons and featured Kristen Wiig, Jeff Garlin, Diedrich Bader, and David Koechner. Home Purchasing Club was directed by Brian K. Roberts and executive produced by Jordan Levin, Pete Aronson and Generate.

Masterson created, wrote and directed Republicrats for the MSN (Microsoft) website, portraying a former Fresno, California, television weatherman who decides to run for President of the United States against John McCain and Barack Obama. Republicrats was reviewed by The Wall Street Journal, The Hollywood Reporter and TV Week as a Top Web Show of 2008. Republicrats was produced by Ivana Ma and Generate.

In 2008, Masterson was named a top-ten web video producers to watch by TV Week.

Masterson and Ryan Stiles wrote a half-hour comedy pilot called Memory Lanes, directed by Brian K. Roberts and produced by Masterson, Stiles, and Richard Elwood.

=== Filmography ===
Masterson is known for his appearances in the improvisational shows Drew Carey's Green Screen Show, and Drew Carey's Improv-A-Ganza. He has appeared in numerous television series apart from the two Whose Line Is It Anyway? spin-offs.

Title	Role	Year	Notes
Fatal Games	Phil Dandridge	1984	Film
21 Jump Street	Caller (voice)	1989	TV series
Saved by the Bell	Lt. Thompson	1990	TV series
Herman's Head	Maitre'd	1991	TV series
Sibs	?	1992	TV series
Melrose Place	Yuppie Man	1992	TV series
Murphy Brown	Reporter #4	1993	TV series
Dream On	Carter	1990–1995	TV series (9 episodes)
Friends	'Monkeyshine' Guy	1996	TV series
Couch	Sean	1996	TV series
Tracey Takes On...	Glen	1997	TV series
Courting Courtney	Al Kennedy	1997	Film
Wag the Dog	Bob Richardson	1997	Film
Caroline in the City	Todd	1998	TV series
3rd Rock from the Sun	Justin	1999	TV series
Love Boat: The Next Wave	Teddy	1999	TV series
Late Last Night	BMW Man	1999	TV movie
Strip Mall	Host	2000	TV series
The Drew Carey Show	Bob	2000	TV series
Grounded for Life	Tom	2004	TV series
Drew Carey's Green Screen Show	Himself	2004–2005	TV series (7 episodes)
It Can Always Get Worse	Donny	2005	Short
The ½ Hour News Hour	Robert McGee	2005	TV series (4 episodes)
Home Purchasing Club	Steve	2007	TV series
Republicrats	Himself	2008	TV series
Memory Lanes	Sean Murrary	2009	TV movie
Punching the Clown	Kurt	2009	TV movie
Toybox	Rici	2010–2011	TV series (2 episodes)
Drew Carey's Improv-A-Ganza	Himself	2011	TV series (3 episodes)

== Video games ==
Title	Role	Year
Lands of Lore: Guardians of Destiny	Luthor (voice)	1997
Lands of Lore III	Luthor/Frank/Mark LeGre (voice)	1999

== Personal life ==
Masterson has a wife and two children and he lives in Los Angeles, California.
