= Drew Carey's Improv-A-Ganza =

American comedy television series (2011)

- Created by: Drew Carey
- Directed by: Liz Zanin
- Presented by: Drew Carey
- Starring: Drew Carey; Ryan Stiles; Colin Mochrie; Jeff Davis; Chip Esten; Jonathan Mangum; Greg Proops; Kathy Kinney; Brad Sherwood; Heather Anne Campbell; Sean Masterson; Bob Derkach; Wayne Brady
- Narrated by: Rich Fields
- Music by: Bob Derkach
- Country of origin: United States
- No. of seasons: 1
- No. of episodes: 40 (list of episodes)

Production
- Executive producers: Joe Roth; Drew Carey; Scott Hemming; Vince Totino
- Producers: Ryan Stiles; Mike Sarkissian
- Production location: MGM Grand Las Vegas
- Running time: 20–24 minutes
- Production companies: Three Foot Giant Productions; Revolution Television; International Mammoth Television

Original release
- Network: GSN
- Release: April 11 – June 3, 2011

Related
- Whose Line Is It Anyway? Green Screen Show

Drew Carey's Improv-A-Ganza is an American improvisational comedy television program that aired in the United States on GSN. Produced at the Hollywood Theatre at the MGM Grand in Paradise, Nevada, the series was hosted by Drew Carey, host of the original American version of Whose Line Is It Anyway?, a similar show that featured several of the same cast members. The show premiered on April 11, 2011, airing 40 episodes in total. The series completed its eight-week run on June 3, 2011. Despite only lasting for one season, critical reception of the show was generally positive.

== Format ==
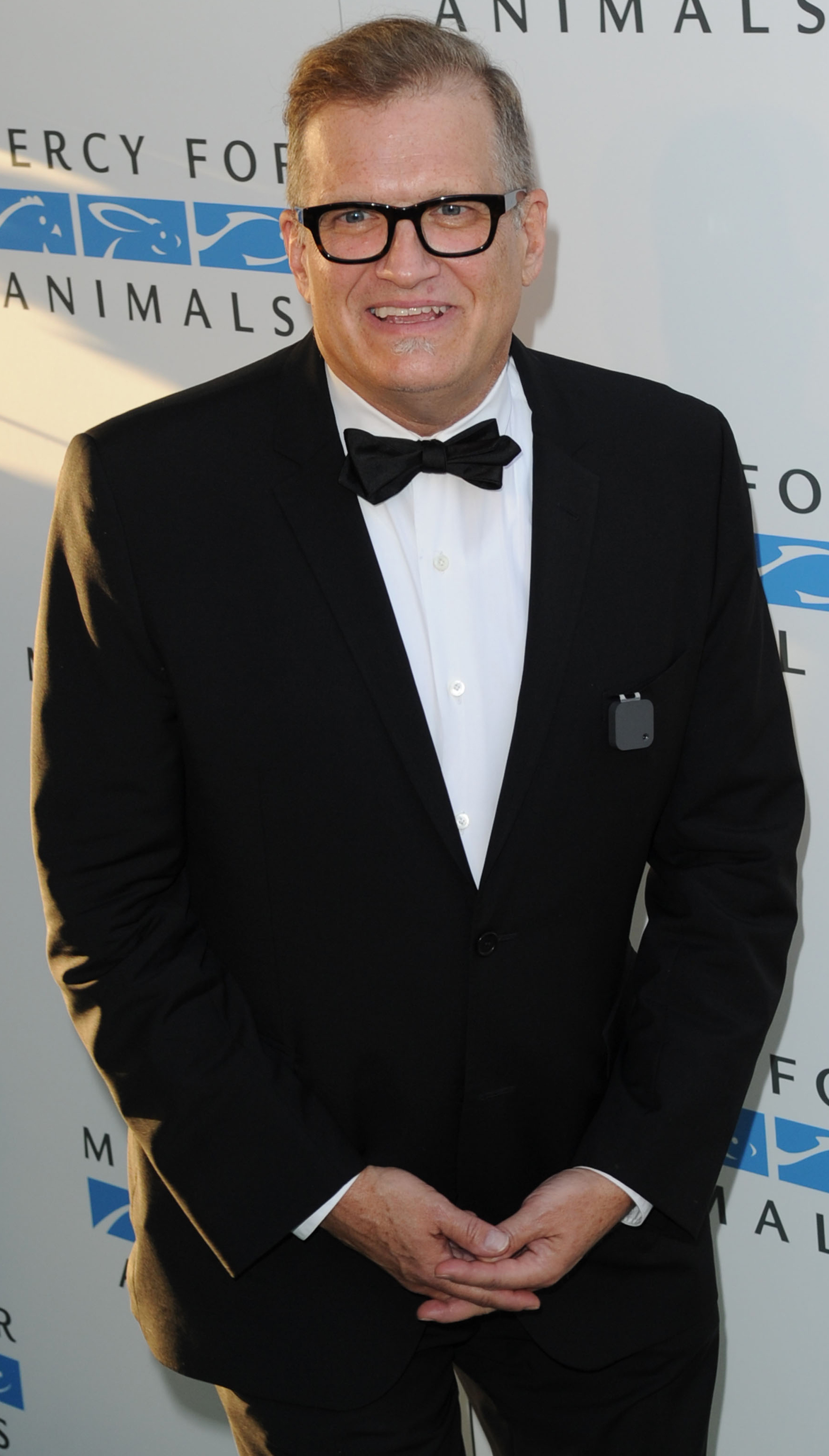
Drew Carey, host of the series and one of its performers

Similar to Whose Line Is It Anyway? and Drew Carey's Green Screen Show, the program features the performers acting in improvisational comedy sketches in front of a live audience using suggestions and participation from the live studio audience viewers. Many American Whose Line alumni return for this show. Each episode consists of three or four improv games, each one introduced by a different cast member, with each game taking up an entire segment. Unlike Whose Line, the series is filmed at the MGM Grand Las Vegas in Paradise, Nevada. Carey himself is a performer and takes part in games with the other cast members.

The series also interacted with the viewing audience by allowing viewers to enter a sweepstakes to win a trip for two to Las Vegas and a stay in the MGM Grand Hotel. One random winner was selected per day for each episode aired.

=== Cast ===
In addition to hosting the show, Carey also serves as one of the main performers. Other members of the cast include Heather Anne Campbell, Jeff Davis, Chip Esten, Kathy Kinney, Jonathan Mangum, Sean Masterson, Colin Mochrie, Greg Proops, Brad Sherwood, Ryan Stiles, and series musician Bob Derkach. Guest performers include Wayne Brady, Charlie Sheen, Steve Kamer, series announcer Rich Fields, and The Price Is Right models Rachel Reynolds, Manuela Arbeláez, Gwendolyn Osborne.

== Production ==
The series, its cast members, and its premiere date were announced on January 10, 2011. On February 16, 2011, GSN announced that the show would premiere alongside Love Triangle. The show premiered on April 11, 2011, at 8:00 p.m. EDT.

On August 25, 2011, Carey announced through Twitter that the show was effectively canceled as GSN would not be ordering any more episodes of Improv-A-Ganza. From November 16, 2012 to January 4, 2013, reruns of the show aired on GSN. The two-hour time slot allowed GSN to air the entire 40 episodes in a 10-week stretch. Laff acquired the rights to the show in 2015, airing it on Saturday nights. The series has never been released on DVD or Blu-ray, although as of June 2023 it's available to stream on TubiTV.

== Reception ==
The A.V. Club's Ryan McGee believed fans of improv would enjoy the show, writing, "what escapes through this series' run should give fans of improv enough pleasure to justify checking in whenever possible." Melinda Houston of The Sydney Morning Herald found the premise of the show "deceptively simple,” but she was "in awe of the intellectual effort involved." She added, "When the laughs do come, they're all the more satisfying for being so surprising and spontaneous. Thoroughly entertaining."

== See also ==
- List of Drew Carey's Improv-A-Ganza episodes
- List of television shows set in Las Vegas
