= Wendy Windham =

American actress

- Born: January 13, 1967 (age 59); Los Angeles, California
- Occupation: actress
- Writing career
- Years active: 1990–present

Wendy Windham (born January 13, 1967) is an American actress, working primarily in Italy.

== Biography ==
The niece of comedian / actor Stan Laurel, Wendy moved to Italy to work in television in 1988, taking part in Il gioco dei nove ("The game of nine") and appearing on Maurizio Costanzo's talk-show. In 1990, she appeared on TG delle vacanze ("News of holidays") and then on programs such as Casa dolce casa ("Home Sweet Home", 1992), i Cervelloni ("Brains", 1994 and 1995) and Faccia tosta (1997).

In 2001 Windham retired from Italian television and retired to private life in Miami, Florida.

== Personal life ==
Windham married the manufacturer Jeff Safchik.

== Filmography ==
=== Film ===
- L'odissea (1991)
- Omicidio a luci blu (1991)
- Gratta e vinci (1996)

=== Television ===
- Raimondo... e le altre – Rai1 1991
- Il TG delle vacanze – Canale 5 1991–1992
- Sabato al circo – Canale 5 1991–1992
- Casa dolce casa – Canale 5 1992–1994
- Dido...menica – Italia 1 – 1992–1993
- Ma mi faccia il piacere... – Italia 1 – 1993
- I cervelloni – Rai1 – 1994/1998
- Il Gioco delle Coppie Beach – Rete 4 – 1994
- I Fatti Vostri – Piazza Italia di sera – Rai2 – 1995–1996
- Miss Italia nel Mondo Rai1 – 1996
- Il Gatto e la Volpe – Canale 5 – 1997
- Faccia Tosta – Rai1 – 1997
- Mezzanotte: Angeli in piazza – Rai1/Rai2 – 1998–1999
