= Jonathan Mangum =

American actor and comedian (born 1971)

- Born: January 16, 1971 (age 55); Charleston, South Carolina, U.S.
- Occupations: Actor, comedian
- Years active: 1993–present
- Spouse: Leah Stanko (m. 2001)
- Children: 2
- Website: www.jonathanmangum.com

Jonathan Joseph Mangum (born January 16, 1971) is an American actor and comedian. He was a cast member of the variety show The Wayne Brady Show and is the announcer for the game show Let's Make a Deal.

== Early life ==
Mangum was born in Charleston, South Carolina and grew up in Mobile, Alabama. After high school, he moved to Orlando and graduated from the University of Central Florida with a degree in psychology. While in Orlando, Mangum started his comedy career at the SAK Comedy Lab alongside Wayne Brady, whom he would later collaborate with in Drew Carey's Improv-A-Ganza, The Wayne Brady Show and Let's Make a Deal. He moved to Los Angeles in 1995 to pursue a career in comedy.

== Career ==
=== Comedy ===
Mangum guest-starred in several episodes as the owner of a web-based start-up company on The Drew Carey Show. He has toured with Drew Carey's Improv All-Stars, establishing himself as an improv comedian and was also a regular cast member on Drew Carey's Green Screen Show. At the beginning of 2011, he and Brady made guest appearances in the British comedy series Fast and Loose, an improv show similar to Whose Line Is It Anyway?. He was a regular performer in Drew Carey's Improv-a-ganza and performed in improvisational singing games, along with co-stars like Jeff B. Davis and Charles Esten. He is also one of the rotating guest performers on the revived CW Whose Line is it Anyway? which started in the summer of 2013.

Starting March 27, 2020, Mangum began live-streaming the show Ujokes, a comedy game show that features two professional comedians. Contestants play mini-games and compete for who has the funniest joke, which is decided by the audience. Along with the comedians, the audience can compete with their own jokes, and the winner from the audience is invited to join next week's stream for a segment. The show is live-streamed on Twitch and YouTube every Monday.

=== Television ===
Mangum made guest appearances on ER, Reno 911!, and Just Shoot Me!. In addition to his work in television and on stage, Mangum has also appeared in over 100 national American commercials. He has written for the Disney Channel and The N, as well as having twice written for director Ben Rock on the short films The Meeting and Conversations, which stars Curtis Armstrong.

In 2012, Mangum starred in the ABC improv comedy series Trust Us with Your Life.

In addition to his role on Let's Make A Deal, he has appeared on The Price is Right during the show's "Mash-Up Week" episodes which aired in 2016, 2019 and 2020.

== Personal life ==
Mangum is married to Leah Stanko, a casting director; the couple have two sons.

== Filmography ==
=== Film ===
Year	Title	Role	Notes
1994	The Upstairs Man	Darren	Short film
1998	Suicide, the Comedy	Carl	
1999	The Meeting	—N/a	Writer
2001	Tea Time	Soldier	Short film
2003	The Devil Made Me Do It	The Angel	Short film
2004	Conversations	—N/a	Short film Writer
2006	Round It Goes		Short film
2006	The Enigma with a Stigma	Andy Thiele	
2007	Manband the Movie	Joey	
2007	The Bucket List	Richard	
2008	iCarly: iGo to Japan	Henri P'Twa	Three-part episode directed by Steve Hoefer turned into a film
2009	Imagine That	Franklin's associate	
2014	House at the End of the Drive	Robert	
2016	Monkey Up	Jim	
2017	Pup Star: Better 2Gether	Rover	Voice
2018	Pup Star: World Tour	Rover	Voice
2018	Smallfoot	Additional voices	Voice
2018	I'll Be Next Door for Christmas	Bradley	
2019	A Patient Man	Tom Alexander	Producer
2020	WRZ: White Racist Zombies	Officer Chomp	Producer
2021	Jon Hamm	Country Club Connor	Short film

=== Television ===
Year	Title	Role	Notes
1993	Welcome Freshmen	Mr. X / Older Boy 1	2 episodes
1993	Clarissa Explains it All	Blind date	Episode: "Blind Date"
1994	Fortune Hunter	Howard	Episode: "Red Alert"
1994	SeaQuest DSV	Covington	Episode: "The Sincerest Form of Flattery"
1996	Roseanne	Flip	Episode: "Hoi Polloi Meets Hoiti Toiti "
1996	Goode Behavior	Wyatt	Episode: "Goode Grades"
1996	Married... with Children	Hal	Episode: "God Rest Ye Merry Bundymen"
1998	Clueless	Garrick	Episode: "Labor of Love"
1998	USA High	Marvin	Episode: "Raphael's Proposal"
1999	Just Shoot Me!	Brian Toliver	Episode: "A Spy in the House of Me"
2000	ER	Ryan Bradford	Episode: "Homecoming"
2000–2001	Strip Mall	Josh MacIntosh	22 episodes
2001	The Wayne Brady Show	Various	1 episode Writer
2002–2004	The Drew Carey Show	Scott	18 episodes
2003	Reno 911!	Yokel	Episode: "Dangle's Moving Day"
2004	Drew Carey’s Green Screen Show	Himself	7 episodes
2004	Everyday Life	Zack	TV movie
2006	Come On Over	Dr. Jonathan Silliness	Episode: "Brain Freeze"
2006	Home Purchasing Club	Jonathan	1 episode Writer
2006	The Brandon T. Jackson Show	—N/a	Writer
2007	The 1/2 Hour News Hour	Various	5 episodes
2007	Pushing Daisies	Bernard Slaybeck	Episode: "Dummy"
2008	NCIS	Special Agent Daniel Keating	Episode: "Last Man Standing"
2009– present	Let's Make a Deal	Himself / Announcer	Producer – 82 episodes
2010	The Sarah Silverman Program	Matt Markus	Episode: "A Slip Slope"
2011	Drew Carey's Improv-A-Ganza	Himself	20 episodes
2012	Trust Us With Your Life	Himself	6 episodes
2013	Doin' It Yourself	—N/a	TV movie Writer
2013–present	Whose Line Is It Anyway?	Himself	Recurring
2014	The Bold and the Beautiful	Allen	1 episode
2015	The BET Honors	—N/a	Writer
2015	The Late Late Show with Craig Ferguson	—N/a	Writer – 5 episodes
2015	Open Carrie	—N/a	Writer
2016	Robots Are Hard	—N/a	TV movie Producer; Writer
2016	History of the World... For Now	Jim, Monty	2 episodes
2016	Milo Murphy's Law	Fernando	TV short Voice; Episode: "The Doctor Zone Files/The Note"
2017	Take It from the Top	Adam	TV movie
2018	GLOW	Priest / Judge Eric	Episode: "Every Potato Has a Receipt"
2019	Chicago Med	Delmer Brendl	Episode: "With a Brave Heart"
2019	Baskets	Tony	Episode: "Mrs. Baskets Goes to Sacrament"
2019	20 Seconds to Live	Daniel	Episode: "Fish"
2019–2020	Live from the 8th Dimension	Dee Fordoo / Dr. Long Island	2 episodes
2020–2021	Ujokes	Host	96 episodes Producer; Writer – 1 episode
2021	Game of Talents	—N/a	Producer
TBA	Relatively Super	Professor Poindexter Powers	TV movie
