= Jeff B. Davis =

American actor and comedian

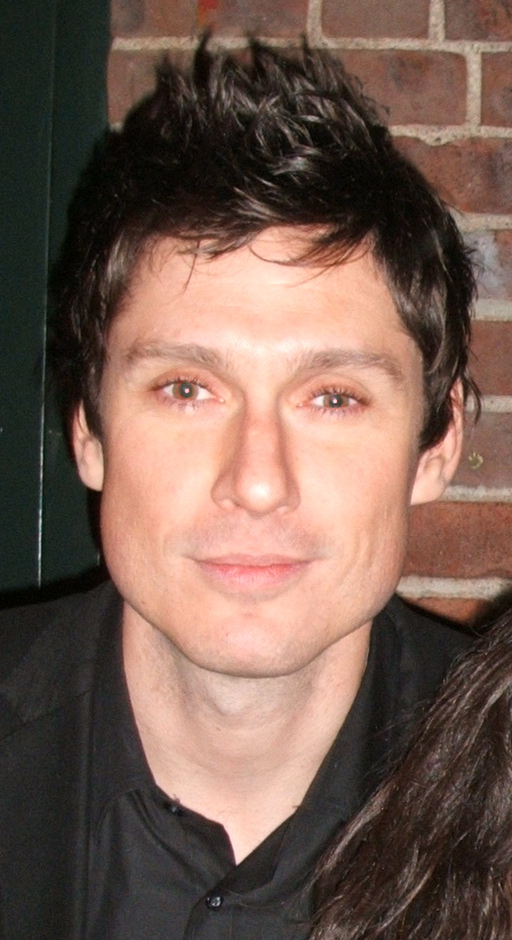
- Davis in 2010
- Born: Jeffrey Bryan Davis; October 6, 1973 (age 53); Los Angeles, California, U.S.
- Occupations: Actor, comedian
- Years active: 1984–present

Jeffrey Bryan Davis (born October 6, 1973) is an American actor, impressionist and comedian. He is known for his work as a recurring performer on the improv comedy show Whose Line Is It Anyway? From July 2016 until October 2019, he has starred as the Goblin Hero Boneweevil on the VRV Direct original production HarmonQuest.

He appeared in Drew Carey's Green Screen Show as one of the main actors. In 2011, Davis appeared on Drew Carey's improv show, Improv-A-Ganza. He is also known for his impersonations of several actors, notably Sam Elliott, Christopher Walken, Keanu Reeves, and Jeff Goldblum. He also had a lead role in 2006's award-winning independent film The Boys & Girls Guide to Getting Down as Marty the housesitter.

== Early life and education ==
Davis was born in Los Angeles and raised in Whittier, California. He began his acting career at the age of four at the Groundlings Theater in Hollywood, playing Linus in You're a Good Man, Charlie Brown. He attended La Serna High School.

Davis started in commercials, and at age 11 he was cast as Louis in the Broadway production of The King and I with Yul Brynner. A national U.S. tour followed, and, after 750 performances, Davis returned home to attend school.

He previously worked at Disneyland in Anaheim, California.

== Career ==
Davis's screen acting debut was a role in the series Highway to Heaven as a 12-year-old college student prodigy. By 1998, Davis was performing with the musical improv group the Impromptones, alongside Joe Whyte, James Thomas Bailey, and Michael Pollock; The Christian Science Monitor reported that the group performed at Austin's Big Stinkin' International Improv & Sketch Comedy Festival, where they received a standing ovation from other performers. He worked with the short-video website Channel 101 and was in the Dan Harmon series Laser Fart. In addition, he played David Lee Roth of Van Halen in an episode of Yacht Rock.

Soon after, Davis landed a recurring role on the improv series Whose Line Is It Anyway?. His comedic timing won over comedian Steve Martin and the other producers of The Downer Channel, earning Davis a spot in the cast of the comedy series in 2001. He has appeared in the television series The Norm Show, The Drew Carey Show, and The Jamie Kennedy Experiment.

He appeared in the telefilm Tuesdays with Morrie and was a series regular in Happy Family, opposite Christine Baranski and John Larroquette. He played an attorney in the October 9, 2008, episode of The Sarah Silverman Program. Davis regularly appears as a guest on the Superego podcast, where he frequently impersonates Sam Elliott.

Davis has toured on "The Improv All Stars" alongside fellow Whose Line stars Drew Carey, Ryan Stiles, Colin Mochrie, Chip Esten, Brad Sherwood, Kathy Greenwood, and Greg Proops. Davis has been part of two USO tours, and he toured with Stiles, Esten, and Proops doing live shows across the U.S. and Canada. Since April 2014 Davis has been touring with Stiles, Proops, and Joel Murray (who replaced Esten) in the improv-comedy troupe Whose Live Anyway? He was often used in games that required improvisational singing and usually partnered with Wayne Brady on Whose Line and Esten on Drew Carey's Green Screen Show or live tours.

Davis was one of the rotating announcers on television's longest-running game show, The Price Is Right, after Rich Fields' departure, until George Gray was chosen as the next permanent announcer. In 2014, Game Show Network announced he would host a game show called The Line.

Starting in 2012 Davis co-hosted the live improvisational comedy podcast Harmontown with Community creator Dan Harmon where he played "Comptroller" to Harmon's "Mayor" role, serving as the show's anchor, announcer, and sidekick until the show ended its run in late 2019. In 2021, Davis, along with Spencer Crittenden and Kevin Day, started the podcast That Happens, wherein conversation is followed by role-playing.

He is often confused with Jeff Davis, the creator of the television series Teen Wolf. In 2020, he appeared on the Teen Wolf episode of Diminishing Returns podcast and gave an interview, posing as the other Jeff Davis.

== Filmography ==
=== Film ===
Film
Year	Title	Role	Notes
2002	Robot Bastard!	Robot Blood Mamba	Short film
2002	Dan Harmon's Batman		Video short
2004	Evil Remains	Eric	
2006	Boys & Girls Guide To Getting Down	Marty	
2006	Trans-plants	C.E.O. Brick Michaels	Short
2006	Just the Three of Us	"McCloud" Guy	Video short
2008	Killer Pad	Backwater	
2009	Bountiful Bounty	Frank	Short
2009	In Loving Memory of Chad	Jeff	Short film
2010	An Evening Without Monty Python	Various	
2010	My Funny Valentine	Joel	
2015	Amigo Undead	Sheriff Maynard	
2019	Holiday Hell	Tom	
2020	Izzy Lyon: The Unspun Truth	Ritchy Rounds	

=== Television ===
Television
Year	Title	Role	Notes
1986	Highway To Heaven	Christopher Gunn	Season 3, episode 9: "Code Name: FREAK"
1999	Tuesdays with Morrie	A capella Singer #2	TV movie
1999	Oblique		TV short
2001	The Test	Himself/Panelist	Episode 74: "The Reality Test"
2001–2002	The Drew Carey Show	Himself/D'Artagnan	2 episodes
2000–01, 2003, 2005–06; 2013–present	Whose Line Is It Anyway?	Regular performer	
2000	Norm	Terry	Season 3, episode 5: "Norm vs. Halloween"
2001	The Downer Channel	Various	
2001	House of Cards		TV movie
2003	On the Spot	Jeff Miller	5 episodes Credited as Jeff B. Davis
2003	Ultraforce	Colonel Samuel Price	
2003	Computerman	Agent Chapman	4 episodes
2003	Happy Family	Todd Brennan	
2003	Pyramid	Himself/Celebrity panelist	2 episodes
2004	Call Me Cobra		TV short Uncredited
2004	Twigger's Holiday	Michelle's Father	Episode #1.5
2004–2005	Laser Fart	Jeff	Stunts
2004–2005	Drew Carey's Green Screen Show	Regular performer	
2005	Joey	Martin	Season 1, episode 14: "Joey and the Premiere"
2005	Jake in Progress	The Waiter	Episode: "Check Please"
2005	House of Cosbys	Mitchell Reynolds / Mitchell	Voice
2005	Awesometown	Cowboy	Unaired pilot
2006	The Wastelander	Bicycle Cop	TV series short Episode #1.3
2006	Yacht Rock	David Lee Roth	Episode: "Runnin' with the Devil"
2006	Woria: Queen of Power	Monstro	TV short
2006–2007	Exposure	Ash	Credited as Jeff Davis
2007	Bad Day		
2007	Cautionary Tales of Swords	Anchorman	Episode 3
2007–2008	The Sarah Silverman Program	Lawyer	4 episodes
2008	True Blood	Undercover Cop	Season 1, episode 4: "Escape from Dragon House"
2008	Moral Orel	Miss Secondopinionson / Busy Dad Toss-o-Matic	Voice; 2 episode
2008	The Madness of Jane	John Mossbechar	TV movie
2009	The Quest for the Golden Hot Dog	Hungry Hipster	Episode: "Welcome Eaters"
2009	Water and Power	Jeff	Episode: "Ryan Leaves for Israel"
2009	Crappy Holidays Presents...		2 episodes
2010	Melrose Place	Simon	Episode 17: "Sepulveda"
2010	Hunk of Metal		TV short
2010	Uncle Nigel		TV movie
2010	The Price Is Right	Guest announcer	September–November
2010–2012	Mary Shelley's Frankenhole	Victor Frankenstein	20 episodes
2011	Drew Carey's Improv-A-Ganza	Regular performer	
2011	Squidbillies		Voice; Season 6 episode 4: "Big E"
2012	Suits	Zielinski	Season 2, episode 9: "Asterisk"
2012	SuperF***ers	Super Dan / Polka Dots	Voice
2013	Falcon Man	Lenny	Episode 1
2013	Doin' It Yourself	Glee Boy	TV movie
2014	Car-Jumper	Brad Killian	Episode #1.17
2014	Space Work		TV short
2014	Santiago	Music Manager	Episode 3
2014	The Line	Co-host	
2016	Fuller House	Wrestling Announcer	Season 1 episode 6: "The Legend of El Explosivo"
2016	Bajillion Dollar Propertie$	Dirk	Season 1 episode 2: "Uncle Jerry"
2016	Hidden America with Jonah Ray	Goodman Steve	Season 1, episode 1: "Boston: Where Past Is Present"
2016–2019	HarmonQuest	Himself/Boneweevil	30 episodes
2017	Rick and Morty	"Simple Rick's" Voiceover	Voice; Season 3, episode 7: "The Ricklantis Mixup"
2020	Diminishing Returns	Jeff Davis, Creator of MTV's Teen Wolf / Jeff Davis, Not the Creator of MTV's Teen Wolf	3 episodes
2021	That Happens		Episode: "Nazis Notwithstanding"

=== Podcast ===
Podcast
Year	Title	Role	Notes
2012-2017	Harmontown	—N/a	Writer; Director; 195 episodes Uncredited
2022	Roborockalypse	Jeff	

Media offices
Preceded by Rich Fields	Acting announcer of The Price is Right; 2010–2011; Served alongside: Brad Sherwood, JD Roberto and others	Succeeded by George Gray
