= On the Spot (2003 TV series) =

2003 American TV sketch comedy series

- Also known as: Untitled Jeff Davis Project
- Genre: Comedy
- Created by: Robert Cohen
- Written by: Robert Cohen
- Directed by: Michael Dimich; Gerry Cohen
- Country of origin: United States
- Original language: English
- No. of seasons: 1
- No. of episodes: 5

Production
- Producers: Robert Cohen; Chris Plourde; Gerry Cohen
- Camera setup: Videotape
- Running time: 30 minutes
- Production company: Warner Bros. Television

Original release
- Network: The WB
- Release: March 20 – April 17, 2003

On the Spot is an American television sketch comedy series which aired from March 20 to April 17, 2003 on The WB. The show consisted of a mixture of scripted sketches and improvisational comedy.

== Format ==
The show was based in a Malibu hotel called The Sunspot with various colorful characters. The show constantly played the improvisation game "New Choice" in which a bell would ring and the actor speaking would have to change the line they just finished.

== Cast ==
=== Main ===
- Charles Esten as himself/host
- Jeff B. Davis as Jeff Miller
- Erinn Hayes as Brenda
- Jordan Black as Monty the Bartender
- Arden Myrin as Caramel the Maid
- Mindy Sterling as Fifi
- Michael Hitchcock as The Professor
- Tim Conway as Mr. Henderson
- Dweezil Zappa as band leader

=== Recurring ===
- Lance Barber as various characters
- Lindsey Stoddart as various characters

=== Guest stars ===
- Tenacious D as themselves

== Episodes ==
| No. | Title | Original release date | Prod. code | Viewers (millions) |
|---|---|---|---|---|
| 1 | "Pilot" | March 20, 2003 | 175952 | 3.2 |
| 2 | "Little Brenda Dynamite" | March 27, 2003 | 175953 | N/A |
| 3 | "Bachelorette Party" | April 3, 2003 | 175954 | 1.9 |
| 4 | "Hooker Convention" | April 10, 2003 | 175955 | 2 |
| 5 | "One-Star Hotel" | April 17, 2003 | 175956 | 1.6 |
