= Charles Esten =

American actor, musician and comedian

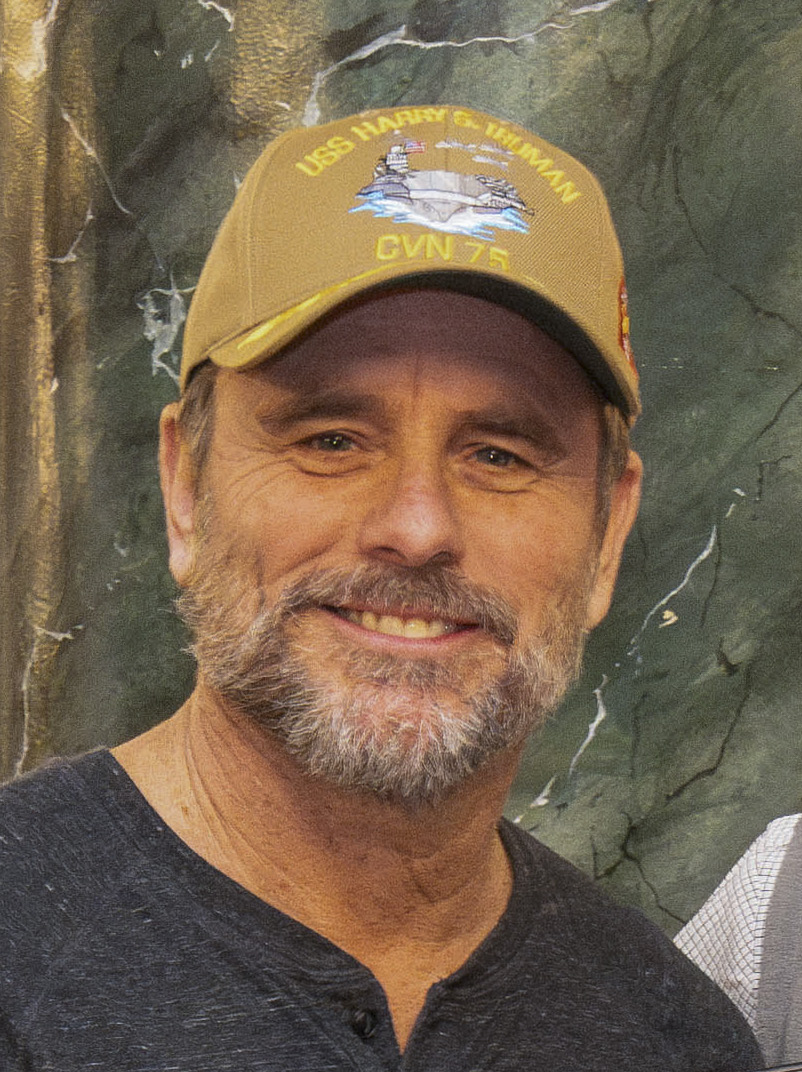
- Esten in 2024
- Born: September 9, 1965 (age 61); Pittsburgh, Pennsylvania, U.S.
- Other name: Chip Esten
- Education: College of William and Mary
- Occupations: Actor; musician; singer-songwriter; comedian
- Years active: 1988–present
- Spouse: Patty Hanson (m. 1991)
- Children: 3
- Website: charlesesten.com

Charles Esten (born September 9, 1965) also known professionally as Chip Esten, is an American actor, musician, singer-songwriter, and improv comedian.

Esten played the role of country singer Deacon Claybourne on the drama Nashville from 2012 to 2018, which subsequently kickstarted his own musical career. He also played Ward Cameron on the teen drama series Outer Banks. He appeared in the improvisation show Whose Line Is It Anyway? as a series regular between 1999–2005 and returned with guest appearances from 2017–2020.

== Early life ==
Esten was born in Pittsburgh, Pennsylvania, and moved to Alexandria, Virginia, at age nine, after his parents divorced. He and his younger sister were raised by their mother.

His late father, Charles, was a prominent local businessman and business partner of former Pittsburgh Steelers center Ray Mansfield.

Esten is a 1983 graduate of Alexandria's T.C. Williams High School, where he played football for the Titans a decade after the events of the film Remember the Titans. He then attended his parents' and sister's alma mater, the College of William and Mary, where he was a member of Theta Delta Chi fraternity and graduated with a degree in economics in 1987. At William and Mary, he was the lead vocalist in the local band "N'est Pas" from 1985–88. Following graduation, Esten moved to the United Kingdom to make his theatrical debut, playing the title role in the musical Buddy in the early 1990s.

Esten's first television appearance was in December 1988 as a contestant on the NBC game show Sale of the Century (under the name Chip Puskar). He won over $32,000 in cash and prizes in five episodes (December 13–19); he later sold his prizes.

== Career ==
=== Whose Line Is It Anyway? ===
In 1992, Esten made his debut on the UK improvised comedy show Whose Line Is It Anyway?; the show was looking to add more specialist improvisational singers in addition to Mike McShane. After winning his first episode, he made subsequent appearances on the show's fourth series, which was part-filmed in New York. After making his final appearance in the UK edition in 1994 he moved back to America and focused on stage and screen before debuting on the show's American iteration, hosted by Drew Carey, in 1999. He became a regular cast member on the show, often paired with series regular Wayne Brady on musical games. Although Esten did not feature on the show when it was revived in 2013 due to his commitments on Nashville, he eventually returned as a regular improviser in season 15.

=== Other comedy work ===
Following his return to Whose Line Is It Anyway, Esten made a guest appearance as himself with fellow regular cast members from the show Wayne Brady, Greg Proops and Brad Sherwood on The Drew Carey Show. In 2003, he hosted a semi-improvised comedy mini series called On the Spot. Between 2004–06, he was a member of the touring group Improv All-Stars and recurring cast member on Drew Carey's Green Screen Show.

In 2011, he was a regular on Drew Carey's Improv-A-Ganza on GSN. Esten and fellow former Whose Line Is It Anyway stars Greg Proops, Ryan Stiles and Jeff Davis regularly teamed up and tour around the country doing live improv under the name Whose Live Anyway?. In April 2014, Esten left Whose Live Anyway? due to his role in Nashville, and was replaced by Joel Murray but later became a recurring member with the rest of the cast members during tours once Nashville had ended.

=== Film appearances ===
In 2001, Esten appeared in Billy Crystal's TV movie 61* as Kevin Maris, the son of legendary New York Yankees slugger Roger Maris. He had small roles in three Kevin Costner movies, The Postman, Thirteen Days as downed U-2 pilot Major Rudolf Anderson, and Swing Vote.

=== Television ===
Esten has appeared as a guest star in various TV series, including Married... with Children, The New Adventures of Old Christine, Star Trek: The Next Generation, Star Trek: Voyager, ER, NCIS: Los Angeles, Jessie, The Mentalist, and The Office.

From 2012 to 2018, he was part of the main cast of Nashville, starring as Deacon Claybourne. He has also contributed to the soundtracks as both a singer and songwriter. He co-wrote "I Know How to Love You Now" with Deana Carter, which was featured in the season 3 premiere. Starting in 2020, he was one of the stars of the Netflix series, Outer Banks, playing Ward Cameron.

In 2013, he appeared as a celebrity contestant on Who Wants to Be a Millionaire and won $500,000 for his charity.

In 2017, Esten was cast in a series of television and radio advertisements as Carl Hardee Sr., the fictional founder of the Carl's Jr. and Hardee's fast food chains.

On July 9, 2018, it was announced that Esten was cast in a recurring role in the TNT thriller Tell Me Your Secrets.

=== Music ===
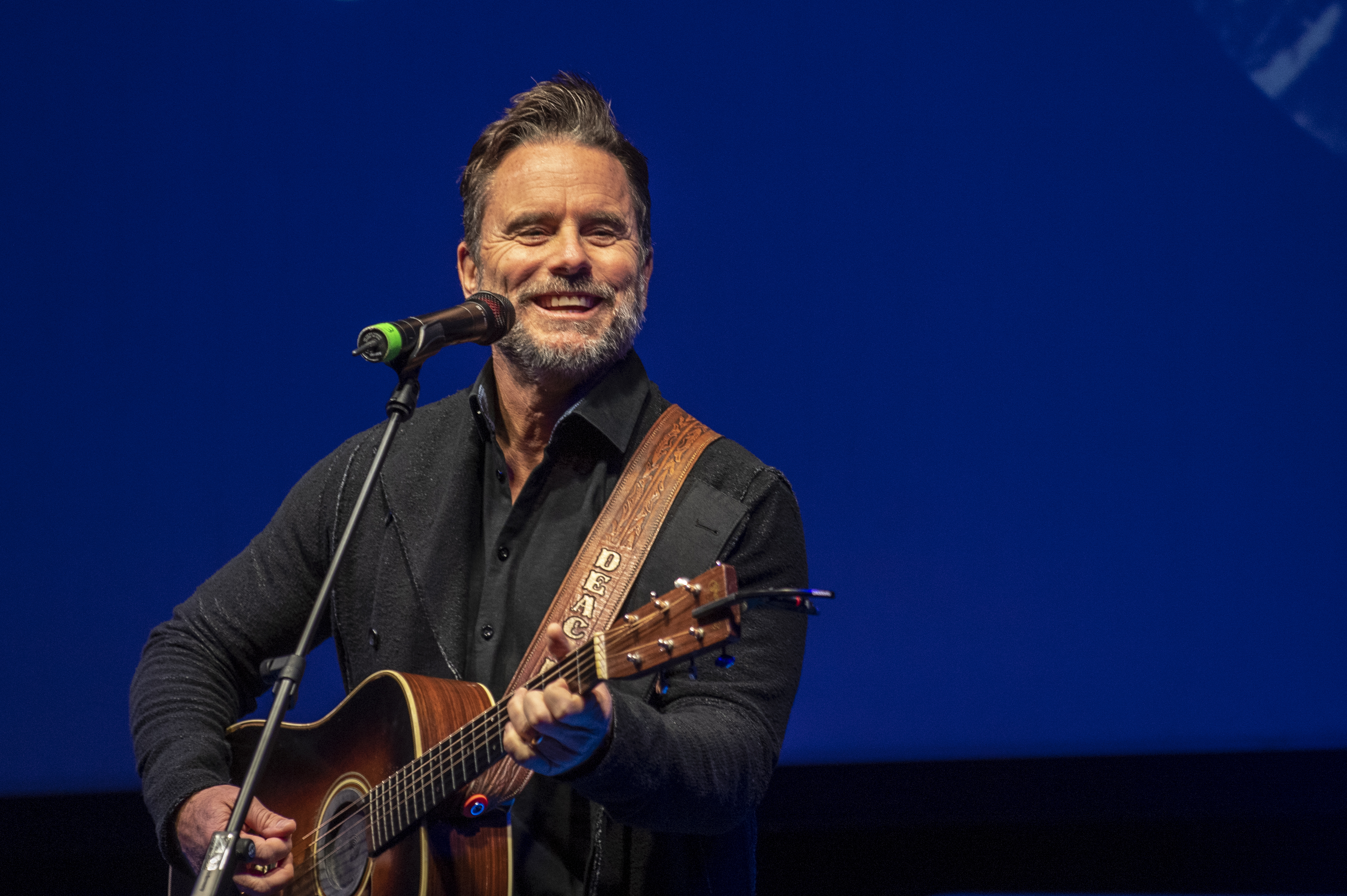
Charles Esten performing at a variety show in 2024

On July 25, 2018, Esten was awarded the Guinness World Records title of "The most consecutive weeks to release an original digital single by a music act". He was presented with the certificate following a performance of his single, Halfway Home, on NBC's Today. His #EverySingleFriday project was announced via his Twitter page July 1, 2016 and ran from July 15th of that year through July 21, 2017. Over the course of 54 weeks Esten delivered a new single each Friday, which he himself wrote or co-wrote. Artists featured throughout the project include Ashley Campbell, Colin Linden, Steve Mandile of Sixwire, Sarah Siskind, Karla Davis, and Miss Jackie Wilson.

Esten is a frequent performer on the Grand Ole Opry. His 100th performance was celebrated with his appearance on the program on July 20, 2018. On February 4, 2023, Esten filled in as host of the Saturday live performance segment of the Grand Ole Opry, his first appearance in that role.

On May 15, 2019, it was announced that Esten had signed with APA's concert division for music representation. He continues to tour across the U.S. and Europe, performing his original music.

In 2023, Esten announced the release of "One Good Move", the debut single from his upcoming debut studio album, set for independent release later in the year. "Love Ain't Pretty" was released as the second single from the album, later revealed to be set for release on January 26, 2024.

== Personal life ==
Esten is married to Patty Hanson, whom he met in college. They have three children. The family moved to Nashville after Esten was cast as a series regular on Nashville.

Esten is national chairman for the annual Light the Night Walks, a fundraiser benefiting The Leukemia & Lymphoma Society (LLS). His daughter is a leukemia survivor.

== Filmography ==
=== Film ===
Year	Work	Role	Notes
1996	Wing Commander IV: The Price of Freedom	Generic Cap #1	Video game, voice role
1997	The Postman	Michael, Abby's Husband	
2000	Thirteen Days	Maj. Rudolf Anderson	
2001	Roots of the Cuban Missile Crisis	Major Anderson	Video documentary
2002	Ten Minutes Older: The Trumpet	Bill	segment "Twelve Miles to Trona"
2003	Water Under the Bridge	Don	
2003	Nobody Knows Anything!	Conner Fulton	
2007	American Family	Larry Bogner	
2008	1%	John Tipton	
2008	Swing Vote	Lewis	(as Charles 'Chip' Esten)
2024	The Easy Kind	Tye	
2025	Signing Tony Raymond	Coach Crew Marshall	
2026	Grizzly Night	Gary Bunney	
2026	Drummer Boy	Balfour	

=== TV ===
Year	Work	Role	Notes
1988	Sale of the Century	Self/Contestant	4 episodes (as Chip Puskar)
1989	On the Television	various	5 episodes
1990	Scrabble	Self/Contestant	1 episode (as Chip Puscar)
1992, 1994	Whose Line Is It Anyway (UK)	Self/Performer	8 episodes (as Chip Esten)
1993	Cheers	unnamed marine	1 episode
1993	Star Trek: The Next Generation	Divok	Episode: "Rightful Heir"
1994	Murphy Brown	Secretary #67	1 episode
1995–1996	The Crew	Randy Anderson	Main cast
1996	Star Trek: Voyager	Dathan	Episode: "Remember"
1996	Diagnosis: Murder	Joe Carter	1 episode
1996	Lois & Clark: The New Adventures of Superman	Ethan Press	Episode: "Stop the Presses"
1997	JAG	Lieutenant Pete 'Pistol' Ayers	1 episode
1997	Married... with Children	Lonnie	2 episodes
1997	The Sleepwalker Killing	Mark Schall	Made-for-TV movie
1998–2000	The Brian Benben Show	Chad Rockwell	Main cast
1998	Instant Comedy with the Groundlings	Self	TV series
1999–2005, 2017–2020	Whose Line Is It Anyway (US)	Self/Performer	Recurring (Seasons 2–8), Guest (Seasons 13–16) (all as Chip Esten)
1999	Jesse	Tad	1 episode
1999	Jack & Jill	Nick Seraph	1 episode
1999	The Expendables	Ram	Made-for-TV movie
1999	Late Last Night	Beverly Hills Cop	Made-for-TV movie
1999	Providence	Ted Shannon	1 episode
2000	Party of Five	Luke	Recurring role (Season 6)
2000	My VH1 Music Awards	Self	TV special documentary (as Chip Esten)
2000–2001	The Drew Carey Show	Chip / Stall for Time Player #1	2 episodes
2001	Hollywood Squares	Self	2 episodes (as Chip Esten)
2001	The Trouble with Normal	Carson	Episode: "Unconventional Behavior"
2001	61*	Kevin Maris ('98)	Made-for-TV movie (as Chip Esten)
2001	Drew Carey's Improv All Stars	Self/Performer	TV special (as Chip Esten)
2002	The Guardian	Mark Hanson	1 episode
2002	The Johnny Chronicles	Patrick Monroe	Made-for-TV movie
2002	Rendez-View	Self	Episode: "Freak-a-thon"
2003	On the Spot	Self/Host	Main cast
2003	L.A. Dragnet	Carl Savitsky	1 episode
2003	All Grown Up!		Made-for-TV movie
2003	Just Shoot Me!	Jake	1 episode
2003	Rocket Power	Story writer	Episode: "A Rocket X-mas"
2004–2005	Drew Carey's Green Screen Show	Self/Performer	Recurring (as Chip Esten)
2004	NYPD Blue	Tim Keating	1 episode
2004	Cold Case	John "The Hawk" Hawkins	1 episode
2004	The Magical Gathering	Self	Made-for-TV movie (as Chip Esten)
2006	The Office	Josh Porter	Guest (Season 2), Recurring role (Season 3)
2007	Help Me Help You	Willis	Episode: "Moving On"
2007	The Winner	Gary	Episode: "Broken Home"
2007	The New Adventures of Old Christine	Joe Campbell	2 episodes
2007–2008	ER	Dr. Barry Grossman	4 episodes
2009–2010	Big Love	Ray Henry	Recurring role (Season 3), Guest (Season 4)
2009	The Mentalist	Rick Bregman	1 episode
2009	The Cleaner	Dr. Jake Slovak	Episode: "An Ordinary Man"
2009	NCIS: Los Angeles	John Cole/Ethan Stanhope	1 episode
2011	Wilfred	Nick	2 episodes
2011	Drew Carey's Improv-A-Ganza	Self/Performer	Main cast (as Chip Esten)
2011	Jessie	Morgan Ross	4 episodes
2011	Enlightened	Damon Manning	Recurring role
2012–2018	Nashville	Deacon Claybourne	Main cast; 124 episodes Nominated—Guild of Music Supervisors Award for Best Song Written and/or Recorded for Television
2012	Nashville: The Whole Story	Self/Narrator	TV special
2013	Nashville: On the Record	Self	TV special
2013	Who Wants to Be a Millionaire	Self	2 episodes
2014	Nashville: On the Record 2	Self	TV special
2015	Nashville: On the Record 3	Self	TV special
2017	CMT Music Awards	Self/Host	
2020–2023	Outer Banks	Ward Cameron	Main cast; 28 episodes
2020	Country Music Association Awards	Self/Presenter	
2021	Tell Me Your Secrets	Saul Barlow	4 episodes
2023-2025	The Kelly Clarkson Show	Self/Musical Guest	3 episodes
2024–present	Homestead: The Series	Cain Ross	

== Discography ==
=== Albums ===
==== Studio albums ====
Title	Album details
Love Ain't Pretty	Released: January 26, 2024; Label: Self-released; Format: Digital download, streaming

=== Singles ===
Year	Single	Peak chart positions		Sales	Album
Year	Single	US Country	US	Sales	Album
2012	"Undermine" (with Hayden Panettiere)^{A}	35	116		The Music of Nashville: Season 1 Volume 1
2012	"No One Will Ever Love You" (with Connie Britton)^{A}	36	117		The Music of Nashville: Season 1 Volume 1
2013	"This Town" (with Clare Bowen)	41	—		The Music of Nashville: Season 2, Volume 1
2017	"Sanctuary" (with Lennon & Maisy)	31	—	US: 9,000	The Music of Nashville: Season 5, Volume 1
2020	"Strong" (with Jillian Cardarelli)	—	—		
2023	"One Good Move"	—	—		Love Ain't Pretty
2023	"A Little Right Now"	—	—		Love Ain't Pretty
2023	"In a Bar Somewhere"	—	—		Love Ain't Pretty
2023	"Down the Road" (featuring Eric Paslay)	—	—		Love Ain't Pretty
2023	"Somewhere in the Sunshine"	—	—		Love Ain't Pretty
2024	"Make You Happy" / "When Love Ain't Love"^{B}	—	—		Love Ain't Pretty
2024	"—" denotes releases that did not chart				

- ^{A}Did not enter the Hot 100 but charted on Bubbling Under Hot 100 Singles.
- ^{B} "When Love Ain't Love" is the B-side to the single "Make You Happy."
