= The Big Moment =

1999 American television game show

- Genre: Game show
- Based on: Happy Family Plan
- Written by: Lou DiMaggio; Andrew J. Golder; Kevin Healey; Scott Hallock; Mike Maddocks
- Directed by: Rob Katz
- Presented by: Brad Sherwood
- Narrated by: John Cramer
- Composer: Jeff Koz
- Country of origin: United States
- Original language: English

Production
- Executive producers: Vin Di Bona; Richard Brustein
- Editors: Eric Johannsen; Tim Counihan; Michael Berkowitz
- Running time: 60 minutes (first 2 shows only); 30 minutes
- Production companies: Vin Di Bona Productions; Richard Brustein Entertainment

Original release
- Network: ABC
- Release: April 3 – June 26, 1999

The Big Moment is an American television game show based on the original Japanese version called Happy Family Plan. It aired on ABC in 1999 and was hosted by Brad Sherwood. John Cramer served as announcer. It was originally an hour-long series, but due to low ratings, was cut to a half-hour after its second episode.

== Format ==
The show's premise centered on one member of a family (or group of people) who was given one week to practice a certain task before the episode's taping. A video camera was provided to record the rehearsal process at home. At the end of the week, the contestant (and his/her family and other supporters) came to the studio to perform the task. The contestant was given only one attempt; if successful, he/she won a pre-selected prize package worth $25,000. If unsuccessful, he/she received a $2,000 consolation prize. Two contestants appeared each episode.

Some of the stunts presented:

- Memorizing pi to the 100th decimal
- Playing Beethoven's Für Elise on a piano, without missing a note
- Answering ten questions on the film Ghost
- Riding around three cones on a unicycle and returning to a starting line
- Pulling a tablecloth out from a fully set table without any items hitting the floor or glasses being knocked over (this stunt was featured at least twice)
- Identifying 12 random flavors of Baskin-Robbins ice cream while blindfolded
- Teaching a puppy 5 new tricks

On later episodes, Sherwood went into the audience after the first contestant's stunt and randomly selected someone to perform a task at the end of the show (after some time to train for the task). Tasks included memorizing other audience members' names and birth months, spontaneously crying within 30 seconds, and breaking into a car on stage within 90 seconds. If successful, he/she won $5,000.
