= Brad Sherwood =

American improv comedian (born 1964)

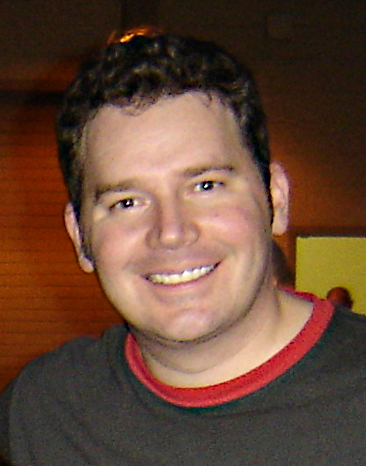
- Sherwood in 2006
- Born: November 24, 1964 (age 61); Chicago, Illinois, US
- Education: Wright State University (BFA)
- Occupations: Actor; singer; comedian; game show host
- Years active: 1987–present

Bradley Sherwood (born November 24, 1964) is an American actor, singer, comedian, game show host and writer. He is best known for his work on the British and American versions of comedy improvisation show Whose Line Is It Anyway?.

== Career ==
Following graduation from Wright State University, his first acting job was a recurring role on L.A. Law as Ned Barron, which lasted for six episodes from 1991 to 1992.

Sherwood was introduced to improv after being encouraged to attend a comedy class in Los Angeles, and he joined the cast of the syndicated sketch-comedy series The Newz in 1994.

In 1992, Sherwood appeared in two episodes of the fourth season of the British improvisational comedy television show Whose Line Is It Anyway?. He was the only actor from that year's Los Angeles auditions to make it to the cast. In 1997 he returned to the show, becoming a regular performer during the last two seasons. He then joined the American version of Whose Line Is It Anyway? which began after the British version ended and originally aired on the American broadcaster ABC. The American version was hosted by comedian Drew Carey. Sherwood later made a guest appearance in three episodes of Carey's sitcom The Drew Carey Show. He was also a producer and performer on Drew Carey's Green Screen Show (2005) and a performer on Drew Carey's Improv-A-Ganza (2011).

In 2013, the American broadcast network The CW revived Whose Line?, on which Sherwood has made occasional appearances.

Sherwood hosted The Dating Game from 1996 to 1997 and The Big Moment in 1999, and was a guest host on Talk Soup. He has also been a regular panelist on To Tell the Truth, Jury Duty, and Hollywood Squares.

He regularly appears on numerous VH-1 series, including I Love the 70s, I Love the 80s, I Love the 90s, 100 One-Hit Wonders of The 80s, 100 Greatest Rock Ballads, I Love Toys, and Greatest Game Show Moments. He was a guest on Larry King Live and a regular panelist on Chelsea Lately.

=== Other work ===
In 2003, Sherwood teamed up with fellow Whose Line? performer Colin Mochrie for a two-man improv show titled An Evening With Colin Mochrie and Brad Sherwood. On March 28, 2007, Sherwood and Mochrie performed at the Congressional Radio and Television Correspondents' Association Dinner in Washington, D.C.

In 2010–11, Sherwood was one of a rotating group of guest announcers on American TV show The Price Is Right before George Gray was chosen as the next permanent announcer.

== Filmography ==
Year	Title	Roles	Notes
1987	White Out	Stooge #3	Short
1991	Life As We Know It!	Gangster	TV movie
1991-1992	L.A. Law	Ned Barron	5 episodes
1992-1998	Whose Line Is It Anyway? (UK)	Himself	17 episodes
1994	Attack of the 5 Ft. 2 Women	Mime	TV movie
1994	The Newz	Various	TV series
1997	That Darn Cat	Agent #2	
1997	The Dating Game	Himself	Host
1998-2023	Whose Line Is It Anyway? (US)	Himself	74 episodes
1998	The Night Caller	Andy Saden	
1998	Short Cinema		Video
1999	Dill Scallion	Brad Statlin	
1999	The Big Moment	Himself	Host
1999-2001	The Drew Carey Show	Brad Sherwood / Baby in Baby Carriage / Brad	3 episodes
2001	Talk Soup	Himself	Host
2001	Hollywood Squares	Himself - panelist	3 episodes
2001	Improv All Stars	Himself	
2001	Disney's California Adventure TV Special	Himself	TV special short
2001	The Test	Himself - panelist	
2001	Rendez-View	Himself - Guest host	TV series short
2001-2002	To Tell the Truth	Himself - panelist	2 episodes
2002	Jane White Is Sick & Twisted	Homeless Man	
2002	Lloyd in Space	Cheery Theerlap, Lloyd	TV series
2003	Punkin Chunkin	Himself - Host	1 episode
2004	Green Screen Show	Himself	3 episodes
2004	TV Guide Close Up: From Comedy Club to Primetime	Himself	TV movie documentary
2005	I Love the '90s: Part Deux	Himself	TV mini series documentary
2005	I Love the 80's 3-D	Himself	TV series documentary, 2 episodes
2005	Just for Laughs	Himself	TV series documentary
2006	The Tonight Show with Jay Leno	Various	TV series
2006	I Love Toys	Himself	TV series documentary
2006	I Love the '70s: Volume 2	Himself	2 episodes
2007	Wiener Takes All: A Dogumentary	Himself	documentary
2007	Entertainment Weekly & TV Land Present: The 50 Greatest TV Icons	Himself	TV special documentary
2007	Smartest Guy in Town	Himself - host	
2008	Digimon Data Squad	Gallantmon	5 episodes
2008	Chelsea Lately	Himself	1 episode
2008	I Love the New Millennium	Himself	3 episodes
2008	Punkin Chunkin	Himself - Host	
2009	The Greatest	Himself	TV series documentary
2009	Flipping Out	Himself	3 episodes
2010	The Price Is Right	Himself - Guest Announcer	20 episodes
2011	Colin & Brad: Two Man Group	Himself	
2011	Drew Carey's Improv-A-Ganza	Himself	17 episodes
2012	Trust Us with Your Life	Himself	2 episodes
2012	Hollywood Uncensored with Same Rubin	Himself - Host	Video
2017	The Legionnaires of Laughter	Himself - Host	Video
2017	The Man Cave Chronicles Podcast	Himself	Podcast series
2018	Caroline & Friends	Himself	3 episodes
2019	Colin & Brad: Out of the Box	Himself	
2020	Ujokes	Himself	3 episode
2020	Penn & Teller: Fool Us	Himself - Special Guest	1 episode
2021	The Good, the Bad, and the Sequel	Himself	Podcast series

Filmography courtesy of IMDb.

Media offices
Preceded by Jeff MacGregor (1988–89)	Host of The Dating Game; 1996–1997	Succeeded by Chuck Woolery (1997–2000)
Preceded by Rich Fields	Acting announcer of The Price Is Right; 2010–2011; Served alongside: Jeff Davis, JD Roberto and others	Succeeded by George Gray
