= Ryan Stiles =

American-Canadian comedian and actor

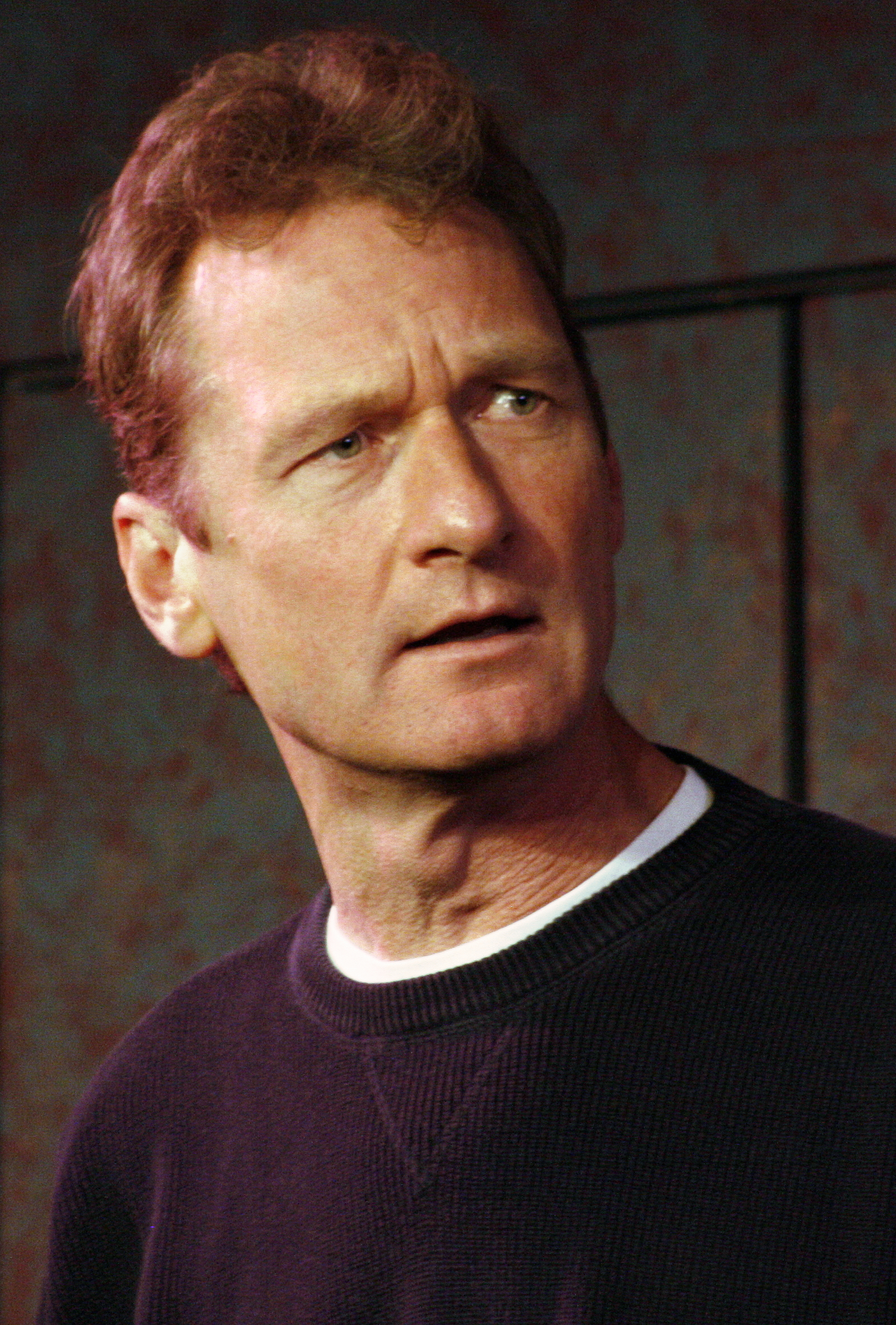
- Stiles in November 2008
- Born: Ryan Lee Stiles; April 22, 1959 (age 67); Seattle, Washington, U.S.
- Notable work: British and American versions of Whose Line Is It Anyway?; Lewis Kiniski on The Drew Carey Show; Herb Melnick on Two and a Half Men
- Spouse: Patricia McDonald (m. 1988)
- Children: 3

Comedy career
- Years active: 1985–present
- Medium: Stand up, television, film
- Genre: Improvisational comedy

Ryan Lee Stiles (born April 22, 1959) is an American-Canadian comedian and actor. His work is often associated with improvisational comedy. He is best known for his work on Whose Line Is It Anyway? (both the original British version and the subsequent American version) and for his role as Lewis Kiniski on The Drew Carey Show. He also played Herb Melnick on the CBS comedy Two and a Half Men and was a performer on the show Drew Carey's Improv-A-Ganza.

== Early life and career ==
The youngest of five children, Ryan Stiles was born in Seattle to Canadian parents Irene and Sonny Stiles. He grew up with his mother, a homemaker, and his father, a supervisor at a Vancouver-based Canadian fish processing plant. When he was ten, his family moved to Vancouver, British Columbia. Ryan Stiles attended R.C. Palmer Junior Secondary School and Richmond Senior Secondary in Richmond, British Columbia. Although he was a good student, Stiles has admitted that "being a high-school senior gave [him] too much freedom." He got so carried away with his flexible schedule that at age 17, he quit school a few months shy of graduation.

Despite his parents' objections, he was able to support himself doing stand-up routines at clubs near his home in Vancouver. He helped Rich Elwood start Punchlines Comedy Club. During this time, he was the head writer of The Don Harron Show on CTV and the host of Comedy College on CBC. Stiles was a regular improv performer with the Vancouver Theatresports League and Punchlines' "No Name Player" before joining the Second City comedy ensemble at Expo 86. He continued performing with Second City in Toronto and later in Los Angeles.

== Career ==
=== Whose Line Is It Anyway? and The Drew Carey Show ===
By 1989, Stiles had gained the attention of the producers of the British improvisational comedy show Whose Line Is It Anyway? Stiles was a regular on the show until its end in 1998. His performance on the program earned him both critical praise and a devoted fan following in the United Kingdom. In 1995, Stiles was asked by American comic Drew Carey to be a regular on his sitcom The Drew Carey Show. Stiles played Carey's erudite but underachieving best friend, Lewis Kiniski.

In 1998, Carey successfully lobbied ABC to produce an American version of Whose Line Is It Anyway? Following the final season of the British version in 1998, the American version premiered, with both Stiles and Carey credited as executive producers. Stiles received a nomination for the Primetime Emmy Award for Outstanding Individual Performance in a Variety or Music Program in 2002 for his work on the show. A running gag of the show is Stiles' flashy dress shoes as well as his frequent impressions of American actress Carol Channing.

Though he never appeared in the series, Stiles (along with Kaitlin Olson) performed in the taping of the unaired pilot episode of Drew Carey's Green Screen Show, which involved improv games similar to Whose Line? games played in front of a massive green screen. Animation was later added to the improv footage.

Stiles returned as performer and executive producer for The CW's revival of Whose Line Is It Anyway? in the summer of 2013.

=== Other television and film work ===
Stiles appeared in the 1991 film Hot Shots! as Mailman Farnham and its 1993 sequel, Hot Shots! Part Deux, as marine Rabinowitz. He portrayed recurring character Dr. Herb Melnick on Two and a Half Men from 2004 until the show's end in 2015. He made short guest appearances on Parker Lewis Can't Lose, Murphy Brown, Mad About You, Mad TV, and Dharma & Greg. In July 2008, he was a guest star on Reno 911! as Sergeant Clift, an acting coach.

During the 1994 Major League Baseball strike, Stiles appeared in several commercials for Nike, hanging out in an empty ballpark, doing things such as playing the organ and attempting to do the wave alone. The commercials ended with the line: "Play ball. Please."

In 2005, Stiles appeared in the mockumentary Conker: Celebrity Squirrel produced for the promotion of the Xbox video game Conker: Live & Reloaded. This role led to gamers voting to induct him into the 2015 class of the DK Vine Hall of Fame.

== Philanthropy ==
Stiles has been a frequent fundraiser for children with burn injuries, raising over $500,000 for the Burned Children Recovery Center since 2009 and helping the foundation to recover from the Great Recession.

== Personal life ==
In 1981, Stiles met Patricia McDonald at Punchlines, where she was a waitress. They married in 1988 and have three children together.

When not working, he lives at his home on Lake Samish, outside Bellingham, Washington, where he opened the Upfront Theatre, a small theatre dedicated to live improv comedy.

== Filmography ==
=== Film ===
Film
Year	Title	Role	Notes
1985	Rainbow War		Short film
1991	Hot Shots!	Dominic "Mailman" Farnham	
1991	Public Enemy #2	Sidewalk Santa	
1993	Hot Shots! Part Deux	Rabinowitz	
1997	Courting Courtney	Chad Gross	
2003	Nobody Knows Anything!	Harold	Uncredited
2003	The Devil Made Me Do It	The Devil	Short film
2006	The Extra	Clyde	Short film
2009	Astro Boy	Mr. Mustachio / Burning Robot	Voice
2011	Spooky Buddies	Hoot	Voice; Direct-to-video
2012	Treasure Buddies	Slither	Voice; Direct-to-video

=== Television ===
Television
Year	Title	Role	Notes
1985	The Beachcombers	Leo aka Tall Suit	Season 14, episode 6: "Halibut Stu"
1986	The Hitchhiker	Maker	Also known as Deadly Nightmares in the United Kingdom; Le Voyageur in France; Uncredited; Season 3, episode 7: "O.D. Feelin'"
1988	110 Lombard		TV movie
1989–1999	Whose Line Is It Anyway?	Himself	UK series, 92 episodes
1990	It's Garry Shandling's Show	Kenny Tuchman / Bob #2	Season 4, episode 13: "Chester Gets a Show"
1991	Who's the Boss?	Bobo the Clown	Season 7, episode 20: "Party Politics"
1991	Life As We Know It!		TV movie
1991-1992	Parker Lewis Can't Lose	Weather Guy / Clerk / Sweepstakes Guy	3 episodes Uncredited - 2 episodes
1992	Say What?	Actor	TV movie
1993-1994	Mad About You	Boss / Video Vogue Manager	2 episodes
1993-1994	The John Larroquette Show	CIA Agent Kinkaid / Mac / Dave	3 episodes
1994	Weird Science	Dale Griffin	Season 2, episode 13: "Unplugged"
1994	L.A.X. 2194		TV pilot
1995–2004	The Drew Carey Show	Lewis Kiniski	Main role; 231 episodes Director - Season 5, episode 23: "Kate vs. Speedy"
1996	Saturday Night Special	—N/a	Creative consultant
1997	Murphy Brown	Acolyte Monk #2	Season 9, episode 19: "Desperate Times"
1998–2006; 2013–present	Whose Line Is It Anyway?	Himself	US series, 335 episodes Executive producer; 294 episodes
1999	ABC TGIF	Lewis Kiniski	Segment: "Drew Clues 2"
1999	Norm		Uncredited; Season 2, episode 8: "Gambling Man"
2000	The Cartoon Cartoon Show	Vivian	Voice; Episode: "Foe Paws"
2000	Buzz Lightyear of Star Command	Professor Spyro Lepton / Von Madman	Voice; Episode 37: "Eye of the Tempest"
2001	Hollywood Squares	Himself / Panelist	10 episodes
2001	Improv All Stars	Himself	TV special
2001	Dharma & Greg	Abraham Lincoln	Uncredited; Season 4, episode 10: "Dutch Treat"
2002	Rugrats	Ralph	Voice; Season 8, episode 4: "Bow Wow Wedding Vows"
2004–2015	Two and a Half Men	Dr. Herb Melnick	Recurring role; 30 episodes, Seasons 2, 4–10, 12
2008	Reno 911!	Acting coach	Season 5, episode 15: "Undercover Acting Coach"
2009	Memory Lanes	Ryan Murray	TV movie Writer; Producer
2009	Bless This Mess	Paul	TV movie
2011	Working Class	Dr. Edwin Gould DDS	Episode 2: "Dental Claims"
2011	Drew Carey's Improv-A-Ganza	Himself	Recurring performer, 34 episodes Producer; 7 episodes
2012	Are You There, Chelsea?	Jerry	Episode 9: "Fired"
2013	Bellingham T'Nite	—N/a	TV short Writer; Director; Executive producer
2019	American Housewife	Bill Doty	Season 4, episode 3: "Bigger Kids, Bigger Problems"
2020	Young Sheldon	Dr. Bowers	Season 3, episode 20: "A Baby Tooth and the Egyptian God of Knowledge"
2023	Ted Lasso	Bruce (voice)	Season 3, episode 10: "International Break"

=== Commercials ===
Commercials
Year	Title	Role	Notes
1991	Chrysler	Miming Pitchman	New Yorker Fifth Avenue, in comparison to the Cadillac DeVille
1993	Kellogg's	Himself	All-Bran
1994	Nike	Organ Player	Pleading for the end of the 94/95 MLB strike
1998	KFC	"Famous Actor"	New Hot 'N' Spicy Chicken
1998	Kwik Save	Customer	Kwik Save Hotline
2001	Kinko's	"Kenny"	Various
2004	Progressive Automotive Insurance	Himself	Various
2005	Pizza Hut	Himself	Various
2007	Playskool	Professional	Various
2011	Zaxby's	Himself	Birthday cake milkshake
