= Whose Line Is It Anyway? (American TV series) season 15 =

Whose Line Is It Anyway?
- Season 15
- Starring: Aisha Tyler; Ryan Stiles; Colin Mochrie; Wayne Brady
- No. of episodes: 12

Release
- Original network: The CW
- Original release: June 17 – September 23, 2019

Season chronology
- ← Previous; Season 14 Next → Season 16

The fifteenth season of the American television series Whose Line Is It Anyway? premiered on The CW on June 17, 2019, and concluded on September 23, 2019.

== Cast ==
=== Main ===
- Aisha Tyler
- Ryan Stiles
- Colin Mochrie
- Wayne Brady

=== Recurring ===
- Jonathan Mangum (three episodes)
- Brad Sherwood (two episodes)
- Greg Proops (two episodes)
- Jeff Davis (two episodes)
- Chip Esten (one episode)
- Gary Anthony Williams (one episode)
- Heather Anne Campbell (one episode)

Chip Esten, following two appearances as a special guest in seasons 13 and 14, returned as a recurring fourth performer for the first time since season eight.

== Episodes ==
The "winner(s)" of each episode – as chosen by host Aisha Tyler – are highlighted in italics. The winner(s) perform a sketch during the credit roll, just like in the original British series.

No. overall	No. in season	Performers	Special guest	Original release date	Prod. code	U.S. viewers (millions)
328	1	Wayne Brady, Greg Proops, Colin Mochrie, Ryan Stiles	Chris Hardwick	June 17, 2019	713	1.05
Games performed: Questions with Hats, Moving People (with audience members), Song Styles, Scenes from a Hat, Helping Hands
329	2	Wayne Brady, Jeff Davis, Colin Mochrie, Ryan Stiles	Tinashe	June 24, 2019	709	0.90
Games performed: Weird Newscasters, Song Styles, Dubbing, World's Worst, Living Scenery, Props
330	3	Wayne Brady, Jonathan Mangum, Colin Mochrie, Ryan Stiles	none	July 1, 2019	720	0.87
Games performed: Hollywood Director, Sound Effects (with audience members), Moving People (with audience members), Scenes from a Hat, Greatest Hits
331	4	Wayne Brady, Chip Esten, Colin Mochrie, Ryan Stiles	Elizabeth Gillies	July 8, 2019	715	0.93
Games performed: Weird Newscasters, Duet, Dubbing, Scenes from a Hat, Living Scenery, Hoedown
332	5	Wayne Brady, Brad Sherwood, Colin Mochrie, Ryan Stiles	none	July 15, 2019	708	0.91
Games performed: Questions with Hats, Award Show, World’s Worst, If You Know What I Mean, Sideways Scene, Greatest Hits
333	6	Wayne Brady, Gary Anthony Williams, Colin Mochrie, Ryan Stiles	Adam Rippon	July 22, 2019	712	0.85
Games performed: Dating App, Mixed Messages, Song Styles, World’s Worst, Living Scenery, Scenes from a Hat
334	7	Wayne Brady, Heather Anne Campbell, Colin Mochrie, Ryan Stiles	none	July 29, 2019	605	0.94
Games performed: Let’s Make a Date, Newsflash, Whose Line, Scenes from a Hat, Greatest Hits
335	8	Wayne Brady, Jonathan Mangum, Colin Mochrie, Ryan Stiles	Chris Jackson	August 5, 2019	717	0.94
Games performed: Weird Newscasters, Film Dub, Duet (with an audience member), Scenes from a Hat, Helping Hands
336	9	Wayne Brady, Jeff Davis, Colin Mochrie, Ryan Stiles	none	August 19, 2019	701	0.94
Games performed: Hollywood Director, Doo Wop, Secret, Scenes from a Hat, Greatest Hits
337	10	Wayne Brady, Greg Proops, Colin Mochrie, Ryan Stiles	Adrienne Houghton	August 26, 2019	714	0.80
Games performed: Weird Newscasters, Song Styles, Living Scenery, Scenes from a Hat, Greatest Hits
338	11	Wayne Brady, Brad Sherwood, Colin Mochrie, Ryan Stiles	none	September 9, 2019	607	0.93
Games performed: Questions with Hats, Props, Doo Wop, Sound Effects (with audience members), Scenes from a Hat, Greatest Hits
339	12	Wayne Brady, Jonathan Mangum, Colin Mochrie, Ryan Stiles	none	September 23, 2019	703	0.67
Games performed: Questions with Hats, Sound Effects (with audience members), Party Quirks, Scenes from a Hat, Greatest Hits
