= Whose Line Is It Anyway? (American TV series) season 4 =

Whose Line Is It Anyway?
- Season 4
- Starring: Drew Carey; Ryan Stiles; Colin Mochrie; Wayne Brady
- No. of episodes: 31

Release
- Original network: ABC
- Original release: September 6, 2001 – April 11, 2002

Season chronology
- ← Previous; Season 3 Next → Season 5

The fourth season of the American television series Whose Line Is It Anyway? premiered on ABC on September 6, 2001, and concluded on April 11, 2002.

== Cast ==
=== Main ===
- Drew Carey
- Ryan Stiles
- Colin Mochrie
- Wayne Brady

=== Recurring ===
- Kathy Greenwood (eight episodes)
- Brad Sherwood (eight episodes)
- Greg Proops (six episodes)
- Chip Esten (six episodes)
- Jeff Davis (two episodes)
- Whoopi Goldberg (one episode)

== Episodes ==
The "winner(s)" of each episode – as chosen by host Drew Carey – are highlighted in italics. The winner would take his or her seat and call a sketch for Drew to perform (often with the help of the rest).

No. overall	No. in season	Performers	Original release date	Prod. code	U.S. viewers
99	1	Wayne Brady, Jeff Davis, Colin Mochrie, Ryan Stiles	September 6, 2001	401	N/A
Games performed: Remote Control, Let's Make a Date, Sound Effects (with audience members), Doo-Wop, Props
100	2	Wayne Brady, Kathy Greenwood, Colin Mochrie, Ryan Stiles	September 6, 2001	405	N/A
Games performed: Living Scenery, Song Styles, Two-Line Vocabulary, Infomercial, Scenes from a Hat, Hoedown
101	3	Wayne Brady, Chip Esten, Colin Mochrie, Ryan Stiles	September 20, 2001	324	N/A
Games performed: Weird Newscasters, Narrate, Duet, Infomercial, Hoedown, Three-Headed Broadway Star
102	4	Wayne Brady, Kathy Greenwood, Colin Mochrie, Ryan Stiles	September 20, 2001	420	N/A
Games performed: Questions Only, Sound Effects (with audience members), Scenes from a Hat, Greatest Hits, Irish Drinking Song
103	5	Wayne Brady, Chip Esten, Colin Mochrie, Ryan Stiles	September 27, 2001	317	N/A
Games performed: Let's Make a Date, Duet, Scene To Rap, Party Quirks, Doo-Wop, Props
104	6	Wayne Brady, Kathy Greenwood, Colin Mochrie, Ryan Stiles	October 3, 2001	413	N/A
Games performed: Weird Newscasters, News Flash, Party Quirks, Show-Stopping Number, World's Worst
105	7	Brad Sherwood, Wayne Brady, Colin Mochrie, Ryan Stiles	October 4, 2001	315	N/A
Games performed: Let's Make a Date, Title Sequence, Scenes from a Hat, Party Quirks, Three-Headed Broadway Star, Hoedown
106	8	Wayne Brady, Kathy Greenwood, Colin Mochrie, Ryan Stiles	October 4, 2001	414	N/A
Games performed: Hollywood Director, Living Scenery, Three-Headed Broadway Star, Helping Hands, Props
107	9	Wayne Brady, Chip Esten, Colin Mochrie, Ryan Stiles	October 10, 2001	318	N/A
Games performed: Hollywood Director, Duet, Song Titles, Scenes from a Hat, Hoedown
108	10	Brad Sherwood, Wayne Brady, Colin Mochrie, Ryan Stiles	October 17, 2001	419	N/A
Games performed: Press Conference, If You Know What I Mean, Show-Stopping Number, Dubbing with an Audience Member, Scenes from a Hat, Hoedown
109	11	Greg Proops, Wayne Brady, Colin Mochrie, Ryan Stiles	October 18, 2001	422	N/A
Games performed: Let's Make a Date, Newsflash, Whose Line, Weird Newscasters, Irish Drinking Song
110	12	Wayne Brady, Kathy Greenwood, Colin Mochrie, Ryan Stiles	October 25, 2001	337	N/A
Games performed: Weird Newscasters, Song Styles, Newsflash, Greatest Hits, Hoedown
111	13	Greg Proops, Wayne Brady, Colin Mochrie, Ryan Stiles	November 7, 2001	418	N/A
Games performed: Press Conference, Hats, Multiple Personalities, Greatest Hits, World's Worst
112	14	Wayne Brady, Whoopi Goldberg, Colin Mochrie, Ryan Stiles	November 14, 2001	507	6.7 rating
Games performed: Hollywood Director, Song Styles, Dubbing, Two Line Vocabulary, Scenes from a Hat, Foreign Film Dub
113	15	Brad Sherwood, Wayne Brady, Colin Mochrie, Ryan Stiles	November 21, 2001	503	N/A
Games performed: Questionable Impressions, Duet, Film Dub, Sound Effects (with audience members), Foreign Film Dub. Special guests: Lassie and Sid Caesar
114	16	Wayne Brady, Jeff Davis, Colin Mochrie, Ryan Stiles	November 22, 2001	417	N/A
Games performed: Questions Only, Infomercial, Two-Line Vocabulary, Greatest Hits, World's Worst
115	17	Brad Sherwood, Wayne Brady, Colin Mochrie, Ryan Stiles	November 28, 2001	412	N/A
Games performed: Weird Newscasters, Two-Line Vocabulary, Quick Change, Scenes from a Hat, Irish Drinking Song
116	18	Wayne Brady, Chip Esten, Colin Mochrie, Ryan Stiles	December 5, 2001	421	N/A
Games performed: Weird Newscasters, Title Sequence, Scenes from a Hat, Improbable Mission, Irish Drinking Song, Props
117	19	Wayne Brady, Chip Esten, Colin Mochrie, Ryan Stiles	December 12, 2001	411	N/A
Games performed: Let's Make a Date, Motown Group, Song Titles, Scenes from a Hat, Hoedown
118	20	Brad Sherwood, Wayne Brady, Colin Mochrie, Ryan Stiles	December 13, 2001	415	N/A
Games performed: Hollywood Director, Infomercial, Party Quirks, Title Sequence, Helping Hands
119	21	Wayne Brady, Kathy Greenwood, Colin Mochrie, Ryan Stiles	December 19, 2001	409	N/A
Games performed: Meet The Family, Song Styles, Weird Newscasters, Greatest Hits, Foreign Film Dub
120	22	Wayne Brady, Kathy Greenwood, Colin Mochrie, Ryan Stiles	January 24, 2002	423	N/A
Games performed: Questions Only, Hollywood Director, Song Styles, Number of Words, Helping Hands, Props
121	23	Greg Proops, Wayne Brady, Colin Mochrie, Ryan Stiles	January 24, 2002	416	N/A
Games performed: Superheroes, Multiple Personalities, Scenes from a Hat, Greatest Hits, Sportscasters
122	24	Brad Sherwood, Wayne Brady, Colin Mochrie, Ryan Stiles	January 31, 2002	508	N/A
Games performed: Award Show, Duet, Scenes from a Hat, Living Scenery, Props. Special guest: Hugh Hefner
123	25	Wayne Brady, Chip Esten, Colin Mochrie, Ryan Stiles	February 7, 2002	403	N/A
Games performed: Superheroes, Sound Effects (with audience members), Newsflash, Scenes from a Hat, Hoedown
124	26	Greg Proops, Wayne Brady, Colin Mochrie, Ryan Stiles	February 12, 2002	404	N/A
Games performed: Weird Newcasters, Hats, Greatest Hits, Film Dub, Show-Stopping Number, World's Worst
125	27	Brad Sherwood, Wayne Brady, Colin Mochrie, Ryan Stiles	February 12, 2002	432	N/A
Games performed: Let's Make a Date, If You Know What I Mean, Duet, Title Sequence, Scenes from a Hat, Hoedown
126	28	Brad Sherwood, Wayne Brady, Colin Mochrie, Ryan Stiles	March 7, 2002	431	N/A
Games performed: Weird Newscasters, Scenes from a Hat, Two-Line Vocabulary, Greatest Hits, Foreign Film Dub
127	29	Wayne Brady, Kathy Greenwood, Colin Mochrie, Ryan Stiles	March 14, 2002	402	5.0 rating
Games performed: Hollywood Director, Song Styles, News Flash, Living Scenery, Scenes from a Hat, World's Worst
128	30	Greg Proops, Wayne Brady, Colin Mochrie, Ryan Stiles	March 28, 2002	429	3.8 rating
Games performed: Weird Newscasters, Whose Line, Action Replay, Scenes from a Hat, Hoedown
129	31	Greg Proops, Wayne Brady, Colin Mochrie, Ryan Stiles	April 11, 2002	427	N/A
Games performed: Let's Make a Date, Narrate, Film Dub, Greatest Hits, Props
