= Whose Line Is It Anyway? (American TV series) season 12 =

Whose Line Is It Anyway?
- Season 12
- Starring: Aisha Tyler; Ryan Stiles; Colin Mochrie; Wayne Brady
- No. of episodes: 20

Release
- Original network: The CW
- Original release: May 23 – September 28, 2016

Season chronology
- ← Previous; Season 11 Next → Season 13

The twelfth season of the American television series Whose Line Is It Anyway? premiered on The CW on May 23, 2016, and concluded on September 28, 2016.

== Cast ==
=== Main ===
- Aisha Tyler
- Ryan Stiles
- Colin Mochrie
- Wayne Brady (absent from episodes 11 and 20)

=== Recurring ===
- Jeff Davis (seven episodes)
- Jonathan Mangum (five episodes)
- Brad Sherwood (four episodes)
- Gary Anthony Williams (three episodes)
- Keegan-Michael Key (one episode)
- Greg Proops (one episode)

== Episodes ==
The "winner(s)" of each episode – as chosen by host Aisha Tyler – are highlighted in italics. The winner(s) perform a sketch during the credit roll, just like in the original British series.

No. overall	No. in season	Performers	Special guest	Original release date	Prod. code	U.S. viewers (millions)
276	1	Wayne Brady, Gary Anthony Williams, Colin Mochrie, Ryan Stiles	Alfonso Ribeiro	May 23, 2016	319	1.29
Games Performed: Questions with Hats, Duet, Dubbing, Scenes from a Hat, Living Scenery, Doo-Wop
277	2	Wayne Brady, Keegan-Michael Key, Colin Mochrie, Ryan Stiles	none	May 23, 2016	311	1.47
Games Performed: Weird Newscasters, Scenes from a Hat, Infomercial, Irish Drinking Song, Helping Hands, Doo-Wop
278	3	Wayne Brady, Jeff Davis, Colin Mochrie, Ryan Stiles	Karla Souza	June 6, 2016	324	1.25
Games Performed: Lets Make a Date, Duet, Scenes from a Hat, Living Scenery, Hoedown
279	4	Wayne Brady, Gary Anthony Williams, Colin Mochrie, Ryan Stiles	Yvette Nicole Brown	June 13, 2016	320	0.98
Games Performed: Hollywood Director, Duet, Film Dub, Scenes from a Hat, Helping Hands
280	5	Wayne Brady, Jonathan Mangum, Colin Mochrie, Ryan Stiles	Kaitlin Doubleday	June 20, 2016	316	1.05
Games Performed: Let's Make a Date, Duet, Dubbing, Scenes from a Hat, Helping Hands
281	6	Wayne Brady, Jeff Davis, Colin Mochrie, Ryan Stiles	Lolo Jones	July 13, 2016	305	1.23
Games Performed: Hollywood Director, Duet, Dubbing, World's Worst, Living Scenery, Hoedown
282	7	Wayne Brady, Jonathan Mangum, Colin Mochrie, Ryan Stiles	none	July 20, 2016	326	1.12
Games Performed: Hollywood Director, Scenes from a Hat, Newsflash, Props, Greatest Hits
283	8	Wayne Brady, Jeff Davis, Colin Mochrie, Ryan Stiles	Joey Fatone	July 26, 2016	408	1.05
Games Performed: Hollywood Director, Duet (with an audience member), Dubbing, Scenes from a Hat, Helping Hands
284	9	Wayne Brady, Greg Proops, Colin Mochrie, Ryan Stiles	Tamera Mowry	July 26, 2016	413	1.06
Games Performed: Scenes from a Hat, Song Styles, Themed Restaurant, Props, Helping Hands
285	10	Wayne Brady, Jeff Davis, Colin Mochrie, Ryan Stiles	none	July 27, 2016	328	1.30
Games Performed: Hollywood Director, Props, Secret, Scenes from a Hat, Greatest Hits
286	11	Brad Sherwood, Jeff Davis, Colin Mochrie, Ryan Stiles	Misty May-Treanor	August 2, 2016	404	1.12
Games Performed: Questions with Hats, Duet, Moving People (with audience members), Scenes from a Hat, Greatest Hits
287	12	Wayne Brady, Brad Sherwood, Colin Mochrie, Ryan Stiles	Lyndie Greenwood	August 2, 2016	405	1.12
Games Performed: Hollywood Director, Duet, Film Dub, Dubbing, Living Scenery, Scenes from a Hat
288	13	Wayne Brady, Gary Anthony Williams, Colin Mochrie, Ryan Stiles	Chris Jericho	August 3, 2016	402	1.31
Games Performed: Weird Newscasters, World's Worst, Duet, Scenes from a Hat, Living Scenery, Doo-Wop
289	14	Wayne Brady, Jeff Davis, Colin Mochrie, Ryan Stiles	Rachel Bloom	August 10, 2016	419	1.13
Games Performed: Hollywood Director, Scenes from a Hat, Duet, Props, Helping Hands
290	15	Wayne Brady, Jonathan Mangum, Colin Mochrie, Ryan Stiles	Lea Thompson	August 24, 2016	410	1.28
Games Performed: Weird Newscasters, World's Worst, Duet, Scenes from a Hat, Helping Hands
291	16	Wayne Brady, Brad Sherwood, Colin Mochrie, Ryan Stiles	Katie Cassidy	August 31, 2016	403	1.34
Games Performed: Let's Make a Date, Duet, Infomercial, Scenes from a Hat, Helping Hands
292	17	Wayne Brady, Jonathan Mangum, Colin Mochrie, Ryan Stiles	Brett Dier	September 7, 2016	409	1.31
Games Performed: Party Quirks, Duet, Dubbing, Scenes from a Hat, Living Scenery, Hoedown
293	18	Wayne Brady, Gary Anthony Williams, Colin Mochrie, Ryan Stiles	Emily Bett Rickards	September 14, 2016	416	1.11
Games Performed: Weird Newscasters, Duet, Living Scenery, Props, Scenes from a Hat
294	19	Wayne Brady, Jonathan Mangum, Colin Mochrie, Ryan Stiles	none	September 21, 2016	412	1.13
Games Performed: Questions with Hats, Newsflash, Doo-Wop, Sound Effects (With Audience Members), Props, Greatest Hits
295	20	Brad Sherwood, Jeff Davis, Colin Mochrie, Ryan Stiles	Cheryl Hines	September 28, 2016	406	1.17
Games Performed: Let's Make a Date, Doo-Wop, Duet, Scenes from a Hat, Helping Hands
