= Whose Line Is It Anyway? (American TV series) season 5 =

Whose Line Is It Anyway?
- Season 5
- Starring: Drew Carey; Ryan Stiles; Colin Mochrie; Wayne Brady
- No. of episodes: 34

Release
- Original network: ABC
- Original release: September 9, 2002 – September 5, 2003

Season chronology
- ← Previous; Season 4 Next → Season 6

The fifth season of the American television series Whose Line Is It Anyway? premiered on ABC on September 9, 2002, and concluded on September 5, 2003.

== Cast ==
=== Main ===
- Drew Carey
- Ryan Stiles
- Colin Mochrie
- Wayne Brady

=== Recurring ===
- Greg Proops (ten episodes)
- Brad Sherwood (nine episodes)
- Kathy Greenwood (five episodes)
- Chip Esten (five episodes)
- Kathy Griffin (four episodes)
- Jeff Davis (two episodes)
- Whoopi Goldberg (one episode)

== Episodes ==
The "winner(s)" of each episode – as chosen by host Drew Carey – are highlighted in italics. The winner would take his or her seat and call a sketch for Drew to perform (often with the help of the rest).

No. overall	No. in season	Performers	Special guest(s)	Original release date	Prod. code	U.S. viewers
130	1	Wayne Brady, Whoopi Goldberg, Colin Mochrie, Ryan Stiles	none	September 9, 2002	511	4.6 rating
Games performed: Questions Only, Two Line Vocabulary, Props, Living Scenery, Helping Hands, Three-Headed Broadway Star
131	2	Wayne Brady, Kathy Griffin, Colin Mochrie, Ryan Stiles	Katie Harman	September 16, 2002	509	3.8 rating
Games performed: Hollywood Director, Song Styles, Scenes from a Hat, Living Scenery, Props
132	3	Brad Sherwood, Wayne Brady, Colin Mochrie, Ryan Stiles	none	September 23, 2002	406	3.6 rating
Games performed: Award Show, Party Quirks, Scenes from a Hat, Bartender, Props
133	4	Brad Sherwood, Wayne Brady, Colin Mochrie, Ryan Stiles	Florence Henderson	September 30, 2002	512	3.5 rating
Games performed: Change Letter, Duet, If You Know What I Mean, Dubbing, Helping Hands
134	5	Greg Proops, Wayne Brady, Colin Mochrie, Ryan Stiles	none	October 7, 2002	425	3.4 rating
Games performed: Superheroes, Song Styles, Multiple Personalities, Funeral, Scenes from a Hat, Irish Drinking Song, Props
135	6	Wayne Brady, Kathy Greenwood, Colin Mochrie, Ryan Stiles	none	October 21, 2002	433	2.8 rating
Games performed: Questions Only, Newsflash, Song Styles, Infomercial, Scenes from a Hat, Hoedown
136	7	Greg Proops, Wayne Brady, Colin Mochrie, Ryan Stiles	none	October 28, 2002	501	3.2 rating
Games performed: Make a Monster, Scenes from a Hat, Weird Newscasters, Hats/Dating Service Video, Helping Hands
137	8	Brad Sherwood, Wayne Brady, Colin Mochrie, Ryan Stiles	Joanie Laurer	November 15, 2002	506	3.5 rating
Games performed: Scene to Music, Dubbing, Change Letter, Party Quirks, Irish Drinking Song, Living Scenery
138	9	Wayne Brady, Chip Esten, Colin Mochrie, Ryan Stiles	none	November 29, 2002	515	N/A
Games performed: Superheroes, Scenes from a Hat, Stand Sit Lie, Party Quirks, Show-Stopping Number, Helping Hands
139	10	Greg Proops, Wayne Brady, Colin Mochrie, Ryan Stiles	none	December 6, 2002	504	N/A
Games performed: Let's Make a Date, Scene to Rap, Sound Effects (with audience members), Scenes from a Hat, World's Worst
140	11	Brad Sherwood, Wayne Brady, Colin Mochrie, Ryan Stiles	none	December 20, 2002	517	4.0 rating
Games performed: Questions with Wigs, Scenes from a Hat, Party Quirks, Greatest Hits, Irish Drinking Song
141	12	Greg Proops, Wayne Brady, Colin Mochrie, Ryan Stiles	Jerry Springer	January 10, 2003	510	3.6 rating
Games performed: Hollywood Director, Newsflash, Song Styles, Daytime Talk Show, Three-Headed Broadway Star
142	13	Wayne Brady, Kathy Greenwood, Colin Mochrie, Ryan Stiles	none	January 17, 2003	408	N/A
Games performed: Questions Only, Living Scenery, Film Dub, Party Quirks, Helping Hands, Hoedown
143	14	Wayne Brady, Chip Esten, Colin Mochrie, Ryan Stiles	none	January 24, 2003	513	3.8 rating
Games performed: Let's Make a Date, Dubbing, Scenes from a Hat, Greatest Hits, Props
144	15	Wayne Brady, Kathy Griffin, Colin Mochrie, Ryan Stiles	none	April 3, 2003	514	N/A
Games performed: Questions Only, Weird Newscasters, Irish Drinking Song, Scenes from a Hat, World's Worst
145	16	Brad Sherwood, Wayne Brady, Colin Mochrie, Ryan Stiles	none	April 10, 2003	518	N/A
Games performed: Backwards Scene, Duet, Weird Newscasters, Boogie Woogie Sisters, Scenes from a Hat, Hoedown
146	17	Greg Proops, Wayne Brady, Colin Mochrie, Ryan Stiles	Richard Simmons	June 20, 2003	521	N/A
Games performed: Multiple Personalities, Newsflash, Song Styles, Living Scenery, Moving People
147	18	Brad Sherwood, Wayne Brady, Colin Mochrie, Ryan Stiles	none	June 20, 2003	609	N/A
Games performed: Press Conference, Infomercial, All in One Voice, Change Letter, Scenes from a Hat, If You Know What I Mean
148	19	Wayne Brady, Kathy Griffin, Colin Mochrie, Ryan Stiles	David Hasselhoff	June 27, 2003	610	N/A
Games performed: Newsflash, Song Styles, Two Line Vocabulary, Dubbing, Three-Headed Broadway Star
149	20	Greg Proops, Wayne Brady, Colin Mochrie, Ryan Stiles	none	June 27, 2003	603	N/A
Games performed: Weird Newscasters, Scenes from a Hat, Film Dub, Party Quirks, Hats/Dating Service Video, Irish Drinking Song
150	21	Greg Proops, Wayne Brady, Colin Mochrie, Ryan Stiles	Jayne Trcka	July 11, 2003	611	3.0 rating
Games performed: Let's Make a Date, Song Styles, Scenes from a Hat, Party Quirks, Sportscasters
151	22	Wayne Brady, Chip Esten, Colin Mochrie, Ryan Stiles	none	July 11, 2003	607	2.8 rating
Games performed: Hollywood Director, Sound Effects (with audience members), Newsflash, Bartender, Hoedown
152	23	Wayne Brady, Kathy Greenwood, Colin Mochrie, Ryan Stiles	none	July 18, 2003	519	N/A
Games performed: Number of Words, Infomercial, Song Styles, Scenes from a Hat, Newsflash, World's Worst
153	24	Brad Sherwood, Wayne Brady, Colin Mochrie, Ryan Stiles	none	July 18, 2003	316	N/A
Games performed: Superheroes, Sound Effects (with audience members), Title Sequence, If You Know What I Mean, Film Dub, Scenes from a Hat, Hoedown
154	25	Wayne Brady, Chip Esten, Colin Mochrie, Ryan Stiles	Veena and Neena Bidasha (bellydancers)	July 25, 2003	502	N/A
Games performed: Superheroes, Duet, Scenes from a Hat, Living Scenery, Themed Restaurant.
155	26	Wayne Brady, Jeff Davis, Colin Mochrie, Ryan Stiles	none	July 25, 2003	516	N/A
Games performed: Let's Make a Date, Newsflash, Scenes from a Hat, Greatest Hits, Hoedown
156	27	Brad Sherwood, Wayne Brady, Colin Mochrie, Ryan Stiles	none	August 1, 2003	601	N/A
Games performed: Hollywood Director, If You Know What I Mean, Whose Line, Greatest Hits, Helping Hands
157	28	Greg Proops, Wayne Brady, Colin Mochrie, Ryan Stiles	Undarma Darihu (contortionist)	August 8, 2003	608	N/A
Games performed: Scene to Music, Scenes from a Hat, Song Styles, Change Letter, Living Scenery, Hats/Dating Service Video, Sportscasters
158	29	Wayne Brady, Kathy Griffin, Colin Mochrie, Ryan Stiles	none	August 8, 2003	606	N/A
Games performed: Press Conference, Sound Effects (with audience members), Irish Drinking Song, Party Quirks, Helping Hands, Themed Restaurant
159	30	Greg Proops, Wayne Brady, Colin Mochrie, Ryan Stiles	Jerry Springer	August 15, 2003	612	N/A
Games performed: Make a Monster, Dubbing, Scenes from a Hat, Greatest Hits, World's Worst
160	31	Brad Sherwood, Wayne Brady, Colin Mochrie, Ryan Stiles	none	August 22, 2003	520	N/A
Games performed: Hollywood Director, Two Line Vocabulary, Press Conference, Improbable Mission, Irish Drinking Song
161	32	Wayne Brady, Jeff Davis, Colin Mochrie, Ryan Stiles	none	August 29, 2003	426	N/A
Games performed: Weird Newscasters, Duet, Scenes from a Hat, Greatest Hits, Themed Restaurant
162	33	Greg Proops, Wayne Brady, Colin Mochrie, Ryan Stiles	none	September 5, 2003	605	N/A
Games performed: Let's Make a Date, Hats/Dating Service Video, Fashion Models, Scenes from a Hat, Newsflash, Hoedown
163	34	Wayne Brady, Chip Esten, Colin Mochrie, Ryan Stiles	none	September 5, 2003	604	N/A
Games performed: Hollywood Director, Improbable Mission, Scenes from a Hat, Greatest Hits, Props
