= Whose Line Is It Anyway? (American TV series) season 2 =

Whose Line Is It Anyway?
- Season 2
- Starring: Drew Carey; Ryan Stiles; Colin Mochrie; Wayne Brady
- No. of episodes: 39

Release
- Original network: ABC
- Original release: September 16, 1999 – May 18, 2000

Season chronology
- ← Previous; Season 1 Next → Season 3

The second season of the American television series Whose Line Is It Anyway? premiered on ABC on September 16, 1999, and concluded on May 18, 2000.

== Cast ==
=== Main ===
- Drew Carey
- Ryan Stiles
- Colin Mochrie
- Wayne Brady

=== Recurring ===
- Brad Sherwood (eleven episodes)
- Greg Proops (ten episodes)
- Chip Esten (eight episodes)
- Denny Siegel (four episodes)
- Josie Lawrence (two episodes)
- Kathy Greenwood (two episodes)
- Karen Maruyama (two episodes)

== Episodes ==
The "winner(s)" of each episode – as chosen by host Drew Carey – are highlighted in italics. The winner would take his or her seat and call a sketch for Drew to perform (often with the help of the rest).

No. overall	No. in season	Performers	Original release date	Prod. code	U.S. viewers
21	1	Wayne Brady, Chip Esten, Colin Mochrie, Ryan Stiles	September 16, 1999	209	N/A
Games performed: Let's Make a Date, Three-Headed Broadway Star, Props, Stand Sit Lie Down, Greatest Hits, Hoedown
22	2	Brad Sherwood, Wayne Brady, Colin Mochrie, Ryan Stiles	September 23, 1999	205	N/A
Games performed: Weird Newscasters, Duet, Newsflash, Party Quirks, Scenes from a Hat, Hoedown
23	3	Greg Proops, Wayne Brady, Colin Mochrie, Ryan Stiles	September 30, 1999	206	N/A
Games performed: Weird Newscasters, African Chant, Scenes from a Hat, Change Emotion, Greatest Hits, Hoedown
24	4	Greg Proops, Wayne Brady, Colin Mochrie, Ryan Stiles	October 7, 1999	201	5.3 rating
Games performed: Let's Make a Date, Film Dub, Three-Headed Broadway Star, Film, Theater & TV Styles, Greatest Hits, World's Worst
25	5	Wayne Brady, Chip Esten, Colin Mochrie, Ryan Stiles	October 7, 1999	220	4.8 rating
Games performed: Weird Newscasters, Duet, Scenes from a Hat, Whose Line?, Hoedown, Questions Only
26	6	Wayne Brady, Denny Siegel, Colin Mochrie, Ryan Stiles	October 14, 1999	203	4.8 rating
Games performed: Weird Newscasters, Song Styles, Scenes from a Hat, Newsflash, Three-Headed Broadway Star, Hoedown
27	7	Brad Sherwood, Wayne Brady, Colin Mochrie, Ryan Stiles	October 21, 1999	202	5.8 rating
Games performed: Let's Make a Date, Superheroes, Ballad of, If You Know What I Mean, Greatest Hits, 90 Second Alphabet
28	8	Wayne Brady, Josie Lawrence, Colin Mochrie, Ryan Stiles	October 28, 1999	212	N/A
Games performed: Let's Make a Date, Film TV and Theatre Styles, Newsflash, Weird Newscasters, Duet, Foreign Film Dub
29	9	Brad Sherwood, Wayne Brady, Colin Mochrie, Ryan Stiles	November 4, 1999	221	N/A
Games performed: Song Titles, Gangsta Rap, Scenes from a Hat, Weird Newscasters, Three-Headed Broadway Star, Hoedown
30	10	Greg Proops, Wayne Brady, Colin Mochrie, Ryan Stiles	November 4, 1999	204	N/A
Games performed: Superheroes, Song Styles, Newsflash, Questionable Impressions, Dating Service Videos, Three-Headed Broadway Star
31	11	Greg Proops, Wayne Brady, Colin Mochrie, Ryan Stiles	November 4, 1999	222	N/A
Games performed: Let's Make a Date, Film TV and Theatre Styles, Props, Party Quirks, Song Styles, World's Worst
32	12	Wayne Brady, Chip Esten, Colin Mochrie, Ryan Stiles	November 11, 1999	211	N/A
Games performed: Let's Make a Date, Duet, Props, Party Quirks, Hoedown, Three-Headed Broadway Star
33	13	Wayne Brady, Josie Lawrence, Colin Mochrie, Ryan Stiles	November 18, 1999	223	N/A
Games performed: Questions Only, Whose Line, Props, Scenes from a Hat, Greatest Hits, Hoedown
34	14	Brad Sherwood, Wayne Brady, Colin Mochrie, Ryan Stiles	November 25, 1999	213	N/A
Games performed: Superheroes, Film TV and Theatre Styles, Props, Motown Group, The Millionaire Show, Hoedown
35	15	Wayne Brady, Denny Siegel, Colin Mochrie, Ryan Stiles	December 2, 1999	207	N/A
Games performed: Let's Make a Date, Song Styles, Narrate, Weird Newscasters, Scene to Rap, Hoedown
36	16	Greg Proops, Wayne Brady, Colin Mochrie, Ryan Stiles	December 9, 1999	224	N/A
Games performed: Change of Cast, Song Styles, Props, Weird Newscasters, Moving People, Hoedown, 90 Second Alphabet
37	17	Brad Sherwood, Wayne Brady, Colin Mochrie, Ryan Stiles	December 16, 1999	208	N/A
Games performed: Weird Newscasters, Duet, Whose Line, Party Quirks, Scenes from a Hat, Hoedown
38	18	Brad Sherwood, Wayne Brady, Colin Mochrie, Ryan Stiles	January 6, 2000	225	N/A
Games performed: Superheroes, Film TV and Theatre Styles, Song Titles, Sound Effects, Telethon, Three-Headed Broadway Star
39	19	Greg Proops, Wayne Brady, Colin Mochrie, Ryan Stiles	January 13, 2000	210	N/A
Games performed: Weird Newscasters, Questionable Impressions, Scenes from a Hat, Whose Line, Three-Headed Broadway Star, Hoedown
40	20	Wayne Brady, Kathy Greenwood, Colin Mochrie, Ryan Stiles	January 20, 2000	215	N/A
Games performed: Questions Only, Sound Effects, Props, Newsflash, Greatest Hits, Foreign Film Dub
41	21	Wayne Brady, Chip Esten, Colin Mochrie, Ryan Stiles	February 3, 2000	226	N/A
Games performed: Superheroes, Film TV and Theatre Styles, Newsflash, Duet, Party Quirks, 90 Second Alphabet
42	22	Wayne Brady, Kathy Greenwood, Colin Mochrie, Ryan Stiles	February 3, 2000	227	N/A
Games performed: Weird Newscasters, Song Styles, Themed Restaurant, Narrate, Scenes from a Hat, Hoedown
43	23	Greg Proops Wayne Brady, Colin Mochrie, Ryan Stiles	February 10, 2000	216	N/A
Games performed: Weird Newscasters, African Chant, Scenes from a Hat, Scene with an Audience Member, Dating Service Videos, 90 Second Alphabet
44	24	Wayne Brady, Chip Esten, Colin Mochrie Ryan Stiles	February 17, 2000	228	N/A
Games performed: Superheroes, Title Sequence, Scenes from a Hat, Narrate, Greatest Hits, 90 Second Alphabet
45	25	Greg Proops, Wayne Brady Colin Mochrie, Ryan Stiles	February 24, 2000	229	8.1 rating
Games performed: Superheroes, Sound Effects, Song Styles, The Millionaire Show, Hoedown
46	26	Brad Sherwood, Wayne Brady, Colin Mochrie, Ryan Stiles	March 2, 2000	230	8.9 rating
Games performed: Let's Make a Date, Scene to Rap, Props, Moving People, Greatest Hits, Questions Only
47	27	Greg Proops, Wayne Brady, Colin Mochrie, Ryan Stiles	March 9, 2000	231	8.0 rating
Games performed: Weird Newscasters, Song Styles, Sound Effects, Number of Words, Party Quirks, Scene to Rap, Hoedown
48	28	Wayne Brady, Karen Maruyama, Colin Mochrie, Ryan Stiles	March 16, 2000	217	N/A
Games performed: Questions Only, Song Styles, Sound Effects, Newsflash, Scenes from a Hat, Motown Group, Foreign Film Dub
49	29	Greg Proops, Wayne Brady, Colin Mochrie Ryan Stiles	March 23, 2000	232	6.9 rating
Games performed: Let's Make a Date, Song Styles, Party Quirks, Improbable Mission, Three-Headed Broadway Star
50	30	Brad Sherwood, Wayne Brady, Colin Mochrie, Ryan Stiles	March 30, 2000	233	N/A
Games performed: Let's Make a Date, Film TV and Theatre Styles, Props, Newsflash, Greatest Hits, World's Worst
51	31	Wayne Brady, Denny Siegel, Colin Mochrie, Ryan Stiles	April 6, 2000	234	N/A
Games performed: Let's Make a Date, Sound Effects, Props, Moving People, Hoedown, Helping Hands
52	32	Wayne Brady, Karen Maruyama, Colin Mochrie, Ryan Stiles	April 20, 2000	235	N/A
Games performed: Film TV and Theatre Styles, Weird Newscasters, Song Styles, Party Quirks, The Millionaire Show, Hoedown
53	33	Wayne Brady, Chip Esten, Colin Mochrie, Ryan Stiles	April 27, 2000	214	N/A
Games performed: Weird Newscasters, Scene to Rap, Props, Newsflash, Greatest Hits, Questions Only
54	34	Brad Sherwood, Wayne Brady, Colin Mochrie, Ryan Stiles	April 27, 2000	218	N/A
Games performed: Let's Make a Date, Newsflash, Title Sequence, Whose Line, Scenes from a Hat, Hoedown
55	35	Brad Sherwood, Wayne Brady, Colin Mochrie, Ryan Stiles	May 4, 2000	236	6.7 rating
Games performed: Weird Newscasters, Film Dub, Questionable Impressions, Narrate, Greatest Hits, 90 Second Alphabet
56	36	Wayne Brady, Chip Esten, Colin Mochrie, Ryan Stiles	May 4, 2000	219	8.4 rating
Games performed: Superheroes, Let's Make a Date, Duet, Whose Line, Scenes from a Hat, Props
57	37	Brad Sherwood, Wayne Brady, Colin Mochrie, Ryan Stiles	May 11, 2000	237	N/A
Games performed: Film TV and Theatre Styles, Film Dub, Quick Change, Motown Group, If You Know What I Mean, Greatest Hits, Props
58	38	Wayne Brady, Denny Siegel, Colin Mochrie, Ryan Stiles	May 18, 2000	238	N/A
Games performed: Questions Only, Film TV and Theatre Styles, Scenes from a Hat, Old Job-New Job, Greatest Hits, Hoedown
59	39	Wayne Brady, Chip Esten, Colin Mochrie, Ryan Stiles	May 18, 2000	239	N/A
Games performed: Film TV and Theatre Styles, Duet, Song Titles, Newsflash, Hoedown, Foreign Film Dub
