= Whose Line Is It Anyway? (American TV series) season 7 =

Whose Line Is It Anyway?
- Season 7
- Starring: Drew Carey; Ryan Stiles; Colin Mochrie; Wayne Brady
- No. of episodes: 25

Release
- Original network: ABC Family
- Original release: January 17 – May 23, 2005

Season chronology
- ← Previous; Season 6 Next → Season 8

The seventh season of the American television series Whose Line Is It Anyway? premiered on ABC Family on January 17, 2005, and concluded on May 23, 2005.

== Cast ==
=== Main ===
- Drew Carey
- Ryan Stiles
- Colin Mochrie
- Wayne Brady

=== Recurring ===
- Kathy Greenwood (nine episodes)
- Chip Esten (six episodes)
- Brad Sherwood (five episodes)
- Greg Proops (four episodes)
- Jeff Davis (one episode)

== Episodes ==
The "winner(s)" of each episode – as chosen by host Drew Carey – are highlighted in italics. The winner would take his or her seat and call a sketch for Drew to perform (often with the help of the rest).

No. overall	No. in season	Performers	Original release date	Prod. code
174	1	Brad Sherwood, Wayne Brady, Colin Mochrie, Ryan Stiles	January 17, 2005	7001
Games performed: Superheroes, Film Dub, Infomercial, Party Quirks, Greatest Hits, Three-Headed Broadway Star
175	2	Wayne Brady, Kathy Greenwood, Colin Mochrie, Ryan Stiles	January 17, 2005	7002
Games performed: Let's Make a Date, Two-Line Vocabulary, Film Dub, Sound Effects (with audience members), Show-Stopping Number, Themed Restaurant
176	3	Greg Proops, Wayne Brady, Colin Mochrie, Ryan Stiles	January 24, 2005	7003
Games performed: Award Show, Press Conference, Infomercial, Sound Effects (with audience members), Irish Drinking Song, Props
177	4	Wayne Brady, Chip Esten, Colin Mochrie, Ryan Stiles	January 24, 2005	7004
Games performed: Weird Newscasters, Duet, Whose Line, Greatest Hits, Irish Drinking Song
178	5	Wayne Brady, Chip Esten, Colin Mochrie, Ryan Stiles	January 31, 2005	7005
Games performed: Song Titles, Two-Line Vocabulary, Duet, Action Replay, Greatest Hits, Doo-Wop
179	6	Wayne Brady, Kathy Greenwood, Colin Mochrie, Ryan Stiles	January 31, 2005	7006
Games performed: Let's Make a Date, Whose Line, Dead Bodies, Greatest Hits, Props
180	7	Brad Sherwood, Wayne Brady, Colin Mochrie, Ryan Stiles	February 7, 2005	7007
Games performed: Superheroes, If You Know What I Mean, All in One Voice, Film Dub, Sound Effects (with audience members), Scenes from a Hat, Props
181	8	Wayne Brady, Chip Esten, Colin Mochrie, Ryan Stiles	February 7, 2005	7008
Games performed: Let's Make a Date, Film TV and Theatre Styles, Doo-Wop, Greatest Hits, Props
182	9	Wayne Brady, Chip Esten, Colin Mochrie, Ryan Stiles	February 14, 2005	7009
Games performed: Let's Make a Date, Whose Line, Scenes from a Hat, Song Titles, Doo-Wop, Props
183	10	Greg Proops, Wayne Brady, Colin Mochrie, Ryan Stiles	February 14, 2005	7010
Games performed: Hollywood Director, Scenes from a Hat, African Chant, Sound Effects (with audience members), Fashion Models
184	11	Greg Proops, Wayne Brady, Colin Mochrie, Ryan Stiles	February 21, 2005	7011
Games performed: Superheroes, Hey You Down There, Hollywood Director, Two-Line Vocabulary, Scene To Rap, Foreign Film Dub
185	12	Wayne Brady, Kathy Greenwood, Colin Mochrie, Ryan Stiles	February 21, 2005	7012
Games performed: Let's Make a Date, Sound Effects (with audience members), Motown Group, Helping Hands, Foreign Film Dub
186	13	Wayne Brady, Kathy Greenwood, Colin Mochrie, Ryan Stiles	February 28, 2005	7013
Games performed: Hollywood Director, Three-Headed Broadway Star, Scenes from a Hat, Helping Hands, Props
187	14	Wayne Brady, Jeff Davis, Colin Mochrie, Ryan Stiles	March 7, 2005	7014
Games performed: Number of Words, Duet, Infomercial, Scenes from a Hat, Bartender, Props
188	15	Brad Sherwood, Wayne Brady, Colin Mochrie, Ryan Stiles	March 14, 2005	7015
Games performed: Questionable Impressions, Duet, Sound Effects (with audience members), Greatest Hits, Hoedown
189	16	Wayne Brady, Kathy Greenwood, Colin Mochrie, Ryan Stiles	March 21, 2005	7016
Games performed: Let's Make a Date, Really Bad Hangover, Scenes from a Hat, Film Dub, Greatest Hits, Foreign Film Dub
190	17	Wayne Brady, Kathy Greenwood, Colin Mochrie, Ryan Stiles	March 28, 2005	7017
Games performed: Hollywood Director, Dubbing, Scenes from a Hat, Greatest Hits, Foreign Film Dub
191	18	Greg Proops, Wayne Brady, Colin Mochrie, Ryan Stiles	April 4, 2005	7018
Games performed: Hollywood Director, Remote Control, Song Styles, Sound Effects (with audience members), Scenes from a Hat, Hoedown
192	19	Wayne Brady, Chip Esten, Colin Mochrie,Ryan Stiles	April 11, 2005	7019
Games performed: Hollywood Director, Newsflash, Party Quirks, Bartender, Hoedown
193	20	Brad Sherwood, Wayne Brady, Colin Mochrie, Ryan Stiles	April 18, 2005	7020
Games performed: Number of Words, Scenes from a Hat, Dubbing, Greatest Hits, Props
194	21	Wayne Brady, Chip Esten, Colin Mochrie, Ryan Stiles	April 25, 2005	7021
Games performed: Let's Make a Date, Duet, Bartender, Party Quirks, Irish Drinking Song, World's Worst
195	22	Wayne Brady, Kathy Greenwood, Colin Mochrie, Ryan Stiles	May 2, 2005	7022
Games performed: Let's Make a Date, Motown Group, Narrate, Scenes from a Hat, Hoedown
196	23	Wayne Brady, Kathy Greenwood, Colin Mochrie, Ryan Stiles	May 9, 2005	7023
Games performed: Weird Newscasters, Number of Words, Action Replay, Living Scenery, Show-Stopping Number, World's Worst
197	24	Brad Sherwood, Wayne Brady, Colin Mochrie, Ryan Stiles	May 16, 2005	7024
Games performed: Hollywood Director, Motown Group, Sound Effects (with audience members), Greatest Hits, Props
198	25	Wayne Brady, Kathy Greenwood, Colin Mochrie, Ryan Stiles	May 23, 2005	7025
Games performed: Questions Only, Sound Effects (with audience members), Weird Newscasters, Scenes from a Hat, Helping Hands
