= Whose Line Is It Anyway? (American TV series) season 11 =

Whose Line Is It Anyway?
- Season 11
- Starring: Aisha Tyler; Ryan Stiles; Colin Mochrie; Wayne Brady
- No. of episodes: 20

Release
- Original network: The CW
- Original release: April 17 – October 5, 2015

Season chronology
- ← Previous; Season 10 Next → Season 12

The eleventh season of the American television series Whose Line Is It Anyway? premiered on The CW on April 17, 2015, and concluded on October 5, 2015.

== Cast ==
=== Main cast ===
- Aisha Tyler
- Ryan Stiles
- Colin Mochrie
- Wayne Brady

=== Recurring ===
- Jeff Davis (six episodes)
- Gary Anthony Williams (three episodes)
- Keegan-Michael Key (three episodes)
- Brad Sherwood (three episodes)
- Greg Proops (two episodes)
- Heather Anne Campbell (two episodes)
- Jonathan Mangum (one episode)

== Episodes ==
The "winner(s)" of each episode – as chosen by host Aisha Tyler – are highlighted in italics. The winner(s) perform a sketch during the credit roll, just like in the original British series.

No. overall	No. in season	Performers	Special guest	Original release date	Prod. code	U.S. viewers (millions)
256	1	Wayne Brady, Gary Anthony Williams, Colin Mochrie, Ryan Stiles	Cedric the Entertainer	April 17, 2015	302	1.07
Games performed: Weird Newscasters, Questions with Hats, World's Worst, Living Scenery, Greatest Hits
257	2	Wayne Brady, Jeff Davis, Colin Mochrie, Ryan Stiles	Adelaide Kane	April 24, 2015	306	0.78
Games performed: Questions with Hats, Scenes from a Hat, Duet, Party Quirks, Helping Hands
258	3	Wayne Brady, Keegan-Michael Key, Colin Mochrie, Ryan Stiles	none	May 1, 2015	304	0.72
Games performed: Questions with Hats, Newsflash, Old Job-New Job, Scenes from a Hat, Greatest Hits
259	4	Wayne Brady, Jeff Davis, Colin Mochrie, Ryan Stiles	Jaime Camil	May 8, 2015	308	1.38
Games performed: Hollywood Director, Duet, Dubbing, Props, Living Scenery, Doo-Wop
260	5	Wayne Brady, Greg Proops, Colin Mochrie, Ryan Stiles	Scott Porter	May 15, 2015	307	1.17
Games performed: Let's Make a Date, Song Styles, Dubbing, Scenes from a Hat, Living Scenery
261	6	Wayne Brady, Jeff Davis, Colin Mochrie, Ryan Stiles	Willie Robertson	May 29, 2015	309	1.41
Games performed: Questions with Hats, Duet, Newsflash, Scenes from a Hat, Helping Hands
262	7	Wayne Brady, Brad Sherwood, Colin Mochrie, Ryan Stiles	Heather Morris	June 5, 2015	314	1.56
Games Performed: Weird Newscasters, Dubbing, Living Scenery, Scenes from a Hat, Greatest Hits
263	8	Wayne Brady, Keegan-Michael Key, Colin Mochrie, Ryan Stiles	Vernon Davis	June 12, 2015	303	1.49
Games Performed: Let's Make a Date, Song Styles, Props, Dubbing, Living Scenery
264	9	Wayne Brady, Jeff Davis, Colin Mochrie, Ryan Stiles	none	June 19, 2015	312	1.30
Games Performed: Weird Newscasters, Hoedown, Newsflash, Scenes from a Hat, Greatest Hits
265	10	Wayne Brady, Gary Anthony Williams, Colin Mochrie, Ryan Stiles	Penn & Teller	July 6, 2015	301	1.27
Games Performed: Let's Make a Date, Duet, Secret, Scenes from a Hat, Helping Hands
266	11	Wayne Brady, Brad Sherwood, Colin Mochrie, Ryan Stiles	Kathie Lee Gifford	July 13, 2015	313	1.57
Games Performed: Questions with Hats, Duet, Dead Bodies, Scenes from a Hat, Helping Hands
267	12	Wayne Brady, Jonathan Mangum, Colin Mochrie, Ryan Stiles	Randy Couture	July 20, 2015	315	1.40
Games Performed: Weird Newscasters, Duet, Living Scenery, Doo-Wop, Scenes from a Hat
268	13	Wayne Brady, Jeff Davis, Colin Mochrie, Ryan Stiles	Gina Rodriguez	August 3, 2015	321	1.39
Games Performed: Weird Newscasters, Duet, Themed Restaurant, Scenes from a Hat, Helping Hands
269	14	Wayne Brady, Gary Anthony Williams, Colin Mochrie, Ryan Stiles	none	August 10, 2015	325	1.79
Games Performed: World's Worst, Whose Line, Irish Drinking Song, Props, Doo-Wop, Greatest Hits
270	15	Wayne Brady, Heather Anne Campbell, Colin Mochrie, Ryan Stiles	Nina Agdal	August 17, 2015	317	1.46
Games Performed: World's Worst, Song Styles, Dead Bodies, Scenes from a Hat, Helping Hands
271	16	Wayne Brady, Brad Sherwood, Colin Mochrie, Ryan Stiles	none	August 24, 2015	327	1.43
Games Performed: Let's Make a Date, Props, Secret, Scenes from a Hat, Greatest Hits
272	17	Wayne Brady, Greg Proops, Colin Mochrie, Ryan Stiles	Bill Nye	August 31, 2015	310	1.74
Games Performed: Weird Newscasters, Newsflash, Song Styles, Scenes from a Hat, Helping Hands
273	18	Wayne Brady, Keegan-Michael Key, Colin Mochrie, Ryan Stiles	none	September 14, 2015	322	1.06
Games Performed: Hollywood Director, Scenes from a Hat, Whose Line, Hats/Dating Service Video, Greatest Hits
274	19	Wayne Brady, Heather Anne Campbell; Colin Mochrie, Ryan Stiles	Carson Kressley	September 28, 2015	318	1.25
Games Performed: Questions with Hats, Props, Dubbing, Scenes from a Hat, Living Scenery, Doo-Wop
275	20	Wayne Brady, Jeff Davis, Colin Mochrie, Ryan Stiles	none	October 5, 2015	323	1.22
Games Performed: Let's Make a Date, Sound Effects (with Audience Members), Film Dub, Scenes from a Hat, Greatest Hits
