= Whose Line Is It Anyway? (American TV series) season 3 =

Whose Line Is It Anyway?
- Season 3
- Starring: Drew Carey; Ryan Stiles; Colin Mochrie; Wayne Brady
- No. of episodes: 39

Release
- Original network: ABC
- Original release: October 12, 2000 – June 14, 2001

Season chronology
- ← Previous; Season 2 Next → Season 4

The third season of the American television series Whose Line Is It Anyway? premiered on ABC on October 12, 2000, and concluded on June 14, 2001.

== Cast ==
=== Main ===
- Drew Carey
- Ryan Stiles
- Colin Mochrie
- Wayne Brady

=== Recurring ===
- Greg Proops (twelve episodes)
- Kathy Greenwood (nine episodes)
- Chip Esten (eight episodes)
- Brad Sherwood (six episodes)
- Jeff Davis (three episodes)
- Robin Williams (one episode)

== Episodes ==
The "winner(s)" of each episode – as chosen by host Drew Carey – are highlighted in italics. The winner would take his or her seat and call a sketch for Drew to perform (often with the help of the rest).

A special titled "Best of Whose Line Is It Anyway?" aired on October 4, 2000, and was a clip show highlighting the series' first two seasons, hosted by Drew Carey.

No. overall	No. in season	Performers	Original release date	Prod. code	U.S. viewers
60	1	Wayne Brady, Kathy Greenwood, Colin Mochrie, Ryan Stiles	October 12, 2000	302	N/A
Games performed: Weird Newscasters, Song Styles, Scenes from a Hat, What Are You Trying To Say?, Party Quirks, Irish Drinking Song
61	2	Wayne Brady, Chip Esten, Colin Mochrie, Ryan Stiles	October 12, 2000	303	N/A
Games performed: Let's Make a Date, Scene with an Audience Member, Sound Effects (with audience members), Motown Group, Three-Headed Broadway Star
62	3	Wayne Brady, Chip Esten, Colin Mochrie, Ryan Stiles	October 19, 2000	312	N/A
Games performed: Hollywood Director, Duet, Narrate, Themed Restaurant, Greatest Hits, Three-Headed Broadway Star
63	4	Greg Proops, Wayne Brady, Colin Mochrie, Ryan Stiles	October 19, 2000	305	N/A
Games performed: Weird Newscasters, Sound Effects (with audience members), Song Styles, Newsflash, Irish Drinking Song, World's Worst
64	5	Greg Proops, Wayne Brady, Colin Mochrie, Ryan Stiles	October 26, 2000	319	N/A
Games performed: Survival Show, Scenes from a Hat, Reunion, Greatest Hits, Props
65	6	Brad Sherwood, Wayne Brady, Colin Mochrie, Ryan Stiles	November 2, 2000	306	N/A
Games performed: Let's Make a Date, Duet, Infomercial, Scenes Cut From A Movie, Irish Drinking Song, Foreign Film Dub
66	7	Wayne Brady, Jeff Davis, Colin Mochrie, Ryan Stiles	November 2, 2000	304	N/A
Games performed: Weird Newscasters, Scenes from a Hat, Party Quirks, Greatest Hits, Hoedown
67	8	Wayne Brady, Kathy Greenwood, Colin Mochrie, Ryan Stiles	November 9, 2000	320	7.3 rating
Games performed: Film TV and Theatre Styles, Song Styles, Narrate, Newsflash, Motown Group, Hoedown
68	9	Wayne Brady, Robin Williams, Colin Mochrie, Ryan Stiles	November 16, 2000	313	N/A
Games performed: Hollywood Director, Duet, Party Quirks, Scenes from a Hat, Props
69	10	Wayne Brady, Chip Esten, Colin Mochrie, Ryan Stiles	November 23, 2000	341	N/A
Games performed: Superheroes, Duet, Scenes from a Hat, Whose Line, Greatest Hits, Three-Headed Broadway Star
70	11	Greg Proops, Wayne Brady, Colin Mochrie, Ryan Stiles	November 23, 2000	340	N/A
Games performed: Let's Make a Date, Multiple Personalities, Hats, Props, Dead Bodies, Scene To Rap, Stand Sit Bend
71	12	Wayne Brady, Chip Esten, Colin Mochrie, Ryan Stiles	November 30, 2000	309	N/A
Games performed: Superheroes, Duet, Good Cop/Bad Cop, Sound Effects (with audience members), Irish Drinking Song, Props
72	13	Greg Proops, Wayne Brady, Colin Mochrie, Ryan Stiles	November 30, 2000	342	N/A
Games performed: Let's Make a Date, Film Dub, Film TV and Theatre Styles, Themed Restaurant, Greatest Hits, Props
73	14	Greg Proops, Wayne Brady, Colin Mochrie, Ryan Stiles	January 4, 2001	301	N/A
Games performed: Superheroes, Film TV and Theatre Styles, Hats, Greatest Hits, World's Worst
74	15	Wayne Brady, Jeff Davis, Colin Mochrie, Ryan Stiles	January 11, 2001	321	N/A
Games performed: Let's Make a Date, Whose Line, Props, Sound Effects (with audience members), Duet, Hoedown
75	16	Wayne Brady, Chip Esten, Colin Mochrie, Ryan Stiles	January 25, 2001	322	N/A
Games performed: Film TV and Theatre Styles, Duet, Song Titles, Party Quirks, Greatest Hits, Hoedown
76	17	Wayne Brady, Kathy Greenwood, Colin Mochrie, Ryan Stiles	February 1, 2001	323	N/A
Games performed: Questions Only, Sound Effects, Three-Headed Broadway Star, Scenes Cut From A Movie, The Millionaire Show, Hoedown
77	18	Brad Sherwood, Wayne Brady, Colin Mochrie, Ryan Stiles	February 21, 2001	327	N/A
Games performed: Weird Newscasters, Award Show, If You Know What I Mean, Greatest Hits, Props
78	19	Greg Proops, Wayne Brady, Colin Mochrie, Ryan Stiles	February 21, 2001	326	N/A
Games performed: Hollywood Director, Song Styles, Sound Effects (with audience members), Hats, Three-Headed Broadway Star
79	20	Wayne Brady, Jeff Davis, Colin Mochrie, Ryan Stiles	February 22, 2001	325	N/A
Games performed: Questionable Impressions, Film TV and Theatre Styles, Irish Drinking Song, Duet, Newsflash, Hoedown, Foreign Film Dub
80	21	Greg Proops, Wayne Brady, Colin Mochrie, Ryan Stiles	March 15, 2001	307	N/A
Games performed: Weird Newscasters, Two-Line Vocabulary, Party Quirks, Greatest Hits, Props
81	22	Wayne Brady, Chip Esten, Colin Mochrie, Ryan Stiles	March 15, 2001	328	N/A
Games performed: Superheroes, Sound Effects (with audience members), Three-Headed Broadway Star, Whose Line, Irish Drinking Song, Helping Hands
82	23	Greg Proops, Wayne Brady, Colin Mochrie, Ryan Stiles	March 22, 2001	333	N/A
Games performed: Let's Make a Date, Narrate, Song Styles, The Millionaire Show, Hoedown
83	24	Brad Sherwood, Wayne Brady, Colin Mochrie, Ryan Stiles	March 22, 2001	310	N/A
Games performed: Superheroes, Two-Line Vocabulary, Scenes from a Hat, Greatest Hits, Three-Headed Broadway Star
84	25	Brad Sherwood, Wayne Brady, Colin Mochrie, Ryan Stiles	March 29, 2001	329	4.3 rating
Games performed: Weird Newscasters, Doo-Wop, Narrate, Greatest Hits, Props
85	26	Greg Proops, Wayne Brady, Colin Mochrie, Ryan Stiles	April 5, 2001	335	N/A
Games performed: Sound Effects, Song Styles, Scenes from a Hat, Improbable Mission, Three-Headed Broadway Star, Props
86	27	Wayne Brady, Kathy Greenwood, Colin Mochrie, Ryan Stiles	April 12, 2001	311	N/A
Games performed: Questions Only, African Chant, The Millionaire Show, Scenes from a Hat, Hoedown
87	28	Wayne Brady, Kathy Greenwood, Colin Mochrie, Ryan Stiles	April 19, 2001	330	N/A
Games performed: Let's Make a Date, Scene with an Audience Member, Props, Greatest Hits, Foreign Film Dub
88	29	Wayne Brady, Kathy Greenwood, Colin Mochrie, Ryan Stiles	April 26, 2001	336	N/A
Games performed: Film TV and Theatre Styles, Song Styles, The Millionaire Show, Motown Group, Hoedown
89	30	Brad Sherwood, Wayne Brady, Colin Mochrie, Ryan Stiles	April 27, 2001	334	N/A
Games performed: Hollywood Director, Duet, Sound Effects (with audience members), Three-Headed Broadway Star, Quick Change
90	31	Greg Proops, Wayne Brady, Colin Mochrie, Ryan Stiles	April 27, 2001	332	N/A
Games performed: Superheroes, Song Styles, Improbable Mission, Scenes from a Hat, Hoedown
91	32	Greg Proops, Wayne Brady, Colin Mochrie, Ryan Stiles	May 3, 2001	331	N/A
Games performed: Superheroes, Film TV and Theatre Styles, Wedding, Greatest Hits, Three-Headed Broadway Star
92	33	Wayne Brady, Chip Esten, Colin Mochrie, Ryan Stiles	May 4, 2001	338	N/A
Games performed: Superheroes, Duet, Scenes Cut From A Movie, Greatest Hits, Hoedown
93	34	Wayne Brady, Kathy Greenwood, Colin Mochrie, Ryan Stiles	May 4, 2001	343	N/A
Games performed: Let's Make a Date, Film TV and Theatre Styles, Motown Group, Party Quirks, Three-Headed Broadway Star, 90 Second Alphabet
94	35	Wayne Brady, Kathy Greenwood, Colin Mochrie, Ryan Stiles	May 10, 2001	339	N/A
Games performed: Hollywood Director, Infomercial, Action Replay, Greatest Hits, Props
95	36	Wayne Brady, Chip Esten, Colin Mochrie, Ryan Stiles	May 17, 2001	344	N/A
Games performed: Weird Newscasters, Sound Effects, Song Titles, Film TV and Theatre Styles, Motown Group, Hoedown
96	37	Greg Proops, Wayne Brady, Colin Mochrie, Ryan Stiles	May 18, 2001	410	N/A
Games performed: Number of Words, Song Styles, Show-Stopping Number, Scenes from a Hat, Hoedown. The 100th Episode Special (though only the 96th episode aired).
97	38	Wayne Brady, Kathy Greenwood, Colin Mochrie, Ryan Stiles	June 14, 2001	308	N/A
Games performed: Weird Newscasters, Song Styles, Action Replay, Party Quirks, Hoedown
98	39	Brad Sherwood, Wayne Brady, Colin Mochrie, Ryan Stiles	June 14, 2001	407	N/A
Games performed: Let's Make a Date, Two-Line Vocabulary, Greatest Hits, World's Worst
