= Whose Line Is It Anyway? (American TV series) season 16 =

Whose Line Is It Anyway?
- Season 16
- Starring: Aisha Tyler; Ryan Stiles; Colin Mochrie; Wayne Brady
- No. of episodes: 20

Release
- Original network: The CW
- Original release: March 30 – November 16, 2020

Season chronology
- ← Previous; Season 15 Next → Season 17

The sixteenth season of the American television series Whose Line Is It Anyway? premiered on The CW on March 30, 2020, and concluded on November 16, 2020.

== Cast ==
=== Main ===
- Aisha Tyler
- Ryan Stiles
- Colin Mochrie
- Wayne Brady

=== Recurring ===
- Gary Anthony Williams (five episodes)
- Jeff Davis (five episodes)
- Greg Proops (three episodes)
- Chip Esten (three episodes)
- Jonathan Mangum (three episodes)
- Brad Sherwood (one episode)

== Episodes ==
The "winner(s)" of each episode – as chosen by host Aisha Tyler – are highlighted in italics. The winner(s) perform a sketch during the credit roll, just like in the original British series.

No. overall	No. in season	Performers	Special guest	Original release date	Prod. code	U.S. viewers (millions)
340	1	Wayne Brady, Jeff Davis, Colin Mochrie, Ryan Stiles	Amber Riley	March 30, 2020	710	0.87
Games performed: Hollywood Director, Mixed Messages, Song Styles, Scenes from a Hat, Helping Hands
341	2	Wayne Brady, Gary Anthony Williams, Colin Mochrie, Ryan Stiles	Jeanine Mason	April 6, 2020	711	0.93
Games performed: Questions with Hats, Song Styles, Themed Restaurant, Moving People (with audience members), Helping Hands
342	3	Wayne Brady, Greg Proops, Colin Mochrie, Ryan Stiles	none	April 13, 2020	807	0.91
Games Performed: Sound Effects (with audience members), Scenes from a Hat, Film Dub, Party Quirks, Greatest Hits
343	4	Wayne Brady, Chip Esten, Colin Mochrie, Ryan Stiles	none	April 20, 2020	803	0.99
Games Performed: Questions with Hats, Scenes from a Hat, Mixed Messages, Props, Greatest Hits
344	5	Wayne Brady, Jonathan Mangum; Colin Mochrie, Ryan Stiles	Chris Lee	April 27, 2020	718	1.02
Games Performed: Dating App (Let's Make A Date), Duet, World's Worst, Dubbing, Living Scenery
345	6	Wayne Brady, Jeff Davis, Colin Mochrie, Ryan Stiles	Candice Patton	May 4, 2020	705	0.89
Games Performed: Questions with Hats, Sound Effects (with audience members), Duet, Film Dub, Scenes from a Hat, Greatest Hits
346	7	Wayne Brady, Gary Anthony Williams, Colin Mochrie, Ryan Stiles	Cedric the Entertainer	May 11, 2020	707	1.05
Games Performed: Scenes from a Hat, Duet, Props, Newsflash, Greatest Hits
347	8	Wayne Brady, Jonathan Mangum, Colin Mochrie, Ryan Stiles	none	June 22, 2020	704	1.07
Games Performed: Let’s Make a Date, Film Dub, Irish Drinking Song, Secret, Scenes from a Hat, Greatest Hits
348	9	Wayne Brady, Greg Proops, Colin Mochrie, Ryan Stiles	none	June 29, 2020	719	1.04
Games Performed: Hollywood Director, Scenes from a Hat, Whose Line, Props, Greatest Hits
349	10	Wayne Brady, Chip Esten, Colin Mochrie, Ryan Stiles	Ricki Lake	July 6, 2020	716	1.05
Games Performed: Dating App (Let’s Make a Date), Duet, Whose Line, Themed Restaurant, Helping Hands
350	11	Wayne Brady, Gary Anthony Williams, Colin Mochrie, Ryan Stiles	none	July 13, 2020	706	0.92
Games Performed: Let’s Make a Date, Props, Whose Line, Scenes from a Hat, Greatest Hits
351	12	Wayne Brady, Gary Anthony Williams, Colin Mochrie, Ryan Stiles	none	July 20, 2020	801	0.93
Games Performed: Hollywood Director, Sound Effects (with audience members), Newsflash, Scenes from a Hat, Greatest Hits
352	13	Wayne Brady, Greg Proops, Colin Mochrie, Ryan Stiles	none	July 27, 2020	802	0.96
Games Performed: Dating App (Let’s Make a Date), Doo-Wop, Mixed Messages, Scenes from a Hat, Greatest Hits
353	14	Wayne Brady, Gary Anthony Williams, Colin Mochrie, Ryan Stiles	Adam Rippon	August 24, 2020	804	1.00
Games Performed: Weird Newscasters, Scenes from a Hat, Dubbing, Infomercial, Props
354	15	Wayne Brady, Brad Sherwood, Colin Mochrie, Ryan Stiles	none	August 31, 2020	702	0.89
Games Performed: Questions with Hats, Film Dub, Props, Sound Effects (with audience members), Scenes from a Hat, Greatest Hits
355	16	Wayne Brady, Jeff Davis, Colin Mochrie, Ryan Stiles	none	October 5, 2020	805	0.79
Games Performed: Dating App (Let’s Make a Date), Doo-Wop, Forward Rewind, Scenes from a Hat, Greatest Hits
356	17	Wayne Brady, Jeff Davis, Colin Mochrie, Ryan Stiles	none	October 12, 2020	808	0.92
Games Performed: World's Worst, Doo-Wop, Newsflash, Scenes from a Hat, Greatest Hits
357	18	Wayne Brady, Chip Esten, Colin Mochrie, Ryan Stiles	none	October 19, 2020	809	0.83
Games Performed: Hollywood Director, Doo-Wop, Film Dub, Hoedown, Scenes from a Hat, Greatest Hits
358	19	Wayne Brady, Jeff Davis, Colin Mochrie, Ryan Stiles	none	October 26, 2020	810	1.05
Games Performed: Questions with Hats, Sound Effects (with audience members), Newsflash, Scenes from a Hat, Greatest Hits
359	20	Wayne Brady, Jonathan Mangum, Colin Mochrie, Ryan Stiles	none	November 16, 2020	806	0.90
Games Performed: Questions with Hats, Mixed Messages, Scenes from a Hat, Newsflash, Props, Greatest Hits
