= Whose Line Is It Anyway? (American TV series) season 10 =

Whose Line Is It Anyway?
- Season 10
- Starring: Aisha Tyler; Ryan Stiles; Colin Mochrie; Wayne Brady
- No. of episodes: 24

Release
- Original network: The CW
- Original release: March 21 – November 21, 2014

Season chronology
- ← Previous; Season 9 Next → Season 11

The tenth season of the American television series Whose Line Is It Anyway? premiered on The CW on March 21, 2014, and concluded on November 21, 2014.

== Cast ==
=== Main ===
- Aisha Tyler
- Ryan Stiles (absent from episodes 4 and 7)
- Colin Mochrie
- Wayne Brady

=== Recurring ===
- Jeff Davis (six episodes)
- Gary Anthony Williams (five episodes)
- Greg Proops (four episodes)
- Heather Anne Campbell (three episodes)
- Keegan-Michael Key (two episodes)
- Nyima Funk (two episodes)
- Jonathan Mangum (two episodes)
- Brad Sherwood (two episodes)

== Episodes ==
The "winner(s)" of each episode – as chosen by host Aisha Tyler – are highlighted in italics. The winner(s) perform a sketch during the credit roll, just like in the original British series.

No. overall	No. in season	Performers	Special guest	Original release date	Prod. code	U.S. viewers (millions)
232	1	Wayne Brady, Greg Proops, Colin Mochrie, Ryan Stiles	Kat Graham	March 21, 2014	203	1.74
Games performed: Scenes from a Hat, Song Styles, Infomercial, Party Quirks, Living Scenery
233	2	Wayne Brady, Keegan-Michael Key, Colin Mochrie, Ryan Stiles	Tara Lipinski	March 21, 2014	202	1.74
Games performed: Hollywood Director, Song Styles, Dubbing, Props, Living Scenery, Scenes from a Hat
234	3	Wayne Brady, Nyima Funk, Colin Mochrie, Ryan Stiles	Verne Troyer	March 28, 2014	204	1.83
Games performed: Let's Make a Date, Sound Effects (with audience members), Song Styles, Props, Living Scenery
235	4	Wayne Brady, Jeff Davis, Colin Mochrie, Greg Proops	Darren Criss	April 4, 2014	210	1.50
Games performed: Hollywood Director, Props, Dubbing, Scenes from a Hat, Greatest Hits.
236	5	Wayne Brady, Greg Proops, Colin Mochrie, Ryan Stiles	Michael Weatherly	April 11, 2014	206	1.36
Games performed: Hollywood Director, Newsflash, Irish Drinking Song, Scenes from a Hat, Helping Hands
237	6	Wayne Brady, Gary Anthony Williams, Colin Mochrie, Ryan Stiles	Byambajav Ulambayar	April 18, 2014	201	1.41
Games performed: Scenes from a Hat, Sound Effects (with audience members), Duet, Props, Living Scenery
238	7	Wayne Brady, Jeff Davis, Colin Mochrie, Greg Proops	Nolan Gould	April 25, 2014	205	1.69
Games performed: Weird Newscasters, Sound Effects (with audience members), Living Scenery, Hoedown, Scenes from a Hat.
239	8	Wayne Brady, Gary Anthony Williams, Colin Mochrie, Ryan Stiles	Mircea Monroe	May 2, 2014	207	1.25
Games performed: Weird Newscasters, Dubbing, World's Worst, Secret, Irish Drinking Song, Helping Hands
240	9	Wayne Brady, Keegan-Michael Key, Colin Mochrie, Ryan Stiles	none	May 9, 2014	209	1.45
Games performed: Let's Make a Date, Forward Rewind, Film Dub, Scenes from a Hat, Greatest Hits
241	10	Wayne Brady, Nyima Funk, Colin Mochrie, Ryan Stiles	Jack Osbourne	May 16, 2014	208	1.78
Games performed: Hollywood Director, Dubbing, Secret, Scenes from a Hat, Helping Hands
242	11	Wayne Brady, Jonathan Mangum, Colin Mochrie, Ryan Stiles	Rob Gronkowski	June 2, 2014	211	1.66
Games performed: Let's Make a Date, Duet, What's in the Bag, Props, Helping Hands
243	12	Wayne Brady, Jeff Davis, Colin Mochrie, Ryan Stiles	Robbie Amell	June 9, 2014	218	1.88
Games performed: Questions, Duet, Dubbing, Scenes from a Hat, Helping Hands
244	13	Wayne Brady, Brad Sherwood, Colin Mochrie, Ryan Stiles	Misha Collins	June 16, 2014	212	1.73
Games performed: Let's Make a Date, Duet, Scenes from a Hat, Hoedown, Living Scenery
245	14	Wayne Brady, Jeff Davis, Colin Mochrie, Ryan Stiles	Sheryl Underwood	June 23, 2014	219	1.62
Games performed: Hollywood Director, Props, Living Scenery, Scenes from a Hat, Greatest Hits
246	15	Wayne Brady, Gary Anthony Williams, Colin Mochrie, Ryan Stiles	Mel B.	July 14, 2014	214	1.52
Games performed: Scenes from a Hat, Duet, Dubbing, Props, Living Scenery, Doo-Wop
247	16	Wayne Brady, Brad Sherwood, Colin Mochrie, Ryan Stiles	Kunal Nayyar	July 21, 2014	220	1.79
Games performed: Weird Newscasters, Props, Duet, Scenes from a Hat, Helping Hands
248	17	Wayne Brady, Jeff Davis, Colin Mochrie, Ryan Stiles	none	August 4, 2014	222	1.73
Games performed: Weird Newscasters, Irish Drinking Song, Party Quirks, World's Worst, Greatest Hits
249	18	Wayne Brady, Heather Anne Campbell, Colin Mochrie, Ryan Stiles	Padma Lakshmi	August 11, 2014	216	1.87
Games performed: Hollywood Director, Song Styles, Secret, Props, Helping Hands
250	19	Wayne Brady, Jeff Davis, Colin Mochrie, Ryan Stiles	none	August 18, 2014	224	1.68
Games performed: Let's Make a Date, Newsflash, Award Show, Hoedown, Scenes from a Hat
251	20	Wayne Brady, Gary Anthony Williams, Colin Mochrie, Ryan Stiles	Matt Barnes	October 3, 2014	213	1.30
Games performed: Weird Newscasters, Duet, Secret, Scenes from a Hat, Helping Hands
252	21	Wayne Brady, Gary Anthony Williams, Colin Mochrie, Ryan Stiles	none	October 10, 2014	221	1.51
Games performed: Let's Make a Date, Film Dub, What's In The Bag, World’s Worst, Greatest Hits
253	22	Wayne Brady, Heather Anne Campbell, Colin Mochrie, Ryan Stiles	Brian Shaw	November 7, 2014	217	1.42
Games performed: Weird Newscasters, Song Styles, Film Dub, Scenes from a Hat, Living Scenery, Doo-Wop
254	23	Wayne Brady, Jonathan Mangum, Colin Mochrie, Ryan Stiles	Wendi McLendon-Covey	November 14, 2014	215	1.66
Games performed: Hollywood Director, Dubbing, Film Dub, Secret, Living Scenery, Scenes from a Hat
255	24	Wayne Brady, Heather Anne Campbell, Colin Mochrie, Ryan Stiles	none	November 21, 2014	223	1.68
Games performed: Scenes from a Hat, Whose Line, Forward Rewind, Newsflash, Greatest Hits
