= Whose Line Is It Anyway? (American TV series) season 1 =

Whose Line Is It Anyway?
- Season 1
- Starring: Drew Carey; Ryan Stiles; Colin Mochrie
- No. of episodes: 20

Release
- Original network: ABC
- Original release: August 5, 1998 – March 24, 1999

Season chronology
- Next → Season 2

The first season of the American television series Whose Line Is It Anyway? premiered on ABC on August 5, 1998, and concluded on March 24, 1999.

== Cast ==
=== Main ===
- Drew Carey
- Ryan Stiles
- Colin Mochrie

=== Recurring ===
- Wayne Brady (sixteen episodes)
- Brad Sherwood (eight episodes)
- Greg Proops (seven episodes)
- Denny Siegel (five episodes)
- Karen Maruyama (one episode)
- Kathy Kinney (one episode)
- Ian Gomez (one episode)
- Stephen Colbert (one episode)

== Episodes ==
The "winner(s)" of each episode – as chosen by host Drew Carey – are highlighted in italics. The winner would take his or her seat and call a sketch for Drew to perform (often with the help of the rest).

No. overall	No. in season	Performers	Original release date	Prod. code	U.S. viewers
1	1	Greg Proops, Wayne Brady, Colin Mochrie, Ryan Stiles	August 5, 1998	103	7.6 rating, 7.4 million
Games performed: Let's Make a Date, Sound Effects, Hats/Dating Service Video, Greatest Hits, Party Quirks, Foreign Film Dub
2	2	Brad Sherwood, Wayne Brady, Colin Mochrie, Ryan Stiles	August 12, 1998	104	7.9 rating, 7.7 million
Games performed: Let's Make a Date, Film, Theater & TV Styles, Duet, Weird Newscasters, Moving People, Scene to Rap, 90-Second Alphabet
3	3	Greg Proops, Wayne Brady, Colin Mochrie, Ryan Stiles	August 19, 1998	106	8.1 rating, 7.9 million
Games performed: Let's Make a Date, Scene to Rap, Hats/Dating Service Video, Weird Newscasters, Greatest Hits, Newsflash
4	4	Brad Sherwood, Wayne Brady, Colin Mochrie, Ryan Stiles	August 26, 1998	101	7.9 rating
Games performed: Weird Newscasters, Duet, Animals, Props, Moving People, Party Quirks, Scene to Rap, Foreign Film Dub
5	5	Brad Sherwood, Karen Maruyama, Colin Mochrie, Ryan Stiles	September 2, 1998	105	7.9 rating, 7.9 million
Games performed: Let's Make a Date, Song Styles, Daytime Talk Show, Props, Film Dub, Sportscasters, Hoedown, Stand Sit Bend
6	6	Brad Sherwood, Kathy Kinney, Colin Mochrie, Ryan Stiles	September 9, 1998	102	7.5 rating
Games performed: Let's Make a Date, Sound Effects, Daytime Talk Show, Props, Helping Hands, Hoedown, 90-Second Alphabet
7	7	Greg Proops, Wayne Brady, Colin Mochrie, Ryan Stiles	September 23, 1998	107	N/A
Games performed: Daytime Talk Show, Song Styles, Moving People, Props, Party Quirks, Hoedown, Foreign Film Dub
8	8	Wayne Brady, Denny Siegel, Colin Mochrie, Ryan Stiles	October 17, 1998	111	N/A
Games performed: Let's Make a Date, Song Styles, Props, Party Quirks, Greatest Hits, Helping Hands
9	9	Greg Proops, Wayne Brady, Colin Mochrie, Ryan Stiles	December 16, 1998	108	8.5 rating
Games performed: Superheroes, Song Styles, Weird Newscasters, Greatest Hits, Party Quirks, Questions Only
10	10	Wayne Brady, Denny Siegel, Colin Mochrie, Ryan Stiles	January 6, 1999	117	9.8 rating
Games performed: Questions Only, Song Styles, Newsflash, Sound Effects, Weird Newscasters, Scene to Rap, Hoedown
11	11	Greg Proops, Wayne Brady, Colin Mochrie, Ryan Stiles	January 13, 1999	113	9.3 rating
Games performed: Let's Make a Date, Film, Theater & TV Styles, Hats/Dating Service Video, Weird Newscasters, Greatest Hits, Helping Hands
12	12	Brad Sherwood, Wayne Brady, Colin Mochrie, Ryan Stiles	January 20, 1999	119	8.5 rating
Games performed: Let's Make a Date, Duet, Newsflash, Film, Theater & TV Styles, Telethon, Hoedown
13	13	Wayne Brady, Denny Siegel, Colin Mochrie, Ryan Stiles	January 27, 1999	120	9.3 rating
Games performed: Questions Only, Song Styles, Dead Bodies, Sound Effects, Weird Newscasters, Hoedown, Stand Sit & Bend
14	14	Brad Sherwood, Ian Gomez, Colin Mochrie, Ryan Stiles	February 3, 1999	114	8.8 rating
Games performed: Let's Make a Date, Moving People, Weird Newscasters, Greatest Hits, Party Quirks, Helping Hands
15	15	Greg Proops, Wayne Brady, Colin Mochrie, Ryan Stiles	February 10, 1999	118	9.3 rating
Games performed: Weird Newscasters, Song Styles, Hats/Dating Service Video, Sportscasters, Film Dub, Greatest Hits, Hoedown
16	16	Brad Sherwood, Wayne Brady, Colin Mochrie, Ryan Stiles	February 17, 1999	121	9.3 rating
Games performed: Superheroes, Weird Newscasters, Scenes from a Hat, Props, Greatest Hits, Helping Hands
17	17	Wayne Brady, Stephen Colbert, Colin Mochrie, Ryan Stiles	February 24, 1999	116	7.7 rating
Games performed: Weird Newscasters, Scene to Rap, Moving People, Props, Greatest Hits, Party Quirks, Hoedown
18	18	Wayne Brady, Denny Siegel, Colin Mochrie, Ryan Stiles	March 10, 1999	115	N/A
Games performed: Questions Only, Song Styles, Newsflash, Hey, You Down There!, Party Quirks, Scene to Rap, Helping Hands
19	19	Brad Sherwood, Wayne Brady, Colin Mochrie, Ryan Stiles	March 10, 1999	110	8.0 rating
Games performed: Weird Newscasters, Duet, Sound Effects, Props, Narrate, Telethon, Stand Sit Bend
20	20	Greg Proops, Denny Siegel, Colin Mochrie, Ryan Stiles	March 24, 1999	109	N/A
Games performed: Weird Newscasters, Multiple Personalities, Fashion Models, World's Worst, Props, Party Quirks, Hoedown, 90-Second Alphabet
