= Whose Line Is It Anyway? (American TV series) season 6 =

Whose Line Is It Anyway?
- Season 6
- Starring: Drew Carey; Ryan Stiles; Colin Mochrie; Wayne Brady
- No. of episodes: 10

Release
- Original network: ABC
- Original release: June 24 – September 4, 2004

Season chronology
- ← Previous; Season 5 Next → Season 7

The sixth season of the American television series Whose Line Is It Anyway? premiered on ABC on June 24, 2004, and concluded on September 4, 2004.

== Cast ==
=== Main ===
- Drew Carey
- Ryan Stiles
- Colin Mochrie
- Wayne Brady

=== Recurring ===
- Chip Esten (five episodes)
- Greg Proops (three episodes)
- Brad Sherwood (one episode)
- Denny Siegel (one episode)

== Episodes ==
The "winner(s)" of each episode – as chosen by host Drew Carey – are highlighted in italics. The winner would take his or her seat and call a sketch for Drew to perform (often with the help of the rest).

No. overall	No. in season	Performers	Original release date	Prod. code	U.S. viewers (millions)
164	1	Wayne Brady, Chip Esten, Colin Mochrie, Ryan Stiles	June 24, 2004	602	4.96
Games performed: Hollywood Director, Doo-Wop, Scenes from a Hat, Greatest Hits, Helping Hands
165	2	Brad Sherwood, Wayne Brady, Colin Mochrie, Ryan Stiles	July 1, 2004	424	4.88
Games performed: Hollywood Director, Weird Newscasters, Improbable Mission, Boogie Woogie Sisters, Props
166	3	Wayne Brady, Chip Esten, Colin Mochrie, Ryan Stiles	July 8, 2004	348	4.64
Games performed: Weird Newscasters, Sound Effects, Title Sequence, Scene with an Audience Member, Greatest Hits, Questions Only
167	4	Greg Proops, Wayne Brady, Colin Mochrie, Ryan Stiles	July 29, 2004	347	N/A
Games performed: Let's Make a Date, Scene to Rap, Sound Effects, Film Dub, Greatest Hits, Hoedown
168	5	Greg Proops, Wayne Brady, Colin Mochrie, Ryan Stiles	July 31, 2004	345	N/A
Games performed: Superheroes, Questionable Impressions, Props, Song Styles, Moving People, Hats, Hoedown
169	6	Wayne Brady, Chip Esten, Colin Mochrie, Ryan Stiles	August 7, 2004	505	4.01
Valentine's Day-themed show; Games performed: Press Conference, Sound Effects (with audience members), Duet, Living Scenery, Irish Drinking Song; Special guests: Loyola Marymount University cheerleaders
170	7	Greg Proops, Wayne Brady, Colin Mochrie, Ryan Stiles	August 14, 2004	430	2.94
Games performed: Let's Make a Date, Newsflash, Funeral, Party Quirks, African Chant, Props
171	8	Wayne Brady, Chip Esten, Colin Mochrie, Ryan Stiles	August 21, 2004	314	2.56
Games performed: Film TV and Theatre Styles, Title Sequence, Action Replay, Greatest Hits, 90 Second Alphabet
172	9	Wayne Brady, Denny Siegel, Colin Mochrie, Ryan Stiles	August 28, 2004	346	2.63
Games performed: Questions Only, Narrate, Film TV and Theatre Styles, Party Quirks, Greatest Hits, Hoedown
173	10	Wayne Brady, Chip Esten, Colin Mochrie, Ryan Stiles	September 4, 2004	428	3.40
Games performed: Superheroes, Duet, Weird Newscasters, Newsflash, Irish Drinking Song, Themed Restaurant
