= Whose Line Is It Anyway? (American TV series) season 14 =

Whose Line Is It Anyway?
- Season 14
- Starring: Aisha Tyler; Ryan Stiles; Colin Mochrie; Wayne Brady
- No. of episodes: 17

Release
- Original network: The CW
- Original release: June 4 – October 1, 2018

Season chronology
- ← Previous; Season 13 Next → Season 15

The fourteenth season of the American television series Whose Line Is It Anyway? premiered on The CW on June 4, 2018, and concluded on October 1, 2018.

== Cast ==
=== Main ===
- Aisha Tyler
- Ryan Stiles
- Colin Mochrie
- Wayne Brady

=== Recurring ===
- Jeff Davis (five episodes)
- Greg Proops (four episodes)
- Gary Anthony Williams (three episodes)
- Jonathan Mangum (two episodes)
- Keegan-Michael Key (one episode)
- Heather Anne Campbell (one episode)
- Brad Sherwood (one episode)

== Episodes ==
The "winner(s)" of each episode – as chosen by host Aisha Tyler – are highlighted in italics. The winner(s) perform a sketch during the credit roll, just like in the original British series.

No. overall	No. in season	Performers	Special guest	Original release date	Prod. code	U.S. viewers (millions)
311	1	Wayne Brady, Greg Proops, Colin Mochrie, Ryan Stiles	Ross Mathews	June 4, 2018	506	1.11
Games performed: Weird Newscasters, Song Styles, Themed Restaurant, Scenes from a Hat, Living Scenery
312	2	Wayne Brady, Jeff Davis, Colin Mochrie, Ryan Stiles	none	June 4, 2018	612	1.25
Games performed: World's Worst, Show-Stopping Number, Infomercial, Scenes from a Hat, Greatest Hits
313	3	Wayne Brady, Gary Anthony Williams, Colin Mochrie, Ryan Stiles	Andrea Navedo	June 11, 2018	505	0.98
Games performed: Weird Newscasters, Duet, Dubbing, Newsflash, World's Worst, Helping Hands
314	4	Wayne Brady, Jonathan Mangum, Colin Mochrie, Ryan Stiles	none	June 18, 2018	606	0.92
Games performed: Questions with Hats, Forward Rewind, Infomercial, Scenes from a Hat, Film Dub, Sideways Scene
315	5	Wayne Brady, Jeff Davis, Colin Mochrie, Ryan Stiles	Chip Esten	June 25, 2018	503	1.11
Games performed: Questions with Hats, Song Styles (with an audience member), Mixed Messages, World's Worst, Party Quirks, Hoedown
316	6	Wayne Brady, Greg Proops, Colin Mochrie, Ryan Stiles	none	July 2, 2018	602	1.09
Games performed: Hollywood Director, Props, Newsflash, Scenes from a Hat, Greatest Hits
317	7	Wayne Brady, Jonathan Mangum, Colin Mochrie, Ryan Stiles	none	July 9, 2018	611	1.11
Games performed: Let's Make a Date, Mixed Messages, Infomercial, Scenes from a Hat, Newsflash, Hoedown
318	8	Wayne Brady, Keegan-Michael Key, Colin Mochrie, Ryan Stiles	none	July 16, 2018	609	1.05
Games performed: Questions with Hats, Sound Effects (with Audience Members), Weird Newscasters, Scenes from a Hat, Helping Hands
319	9	Wayne Brady, Heather Anne Campbell, Colin Mochrie, Ryan Stiles	none	July 23, 2018	610	1.24
Games performed: Party Quirks, Newsflash, Props, Secret, Film Dub, Greatest Hits (Note: This is the 100th episode of the revival.)
320	10	Wayne Brady, Gary Anthony Williams, Colin Mochrie, Ryan Stiles	none	July 30, 2018	512	1.05
Games performed: Hollywood Director, Props, Whose Line, Scenes from a Hat, Greatest Hits
321	11	Wayne Brady, Jeff Davis, Colin Mochrie, Ryan Stiles	none	August 6, 2018	608	0.89
Games performed: Let’s Make a Date, Doo-Wop, Newsflash, Scenes from a Hat, Greatest Hits
322	12	Wayne Brady, Brad Sherwood, Colin Mochrie, Ryan Stiles	Carmen Electra	August 13, 2018	508	1.19
Games performed: Let’s Make a Date, Duet, Scenes from a Hat, Living Scenery, Hoedown
323	13	Wayne Brady, Jeff Davis, Colin Mochrie, Ryan Stiles	none	August 20, 2018	601	1.04
Games performed: Let's Make a Date, Irish Drinking Song, Sound Effects (with Audience Members), Props, Greatest Hits
324	14	Wayne Brady, Greg Proops, Colin Mochrie, Ryan Stiles	none	August 27, 2018	603	1.28
Games performed: Questions with Hats, Props, Whose Line, Scenes from a Hat, Party Quirks, Doo-Wop
325	15	Wayne Brady, Jeff Davis, Colin Mochrie, Ryan Stiles	Cornelius Smith Jr.	September 3, 2018	501	1.02
Games performed: Weird Newscasters, Duet, Living Scenery, Scenes from a Hat, Helping Hands
326	16	Wayne Brady, Gary Anthony Williams , Colin Mochrie, Ryan Stiles	none	September 24, 2018	604	0.73
Games performed: Questions with Hats, Sound Effects (With Audience Members), Film Dub, Scenes from a Hat, Greatest Hits
327	17	Wayne Brady, Greg Proops, Colin Mochrie, Ryan Stiles	Lance Bass	October 1, 2018	507	0.73
Games performed: Let's Make a Date, Song Styles (with an audience member), Mixed Messages, Scenes from a Hat, Helping Hands
