= Vs. (game show) =

American TV game show

- Genre: Quiz show
- Created by: Bradley Anderson; Mack Anderson
- Written by: Doug Armstrong; Jonathan Bourne; David Floyd
- Directed by: Paul Casey
- Presented by: Greg Proops
- Narrated by: Joe Liss
- Music by: Eban Schletter
- Country of origin: United States
- Original language: English

Production
- Executive producers: Bradley Anderson; Mack Anderson
- Production location: Hollywood, California
- Running time: 30 minutes
- Production company: First Television

Original release
- Network: Comedy Central
- Release: May 31 – September 3, 1999

Related
- Clash!

Vs. is a game show that ran in 1999 on Comedy Central. It was hosted by Greg Proops, with Joe Liss as announcer.

The game featured two three-member teams that were complete opposites (firemen/pyromaniacs). Proops would ask both teams questions about general topics as well as topics relating to the subject that divided the teams.

== Sample matchups ==
Nudists vs. Porn Stars

Vegans vs. Deli Workers

College Professors vs. Middle School Students

Astronomers vs. Astrologers

Notre Dame vs. USC

Mall Santas vs. Elvis Impersonators

Bowlers vs. Marathon Runners

Morticians vs. Clowns

Beauty Queens vs. Goth Queens

Firefighters vs. Gay Men's Chorus Members

Soccer Moms vs. Dominatrices

PETA Members vs. Hunters

Lifeguards vs. Computer Geeks

Cowboys vs. Indians (People from India)

Surf Punks vs. Teachers

Ventriloquists vs. Phone Sex Operators

Rocket Scientists vs. Body Piercers

Comedy Legends (Kip Addotta, Shelley Berman, and Fred Travalena) vs. Alternative Comedy (Patton Oswalt, Sarah Silverman, and Blaine Capatch)

Beverly Hills 90210 vs. Compton 90220

Warrant vs. Berlin

Cops vs. Hippies

Blondes vs. Brunettes

Laker Girls vs. Raiderettes

Mensa vs. Polish People

Young Republicans vs. Deadheads

Capitalists vs. Rastafarians

== Round 1 ==
A subject and two categories within it were shown to the teams. One team chose a category, and Proops read a toss-up question for which any player could buzz-in. A correct answer won $100 for the team, while a miss carried no penalty but allowed the opponents a chance to buzz-in and steal. Teams were only allowed to confer if they were attempting to steal; they could not confer on the initial buzz-in. Proops then read a question in the second category. After both questions had been asked, a new subject and pair of categories were presented and the team that gave the last correct answer made the next choice. The round ended after four subjects had been played.

== Round 2 ==
Two categories were presented, one written specifically for each team. The team in control chose one category, and Proops read a toss-up open to all players. Questions from a team's own side of the board awarded $200 for a correct answer, while those from the opposing team's side awarded $400. All incorrect answers deducted $200 and gave the opponents a chance to steal. After the question was asked, the category was taken out of play and a new one was shown in its place; the team that gave the last correct answer made the next choice.

A maximum of five categories were played per team. If one team's categories were exhausted, its side of the board remained empty for the rest of the round and Proops continued asking questions from the other team's side. The round continued until either all 10 questions had been asked or time ran out; Proops warned the team when the round was entering its final two minutes.

== Round 3 ==
For this round, the six players were split into pairs containing one person from each team. Every pair received three toss-up questions, with all answers being one of three related choices (i.e. "SUV", "S&M", or "STD"). Correct answers scored $250, while wrong answers deducted $250 and gave the opponent a chance to answer. In addition, if neither player buzzed in, both teams lost $250. After all three pairs of players had had their turns, the team in the lead won the game and kept their money; the other team received a worthless consolation prize.

== "Grand Finale" bonus round ==
The winning team was given a choice of two categories, one in a difficult or obscure field and the other tailored to the team's background. Proops read a question in the chosen category, and the team had 10 seconds to think it over before answering. A correct response awarded an additional $1,000. In the event of a miss, the losing team was given five seconds to think and could win the money with a correct answer.

== Broadcast history ==
NOTE: All times are Eastern.

| Date | Time slot |
|---|---|
| May - September 1999 | Weekdays, 12:30 p.m. & 5:00 p.m. Weeknights, 1:00 a.m. |
| June 1999 | Thursdays, 10:30 p.m. |
