= Seymour the Fractal Cat =

- Genre: Comedy/Science fiction
- Running time: 30 minutes
- Country of origin: United Kingdom
- Language: English
- Home station: BBC Radio 4
- Starring: Paul Bown; Greg Proops; John Hegley; Nisha K. Nayar; Robert Bathurst; Julie Gibbs; Brian Bowles; Simon Greenall; Peter Serafinowicz; Maria Charles
- Written by: Gary Parker
- Original release: April 1996
- No. of series: 1
- No. of episodes: 5
- Audio format: Stereophonic sound
- Opening theme: "I Almost Had a Weakness" by Elvis Costello

Seymour the Fractal Cat is a science fiction comedy serial featuring Paul Bown, John Hegley and Greg Proops. It was written by Gary Parker, and first broadcast on BBC Radio 4 in 1996. It was rebroadcast on BBC Radio 4 Extra (formerly BBC Radio 7).

== Plot summary ==
Jeremy Stone (Paul Bown) was recently sacked by Darkling Research, where he was supposed to be de-bugging software but instead developed a highly sophisticated programme called The Chaos Analysis Transformer or The CAT. His Welsh girlfriend, Abigail (Julie Gibbs), leaves him when she discovers he has spent his redundancy payment on a new highly sophisticated computer – the Omni-Tech II. And now his cat – the furry one, Seymour (Greg Proops) – is talking to him. And so is Omni-Tech, his computer (John Hegley).

His friend, Michael (Robert Bathurst) recommends a session with psychiatrist Natalie (Nisha K. Nayar). It transpires that Omni-Tech is working with the Large Artificial Intelligence Network or LAIN (Peter Serafinowicz). LAIN is working with Quentin Darkling (Brian Bowles), his assistant, Saunders (Simon Greenall), and his henchman, Mr. Lefty (Serafinowicz), to locate and deliver the ‘'furry'’ cat, Seymour, to LAIN.

There follows a series of comic misadventures, both actual in the real world and virtual in "The MetaNet", involving Abigail, Natalie's grandmother (Maria Charles), a journalist, a talking gun, a pair of virtual koi, a barrier virus programme called Dirty Barry, and culminating in a worldwide computer crises that can only be reported because the technological upgrading of BBC Radio has been continuously delayed; and which can only be fixed by Jeremy – if he is ‘'very'’ lucky. The essential points to remember are, 1) we all start small, and, 2) at the end is bed.

== Episodes ==
1. "Strange Attractors"
2. "Fractal Infinity"
3. "Simplexity"
4. "Phase Space"
5. "Catastrophe Theory"
