= Candice Patton =

American actress

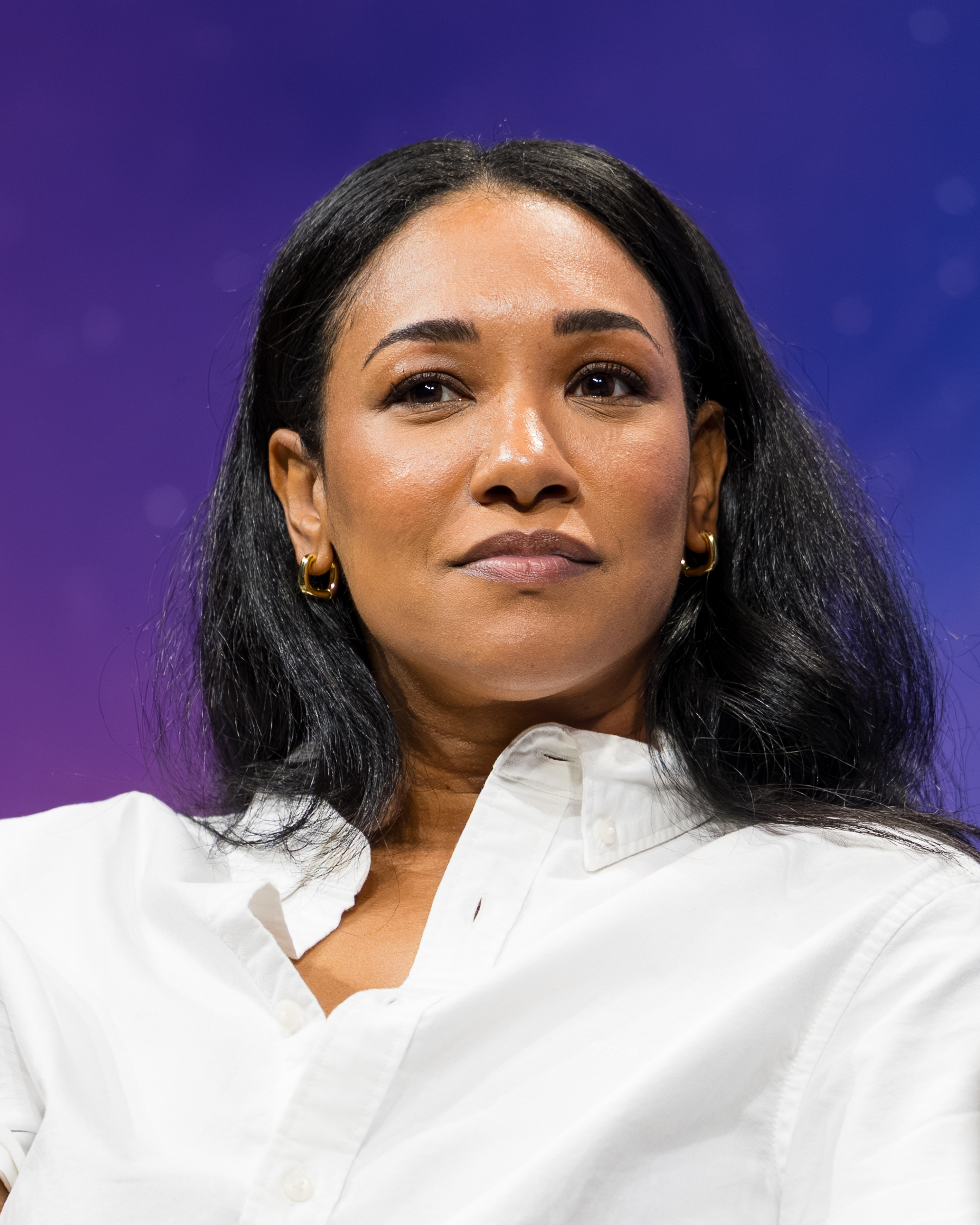
- Patton at GalaxyCon Oklahoma City in 2026
- Born: 1988 or 1989 (age 37–38); Jackson, Mississippi, U.S.
- Education: Southern Methodist University
- Occupation: Actress
- Years active: 2004–present
- Children: 1

Candice Patton (born 1988 or 1989) is an American actress. She portrayed Iris West-Allen in the 2014 television series The Flash.

== Early life ==
Patton was born in Jackson, Mississippi, and raised in Plano, Texas. She attended Southern Methodist University in Dallas, graduating with a BFA in Theatre.

== Career ==
In May 2004, following her first year in university, Patton took part in CBS' Soap Star Screen Test, a nationwide audition contest for university students to win a role on the soap opera The Young and the Restless. Patton won the contest alongside Ethan Rains. In 2008, Patton had a starring role in The WB's web series Sorority Forever and a role in the independent film Commander and Chief.

Patton was cast for many television series, including the soap opera The Bold and the Beautiful. She portrayed Iris West in The Flash for The CW. The role led to her appearing on other Arrowverse shows including Arrow, Supergirl, Legends of Tomorrow, and Batwoman. In the third-season episode "Duet", she played Millie Foss, the daughter of gangsters, in a dream world scenario. Her role as Iris West garnered her a Saturn Award for Best Supporting Actress on Television in 2017.

== Charity work ==
In 2017, along with her Arrowverse co-stars Patton co-founded Shethority ("She + Authority"), an online global collective described as "a positive place for women and the feminine to inspire, empower, and share." Active members of the initiative include Melissa Benoist, Nicole Maines, Chyler Leigh, Caity Lotz, Maisie Richardson-Sellers, Tala Ashe, Emily Bett Rickards, Juliana Harkavy, Katie Cassidy and Danielle Panabaker. Through social media, women share their own stories and experiences on dealing with self-acceptance, homophobia, sexual harassment at the workplace and so on. Shethority has its own clothing line, from which all the money collected will be donated to non-profit organizations fighting for girls and women rights, such as Girls Not Brides and Girls, Inc..

In May and June 2019, Patton, DC Comics Co-Publisher Jim Lee, writer Tom King, and fellow CW series actresses Nafessa Williams and Danielle Panabaker toured five U.S. military bases in Kuwait with the United Service Organizations (USO), where they visited the approximately 12,000 U.S. military personnel stationed in that country as part of DC's 80th anniversary of Batman celebration.

== Personal life ==
In September 2024, Patton gave birth to her first child with former pro basketball player J.R. Smith.

== Filmography ==
Film
Year	Title	Role
2012	Commander and Chief	Dana
2014	The Guest	Sgt. Halway

Television
Year	Title	Role	Notes
2004–2005	The Young and the Restless	Robin	5 episodes
2007	The Bold and the Beautiful	Candy	1 episode
2008	Casanovas	Actress #2	Episode: "Hollywood Heartburn"
2009	Entourage	Dan Coakley's assistant	3 episodes
2009	Castle	Young woman	Episode: "Inventing the Girl"
2009	Heroes	Olivia	2 episodes
2008–2009	Days of Our Lives	Jill / Alicia	2 episodes
2010	The Forgotten	Kelly	Episode: "Double Doe"
2010	One Tree Hill	Tanisha	2 episodes
2010	Grey's Anatomy	Meg Waylon	Episode: "Almost Grown"
2011	The Craigslist Killer	Kate	Television film
2011	Harry's Law	Denise Raines	Episode: "American Dreams"
2011	CSI: Miami	Wendy Gibson	Episode: "Blood Lust"
2011	Love Bites	Liz Beth	Episode: "Modern Plagues"
2011	Man Up!	Dana	3 episodes
2012	Rizzoli & Isles	Mrs. Avery	Episode: "This Is How a Heart Breaks"
2013	The Game	Tori	8 episodes
2014–2023	The Flash	Iris West-Allen (Note: Also makes appearances in The Flash as Hannibal Bates / Everyman in the episode "Who Is Harrison Wells?", Detective Iris West-Allen (Earth-2) in the episodes "Welcome to Earth-2" and "Escape from Earth-2", Millie Foss in the episode "Duet", Harrison "H. R." Wells (Earth-19) in the episodes "Infantino Street" and "Finish Line", and Mirror Iris West-Allen in 7 episodes of season 6.) (Note: Was going by Iris West until the episode "Crisis on Earth-X, Part 4" of the TV series Legends of Tomorrow. Also, going by the title "The Flash" in the episode "Run, Iris, Run" of The Flash.)	Main role; 184 episodes
2017	Supergirl	Iris West-Allen	Episode: "Crisis on Earth-X, Part 1"
2017	Arrow	Iris West-Allen	Episode: "Crisis on Earth-X, Part 2"
2017	Legends of Tomorrow	Iris West-Allen	Episode: "Crisis on Earth-X, Part 4"
2019	Batwoman	Iris West-Allen	Episode: "Crisis on Infinite Earths: Part Two"
2017, 2020	Whose Line Is It Anyway?	Herself	Episode 3 of season 5 (season 13 in Wikipedia terms); episode 6 of season 8 (season 16 in Wikipedia terms)

Web
Year	Title	Role	Notes
2008	Sorority Forever	Mercedes Muna	21 episodes
2015	Con Man	Dr. Chu Hua substitute	2 episodes

Music videos
Year	Title	Artist	Role
2017	"Good Life"	Keiynan Lonsdale	Herself/Random girl

== Awards and nominations ==
Year	Award	Category	Nominated work	Result	Ref.
2015	Teen Choice Awards	Choice TV: Breakout Star	The Flash	Nominated	
2015	Teen Choice Awards	Choice TV: Chemistry (shared with Grant Gustin)	The Flash	Nominated	
2015	Teen Choice Awards	Choice TV: Liplock (shared with Grant Gustin)	The Flash	Nominated	
2016	Teen Choice Awards	Choice TV: Chemistry shared with Grant Gustin	The Flash	Nominated	
2016	Teen Choice Awards	Choice TV: Liplock shared with Grant Gustin	The Flash	Nominated	
2017	Saturn Awards	Best Supporting Actress on Television	The Flash	Nominated	
2017	Teen Choice Awards	Choice Action TV Actress	The Flash	Nominated	
2018	Saturn Awards	Best Supporting Actress on Television	The Flash	Nominated	
2018	Teen Choice Awards	Choice Action TV Actress	The Flash	Nominated	
2018	Teen Choice Awards	Choice TV Ship	The Flash	Nominated	
2019	Teen Choice Awards	Choice Action TV Actress	The Flash	Nominated	
2019	Saturn Awards	Best Actress on Television	The Flash	Nominated	
