= Whose Line Is It Anyway? (American TV series) season 8 =

Whose Line Is It Anyway?
- Season 8
- Starring: Drew Carey; Ryan Stiles; Colin Mochrie
- No. of episodes: 21

Release
- Original network: ABC Family
- Original release: October 3, 2005 – December 15, 2007

Season chronology
- ← Previous; Season 7 Next → Season 9

The eighth season of the American television series Whose Line Is It Anyway? premiered on ABC Family on October 3, 2005, and concluded on December 15, 2007. This was the final season prior to the 2013 revival on The CW.

== Cast ==
=== Main ===
- Drew Carey
- Ryan Stiles
- Colin Mochrie

=== Recurring ===
- Wayne Brady (seventeen episodes)
- Brad Sherwood (eight episodes)
- Greg Proops (five episodes)
- Denny Siegel (four episodes)
- Patrick Bristow (two episodes)
- Kathy Greenwood (two episodes)
- Chip Esten (one episode)
- Stephen Colbert (one episode)
- Ian Gomez (one episode)
- Jeff Davis (one episode)

== Episodes ==
The "winner(s)" of each episode – as chosen by host Drew Carey – are highlighted in italics. The winner would take his or her seat and call a sketch for Drew to perform (often with the help of the rest).

No. overall	No. in season	Performers	Original release date	Prod. code
199	1	Wayne Brady, Denny Siegel, Colin Mochrie, Ryan Stiles	October 3, 2005	8001
Games performed: Fashion Models, Let's Make a Date, Narrate, Film Dub, Film Theatre and Television Styles, Hey You Down There, Props, Hoedown
200	2	Wayne Brady, Chip Esten, Colin Mochrie, Ryan Stiles	October 10, 2005	8002
Games performed: Weird Newscasters, Title Sequence, Scenes from a Hat, Greatest Hits, Hoedown
201	3	Brad Sherwood, Patrick Bristow, Colin Mochrie, Ryan Stiles	October 17, 2005	8003
Games performed: Questions Only, Sound Effects, Song Styles, Sportscasters, Props, Daytime Talk Show, Hoedown, Stand Sit and Bend
202	4	Greg Proops, Wayne Brady, Colin Mochrie, Ryan Stiles	November 7, 2005	8004
Games performed: Let's Make a Date, Fashion Models, Props, Scene To Rap, Party Quirks, Hoedown, Helping Hands
203	5	Wayne Brady, Kathy Greenwood, Colin Mochrie, Ryan Stiles	November 21, 2005	8005
Games performed: Let's Make a Date, Sound Effects (with audience members), Two-Line Vocabulary, Party Quirks, Themed Restaurant
204	6	Brad Sherwood, Wayne Brady, Colin Mochrie, Ryan Stiles	December 12, 2005	8010
Christmas show. Games performed: Questions With Wigs, Duet, Sound Effects (with audience members), Scenes from a Hat, Helping Hands. Special Guests: Santa Claus and Donner
205	7	Wayne Brady, Denny Siegel, Colin Mochrie, Ryan Stiles	March 20, 2006	8017
Games performed: Fashion Models, Film TV and Theatre Styles, Scene To Rap, Old Job-New Job, Narrate, Hats, Hoedown
206	8	Brad Sherwood, Wayne Brady, Colin Mochrie, Ryan Stiles	March 21, 2006	8011
Games performed: Daytime Talk Show, Sound Effects, Scene To Rap, Ice Skaters, Improbable Mission, Dead Bodies, Questions Only
207	9	Wayne Brady, Stephen Colbert, Colin Mochrie, Ryan Stiles	March 22, 2006	8013
Games performed: Superheroes, Scene To Music, Song Styles, Newsflash, Stand Sit Bend, Foreign Film Dub, Helping Hands
208	10	Greg Proops, Wayne Brady, Colin Mochrie, Ryan Stiles	March 23, 2006	8012
Games performed: Award Show, Newsflash, Irish Drinking Song, Hats, Film Dub, Greatest Hits, World's Worst
209	11	Brad Sherwood, Wayne Brady, Colin Mochrie, Ryan Stiles	March 24, 2006	8019
Games performed: Questions Only, Secret, Duet, Backwards Scene, Party Quirks, Daytime Talk Show, Hoedown
210	12	Brad Sherwood, Wayne Brady, Colin Mochrie, Ryan Stiles	November 6, 2006	8014
Games performed: Fashion Models, Number of Words, Doo-Wop, Scenes from a Hat, Party Quirks, Bartender, Quick Change
211	13	Wayne Brady, Denny Siegel, Colin Mochrie, Ryan Stiles	November 7, 2006	8008
Games performed: Weird Newscasters, Song Styles, Narrate, Props, Greatest Hits, Dead Bodies
212	14	Brad Sherwood, Ian Gomez, Colin Mochrie, Ryan Stiles	November 8, 2006	8006
Games performed: Daytime Talk Show, Film TV and Theatre Styles, Song Styles, Newsflash, Props, Sportscasters, 90 Second Alphabet
213	15	Brad Sherwood, Patrick Bristow, Colin Mochrie, Ryan Stiles	November 9, 2006	8015
Games performed: Let's Make a Date, Film TV and Theatre Styles, Weird Newscasters, Secret, Newsflash, Scene To Rap
214	16	Greg Proops, Wayne Brady, Colin Mochrie, Ryan Stiles	November 10, 2006	8007
Games performed: Superheroes, Sound Effects, Props, Hey You Down There, Daytime Talk Show, Scene To Rap, Hats/Dating Service Videos
215	17	Wayne Brady, Kathy Greenwood, Colin Mochrie, Ryan Stiles	December 4, 2007	8009
Games performed: Let's Make a Date, Whose Line, Props, Greatest Hits, Foreign Film Dub
216	18	Wayne Brady, Jeff Davis, Colin Mochrie, Ryan Stiles	December 13, 2007	8016
Games performed: Hollywood Director, Whose Line, Two-Line Vocabulary, Greatest Hits, World's Worst
217	19	Greg Proops, Wayne Brady, Colin Mochrie, Ryan Stiles	December 14, 2007	8018
Games performed: Questions Only, Film TV and Theatre Styles, Song Styles, Props, Game Show, Hats, Scene To Rap
218	20	Brad Sherwood, Wayne Brady, Colin Mochrie, Ryan Stiles	December 15, 2007	8020
Games performed: Let's Make a Date, Film TV and Theatre Styles, Game Show, Shopping From Home, Scenes from a Hat, Hoedown
219	21	Greg Proops, Denny Siegel, Colin Mochrie, Ryan Stiles	December 15, 2007	8021
Games performed: Superheroes, Sound Effects, Film TV and Theatre Styles, Let's Make a Date, Number of Words, Moving People, Foreign Film Dub
