= Whose Line Is It Anyway? (American TV series) season 9 =

Whose Line Is It Anyway?
- Season 9
- Starring: Aisha Tyler; Ryan Stiles; Colin Mochrie; Wayne Brady
- No. of episodes: 12

Release
- Original network: The CW
- Original release: July 16 – September 24, 2013

Season chronology
- ← Previous; Season 8 Next → Season 10

The ninth season of the American television series Whose Line Is It Anyway? premiered on The CW on July 16, 2013, and concluded on September 24, 2013.

On March 1, 2013, it was announced that the series, previously canceled by ABC, would return to television on The CW, with Colin Mochrie, Ryan Stiles, and Wayne Brady all returning, with Aisha Tyler taking the role of the host, previously occupied by Drew Carey. In addition to the traditional rotating fourth improv player (often drawn from same pool of regulars that appeared on the original show), a new feature was that of a "special guest". This fifth player would not necessarily have an improv background, but would still participate in some of the improv games.

== Cast ==
=== Main ===
- Aisha Tyler
- Ryan Stiles
- Colin Mochrie
- Wayne Brady

=== Recurring ===
- Gary Anthony Williams (two episodes)
- Heather Anne Campbell (two episodes)
- Keegan-Michael Key (two episodes)
- Jonathan Mangum (two episodes)
- Jeff Davis (two episodes)
- Nyima Funk (two episodes)

== Episodes ==
The "winner(s)" of each episode – as chosen by host Aisha Tyler – are highlighted in italics. The winner(s) perform a sketch during the credit roll, just like in the original British series.

No. overall	No. in season	Performers	Special guest(s)	Original release date	Prod. code	U.S. viewers (millions)
220	1	Wayne Brady, Gary Anthony Williams, Colin Mochrie, Ryan Stiles	Lauren Cohan	July 16, 2013	111	2.92
Games performed: Let's Make a Date, Dubbing, What's in the Bag, Scenes from a Hat, Living Scenery
221	2	Wayne Brady, Heather Anne Campbell, Colin Mochrie, Ryan Stiles	Kevin McHale	July 16, 2013	103	2.99
Games performed: Scenes from a Hat, Song Styles, Dubbing, Sideways Scene, Helping Hands
222	3	Wayne Brady, Keegan-Michael Key, Colin Mochrie, Ryan Stiles	Candice Accola	July 23, 2013	106	2.48
Games performed: Hollywood Director, Props, Song Styles, Dating Profile, Living Scenery
223	4	Wayne Brady, Jonathan Mangum, Colin Mochrie, Ryan Stiles	Kyle Richards	July 30, 2013	107	2.36
Games performed: Weird Newscasters, Props, Dubbing, Sideways Scene, Helping Hands
224	5	Wayne Brady, Jeff Davis, Colin Mochrie, Ryan Stiles	Mary Killman and Mariya Koroleva	July 30, 2013	102	2.46
Games performed: Hollywood Director, Duet, Forward Rewind, Living Scenery, Sideways Scene
225	6	Wayne Brady, Gary Anthony Williams, Colin Mochrie, Ryan Stiles	Wilson Bethel	August 6, 2013	112	2.25
Games performed: Weird Newscasters, Duet, Sideways Scene, Three Headed Broadway Star, Helping Hands
226	7	Wayne Brady, Heather Anne Campbell, Colin Mochrie, Ryan Stiles	Lisa Leslie	August 13, 2013	104	2.15
Games performed: Weird Newscasters, Song Styles, Newsflash, What's in the Bag, Living Scenery
227	8	Wayne Brady, Keegan-Michael Key, Colin Mochrie, Ryan Stiles	none	August 20, 2013	105	2.28
Games performed: Questions with Wigs, Sideways Scene, What's in the Bag, Scenes from a Hat, Helping Hands
228	9	Wayne Brady, Jeff Davis, Colin Mochrie, Ryan Stiles	Laila Ali	August 27, 2013	101	2.28
Games performed: Scenes from a Hat, Props, Dubbing, Greatest Hits, Helping Hands
229	10	Wayne Brady, Nyima Funk, Colin Mochrie, Ryan Stiles	Maggie Q	September 3, 2013	109	2.48
Games performed: Hollywood Director, Dubbing, Newsflash, What's in the Bag, Helping Hands
230	11	Wayne Brady, Jonathan Mangum, Colin Mochrie, Ryan Stiles	Chloe Butler and Monique Gaxiola	September 17, 2013	108	2.43
Games performed: Hollywood Director, Duet, What's in the Bag, Scenes from a Hat, Living Scenery
231	12	Wayne Brady, Nyima Funk, Colin Mochrie, Ryan Stiles	Shawn Johnson	September 24, 2013	110	1.29
Games performed: Scenes from a Hat, Props, Sideways Scene, Living Scenery, Greatest Hits
