= Space Cadets (game show) =

British panel game show (1997)

- Presented by: Greg Proops
- Starring: Bill Bailey; Craig Charles
- Country of origin: United Kingdom
- No. of series: 1
- No. of episodes: 10 (list of episodes)

Original release
- Network: Channel 4
- Release: 15 July – 16 September 1997

Space Cadets is a British comedy panel game broadcast on Channel 4 in 1997. It was presented by "High Commander" Greg Proops with Bill Bailey and Craig Charles as the "Space Captains" (captains of the two teams). It ran for just one series with ten episodes.

Like the BBC's Have I Got News for You, the contestants were celebrities and the show was played mainly for laughs. Bestselling author Terry Pratchett once appeared as a guest. When the contestants were asked who was Britain's most shoplifted author, Pratchett immediately answered "I am!" which was the correct answer. (The other contestants and Proops all immediately pulled out "shoplifted" copies of Pratchett's books, one of which Pratchett proceeded to sign.)

== Opening sequence text ==
The following text appeared on the screen in the opening title sequence (over footage of Charles, Bailey, and Proops): 3 Cosmic Comics, On A Voyage From Planet Mirth To Combat Against The Weird, The Unthinkable, The Unknown. They Are Space Cadets.

== Rounds ==
These are only some of the rounds used on the show. It is unknown if any other rounds were played in episodes 8 or 9.

- Doctor, Who Am I? has each team captain standing center stage and being "morphed" into a character that may or may not be related to sci-fi. They then ask their teammates questions which can only be answered with "negative" or "affirmative" in order to decipher their "new identities".
- Space Oddities has each member of a team giving explanations of what they think a given object is, with only one being right. The opposing team must guess which is correct. This round was based upon the long-running panel game Call My Bluff.
- The War of The Words is like Film Dub on Whose Line Is It Anyway?, but with a sci-fi clip.
- What Happens Next? has each team guessing what happens next in a sci-fi film shown to them.
- Photon Photos has the teams guessing what is happening in a still photo and what movie it is from.
- How Did They Get Out of That? has each team watching a clip of sci-fi characters in peril and guessing how the characters get out of peril.
- Mind Your Klingon has Proops giving a phrase in the Klingon language and the players must translate the phrase into English.
- Bill Shatner or not Bill Shatner has Proops read a series of facts purporting to pertain to William Shatner. Teams, including William Shatner himself, respond 'Bill Shatner' or 'Not Bill Shatner' according to whether they believe it to be true or not.
- Final All-Comers Trivia Scan has Proops asking the teams sci-fi trivia questions until time runs out.

== Episode guide ==
The coloured backgrounds denote the result of each of the shows:

-- indicates Craig's team won
-- indicates Bill's team won

Episode	Air Date	Craig's Guests	Craig's Team Name	Bill's Guests	Bill's Team Name	Score
01x01	15 July 1997	Kim Newman and Ford Kiernan	Meteors	Hattie Hayridge and William Shatner	Comets	(Note: The score for this episode was not revealed as Proops awarded the win to the team William Shatner was a guest on.)
01x02	22 July 1997	Sara Cox and Walter Koenig	Blobs	John Moloney and Claudia Christian	Things	20–23
01x03	29 July 1997	Ford Kiernan and Sophie Aldred	Omegas	Fred MacAulay and Sylvester McCoy	Alphas	25–17
01x04	5 August 1997	Trevor Neal and Armin Shimerman	Quarks	Simon Hickson and Max Grodénchik	Roms	17–19
01x05	12 August 1997	Ford Kiernan and William Shatner	Leias	Angela Rippon and Bruce Dickinson	Lukes	
01x06	19 August 1997	Ben Miller and Kim Newman	Stingrays	Gareth Thomas and Alexander Armstrong	Thunderbirds	37–44
01x07	26 August 1997	Felix Dexter and Ed Bishop	Astronauts	Ronni Ancona and Rob Grant	Cosmonauts	16–18
01x08	2 September 1997	Terry Pratchett and Fred MacAulay	Jetsons	Elaine C. Smith and Sylvester McCoy	Rocketeers	26–23
01x09	9 September 1997	Claudia Christian and Ed Byrne	Morks	Robert Llewellyn and Susan Moore	Mindys	19-17
01x10	16 September 1997	Tricia Sullivan and Kevin Day	Vulcans	John Moloney and Chloë Annett	Klingons	22-20

== Notes and references ==
- Peter Waymark, "Space Cadets" in "Television Choice: A down-to-earth quiz", The Times, 15 July 1997, p 46.
