= Whose Line Is It Anyway? (American TV series) season 13 =

Whose Line Is It Anyway?
- Season 13
- Starring: Aisha Tyler; Ryan Stiles; Colin Mochrie; Wayne Brady
- No. of episodes: 15

Release
- Original network: The CW
- Original release: May 29 – September 28, 2017

Season chronology
- ← Previous; Season 12 Next → Season 14

The thirteenth season of the American television series Whose Line Is It Anyway? premiered on The CW on May 29, 2017, and concluded on September 28, 2017.

== Cast ==
=== Main ===
- Aisha Tyler
- Ryan Stiles
- Colin Mochrie
- Wayne Brady

=== Recurring ===
- Jonathan Mangum (four episodes)
- Jeff Davis (three episodes)
- Gary Anthony Williams (three episodes)
- Heather Anne Campbell (two episodes)
- Brad Sherwood (two episodes)
- Greg Proops (one episode)

== Episodes ==
The "winner(s)" of each episode – as chosen by host Aisha Tyler – are highlighted in italics. The winner(s) perform a sketch during the credit roll, just like in the original British series.

No. overall	No. in season	Performers	Special guest	Original release date	Prod. code	U.S. viewers (millions)
296	1	Wayne Brady, Heather Anne Campbell, Colin Mochrie, Ryan Stiles	Tony Hawk	May 29, 2017	418	0.94
Games Performed: Weird Newscasters, Song Styles, Themed Restaurant, Scenes from a Hat, Helping Hands
297	2	Wayne Brady, Jeff Davis, Colin Mochrie, Ryan Stiles	The Bella Twins	June 5, 2017	420	1.09
Games Performed: Questions with Hats, Duet, Sound Effects, Scenes from a Hat, Living Scenery, Hoedown
298	3	Wayne Brady, Jeff Davis, Colin Mochrie, Ryan Stiles	Candice Patton	June 12, 2017	407	0.95
Games Performed: Let's Make a Date, World's Worst, Living Scenery, Props, Scenes From a Hat, Hoedown
299	4	Wayne Brady, Gary Anthony Williams, Colin Mochrie, Ryan Stiles	Malcolm Goodwin	June 19, 2017	415	1.00
Games Performed: Hollywood Director, World's Worst, Duet, Scenes from a Hat, Doo-Wop, Helping Hands
300	5	Wayne Brady, Gary Anthony Williams, Colin Mochrie, Ryan Stiles	Wil Wheaton	July 10, 2017	401	1.07
Games Performed: Questions with Hats, Duet, Secret, Scenes from a Hat, Helping Hands
301	6	Wayne Brady, Jonathan Mangum, Colin Mochrie, Ryan Stiles	Kearran Giovanni	July 17, 2017	422	0.94
Games Performed: Weird Newscasters, Duet, World's Worst, Living Scenery, Greatest Hits
302	7	Wayne Brady, Brad Sherwood, Colin Mochrie, Ryan Stiles	none	July 24, 2017	411	1.01
Games Performed: Weird Newscasters, Hoedown, Whose Line, Scenes from a Hat, Greatest Hits
303	8	Wayne Brady, Jonathan Mangum, Colin Mochrie, Ryan Stiles	Ralph Macchio	August 3, 2017	421	1.33
Games Performed: Questions with Hats, Duet, Themed Restaurant, Scenes from a Hat, Doo-Wop, Helping Hands
304	9	Wayne Brady, Greg Proops, Colin Mochrie, Ryan Stiles	Tony Cavalero	August 10, 2017	414	1.27
Games Performed: Let's Make a Date, Song Styles, Secret, Film Dub, Dubbing, Scenes From a Hat
305	10	Wayne Brady, Heather Anne Campbell, Colin Mochrie, Ryan Stiles	Jillian Michaels	August 17, 2017	417	1.28
Games Performed: Hollywood Director, Worlds Worst, Song Styles, Scenes From a Hat, Dubbing, Doo-Wop
306	11	Wayne Brady, Jeff Davis, Colin Mochrie, Ryan Stiles	Chip Esten	August 24, 2017	502	1.22
Games Performed: Let's Make a Date, Props, Hoedown, Scenes from a Hat, Greatest Hits
307	12	Wayne Brady, Jonathan Mangum, Colin Mochrie, Ryan Stiles	Wanya Morris	September 7, 2017	511	1.21
Games Performed: Hollywood Director, Duet, Themed Restaurant, Scenes from a Hat, Helping Hands
308	13	Wayne Brady, Gary Anthony Williams, Colin Mochrie, Ryan Stiles	Danielle Panabaker	September 14, 2017	504	1.21
Games Performed: Let's Make a Date, Duet, Mixed Messages, Scenes from a Hat, Living Scenery
309	14	Wayne Brady, Jonathan Mangum, Colin Mochrie, Ryan Stiles	Marisol Nichols	September 21, 2017	510	1.19
Games Performed: Weird Newscasters, Duet, Living Scenery, Props, Greatest Hits
310	15	Wayne Brady, Brad Sherwood, Colin Mochrie, Ryan Stiles	Grace Byers	September 28, 2017	509	0.99
Games Performed: Hollywood Director, Duet, Mixed Messages, Scenes from a Hat, Helping Hands
