= Greg Proops =

American actor

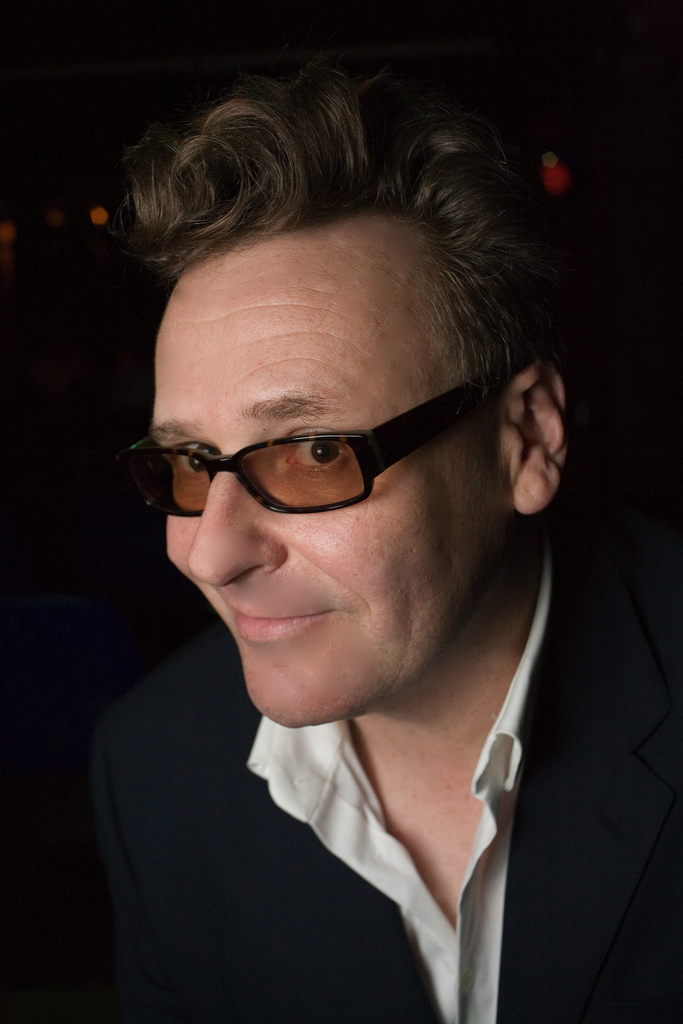
- Proops in 2007
- Born: Gregory Everett Proops; October 3, 1959 (age 67); Phoenix, Arizona, U.S.
- Occupations: Actor; stand-up comedian; television host
- Years active: 1982–present
- Notable work: Whose Line Is It Anyway? UK and USA; Bob the Builder
- Spouse: Jennifer Canaga (m. 1990)

Comedy career
- Genres: Improvisational comedy; observational comedy
- Website: www.gregproops.com

Gregory Everett Proops (born October 3, 1959) is an American actor, stand-up comedian and television host. He is widely known for his work on the British and American versions of Whose Line Is It Anyway?. He has also voiced the titular character on the American version of Bob the Builder: Project: Build It in series 10 to 14.

== Early life ==
Proops was born in Phoenix, Arizona, and raised in San Carlos, California, a suburb south of San Francisco, attending San Carlos High School. He attended the College of San Mateo and spearheaded the comedy duo "Proops & Brakeman". Later, he took courses in improvisation and acting at San Francisco State University, though he never finished college.

== Career ==
=== Improv comedy ===
After college, he joined an improv group with Mike McShane. Both Proops and McShane impressed producers Dan Patterson and Mark Leveson, who put them on their show, Whose Line Is It Anyway?. He frequently instigated jokes concerning various idiosyncrasies and differences between British English and American English, and would frequently banter with Clive Anderson on these matters (among others). He lived in London for four years when he was doing the show and lists McShane, Richard Vranch and Colin Mochrie among his best friends. After the show ended, he was recalled for the American version and has been a frequent "fourth contestant". Through 2020, he has appeared in 74 American Whose Line episodes, more than any other non-regular cast member.

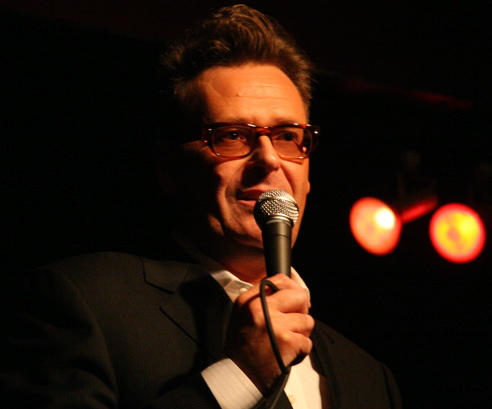
Proops performing in a nightclub in 2008

Proops also appeared in every episode of the short-lived Drew Carey's Green Screen Show, where the performers would play improv games (some of which were taken from the show's main influence Whose Line Is It Anyway?) in front of a massive green screen. Later, animators would draw on the background and other props. In April 2011, Drew Carey's Improv-A-Ganza premiered on GSN featuring Proops along with other frequent guests from Whose Line is it Anyway? In July 2012, Proops appeared in ABC's improvisation show, Trust Us with Your Life.

In November 2011, Proops did a week on Royal Caribbean's Freedom of the Seas with the Lewis Black Comedy Cruise Tour. He performed the entire week of stand-up with other artists, which included a live, one-hour podcast in front of his entire audience.

=== Film and television ===
Proops has performed his stand-up act across Britain, mainland Europe, Australia and New Zealand. His other credits include hosting Space Cadets, a mid-1990s science-fiction comedy game show on Channel 4 in the UK, which also featured Craig Charles (Dave Lister from Red Dwarf) and Bill Bailey, and appearances on BBC2's Mock the Week. He appeared as a panelist on the 2000 revival of To Tell the Truth. Proops has also hosted game shows, including VS. in 1999, Rendez-View in 2001, and Head Games, a Science Channel game show which ran for one season in 2009. Proops also competed on the November 8th, 1984 episode of Jeopardy!, losing to eventual five day champion John Genova. He would later record video clues for two Jeopardy! episodes in 2000 and 2001.

In addition to his stand-up and improv acts, Proops has done voice work in various films and TV shows, including Tim Burton's The Nightmare Before Christmas, and the miniseries Stripperella with Pamela Anderson. Proops provided the voice of Bob in the US version of the TV series Bob the Builder for the five seasons of Project Build It. He has also featured in 2003 film Brother Bear as the voice of one of the Love Bears and provided the voice as Cryptograf in 2006 film Asterix and the Vikings.

Proops has been involved with Turner Classic Movies since 2013, appearing on several of the network's podcasts and in person at public events. In 2016, he appeared as a television presenter for TCM, introducing comedy films by the Marx Brothers and Wheeler & Woolsey.

Proops has been involved with the Star Wars franchise as well. He played the role of Fode in Star Wars: Episode I – The Phantom Menace. He would later work with the Expanded Universe, reprising his role as Fode in the video game Star Wars Episode I: Racer and the video game adaptation of Star Wars Episode I: The Phantom Menace, and he guest-starred on two episodes of the animated series Star Wars: The Clone Wars ("The Mandalore Plot" and "Voyage of Temptation") as Tal Merrick. In 2018, Proops voiced Jak Sivrak in Star Wars Resistance.

Proops appeared as a guest on The George Lucas Talk Show during their May the AR Be LI$$ You Arli$$ marathon fundraiser.

=== Radio and podcast ===
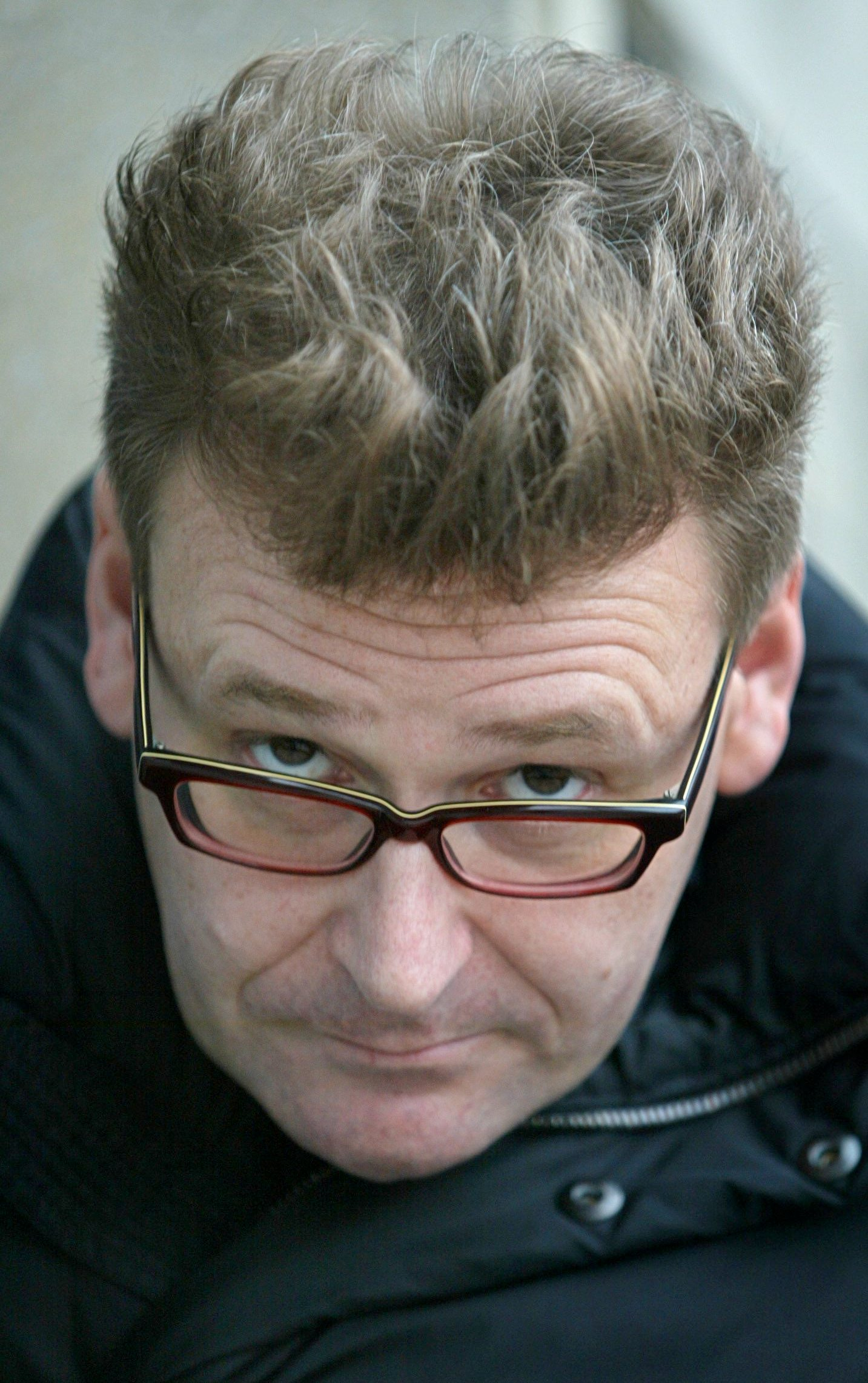
Proops in 2007

Since 2010, Proops has hosted a podcast called The Smartest Man In The World, often together with his wife Jennifer Canaga, in which he talks about current events, celebrity culture, and his personal life, usually in front of a live audience. Before Smartest Man, Proops hosted a podcast called The Greg Proops Experiment.

In 2010, Proops hosted Odd News on yahoo!.com for several years. It was a weekly program where he told weird and funny stories from around the world. The series seems to have continued in text format and on Twitter for several years after Proops was no longer a part of it.

From 1995 to 1996, Proops presented Bits from Last Week's Radio on BBC Radio 1. He did voice work for the BBC Radio 2 series Flight of the Conchords, first broadcast in September 2005. Proops also played the title role in BBC Radio 4's sci-fi comedy series Seymour the Fractal Cat.

Proops provided the voices for the Harlequin Demon, the Devil, and the Sax Player in Tim Burton's The Nightmare Before Christmas soundtrack and movie.

=== Video games ===
Proops provides voice-over work as Howard "Buckshot" Holmes, a game show announcer along with John DiMaggio for the Nintendo Wii game MadWorld. DiMaggio and Proops play as comical announcers on a brutal game show set in the future.

Proops provided the voice of Matthew Black, a reporter in the Psygnosis game, ZombieVille (1997).

Proops also provided the voice of Fargus, a pyromantic court jester for the PlayStation Pandemonium game series.

He later worked as a voice actor in Skylanders: Imaginators, where he voiced a Brain that was freed by Kaos in order to help perfect his Doomlanders project.

=== Comedy albums ===
- Live (1994)
- Back in the UK (1997)
- Joke Book (2006)
- Houston, We Have a Problem (2007)
- Elsewhere (2009)
- Greg Proops Digs In! (2010)
- In the Ball Park (2015)
- The Resistance (2018)
- In The City (2022)
- French Drug Deal (2023)

=== Comedy specials ===
- Greg Proops: Live At Musso & Frank (2013)

=== The Smartest Book in the World ===
On May 5, 2015, Proops released nonfiction book The Smartest Book in the World through publisher Touchstone. The book is based in part on Proops's weekly podcast The Smartest Man in the World, detailing the author's movie and poetry recommendations, baseball facts, powerful women, and misconstrued history. The paperback version of the book was released from Touchstone on February 21, 2017.

== Filmography ==
=== Film ===
Year	Title	Role	Notes
1993	The Nightmare Before Christmas	Harlequin Demon, Devil, Sax Player (voices)	
1999	Star Wars: Episode I – The Phantom Menace	Fode (voice)	
2003	Kaena: The Prophecy	Gommy (voice)	English dub
2003	Brother Bear	Male Lover Bear (voice)	
2005	Bob the Builder: When Bob Became a Builder	Bob and Mr. Beasley (voice)	US Dub
2006	Asterix and the Vikings	Cryptograf (voice)	English dub
2006	Bob the Builder: Built to be Wild	Bob (voice)	US Dub
2007	Super High Me	Himself	Documentary
2009	Dr. Dolittle: Million Dollar Mutts	Poodle (voice)	Direct-to-video
2011	Bad Actress	Barry	
2015	Hell and Back	Asmoday the Demon (voice)	
2018	Duck Duck Goose	Banzou (voice)	

=== Television ===
Year	Title	Role	Notes
1989–98	Whose Line Is It Anyway?	Himself	British version 67 episodes
1990	Midnight Caller	Cab Driver	Episode: "Old Friends"
1994	Anna Lee	Martin Mayhew	Episode: "Requiem"
1996	Family Matters	Café Manager	Episode: "Tips for a Better Life"
1996	Dennis the Menace	Quentin Hitchberg (voice)	Episode: "The Secret Diary"
1997	Space Cadets	Himself	10 episodes
1997	Men Behaving Badly	Billy	Episode: "The Party Favor"
1997	3rd Rock from the Sun	Yasmine	Episode: "Sensitive Dick"
1998	Mike Hammer, Private Eye	Deke Gerard	Episode: "The Life You Save"
1998–2007, 2014–present	Whose Line Is It Anyway?	Himself	American version 78 episodes
1999	The Jamie Foxx Show	Jon Marc	Episode: "Bro-Jack"
2000	Veronica's Closet	Richard Small	Episode: "Veronica's Tattooed Man"
2000–03	The Drew Carey Show	Greg, Derek	3 episodes
2001	Hollywood Squares	Himself	12 episodes
2001	Mike, Lu & Og	Additional Voices	Episode: "A Learning Experience/We the People"
2001, 2003	Lloyd in Space	Additional Voices	2 episodes
2002	Just Shoot Me!	Turtleneck Guy	Episode: "Educating Finch"
2003	10-8: Officers on Duty	Jewelry Store Owner	Episode: "Late for School"
2003–04	Stripperella	Bernard (voice)	7 episodes
2005–07	Bob the Builder	Bob, Mr. Beastley (voice)	U.S. dub 70 episodes
2006	Ugly Betty	TV Fashion Reporter	Episode: "Queens for a Day"
2007–16	Red Eye	Himself	9 episodes
2008–11	True Jackson, VP	Max Madigan	47 episodes
2009	Flight of the Conchords	Martin Clark	Episode: "A Good Opportunity"
2010	Who Wants to Be a Millionaire	Himself	5 episodes
2010	Star Wars: The Clone Wars	Tal Merrick (voice)	2 episodes
2011	Drew Carey's Improv-A-Ganza	Himself	20 episodes
2012	QI	Himself	Episode: "Jungles"
2014–17	@midnight	Himself	9 episodes
2016	Lego Star Wars: The Freemaker Adventures	Fode (voice)	Episode: "Race on Tatooine"
2016	Uncle Grandpa	Cupid (voice)	Episode: "Uncle Cupid"
2017–18	The Powerpuff Girls	Isosceles, Additional Voices	2 episodes
2018–19	Star Wars Resistance	Jak Sivrak, Garma, Stormtrooper (voices)	6 episodes
2019	Schooled	Mr. Granger	4 episodes
TBA	Damsels	Greg Proops	Post-production

=== Video games ===
Year	Title	Role
1996	Pandemonium!	Additional Voices
1997	Zombieville	Matthew Black
1999	Star Wars: Episode I – The Phantom Menace	Fode
1999	Star Wars Episode I: Racer	Fode
2001	Driven	David Doyle
2009	MadWorld	Howard "Buckshot" Holmes
2012	Kinect Star Wars	Fode
2016	Skylanders: Imaginators	Brain, Imaginators, Brawler Doomlander
2022	Lego Star Wars: The Skywalker Saga	Fode

=== Web series ===
Year	Title	Role	Notes
2008–12	Easy to Assemble	Ben Rand	8 episodes
