= Whose Line Is It Anyway? (American TV series) season 20 =

Whose Line Is It Anyway?
- Season 20
- Starring: Aisha Tyler; Ryan Stiles; Colin Mochrie; Wayne Brady
- No. of episodes: 22

Release
- Original network: The CW
- Original release: March 31, 2023 – February 6, 2024

Season chronology
- ← Previous; Season 19 Next → Season 21

The twentieth season of the American television series Whose Line Is It Anyway? premiered on The CW on March 31, 2023, and concluded on February 6, 2024.

== Production ==
On January 23, 2023, it was announced that the new season would premiere on March 31, 2023.

== Cast ==
=== Main ===
- Aisha Tyler
- Ryan Stiles
- Colin Mochrie
- Wayne Brady

=== Recurring ===
- Gary Anthony Williams (eight episodes)
- Jeff Davis (seven episodes)
- Jonathan Mangum (five episodes)
- Greg Proops (four episodes)
- Keegan-Michael Key (two episodes)
- Nyima Funk (one episode)
- Brad Sherwood (one episode)

== Episodes ==
"Winner(s)" of each episode as chosen by host Aisha Tyler are highlighted in italics. The winner(s) perform a sketch during the credit roll, just like in the original British series.

No. overall	No. in season	Performers	Special guest	Original release date	Prod. code	U.S. viewers (millions)
394	1	Wayne Brady, Jeff Davis, Keegan-Michael Key, Colin Mochrie, Ryan Stiles	Candice Accola	March 31, 2023	1209	0.48
Games performed: Forward Rewind, Hats/Dating Service Video, Daytime Talk Show, Scenes from a Hat, Dubbing (w/Candice Accola), Greatest Hits
395	2	Wayne Brady, Brad Sherwood, Jonathan Mangum, Gary Anthony Williams, Colin Mochrie, Ryan Stiles	Marisol Nichols	April 7, 2023	1208	0.43
Games performed: Party Quirks, Dubbing (w/Marisol Nichols), Piranha Tank, Doo Wop, Scenes from a Hat, Greatest Hits
396	3	Wayne Brady, Gary Anthony Williams, Colin Mochrie, Ryan Stiles	Penn & Teller	April 14, 2023	1201	0.55
Games performed: Hollywood Director, Scenes from a Hat, Radio Show (w/Penn & Teller), Greatest Hits
397	4	Wayne Brady, Keegan-Michael Key, Colin Mochrie, Ryan Stiles	none	April 21, 2023	1203	0.52
Games performed: Scenes from a Hat, Sideways Scene, Stand Sit Bend, Irish Drinking Song, Greatest Hits
398	5	Wayne Brady, Gary Anthony Williams, Jeff Davis, Colin Mochrie, Ryan Stiles	Danielle Panabaker	April 28, 2023	1207	0.44
Games performed: Scenes to Music, Themed Restaurant (w/Danielle Panabaker), Doo-Wop, Daytime Talk Show, Scenes from a Hat, Scenes with Masks, Hoedown
399	6	Wayne Brady, Jeff Davis, Colin Mochrie, Ryan Stiles	Rachel Bloom	May 5, 2023	1204	0.44
Games performed: Weird Newscasters, Dubbing (w/Rachel Bloom), Party Quirks, Scenes from a Hat, Greatest Hits
400	7	Wayne Brady, Nyima Funk, Colin Mochrie, Ryan Stiles	Jack Osbourne	May 12, 2023	1202	0.36
Games performed: Scenes from a Hat, Song Styles (w/Jack Osbourne), Informercial, Irish Drinking Song, Greatest Hits
401	8	Wayne Brady, Gary Anthony Williams, Jeff Davis, Jonathan Mangum, Colin Mochrie, Ryan Stiles	none	May 19, 2023	1210	0.47
Games performed: Get Down, Lounge Lizards, Infomercial, Scenes from a Hat, Newsflash, Show-Stopping Number, Greatest Hits
402	9	Wayne Brady, Gary Anthony Williams, Colin Mochrie, Ryan Stiles	Mircea Monroe	June 2, 2023	1205	0.50
Games performed: Let's Make A Date, Duet (w/Mircea Monroe), Scenes from a Hat, Newsflash, Irish Drinking Song, Greatest Hits
403	10	Wayne Brady, Greg Proops, Colin Mochrie, Ryan Stiles	Kat Graham	June 9, 2023	1206	0.43
Games performed: Weird Newscasters, 90 Second Alphabet, Dubbing (w/Kat Graham), Scenes from a Hat, Greatest Hits
404	11	Wayne Brady, Jonathan Mangum, Colin Mochrie, Ryan Stiles	Tiffany Haddish	November 14, 2023	1221	0.46
Games performed: Hollywood Director, Duet (w/Tiffany Haddish), Scenes from a Hat, Helping Hands (w/Tiffany Haddish)
405	12	Wayne Brady, Jonathan Mangum, Colin Mochrie, Ryan Stiles	Tiffany Coyne	November 14, 2023	1220	0.48
Games performed: Questions with Hats, Duet (w/Tiffany Coyne), Props, Living Scenery (w/Tiffany Coyne), Greatest Hits
406	13	Wayne Brady, Greg Proops, Colin Mochrie, Ryan Stiles	Jordin Sparks	November 21, 2023	1214	0.48
Games performed: Weird Newscasters, Song Styles (w/Jordin Sparks), Scenes from a Hat, Helping Hands (w/Jordin Sparks)
407	14	Wayne Brady, Jeff Davis, Colin Mochrie, Ryan Stiles	Maile Brady	November 28, 2023	1212	0.32
Games performed: Press Conference, Duet (w/Maile Brady), Mixed Messages, Props (w/Maile Brady), Film Dub, Dubbing (w/Maile Brady)
408	15	Wayne Brady, Jeff Davis, Colin Mochrie, Ryan Stiles	none	December 5, 2023	1213	0.30
Games performed: Hollywood Director, Scenes from a Hat, Sound Effects (w/audience members), Doo-Wop, Living Scenery
409	16	Wayne Brady, Gary Anthony Williams, Colin Mochrie, Ryan Stiles	Alyson Hannigan	December 12, 2023	1217	0.42
Games performed: Questions, Doo-Wop, Dubbing (w/Alyson Hannigan), Scenes from a Hat, Helping Hands (w/Alyson Hannigan)
410	17	Wayne Brady, Greg Proops, Colin Mochrie, Ryan Stiles	none	December 19, 2023	1216	0.32
Games performed: Questions, Scenes from a Hat, Whose Line, Film Dub, Greatest Hits
411	18	Wayne Brady, Gary Anthony Williams, Colin Mochrie, Ryan Stiles	Mark Ballas	January 9, 2024	1218	0.40
Games performed: Weird Newscasters, Deleted Scenes, Duet (w/Mark Ballas), Props, Living Scenery (w/Mark Ballas), Scenes from a Hat
412	19	Wayne Brady, Gary Anthony Williams, Colin Mochrie, Ryan Stiles	none	January 16, 2024	1219	0.31
Games performed: Hollywood Director, Sound Effects (w/audience members), Scenes from a Hat, Greatest Hits
413	20	Wayne Brady, Greg Proops, Colin Mochrie, Ryan Stiles	Chris Lee	January 23, 2024	1215	0.42
Games performed: Dating App (Let's Make A Date), Mixed Messages, Props (w/Chris Lee), Doo-Wop, Living Scenery (w/Chris Lee)
414	21	Wayne Brady, Jonathan Mangum, Colin Mochrie, Ryan Stiles	Kaila Mullady	January 30, 2024	1222	0.52
Games performed: Weird Newscasters, Duet (w/Kaila Mullady), Scenes from a Hat, Greatest Hits
415	22	Wayne Brady, Jeff Davis, Colin Mochrie, Ryan Stiles	none	February 6, 2024	1211A	0.47
Games performed: Dating App (Let’s Make A Date), Superheroes, Newsflash, Scenes from a Hat, Greatest Hits
