= Whose Line Is It Anyway? (American TV series) season 21 =

Whose Line Is It Anyway?
- Season 21
- Starring: Aisha Tyler; Ryan Stiles; Colin Mochrie; Wayne Brady
- No. of episodes: 16

Release
- Original network: The CW
- Original release: September 6 – November 1, 2024

Season chronology
- ← Previous; Season 20

The twenty-first and final season of the American television series Whose Line Is It Anyway? premiered on The CW on September 6, 2024, and concluded on November 1, 2024.

== Production ==
On May 16, 2024, the series was renewed for a twenty-first season which premiered on September 6, 2024.

== Cast ==
=== Main ===
- Aisha Tyler
- Ryan Stiles
- Colin Mochrie
- Wayne Brady (absent from episode 8)

=== Recurring ===
- Greg Proops (four episodes)
- Jonathan Mangum (four episodes)
- Brad Sherwood (three episodes)
- Gary Anthony Williams (three episodes)
- Jeff Davis (two episodes)
- Heather Anne Campbell (one episode)

== Episodes ==
"Winner(s)" of each episode as chosen by host Aisha Tyler are highlighted in italics. The winner(s) perform a sketch during the credit roll, just like in the original British series.

No. overall	No. in season	Performers	Special guest(s)	Original release date	Prod. code	U.S. viewers (millions)
416	1	Wayne Brady, Greg Proops, Colin Mochrie, Ryan Stiles	Jordin Sparks	September 6, 2024	1304	0.43
Games performed: Hollywood Director, Dubbing (w/Jordin Sparks), Scenes from a Hat, Greatest Hits
417	2	Wayne Brady, Jonathan Mangum, Colin Mochrie, Ryan Stiles	Tiffany Haddish	September 6, 2024	1303	0.39
Games performed: Sound Effects (w/audience members), Scenes from a Hat, Three-Headed Broadway Star (w/Tiffany Haddish), Whose Line, Greatest Hits
418	3	Wayne Brady, Gary Anthony Williams, Colin Mochrie, Ryan Stiles	Alyson Hannigan	September 13, 2024	1313	0.43
Games performed: Dating App (Let's Make A Date), Mixed Messages, Song Styles (w/Alyson Hannigan), Whose Line, Themed Restaurant (w/Alyson Hannigan)
419	4	Wayne Brady, Gary Anthony Williams, Colin Mochrie, Ryan Stiles	Mark Ballas	September 13, 2024	1301	0.39
Games performed: Deleted Scenes, Duet (w/Mark Ballas & an audience member), 90 Second Alphabet, Scenes from a Hat, Greatest Hits
420	5	Wayne Brady, Jonathan Mangum, Colin Mochrie, Ryan Stiles	Chris Jackson	September 27, 2024	1305	0.46
Games performed: Scenes from a Hat, Duet (w/Chris Jackson & an audience member), Whose Line, Doo-Wop, Themed Restaurant (w/Chris Jackson), Greatest Hits
421	6	Wayne Brady, Greg Proops, Colin Mochrie, Ryan Stiles	none	September 27, 2024	1307	0.51
Games performed: Superheroes, Sound Effects (w/audience members), Doo-Wop, Scenes from a Hat, Greatest Hits
422	7	Wayne Brady, Jonathan Mangum, Colin Mochrie, Ryan Stiles	Kaila Mullady	October 4, 2024	1315	0.45
Games performed: Forward Rewind, Deleted Scenes, Scene with Sound (w/Kaila Mullady), Scenes from a Hat, Greatest Hits
423	8	Brad Sherwood, Jeff Davis, Colin Mochrie, Ryan Stiles	Misty May-Treanor	October 4, 2024	1316	0.41
Games performed: Hollywood Director, Hoedown, Dubbing (w/Misty May-Treanor), Scenes from a Hat, Living Scenery (w/Misty May-Treanor)
424	9	Wayne Brady, Heather Anne Campbell, Colin Mochrie, Ryan Stiles	none	October 11, 2024	1311	0.53
Games performed: Let’s Make A Date, Sound Effects (w/audience members), Questions, Whose Line, Greatest Hits
425	10	Wayne Brady, Greg Proops, Colin Mochrie, Ryan Stiles	Chris Lee	October 11, 2024	1306	0.54
Games performed: Press Conference, Duet (w/Chris Lee), Party Quirks, Scenes from a Hat, Greatest Hits
426	11	Wayne Brady, Brad Sherwood, Colin Mochrie, Ryan Stiles	none	October 18, 2024	1310	0.39
Games performed: Party Quirks, Hoedown, Sound Effects (w/audience members), Scenes from a Hat, Greatest Hits
427	12	Wayne Brady, Jonathan Mangum, Colin Mochrie, Ryan Stiles	Tiffany Coyne	October 18, 2024	1302	0.42
Games performed: Dating App, Deleted Scenes, Dubbing (w/Tiffany Coyne), Props, Scenes from a Hat
428	13	Wayne Brady, Gary Anthony Williams, Colin Mochrie, Ryan Stiles	Lauren Cohan	October 25, 2024	1312	0.31
Games performed: Hollywood Director, Duet (w/Lauren Cohan), Scenes from a Hat, Greatest Hits
429	14	Wayne Brady, Jeff Davis, Colin Mochrie, Ryan Stiles	none	October 25, 2024	1314	0.35
Games performed: Questions with Hats, Weird Newscasters, Film Dub, Scenes from a Hat, Greatest Hits
430	15	Wayne Brady, Brad Sherwood, Colin Mochrie, Ryan Stiles	Grace Byers	November 1, 2024	1308	0.47
Games performed: Weird Newscasters, Whose Line, Themed Restaurant (w/Grace Byers), Party Quirks, Greatest Hits
431	16	Wayne Brady, Greg Proops, Colin Mochrie, Ryan Stiles	none	November 1, 2024	1309	0.45
Games performed: Weird Newscasters, Sound Effects (w/audience members), Newsflash, Scenes from a Hat, Greatest Hits
