= Whose Line Is It Anyway? (American TV series) season 18 =

Whose Line Is It Anyway?
- Season 18
- Starring: Aisha Tyler; Ryan Stiles; Colin Mochrie; Wayne Brady
- No. of episodes: 10

Release
- Original network: The CW
- Original release: October 9, 2021 – April 9, 2022

Season chronology
- ← Previous; Season 17 Next → Season 19

The eighteenth season of the American television series Whose Line Is It Anyway? premiered on The CW on October 9, 2021, and concluded on April 9, 2022.

== Production ==
On May 25, 2021, it was announced that the series would air new episodes on Saturdays for a new season in October 2021. On June 15, 2021, it was announced that the new season would premiere on October 9, 2021.

== Cast ==
=== Main ===
- Aisha Tyler
- Ryan Stiles
- Colin Mochrie
- Wayne Brady

=== Recurring ===
- Heather Anne Campbell (two episodes)
- Keegan-Michael Key (two episodes)
- Jeff Davis (two episodes)
- Jonathan Mangum (two episodes)
- Nyima Funk (one episode)
- Greg Proops (one episode)

== Episodes ==
The "winner(s)" of each episode – as chosen by host Aisha Tyler – are highlighted in italics. The winner(s) perform a sketch during the credit roll, just like in the original British series.

No. overall	No. in season	Performers	Special guest	Original release date	Prod. code	U.S. viewers (millions)
370	1	Wayne Brady, Heather Anne Campbell, Colin Mochrie, Ryan Stiles	Kevin McHale	October 9, 2021	1001	0.61
Games performed: Let's Make a Date, Props, Forward Rewind, Three-Headed Broadway Star (w/Kevin McHale), Greatest Hits
371	2	Wayne Brady, Jeff Davis, Colin Mochrie, Ryan Stiles	Laila Ali	October 9, 2021	1002	0.63
Games performed: Get Down, Scenes from a Hat, Party Quirks, Hoedown, Duet (w/Laila Ali)
372	3	Wayne Brady, Keegan-Michael Key, Colin Mochrie, Ryan Stiles	none	October 16, 2021	1003	0.61
Games performed: Let's Make a Date, Sound Effects (with Audience Members), Forward Rewind, Greatest Hits
373	4	Wayne Brady, Heather Anne Campbell, Colin Mochrie, Ryan Stiles	none	October 23, 2021	1004	0.42
Games performed: Hollywood Director, Sound Effects (with Audience Members), Questions with Hats, Scenes from a Hat, Greatest Hits
374	5	Wayne Brady, Nyima Funk, Colin Mochrie, Ryan Stiles	Shawn Johnson	November 6, 2021	1006	0.60
Games performed: Weird Newscasters, Song Styles (w/Shawn Johnson), Forward Rewind, Scenes from a Hat, Greatest Hits
375	6	Wayne Brady, Greg Proops, Colin Mochrie, Ryan Stiles	none	November 13, 2021	1010	0.65
Games performed: Hollywood Director, Film Dub, Doo-Wop, Infomercial, World's Worst, Greatest Hits
376	7	Wayne Brady, Keegan-Michael Key, Colin Mochrie, Ryan Stiles	none	November 20, 2021	1007	0.60
Games performed: Weird Newscasters, Scenes from a Hat, Newsflash, Party Quirks, Greatest Hits
377	8	Wayne Brady, Jonathan Mangum, Colin Mochrie, Ryan Stiles	none	January 8, 2022	1009	0.67
Games performed: Let’s Make a Date, Radio Show, Scenes from a Hat, Greatest Hits
378	9	Wayne Brady, Jeff Davis, Colin Mochrie, Ryan Stiles	none	January 15, 2022	1005	0.48
Games performed: Let's Make a Date, Sound Effects (with Audience Members), Newsflash, Scenes from a Hat, Greatest Hits
379	10	Wayne Brady, Jonathan Mangum, Colin Mochrie, Ryan Stiles	Kyle Richards	April 9, 2022	1008	0.57
Games performed: Forward Rewind, Scenes from a Hat, Duet (w/Kyle Richards), Sound Effects (with audience members), Greatest Hits
