= Sirens of TI =

Stage show in Las Vegas (2003–2013)

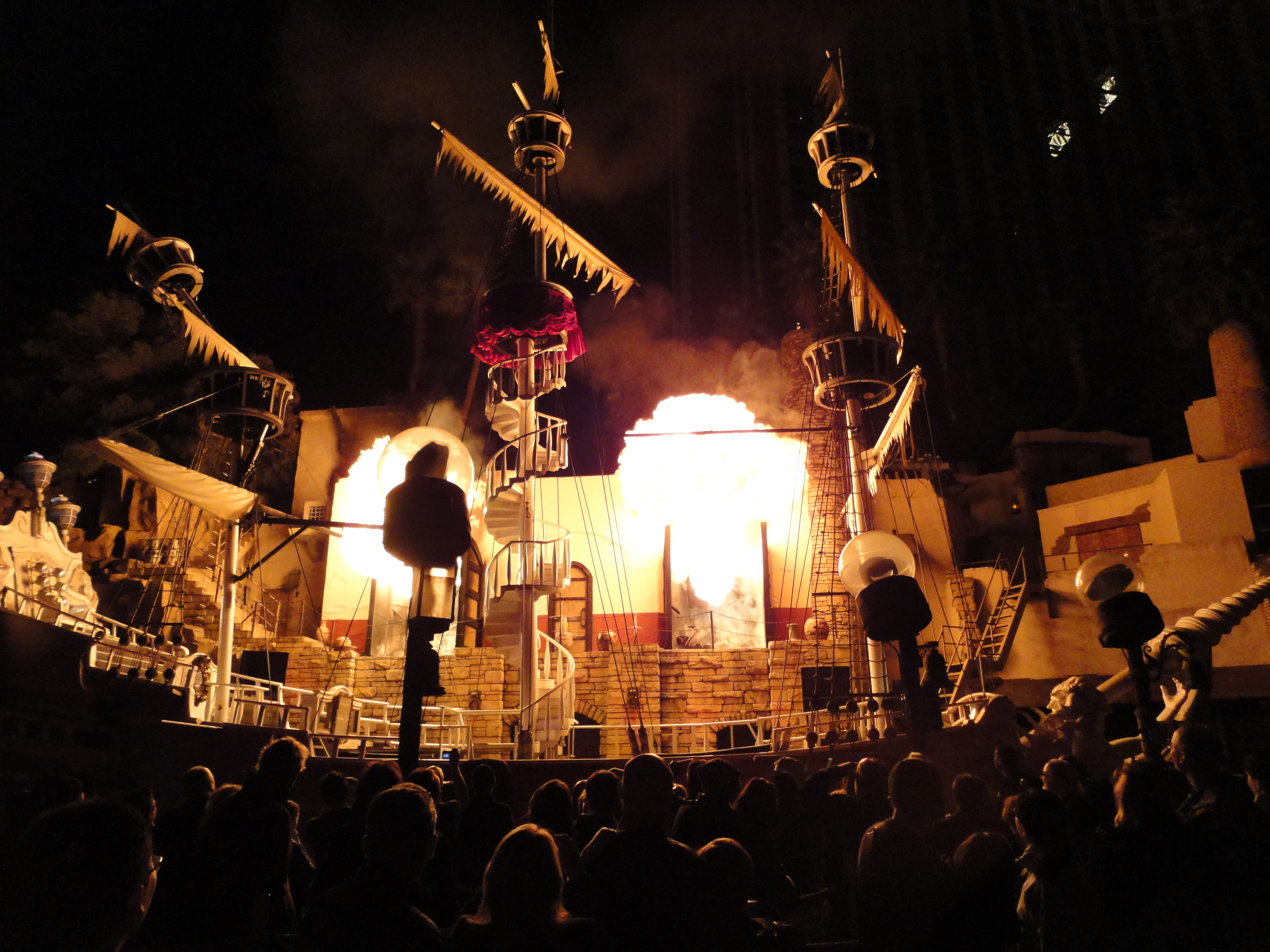
- Pyrotechnics at a 2012 Sirens of TI show
- Show type: Casino show
- Date of premiere: October 26, 2003
- Final show: October 19, 2013
- Location: Treasure Island Hotel and Casino

Creative team
- Director: Kenny Ortega
- Score: Emilio Estefan
- Choreography: Travis Payne
- Notable performers: Amanda Avila, Tiffany Coyne, AnnaLynne McCord

Other information
- Address: 3300 South Las Vegas Boulevard
- Cost: Free

The Sirens of TI was a free nightly show provided by the Treasure Island Hotel and Casino on the Las Vegas Strip in Paradise, Nevada. The show entailed a group of sensual and tempting sirens engaging with a band of renegade pirates led by the infamous Blackbeard. The show closed in 2013.

== Story ==
The show opens with Siren leader "Sin" Cinnamon narrating a warning about their power over the sea. Soon afterwards, the adventuring pirate Eros boards the Siren ship The Song, after which he is discovered and overwhelmed by its crew. Eros is bound to the mast and demands his release, threatening the Sirens with the wrath of Captain Mack.

Mack and the pirate crew from The Bull sail into Sirens' Cove to rescue Eros. The Sirens exchange greetings with the "salty crew" of The Bull and Eros asks his crewmates to leave, as he is happy with his new arrangement. The pirates first fire a warning shot across the bow of The Song, and then fire on the warehouse behind the Sirens' ship, which holds their closet. In retaliation, the Sirens use their power over the ocean to summon a storm to engulf The Bull and sink it to the bottom of the sea.

As The Bull sinks, Captain Mack orders his crew to abandon ship and vows vengeance. The Sirens force Eros to walk the plank, but he and the rest of the pirates soon climb aboard The Song, where a second battle ensues. As the pirates finally realize they're no match for the Sirens, they decide to surrender and the deck of The Song turns into a 21st-century party.

== History ==
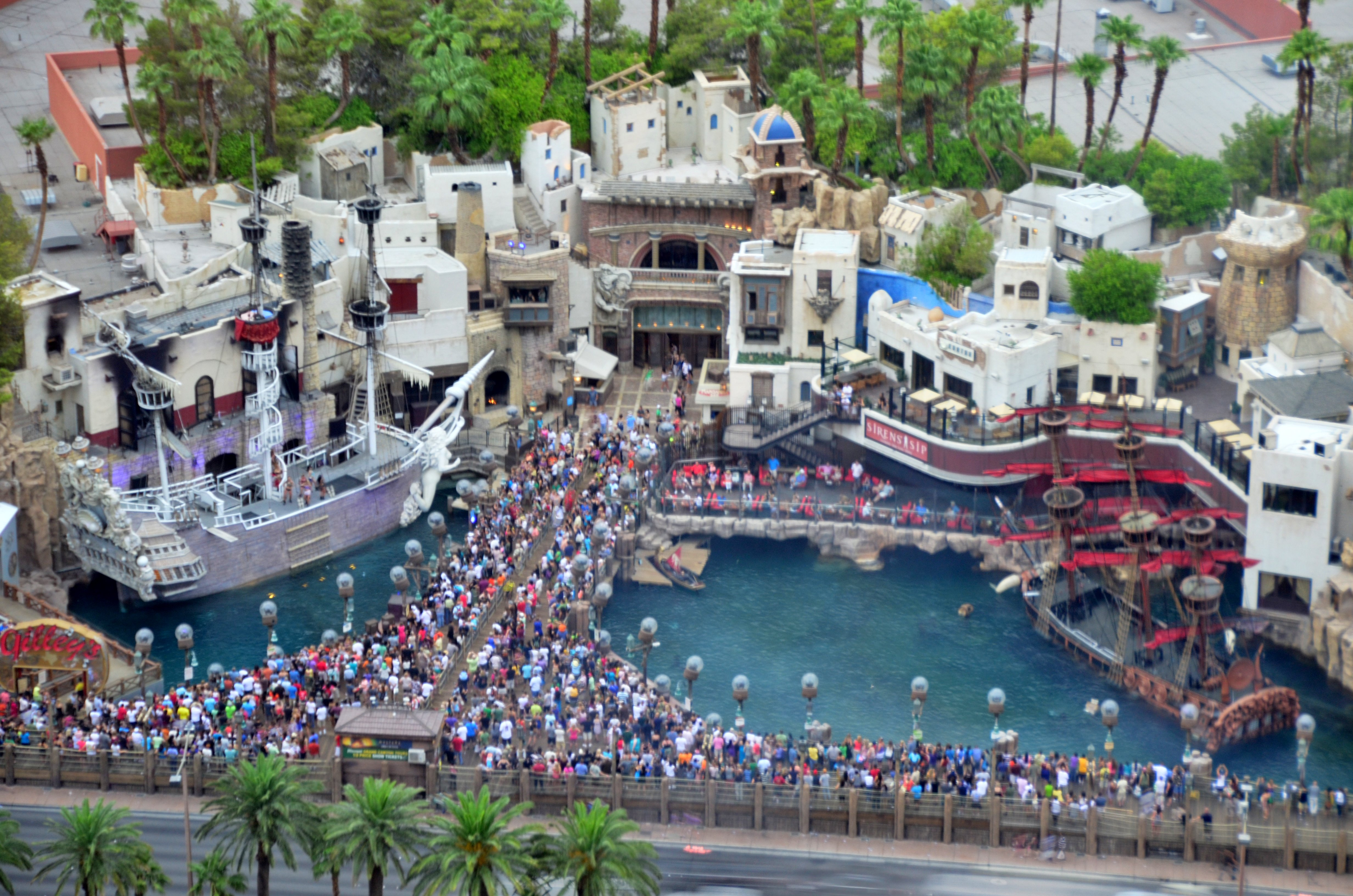
Aerial view from The Venetian, July 2011. The Song (Sirens' ship) is on the left and The Bull (pirate ship) is on the right, separated by a plank pier/walkway

In October 2003, The Sirens of TI replaced The Battle of Buccaneer Bay, which was geared towards a younger audience and had been playing 16,334 shows since Treasure Island opened on October 27, 1993. Director and choreographer Kenny Ortega created The Sirens of TI show, inspired by Homer's Odyssey. Songwriter Emilio Estefan prepared the score and Travis Payne handled show choreography.

The show commemorated its fifth anniversary on October 21, 2008, when the street leading into the hotel/casino property was renamed from "Buccaneer Boulevard" to "Sirens Cove Boulevard." At that time, the show was presented four times daily, at 7, 8:30, 10 and 11:30 p.m. Beginning November 3, 2008, the show was presented at 5:30, 7, 8:30 and 10 p.m. daily.

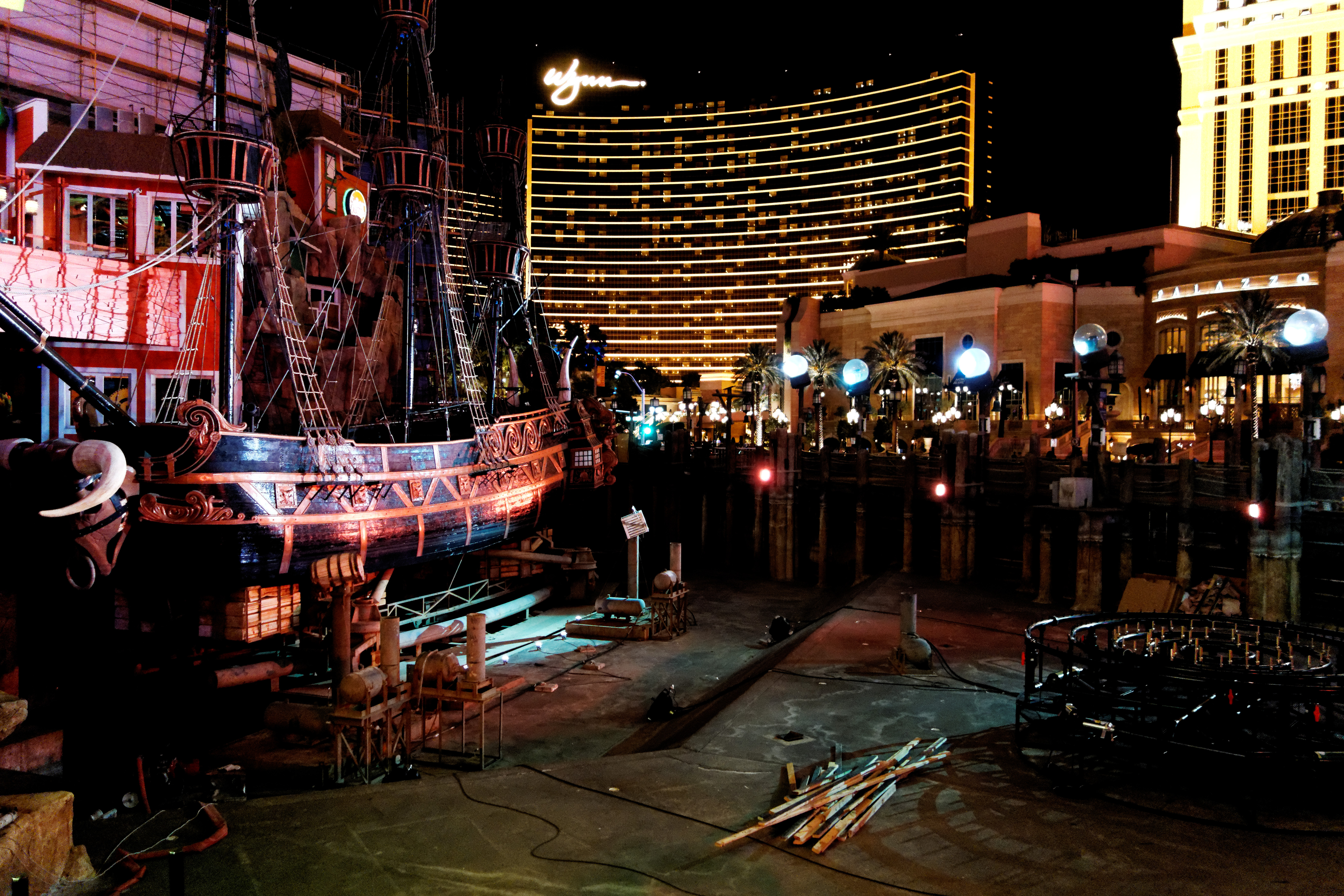
Siren Cove is drained but the boats remain in June 2014

On October 20, 2013, the show was halted for what was intended to be a temporary closure until December 26, for the construction of retail space nearby. However, in late November 2013, Treasure Island announced that the closure was permanent, and that some of the space would be used for new shops, surprising several cast members. The new shopping mall reduced the size of Sirens Cove by approximately one-third, and while the ships still exist, the Bull no longer moves (The Song never moved). The cove now features several water fountains, and no show replaced the Sirens of TI.

=== Statistics ===
The show featured a cast of 16 sirens and 14 pirates. When it started, the cast consisted of 13 sirens and 11 pirates. It was estimated to cost $5 million per year.

More than 80 individual pieces of pyrotechnics were shot per show. Flame effects consumed 7 US gallons (26 L) of liquid propane per show. The sound system had more than 40,000 watts of power. The lagoon contained approximately 1,500,000 US gallons (5,700,000 L) of reverse-osmosis filtered and reclaimed water, which was 10 feet (3.0 m) deep at many points, extending to depths of 25 and 45 feet (7.6 and 13.7 m) at two pits. By 2011, over the course of 7,440 shows, 630,000 pieces of pyrotechnics had been detonated, 52,000 US gallons (200,000 L) of propane had been fired, and The Bull had traveled 480 miles (770 km) (The Song never moved).

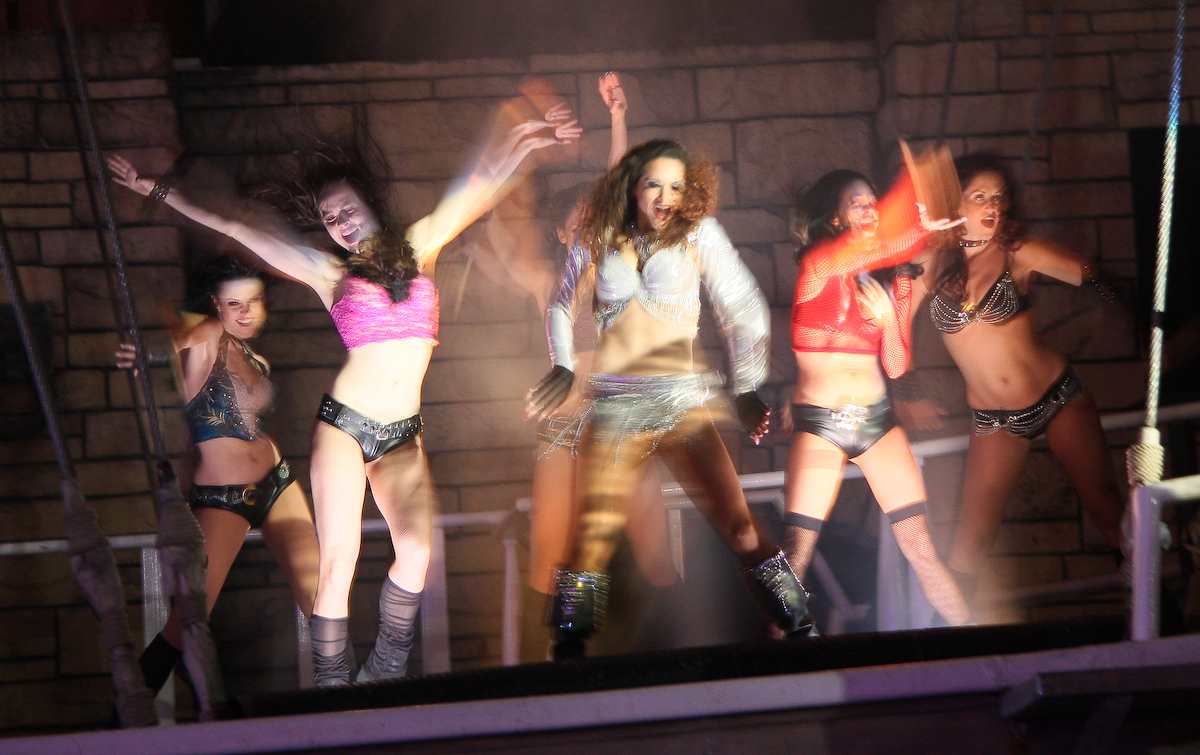
Sirens flank their leader, "Sin" (Jan 2009)

The original runtime for the show was 28 minutes. Dialogue and choreography tweaks shortened it to 18 minutes by 2005 to better match the patience of the standing crowd. The attendance for the premiere showing at 6 p.m. on October 26, 2003, was estimated at 5,000, double the standing capacity of 2,500; during the premiere, the crowd spilled from the sidewalk onto Las Vegas Boulevard, forcing the closure of several lanes. It had been viewed by more than 10 million over 4,749 performances by 2008, and nearly 17 million over 7,440 performances by 2011.

== Reception ==
Soon after its premiere, Martin Stein wrote "Sirens is foundering and taking on water" in his review for the Las Vegas Weekly, adding "the choreography is boring [and] all the action is far too small for a show in which the audience will often be across six lanes of traffic." Readers of the Las Vegas Review-Journal voted it the worst local attraction in 2004 and 2005. The Los Angeles Times advised readers to avoid the show, calling it "dumb and a major pain to watch." Despite the negative feedback, the Las Vegas Weekly later collectively named "Sirens" and its pirate show predecessor "Buccaneer Cove" the 8th-greatest attraction in Las Vegas history in 2017. It was also named a "must-see" by Michelin.

== Notable performers ==
- Amanda Avila, American Idol contestant (season 4)
- Tiffany Coyne, model
- AnnaLynne McCord, actress

== Gallery ==
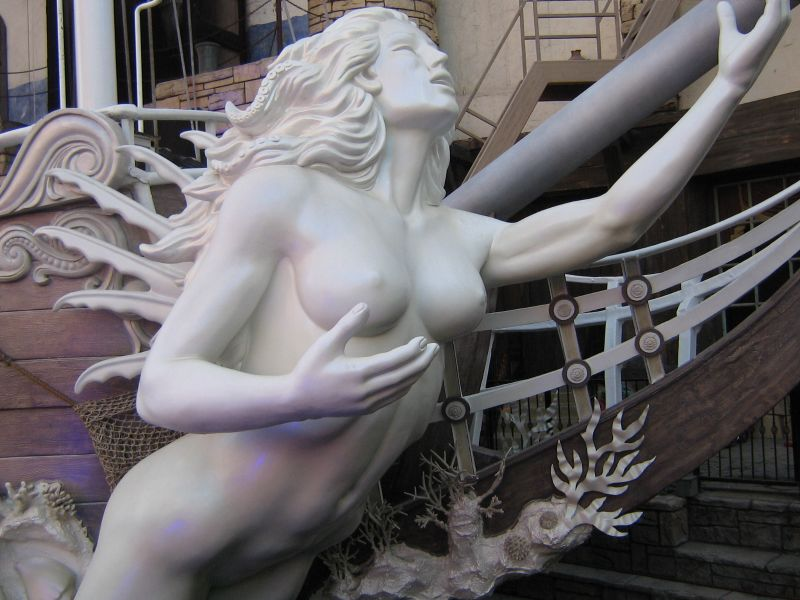
Figurehead of The Song (June 2007)

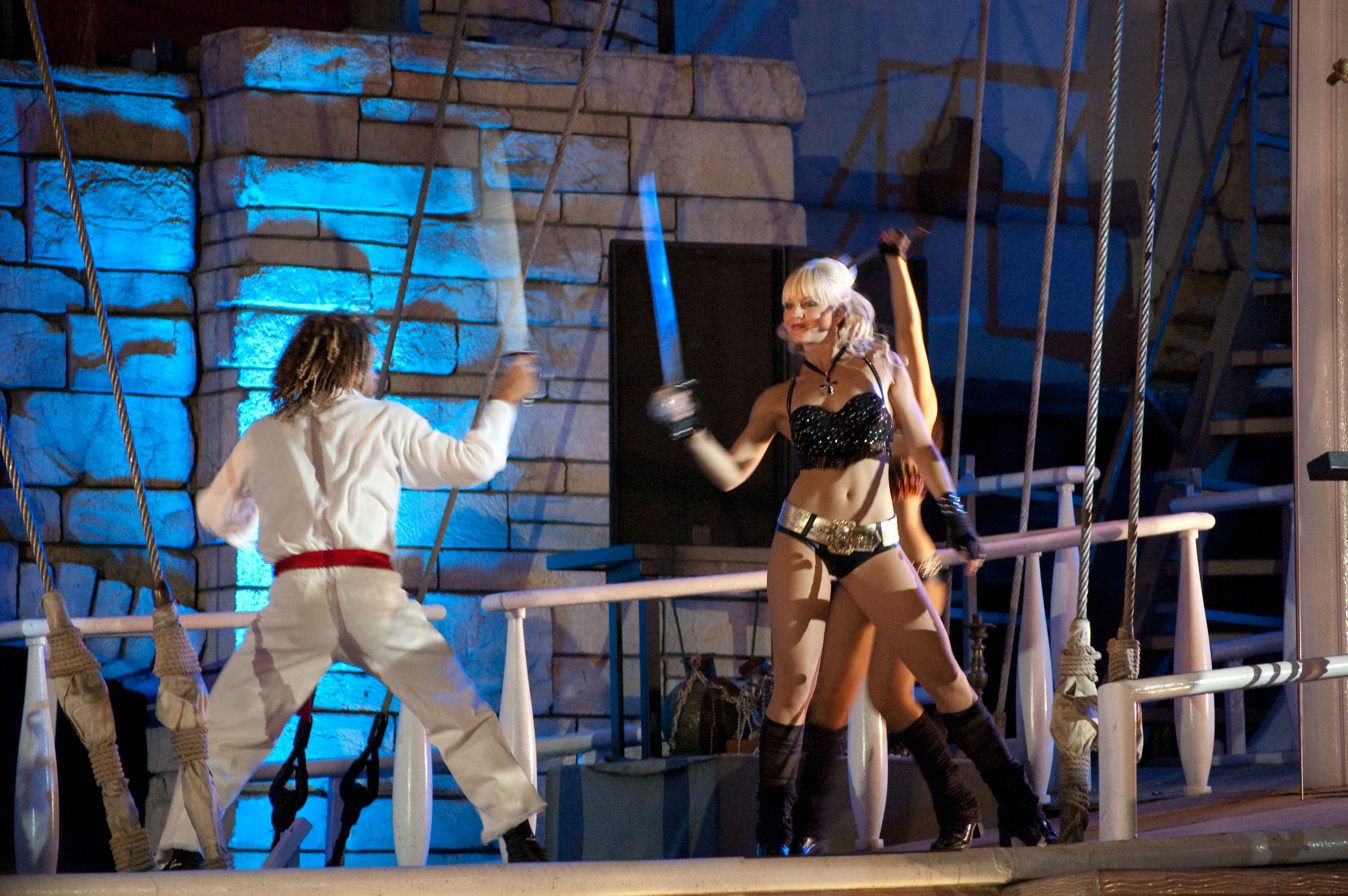
Eros battles a siren after boarding The Song (May 2009)

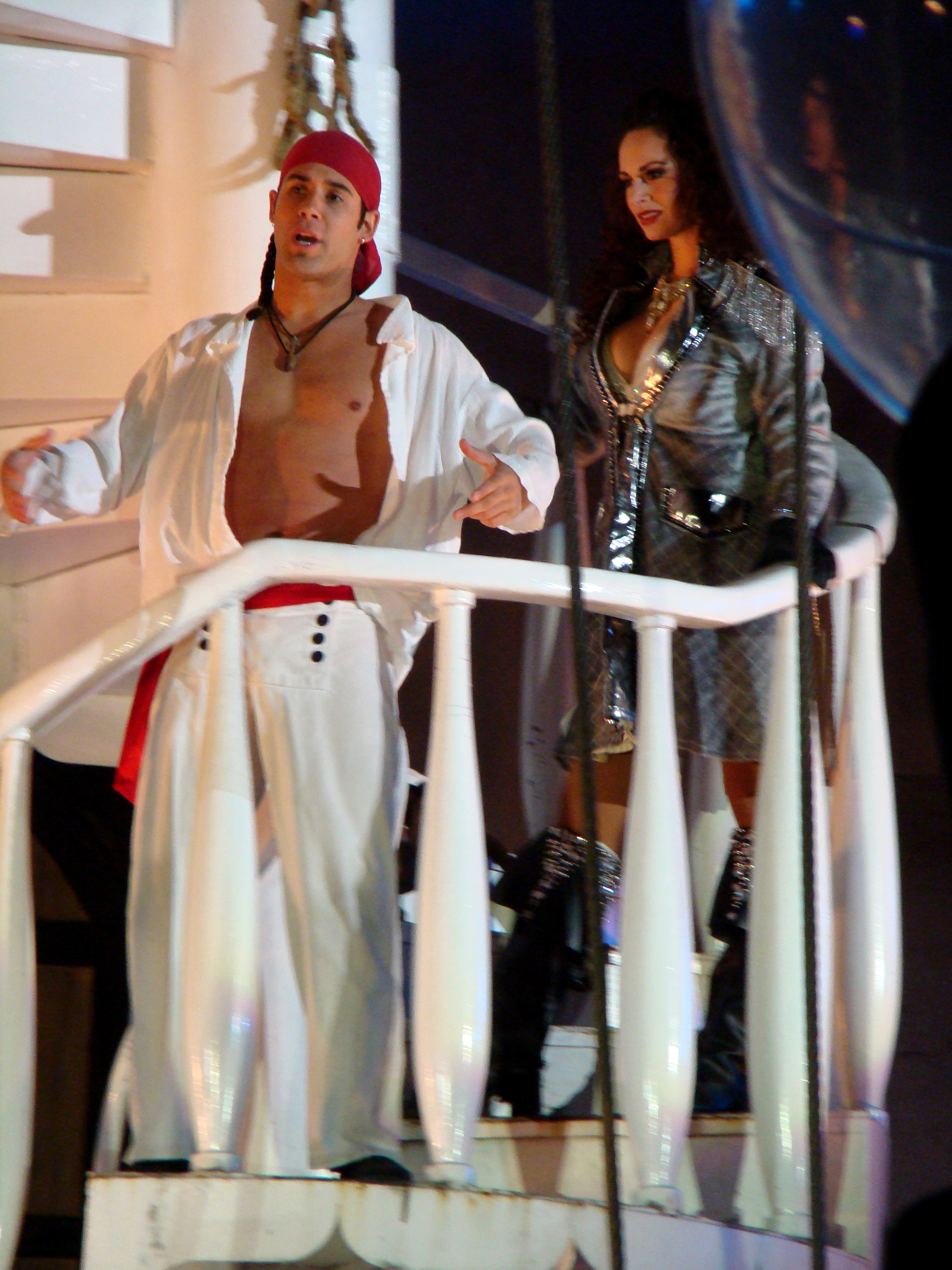
Eros is captured by Sin (Jan 2008)

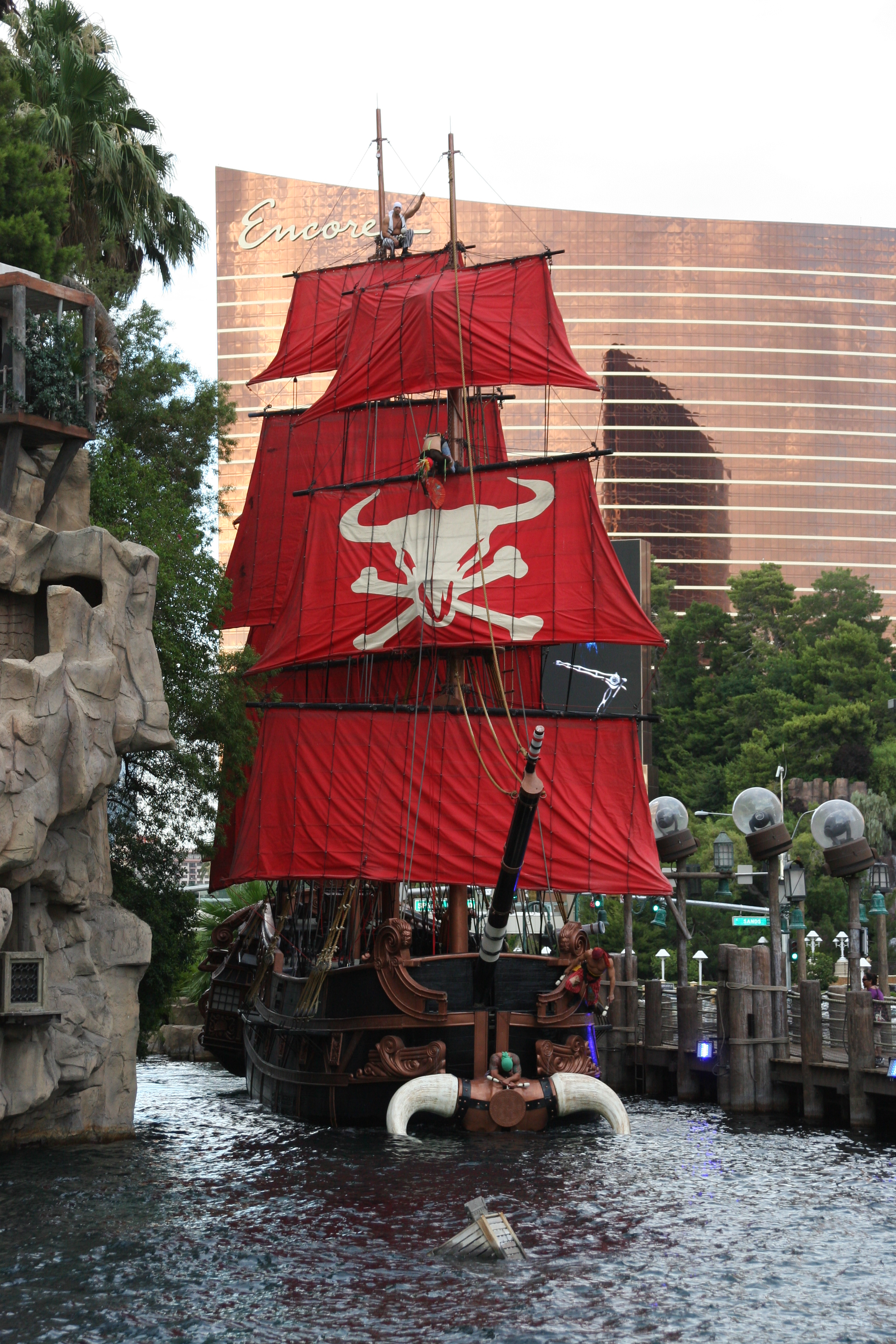
The Bull approaches Sirens Cove (July 2010)

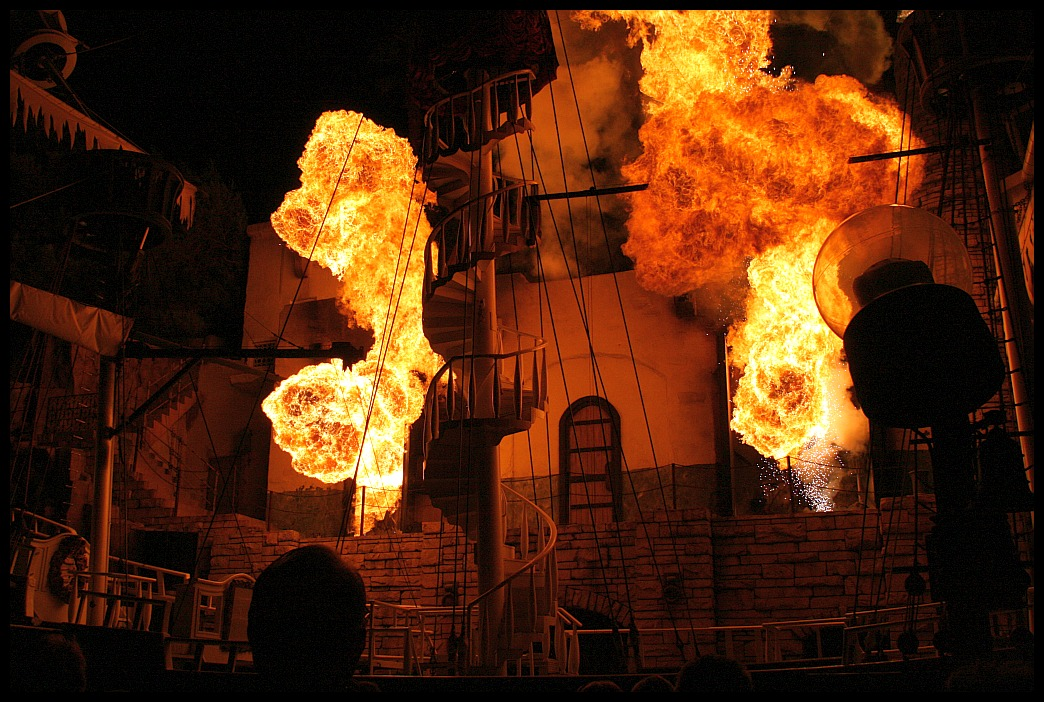
The pirates strike the sirens' closet (June 2007)

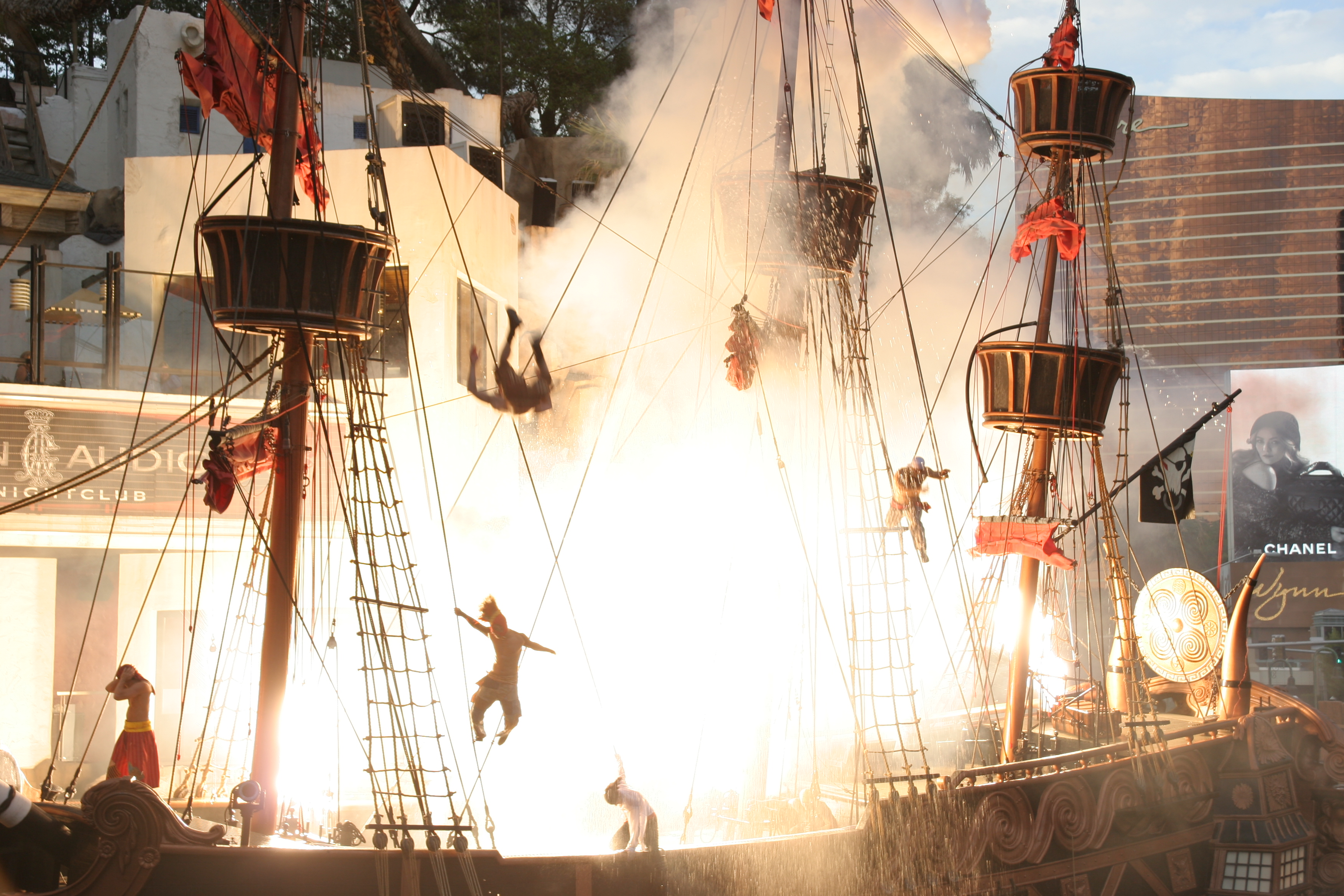
The stricken Bull explodes (July 2010)

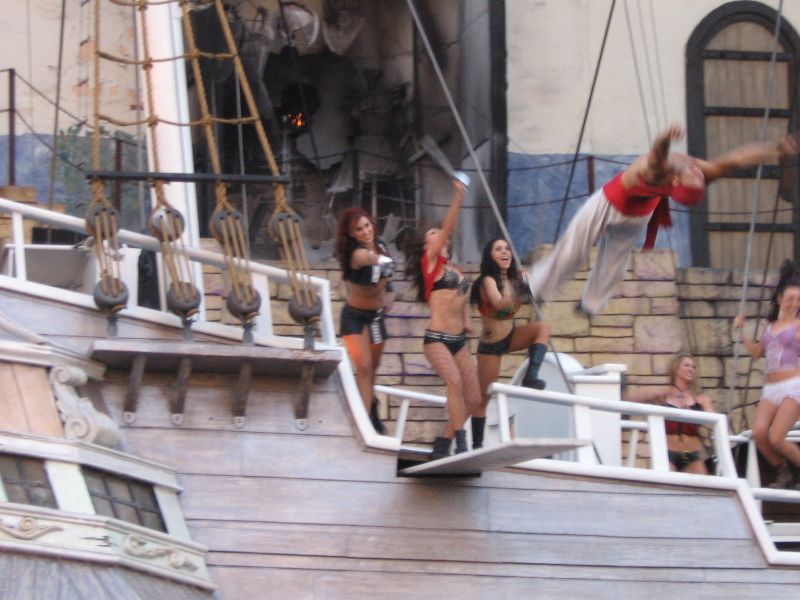
Eros walks the plank (June 2007)

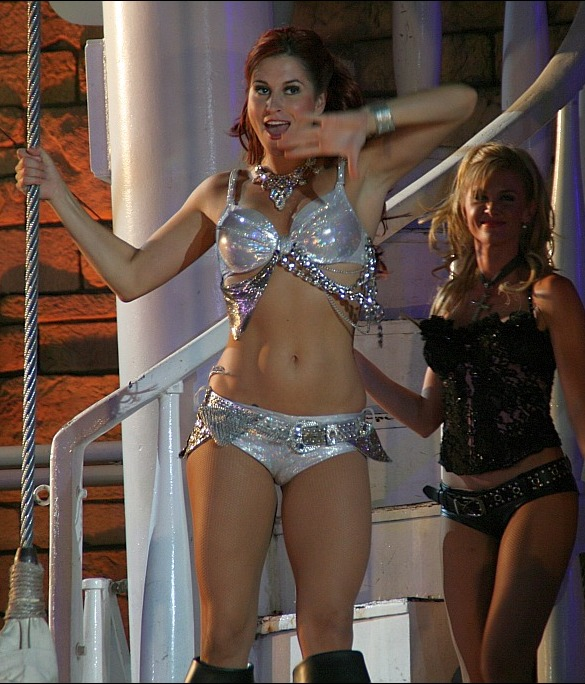
Sin and siren (June 2007)

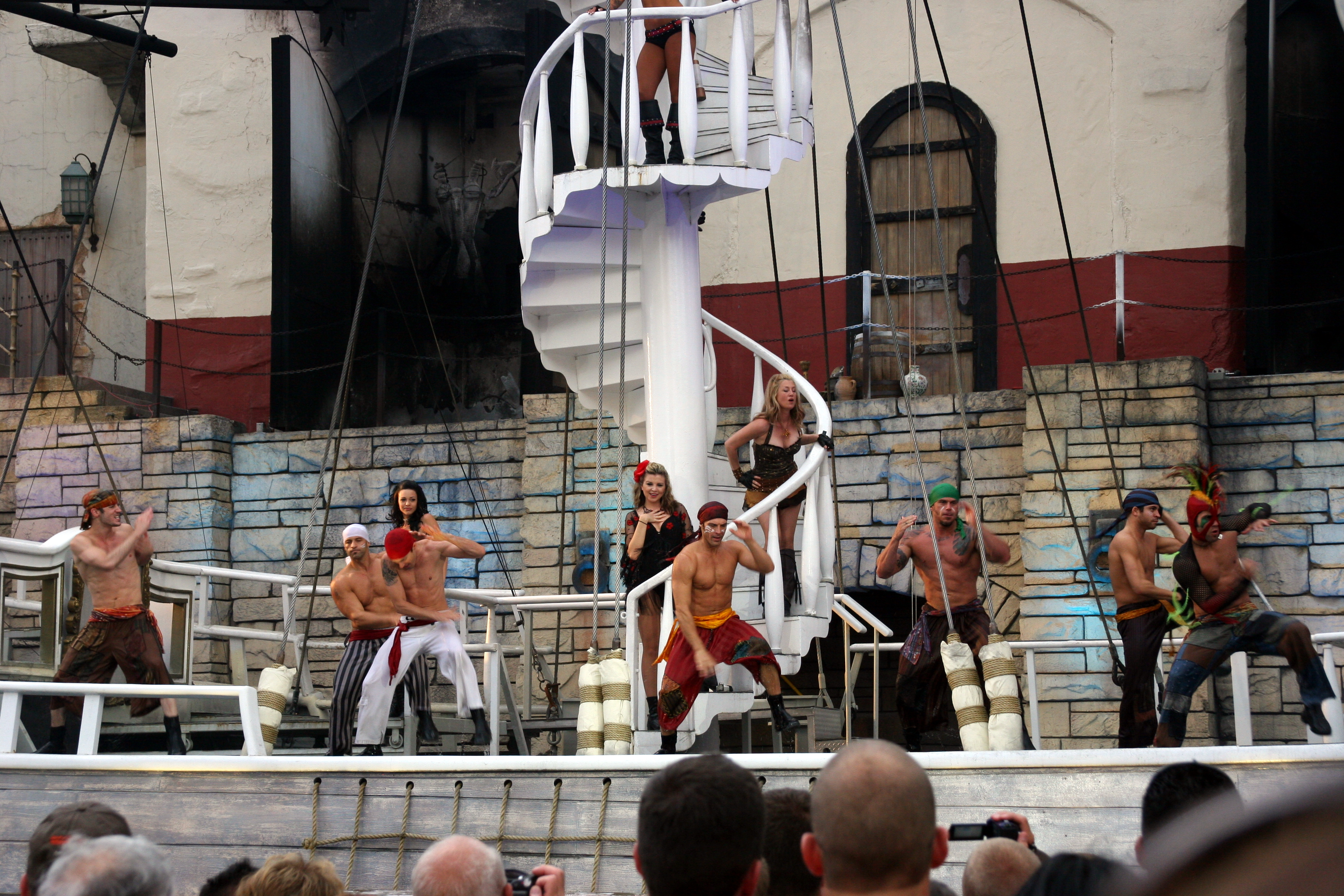
One last battle (July 2010)

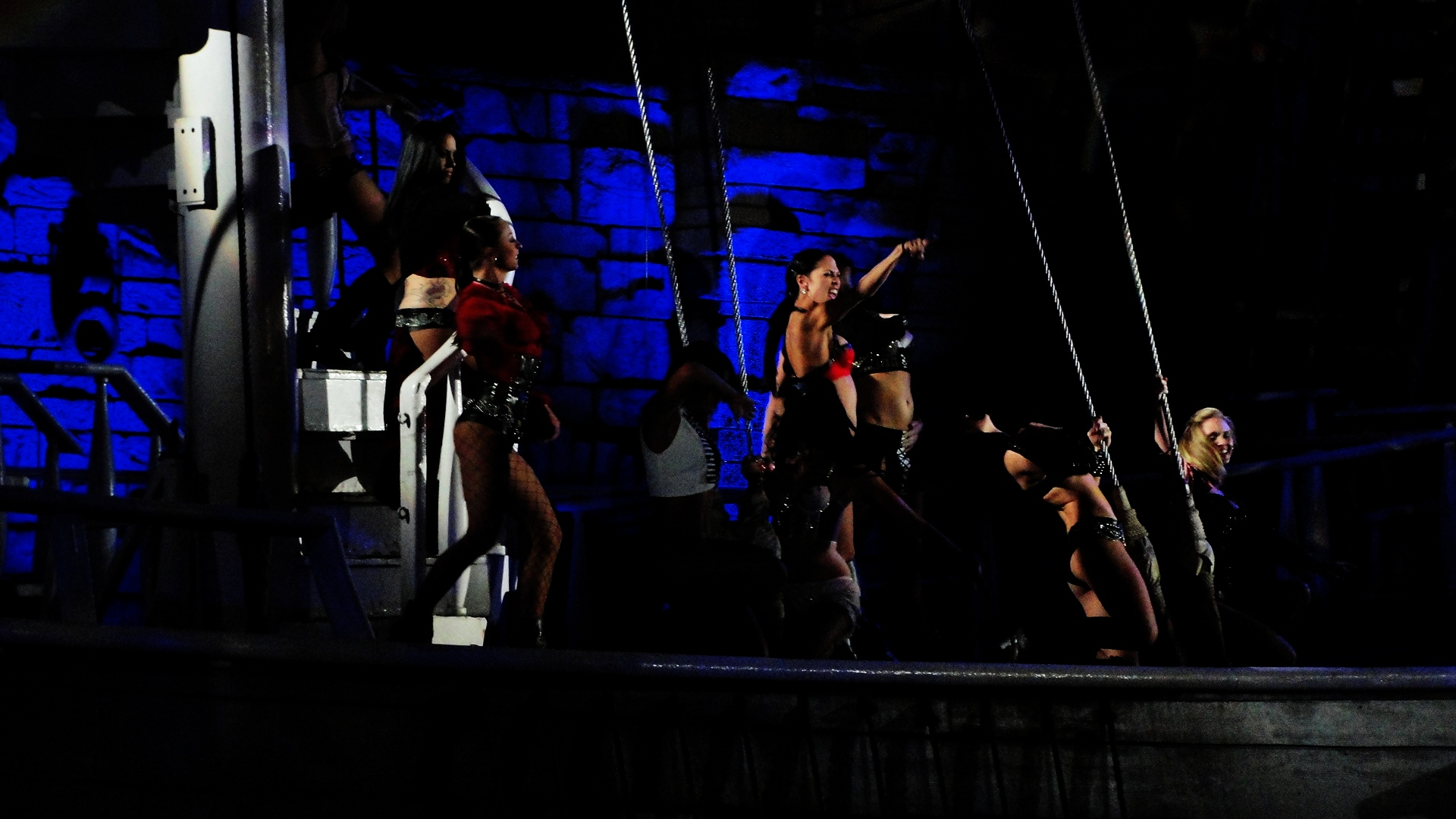
Victorious sirens (Oct 2009)

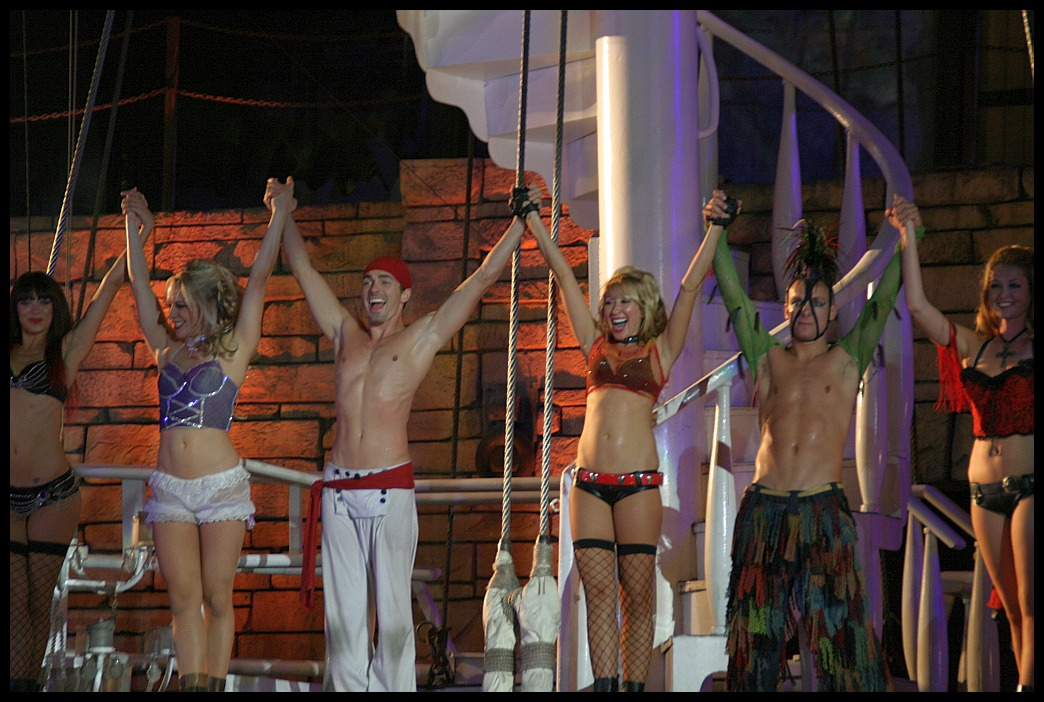
Performers acknowledge the audience (June 2007)

== See also ==
- Jubilee!
- Absinthe
- Peepshow
- Moulin Rouge
- Le Lido
- Folies Bergère
- Casino de Paris
- Paradis Latin
- Cabaret Red Light
- Tropicana Club
