= Whose Line Is It Anyway? (American TV series) season 19 =

Whose Line Is It Anyway?
- Season 19
- Starring: Aisha Tyler; Ryan Stiles; Colin Mochrie; Wayne Brady
- No. of episodes: 14

Release
- Original network: The CW
- Original release: October 14, 2022 – March 24, 2023

Season chronology
- ← Previous; Season 18 Next → Season 20

The nineteenth season of the American television series Whose Line Is It Anyway? premiered on The CW on October 14, 2022, and concluded on March 24, 2023.

== Production ==
On May 19, 2022, it was announced that the series would air new episodes on Fridays for a new season in October 2022. On July 5, 2022, it was announced that the new season would premiere on October 14, 2022.

== Cast ==
=== Main ===
- Aisha Tyler
- Ryan Stiles (absent from episode 3)
- Colin Mochrie
- Wayne Brady (absent from episode 10)

=== Recurring ===
- Gary Anthony Williams (five episodes)
- Jeff Davis (three episodes)
- Jonathan Mangum (two episodes)
- Greg Proops (two episodes)
- Brad Sherwood (two episodes)
- Heather Anne Campbell (one episode)
- Nyima Funk (one episode)

== Episodes ==
The "winner(s)" of each episode – as chosen by host Aisha Tyler – are highlighted in italics. The winner(s) perform a sketch during the credit roll, just like in the original British series.

No. overall	No. in season	Performers	Special guest	Original release date	Prod. code	U.S. viewers (millions)
380	1	Wayne Brady, Jonathan Mangum, Colin Mochrie, Ryan Stiles	none	October 14, 2022	1111	0.45
Games performed: Sound Effects (with audience members), Scenes from a Hat, Radio Show, Irish Drinking Song, Greatest Hits
381	2	Wayne Brady, Heather Anne Campbell, Colin Mochrie, Ryan Stiles	Padma Lakshmi	October 21, 2022	1101	0.60
Games performed: Let's Make a Date, Dubbing (w/Padma Lakshmi), World's Worst, Greatest Hits
382	3	Wayne Brady, Jeff Davis, Colin Mochrie, Greg Proops	Darren Criss	October 28, 2022	1108	0.47
Games performed: Scenes from a Hat, Duet (w/Darren Criss), Award Show, Hoedown, Three Headed Broadway Star (w/Darren Criss)
383	4	Wayne Brady, Gary Anthony Williams, Colin Mochrie, Ryan Stiles	none	November 4, 2022	1103	0.61
Games performed: Let's Make a Date, Multiple Personalities, Weird Newscasters, Scenes from a Hat, Greatest Hits
384	5	Wayne Brady, Jeff Davis, Colin Mochrie, Ryan Stiles	none	November 11, 2022	1105	0.50
Games performed: Weird Newscasters, Infomercial, Doo-Wop, Scenes from a Hat, Greatest Hits
385	6	Wayne Brady, Gary Anthony Williams, Colin Mochrie, Ryan Stiles	none	November 18, 2022	1110	0.51
Games performed: Hollywood Director, What's in the Bag, Two-Line Vocabulary, Scenes from a Hat, Greatest Hits
386	7	Wayne Brady, Brad Sherwood, Colin Mochrie, Ryan Stiles	none	December 3, 2022	1102	0.50
Games performed: Hollywood Director, Sound Effects (with Audience Members), Party Quirks, Hoedown, Scenes from a Hat
387	8	Wayne Brady, Gary Anthony Williams, Colin Mochrie, Ryan Stiles	none	December 9, 2022	1112	0.54
Games performed: Hollywood Director, Sound Effects (with Audience Members), Newsflash, Scenes from a Hat, Greatest Hits
388	9	Wayne Brady, Gary Anthony Williams, Colin Mochrie, Ryan Stiles	none	February 17, 2023	1107	0.58
Games performed: Scenes from a Hat, Sound Effects (With Audience Members), Newsflash, Props, Greatest Hits
389	10	Brad Sherwood, Jeff Davis, Colin Mochrie, Ryan Stiles	none	February 24, 2023	1113	0.55
Games performed: Scenes from a Hat, Secret, Kick-it, Props, Greatest Hits
390	11	Wayne Brady, Nyima Funk, Colin Mochrie, Ryan Stiles	Maggie Q	March 3, 2023	1106	0.50
Games performed: Let's Make a Date, Sound Effects (With Audience Members), Song Styles (w/Maggie Q), Foreign Movie, Scenes from a Hat
391	12	Wayne Brady, Gary Anthony Williams, Colin Mochrie, Ryan Stiles	none	March 10, 2023	1114	0.50
Games performed: Hollywood Director, Sound Effects (with audience members), Scenes from a Hat, Greatest Hits
392	13	Wayne Brady, Jonathan Mangum, Colin Mochrie, Ryan Stiles	Kearran Giovanni	March 17, 2023	1104	0.55
Games performed: Let's Make a Date, Newsflash, Dubbing (w/Kearran Giovanni), Scenes from a Hat, Greatest Hits
393	14	Wayne Brady, Greg Proops, Colin Mochrie, Ryan Stiles	none	March 24, 2023	1109	0.45
Games performed: Let's Make A Date, Props, Questions with Hats, Sound Effects (with audience members), Greatest Hits
