= Joel Bergman =

American architect

- Born: August 20, 1936; Los Angeles, California, U.S.
- Died: August 24, 2016 (aged 80)
- Education: University of Southern California
- Occupation: Architect
- Website: bwaltd.com

Joel Bergman (August 20, 1936 – August 24, 2016) was an American architect who has designed several landmark casinos.

Bergman was born in Los Angeles. He graduated from the University of Southern California in 1965.

== Projects ==
=== Stern and Associates ===
In 1968 he joined Martin Stern, Jr.

- Las Vegas Hilton (then called the Hotel International)'
- Kings Castle Resort & Casino, Lake Tahoe, Nevada
- The Cottages at The Kuilima Resort, Oahu, Hawaii
- MGM Grand Hotel & Casino, Reno & Las Vegas, Nevada
- Little America Hotel Tower, Salt Lake City, Utah

=== Atlandia Design (1978–1994) ===
In 1978 he went to work exclusively for Steve Wynn through the firm Atlandia Design. Wynn had a chair adjacent to his drafting table and together they played an important role in transforming the Las Vegas strip from a low rise strip to the modern theme-oriented casino with high rise buildings.

- Golden Nugget Las Vegas - 1977 renovation; 1980 North Tower
- Golden Nugget Atlantic City 1980 original design/in 2009 he is doing renovations for the Atlantic City Hilton (its current name)
- Golden Nugget Laughlin - 1986 renovation
- The Mirage 1989
- Treasure Island Hotel and Casino 1993

=== Bergman Walls & Associates (1994–present) ===
In 1994 he and Scott Walls, who had also worked for Wynn, started their own firm.

- Mystic Lake Casino, Prior Lake, Minnesota 1994
- Caesars Palace (1997 tower)/tower/2004 Convention Hall, Multiple Restaurants, Suites & interior renovation.(1994 thru current)
- Paris Las Vegas 1999
- Sahara Hotel and Casino 1999 renovation/Speedworld addition
- Barona Casino, Lakeside, California 2001
- Resorts Atlantic City (27-story "Rendezvous Tower) opened in 2004
- L'Auberge du Lac Resort, Lake Charles, Louisiana 2005
- MGM Grand Las Vegas (3 38-story towers called the Signature at MGM Grand) built in 2005 and 2006
- Trump Hotel Las Vegas 2008
- Rivers Casino, Pittsburgh, Pennsylvania, primarily built in 2008 and 2009 (opened August 9, 2009)
- Fontainebleau Resort Las Vegas (cancelled during construction)
- Pure Night Club, Las Vegas Nevada (at Caesars Palace) 2005
- River City Casino, St. Louis, Missouri 2007
- Golden Nugget Resort & Casino Riverboat, Lake Charles, Louisiana 2014
- Snoqualmie Casino, Snoqualmie, Washington 2009
- Gilley's Saloon, Dance Hall & BBQ at Treasure Island, Las Vegas, Nevada 2010
- Gaudin Porsche Jaguar, Las Vegas, Nevada 2002
