= Whose Line Is It Anyway? (American TV series) season 17 =

Whose Line Is It Anyway?
- Season 17
- Starring: Aisha Tyler; Ryan Stiles; Colin Mochrie; Wayne Brady
- No. of episodes: 10

Release
- Original network: The CW
- Original release: January 8 – April 16, 2021

Season chronology
- ← Previous; Season 16 Next → Season 18

The seventeenth season of the American television series Whose Line Is It Anyway? premiered on The CW on January 8, 2021, and concluded on April 16, 2021.

== Production ==
On May 14, 2020, it was announced that the series would air new episodes for a new season in January 2021. On October 29, 2020, it was announced that the new season would premiere on January 8, 2021.

== Cast ==
=== Main ===
- Aisha Tyler
- Ryan Stiles
- Colin Mochrie
- Wayne Brady

=== Recurring ===
- Greg Proops (two episodes)
- Jonathan Mangum (two episodes)
- Jeff Davis (two episodes)
- Gary Anthony Williams (two episodes)
- Nyima Funk (one episode)
- Heather Anne Campbell (one episode)

== Episodes ==
The "winner(s)" of each episode – as chosen by host Aisha Tyler – are highlighted in italics. The winner(s) perform a sketch during the credit roll, just like in the original British series.

No. overall	No. in season	Performers	Original release date	Prod. code	U.S. viewers (millions)
360	1	Wayne Brady, Jeff Davis, Colin Mochrie, Ryan Stiles	January 8, 2021	901	0.83
Games Performed: Weird Newscasters, Hoedown, Infomercial, Scenes from a Hat, Greatest Hits
361	2	Wayne Brady, Gary Anthony Williams, Colin Mochrie, Ryan Stiles	January 15, 2021	906	0.85
Games Performed: Let's Make a Date, Doo Wop, Whose Line, Irish Drinking Song, Scenes from a Hat, Greatest Hits
362	3	Wayne Brady, Jonathan Mangum, Colin Mochrie, Ryan Stiles	January 22, 2021	903	0.92
Games Performed: Questions with Hats, World's Worst, Whose Line, Party Quirks, Hoedown, Greatest Hits
363	4	Wayne Brady, Greg Proops, Colin Mochrie, Ryan Stiles	January 29, 2021	907	1.08
Games Performed: Questions with Hats, Film Dub, Scene to Music, Sound Effects (with Audience Members), Scenes from a Hat, Greatest Hits
364	5	Wayne Brady, Nyima Funk, Colin Mochrie, Ryan Stiles	February 5, 2021	905	0.92
Games Performed: Weird Newcasters, Two-Line Vocabulary, Newsflash, Scenes from a Hat, Sideways Scene
365	6	Wayne Brady, Greg Proops, Colin Mochrie, Ryan Stiles	February 19, 2021	902	0.81
Games Performed: Questions with Hats, Doo-Wop, Scenes from a Hat, Whose Line, Hoedown, Greatest Hits
366	7	Wayne Brady, Heather Anne Campbell, Colin Mochrie, Ryan Stiles	February 26, 2021	904	0.87
Games Performed: Hollywood Director, Scenes from a Hat, Party Quirks, Greatest Hits
367	8	Wayne Brady, Jonathan Mangum, Colin Mochrie, Ryan Stiles	March 12, 2021	908	0.81
Games Performed: Hollywood Director, Scenes from a Hat, Sound Effects (with Audience Members), Props, Greatest Hits
368	9	Wayne Brady, Jeff Davis, Colin Mochrie, Ryan Stiles	March 19, 2021	909	0.75
Games Performed: Questions with Hats, Film Dub, Irish Drinking Song, Sound Effects (with Audience Members), Party Quirks, Greatest Hits
369	10	Wayne Brady, Gary Anthony Williams, Colin Mochrie, Ryan Stiles	April 16, 2021	910	0.75
Games Performed: Questions with Hats, Sound Effects (with Audience Members), Film Dub, Scenes from a Hat, Greatest Hits
