= Gilley's Saloon =

Gilley's Saloon, Dancehall and Bar-B-Que

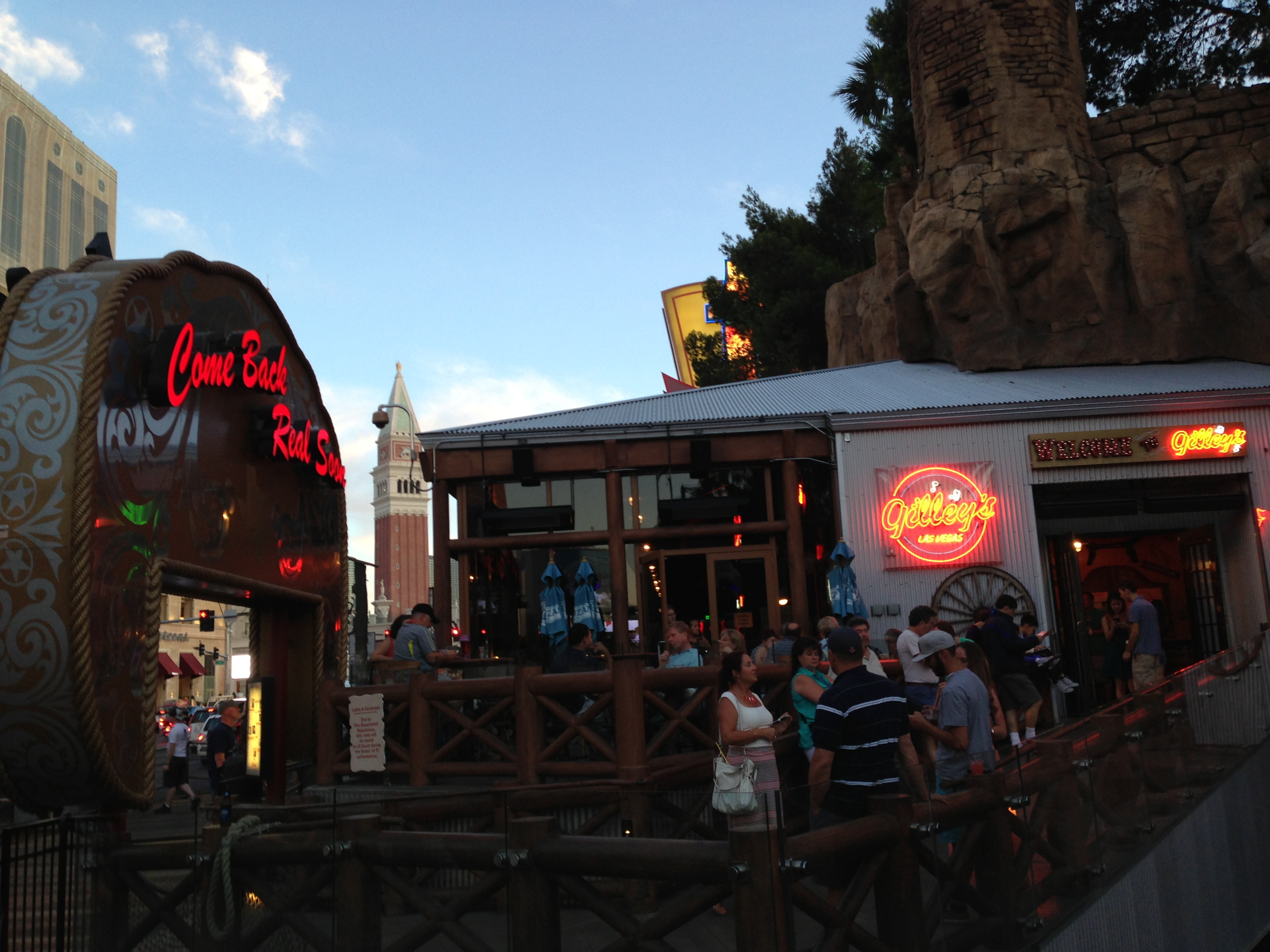
- The co-branded outlet at the Treasure Island Hotel and Casino in Las Vegas in 2013
- Interactive map of Gilley's Saloon, Dancehall and Bar-B-Que

Restaurant information
- Established: 1999
- Owner: Treasure Island Hotel and Casino
- Food type: Barbecue
- Dress code: Casual
- Location: 3300 S Las Vegas Boulevard, Las Vegas, Clark County, Nevada, 89109, United States
- Coordinates: 36.124036°N 115.170617°W
- Seating capacity: 124
- Website: gilleyslasvegas.com

Gilley's Saloon, Dancehall and Bar-B-Que is a restaurant, bar and dance hall in Las Vegas, Nevada in the United States. It serves barbecue and has a Western theme. It is owned by and located at Treasure Island Hotel and Casino on the Las Vegas Strip.

== History ==
Phil Ruffin, owner of Treasure Island Hotel and Casino, opened Gilley's in December 1999 at the New Frontier Hotel and Casino. It was based on Gilley's Club in Texas. Gilley's closed in 2007 when the New Frontier closed.

Ruffin decided, in 2009, to reopen Gilley's. In April 2010, Gilley's reopened on the Las Vegas Strip at Treasure Island.

== Design and ambiance ==
The first Gilley's Saloon, at the New Frontier, had a 14,000-square-foot (1,300 m^{2}) dance floor, live music, and a patio. It offered mud wrestling.

The second Gilley's Saloon is located on the Las Vegas Strip on the Treasure Island property. The dining area includes table service and a bar, seating 124 people in total. The tables are separated from the dance hall by sliding glass walls. There is an open kitchen and a patio that overlooks the Strip. The walls are made of wood planks. There is a gift shop selling Western-themed merchandise.

The dance hall has live music and DJs playing country and rock music. There are two bars inside the dance hall. One of the bars includes eight bar stools with custom made saddles for seats. The parquet dance floor is approximately 1,000 square feet (93 m^{2}) in size. Line dancing lessons are offered. There is a mechanical bull game. The bar has contests for men ("Toughest Cowboy") and women ("Bikini Bull Riding") using the mechanical bull. It also has karaoke.

Servers include "Gilley Girls" – women wearing black bikinis, chaps, cowboy boots and cowboy hats. Gilley's Girls are hired through casting calls, which include dance routines. They perform country music-themed dance routines in the dance hall and perform tricks on the mechanical bull.

== Cuisine and cocktails ==
Gilley's serves American style barbecue that the Las Vegas Sun describes as "rustic," and other American dishes. The menu includes fried chicken, hamburgers, hot links, chili, brisket, pulled pork, and ribs. The restaurant serves a giant pretzel with a side of mustard made with Crown Royal. The beef brisket is smoked for up to 12 hours. They use a mesquite pit to smoke their barbecue. Veggie burgers and vegan food is also on the menu. Arturo Reyes is the head chef.

The bar has draft beer and cocktails. Cocktails include the Bikini Bull Rider, Tequila Makes Her Clothes Fall Off, The Devil's Rope, and The Gilley Up. They have a menu of alcohol-based iced tea and lemonades. Gilley's serves beer in a 100-US-fluid-ounce (3.0 L) drink tower.

== Reception ==
Frommer's gives Gilley's a 2 out of 3 star rating saying Gilley's is the "only one spot serving real barbecue on the Strip." Time Out rates Gilley's 2 out of 5 stars. It calls Gilley's a "rowdy and rollicking dancehall that serves heaping platters of meat-and-potato meals, slathered in sauce."
