= Treasure Island Hotel and Casino =

Casino hotel in Paradise, Nevada, US

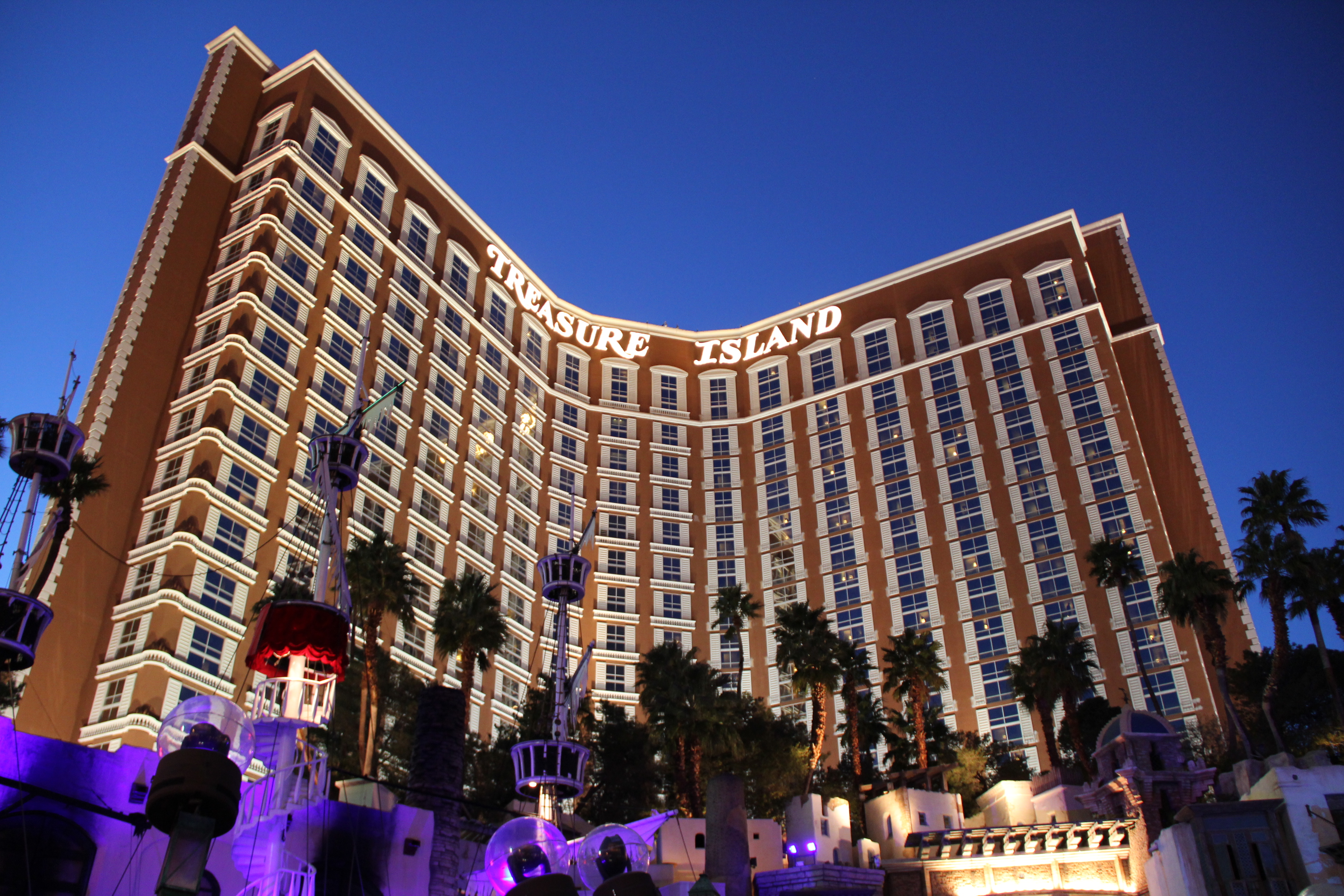

- Location within Las Vegas Strip Location within Nevada
- Interactive map of Treasure Island
- Location: Paradise, Nevada, U.S.; 3300 South Las Vegas Boulevard; 36°07′29″N 115°10′19″W
- Opened: October 26, 1993; 32 years ago
- Theme: Pirates
- No. of rooms: 2,885
- Gaming space: 47,927 sq ft (4,452.6 m^{2})
- Permanent shows: Mystère
- Signature attractions: Marvel Avengers S.T.A.T.I.O.N.
- Notable restaurants: Gilley's Saloon; Señor Frog's; Seafood Shack; Phil's Steak House
- Casino type: Land-based
- Owner: Phil Ruffin
- Architect: Joel Bergman; Jon Jerde
- Renovated in: 1999, 2003, 2019–20
- Website: treasureisland.com

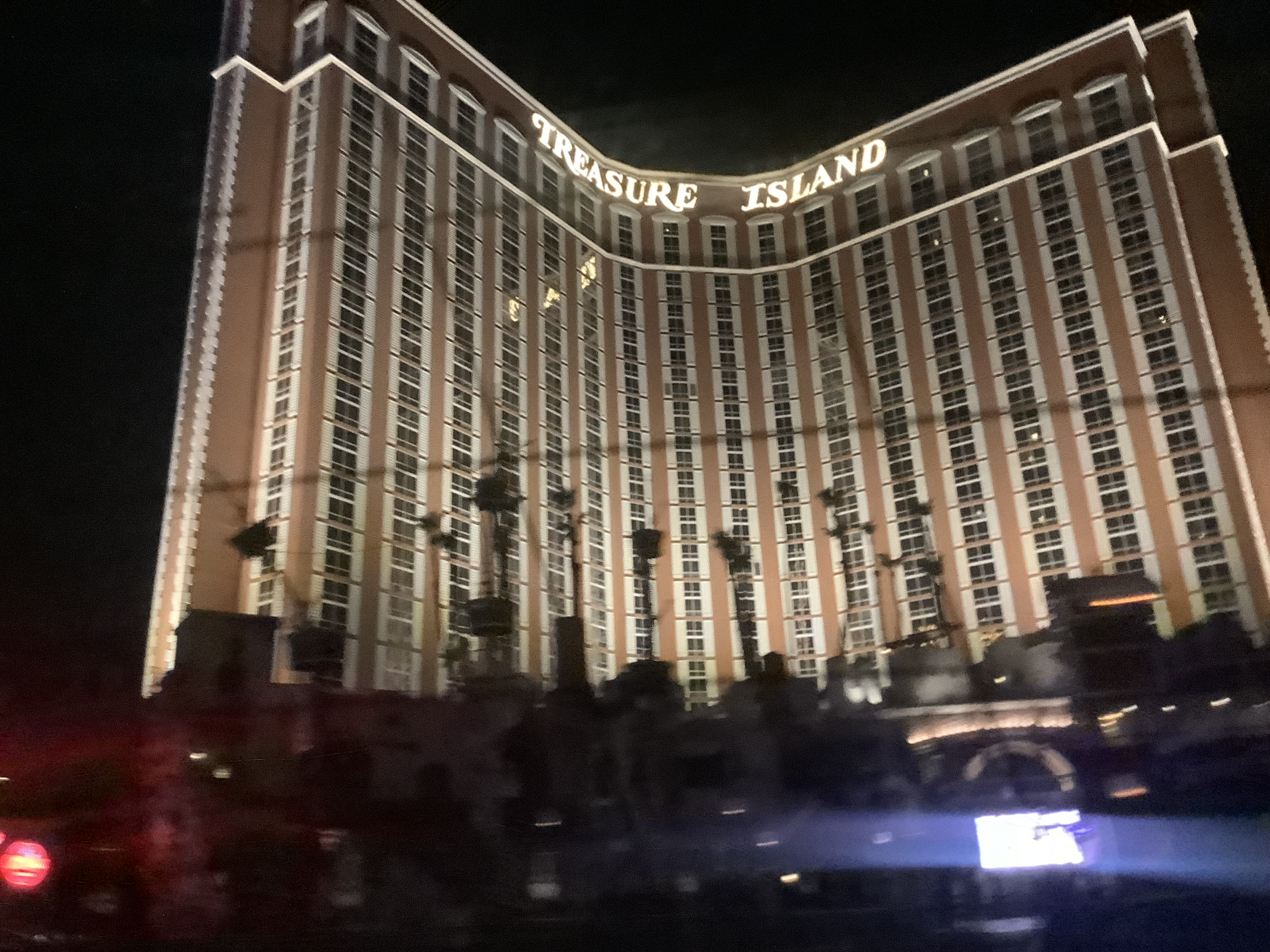
Treasure Island at night in 2025

Treasure Island Hotel and Casino (also known as Treasure Island Las Vegas and "TI") is a pirate-themed hotel and casino located on the Las Vegas Strip in Paradise, Nevada, U.S. It includes 2,885 rooms and a 47,927 sq ft (4,452.6 m^{2}) casino. The resort is owned and operated by businessman Phil Ruffin.

Treasure Island was developed by casino owner Steve Wynn through his company, Mirage Resorts. Project designers included Joel Bergman and Jon Jerde. Wynn announced Treasure Island in October 1991, and construction began four months later. The resort opened on October 26, 1993. Treasure Island was among several family-oriented resorts to open in Las Vegas during the 1990s, taking advantage of the growing tourist demographic. Treasure Island's facade was built with a lagoon containing two pirate ships. Free pirate battles were performed daily for spectators over the next two decades. The resort has also hosted Mystère since 1993, making it the longest-running show by Cirque du Soleil.

In 2000, MGM Grand Inc. acquired Mirage Resorts and was renamed MGM Mirage. Treasure Island's pirate theme was scaled back during a 2003 project aimed at attracting a more mature audience, in contrast to the family trend of the 1990s. MGM's revamp included new signage abbreviating the resort's name as "TI", while the original pirate show, Battle of Buccaneer Bay, was replaced by Sirens of TI.

MGM struggled financially during the Great Recession. In 2009, it sold Treasure Island to Ruffin for $755 million. Ruffin targeted a middle-class clientele, making various changes to appeal to the demographic. He added two signature restaurants: Gilley's Saloon in 2010, and Señor Frog's in 2012. The pirate shows ended the following year, although the ships remain on display.

== History ==
In 1986, casino owner Steve Wynn purchased property on the Las Vegas Strip extending north to Spring Mountain Road. He opened a resort, The Mirage, on the southern portion of the land in 1989. Wynn had always wanted to build a second casino on the remaining acreage, which was being used as a parking lot for the Mirage.

Wynn's company, Mirage Resorts, announced the Treasure Island project on October 30, 1991. Like other new resorts in Las Vegas, Treasure Island was planned as a family-oriented property, taking advantage of the growing tourist demographic. It would also cater to a middle-class clientele, unlike the Mirage. Groundbreaking took place on March 2, 1992, earlier than anticipated. Construction was originally expected to cost $300 million, but the final cost rose to $430 million.

Employees and their families stayed at Treasure Island a couple days before the opening to put the resort through a trial run. Treasure Island opened to the public at 10:00 p.m. on October 26, 1993, following a private opening for VIPs, including Nevada governor Bob Miller. The resort's facade featured a free pirate show taking place in a man-made lagoon. Wynn's other Strip resort, the shuttered Dunes, was imploded the following night in a grand ceremony which incorporated the pirate show. One of the ships fired its cannon as the implosion began, simulating the resort's destruction by cannonballs.

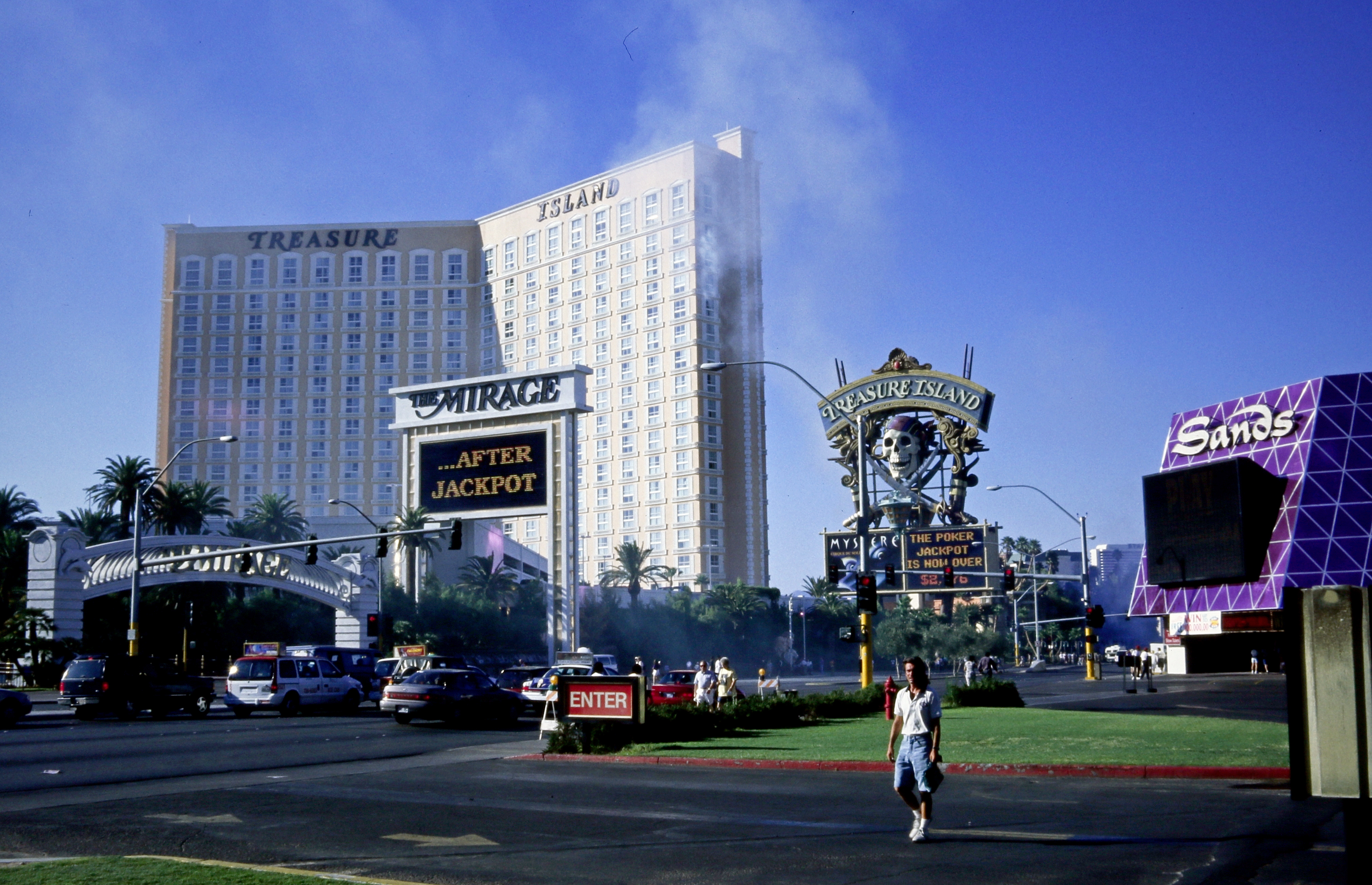
Treasure Island as seen in 1995

In 1996, Treasure Island hosted a naturalization ceremony for 93 workers. It was the first Las Vegas resort to hold such an event.

A man robbed the casino twice in 2000, stealing more than $30,000. He was arrested after a failed third attempt, during which he shot a security guard. He was sentenced to 130 years in prison.

The Prairie Island Indian Community, owners of a Treasure Island casino resort in Minnesota, filed a $250 million damages lawsuit against Mirage Resorts in May 2000. The suit alleged that Wynn violated trademark law by using the "Treasure Island" name for his own casino resort. The suit also requested that Wynn be barred from using the name, which Wynn said he registered in 1993.

Wynn departed Mirage Resorts in 2000, when it was acquired by MGM Grand Inc., later renamed MGM Mirage.

Treasure Island's family amenities included the pirate show and an arcade. However, the pirate theme and family appeal would be gradually scaled back in subsequent years. In April 2003, Treasure Island announced a major revamp to transform the resort into a more sophisticated property aimed primarily at adults, although children would still be welcomed. Describing the resort's transformation, Treasure Island president Scott Sibella said, "We've seen a return of Las Vegas to its roots as an adult destination. As the city has evolved, so too has Treasure Island." He said, "We've evolved from a yo-ho-ho feel to a more sophisticated feel. We want to change the exterior to introduce the outside to what we've already done inside." As part of the revamp, Treasure Island began using the abbreviated name "TI". Sibella described the new name as trendy and sexy, and said it was a name that residents and guests already used. He compared the abbreviated name to the former Desert Inn resort, also known as "D.I." MGM Mirage began a marketing campaign for TI in June 2003, including advertisements in various publications.

MGM struggled financially during the Great Recession, and businessman Phil Ruffin made an offer to buy Treasure Island. MGM accepted and announced the deal at the end of 2008. The purchase was finalized on March 20, 2009, at a cost of $755 million. At the time, Treasure Island was the only hotel-casino on the Strip to be owned by a single individual, as others are corporate-owned. Because of the sale, Treasure Island was removed from MGM's extensive customer database. Later that year, the resort joined K Hotels, a worldwide collection of approximately 50 hotels. Amid the recession, Ruffin spent $20 million on various changes to target a middle-class clientele. The hotel rooms were left untouched, as MGM had conducted a $92 million renovation of them shortly before selling the resort to Ruffin.

A rooftop swamp cooler caught fire in July 2012, sending smoke through hallways of the upper hotel floors, which were evacuated. The fire caused $20,000 in damage, but resulted in only minor injuries for guests.

In 2019, Treasure Island's hotel joined Radisson Hotel Group. Under the agreement, the resort kept its name and exterior signage. Room renovations began that year. State casinos were temporarily closed in 2020, due to the COVID-19 pandemic in Nevada, and the closure allowed planned renovations across the resort to accelerate. Among the additions was an expanded sportsbook.

Accor, a French hospitality company, announced a franchise agreement with Treasure Island in July 2025. Set to take effect later in the year, the hotel will join Accor's global network and become its first property in the Las Vegas Valley.

=== 2016 Assassination attempt on Donald Trump ===
On June 18, 2016 a 20 year old British citizen, Michael Steven Sandford attempted to assassinate then Presidential candidate Donald Trump. Sandford attempted to grab a service pistol of a Las Vegas police officer during the rally with the intention of shooting Trump. Sandford was unable to carry out the assassination and was apprehended by law enforcement. Donald Trump was unharmed. Treasure Island owner, Phil Ruffin is a business partner of Donald Trump's and a supporter of his presidential campaigns. Trump has held several campaign rallies at Treasure Island, including the one in 2016 during which an audience member attempted to assassinate him.

== Features ==
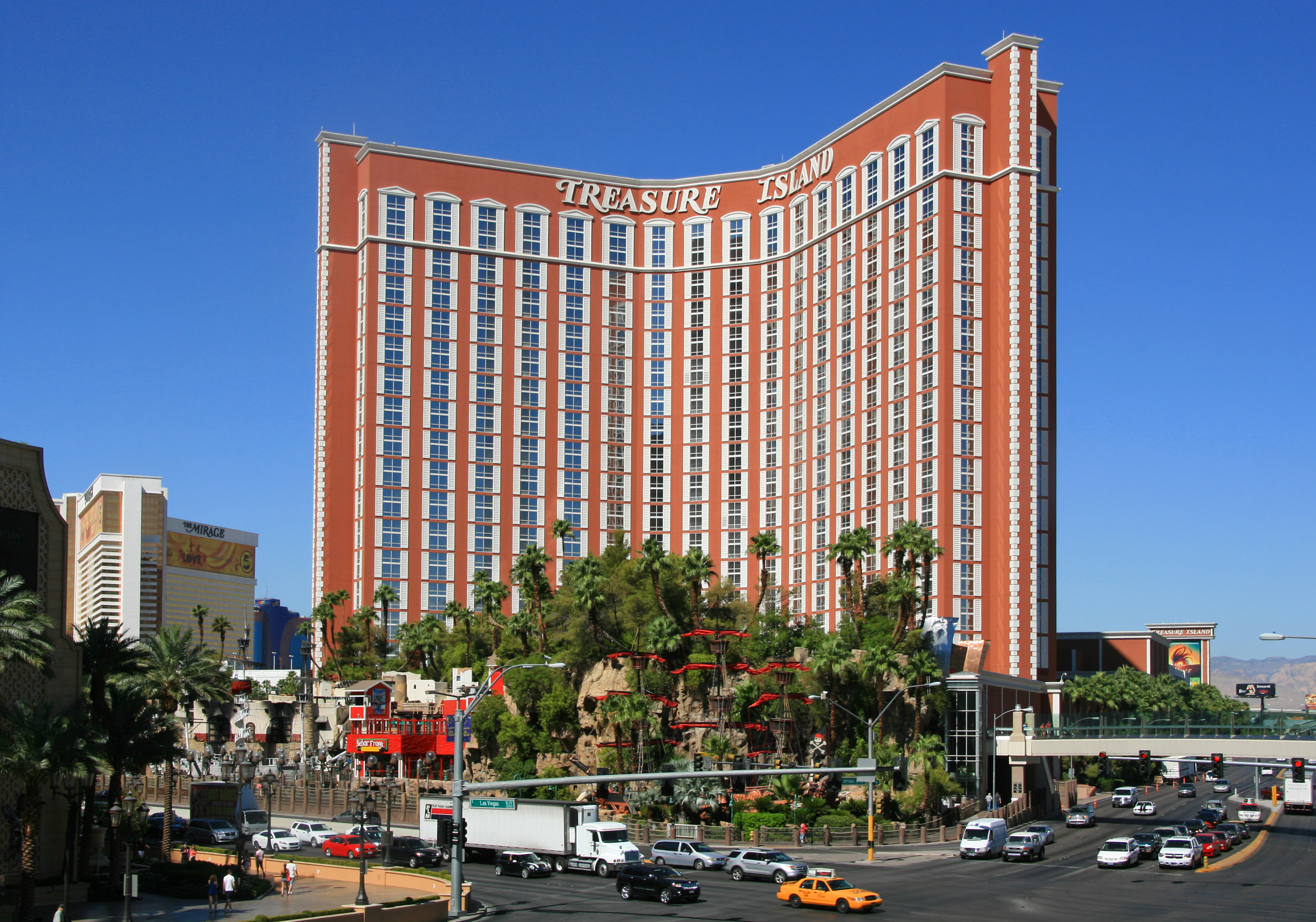
Treasure Island with new paint color

Treasure Island includes a 47,927 sq ft (4,452.6 m^{2}) casino, and has 2,885 rooms, located in a 36-story tower. As part of the 2003 transformation, the tower was given a darker paint color, using 6,200 gallons of terra cotta/"Salmon Stream" paint, replacing an earlier pink coloring. Treasure Island received a Four Diamond Award every year from 1999 to 2013.

Tangerine, a nightclub featuring an orange and white interior, operated from 2004 to 2007. Fashion designer Christian Audigier opened an eponymous nightclub at Treasure Island in 2008, in partnership with Pure Management Group. The decor included rhinestone-encrusted skulls and two large tanks containing jellyfish. Audigier said, "When you're going into a club, you want to see sparkling and glitter and rhinestones". Christian Audigier did not perform as well as Ruffin would have liked, prompting its closure in 2010. Ruffin's other changes included a $3 million makeover of the spa, with renovations overseen by his wife Oleksandra Nikolayenko. At one point, Treasure Island had 18,000 sq ft (1,700 m^{2}) of convention space, which received a $4 million renovation in 2012. Four years later, the space was expanded to 30,500 sq ft (2,830 m^{2}).

In 2013, the resort announced plans to build a three-story mall, replacing the northern portion of the pirate lagoon area. It was completed two years later, and includes a CVS Pharmacy on the first floor. At the end of 2015, the resort announced that it would lease the upper floors to Victory Hill Exhibitions. In 2016, the company opened the Avengers S.T.A.T.I.O.N., an interactive self-guided exhibit based on the Marvel Cinematic Universe.

The Hard Rock-Treasure Island Tram traveled between Treasure Island and The Mirage prior to the closure of The Mirage. It temporarily ceased operations in June 2024 prior to The Mirage's closing on July 17, 2024. It will reopen once Hard Rock Las Vegas opens in 2027.

=== Theme and design ===
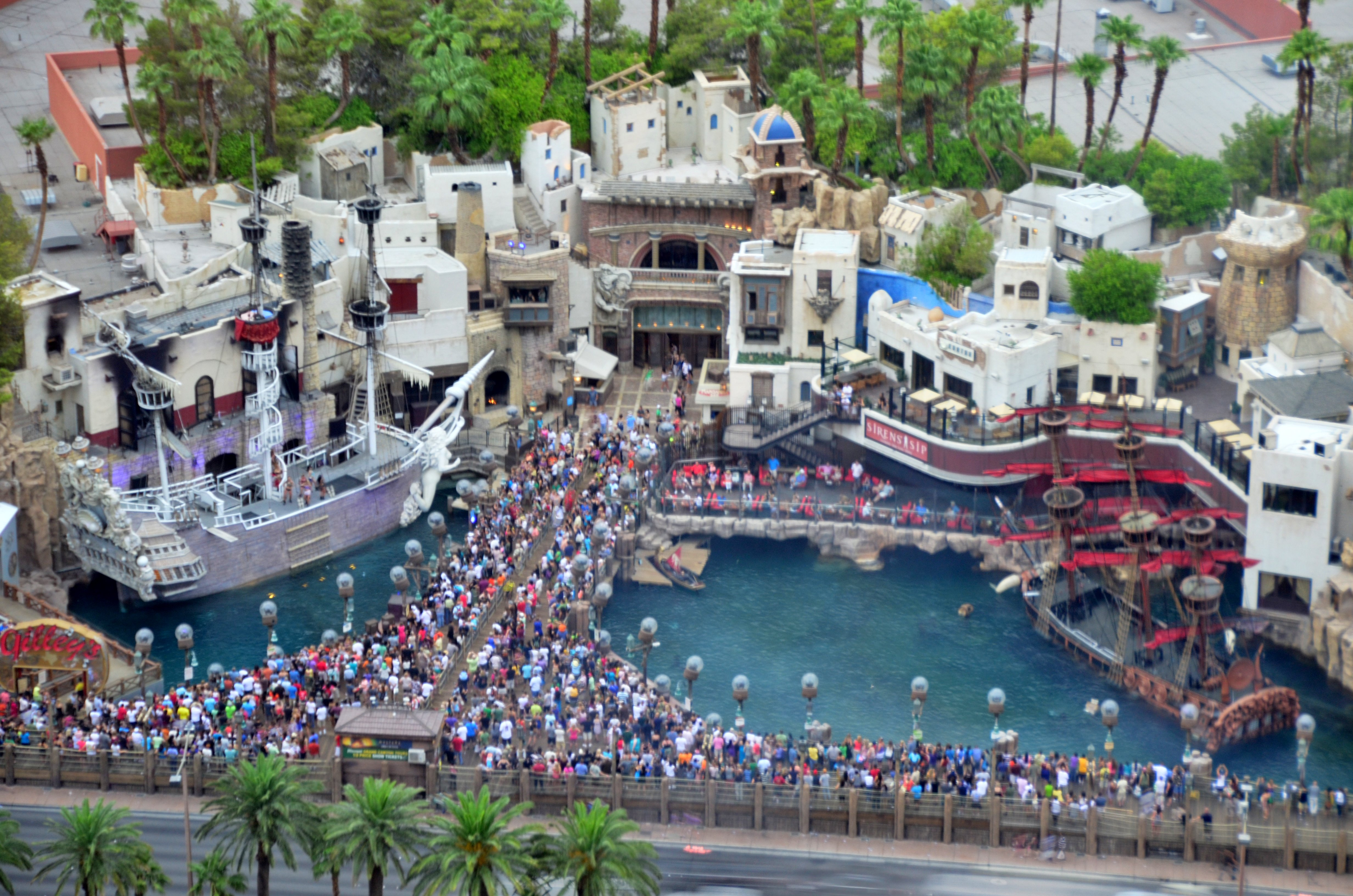
Pirate village and lagoon in 2011

Various themes were considered for the resort, until a friend of Wynn's suggested the name "Treasure Island", resulting in a pirate theme. It is named after the 1880s novel Treasure Island by Robert Louis Stevenson. The resort was designed by Joel Bergman, who previously designed the Mirage. Bergman designed the Treasure Island tower with a floorplan that branched out three ways in a Y-shape, with elevators in the center. This was done for convenience to guests, making the walk to their rooms brief. The Y-shape was modeled after the Mirage hotel tower.

Wynn's Atlandia Design worked with Jon Jerde and Olio Design to create the pirate village and lagoon area, originally known as Buccaneer Bay, and later as Siren's Cove. During the design phase, the hotel's lobby entrance was moved to the resort's south side, in order to maintain Buccaneer Bay's location on the east side along the Strip. Jerde's assistants traveled across Europe, India and Nepal searching for historic objects such as doors and columns, which were then replicated for Buccaneer Bay. The lagoon is 65 feet deep, and originally contained 2 million gallons of water. It uses wastewater recycled from a water treatment plant located beneath the resort's parking garage. A maintenance team, including divers, works to keep the lagoon clean.

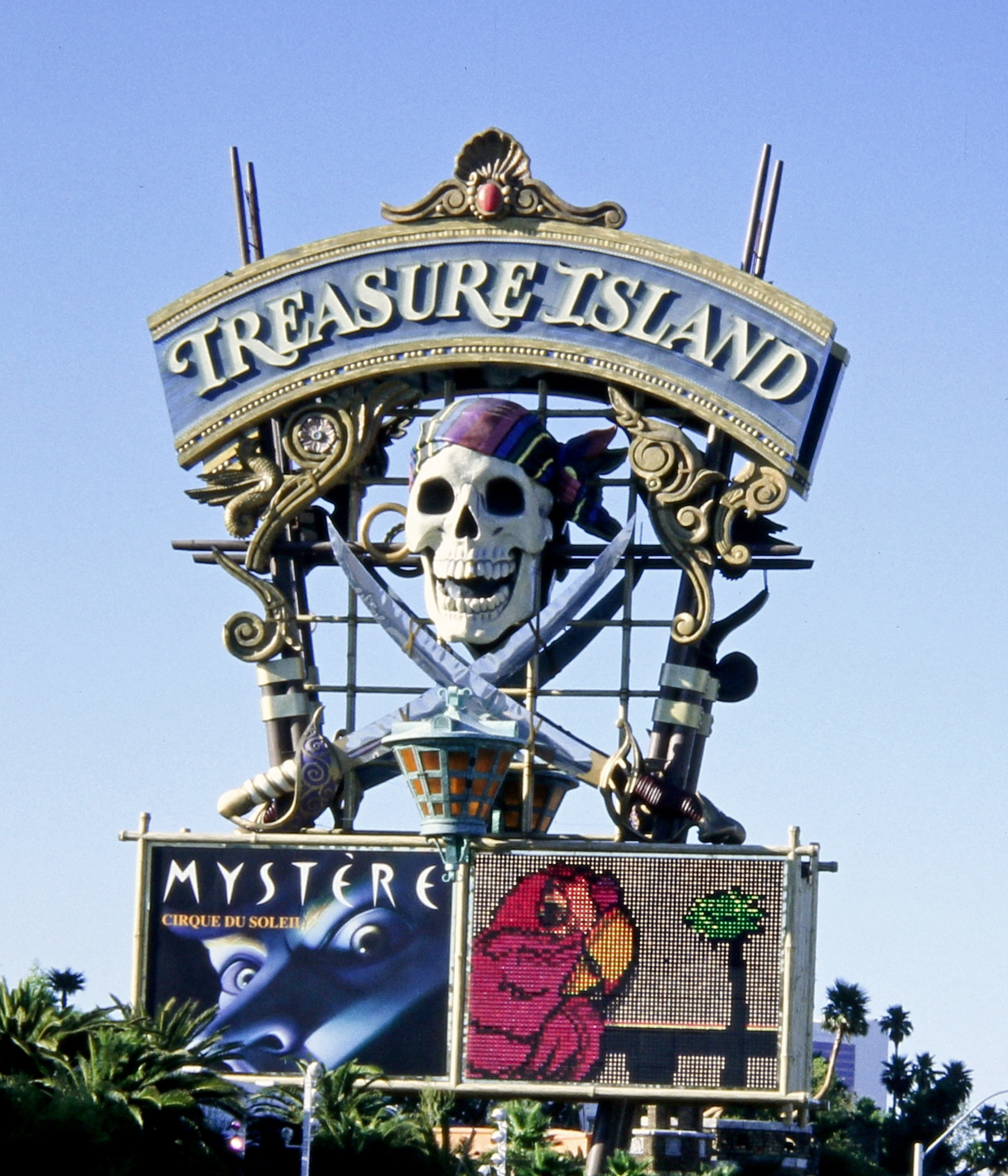
Original skull sign

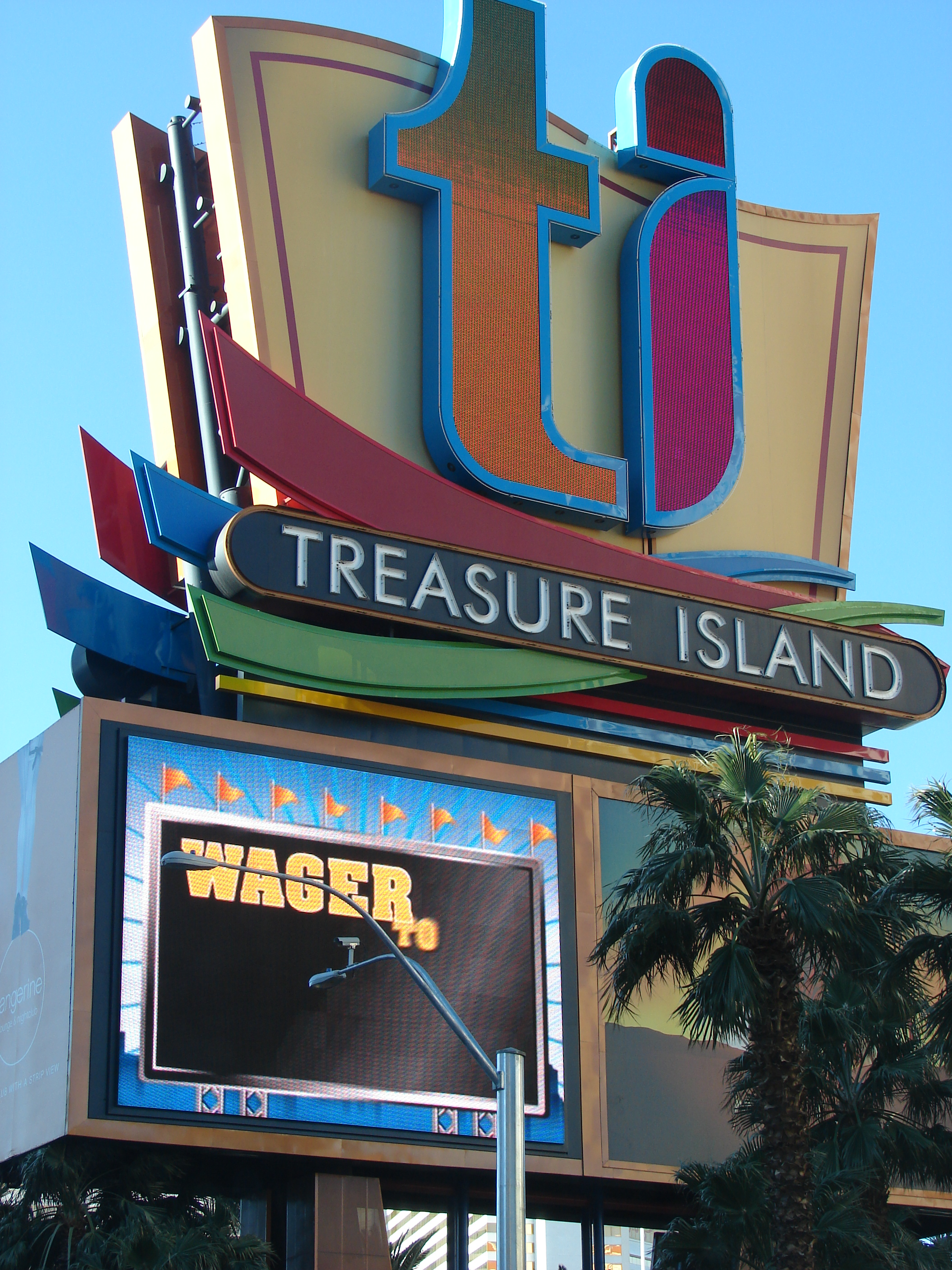
New TI sign

According to interior designer Roger Thomas, "We thought it would be great fun to create a pirate village with sinking ships and pyrotechnics. The day after it opened we all looked at each other and said, 'What have we done? This is so not us'". Executives realized that the resort's heavy pirate theme did not appeal to people interested in a weekend getaway. By 1998, efforts had begun to downplay the theme. Mirage conducted focus group testing to determine upcoming renovation plans for Treasure Island. A $60 million remodeling of the hotel rooms took place in 1999.

The resort initially included a roadside sign featuring an 8,000-pound pirate skull, made of fiberglass and measuring 27 1/2 feet. The skull sign was removed on July 10, 2003, in a ceremony accompanied by fireworks. Sibella said, "It's a cool sign, but it needs to complement what we're doing inside", referring to the property's revamp. The skull portion was donated to the city's Neon Museum, while much of the remaining sign was scrapped. The sign was replaced by an LED neon "TI" sign with a modern and sophisticated design. The new sign measures 137 feet high and 84 feet wide.

Various pirate memorabilia had been removed from the resort over the course of three years, and was auctioned in September 2003.

=== Restaurants ===
Treasure Island opened with several restaurants, including Buccaneer Bay Club, which overlooked the lagoon and its pirate shows. Its menu included steak and seafood. A fine-dining Italian restaurant, Francesco's, was added in 1998. It featured artwork by celebrities such as Tony Bennett and Phyllis Diller.

The arcade was replaced in 2001 by a tropical-themed restaurant and bar named Kahunaville, part of efforts to appeal to a more-adult demographic. Kahunaville included a dinner show space for live entertainment. A new buffet, Dishes, was added in 2005. An Asian restaurant known as Social House opened a year later, replacing Buccaneer Bay Club.

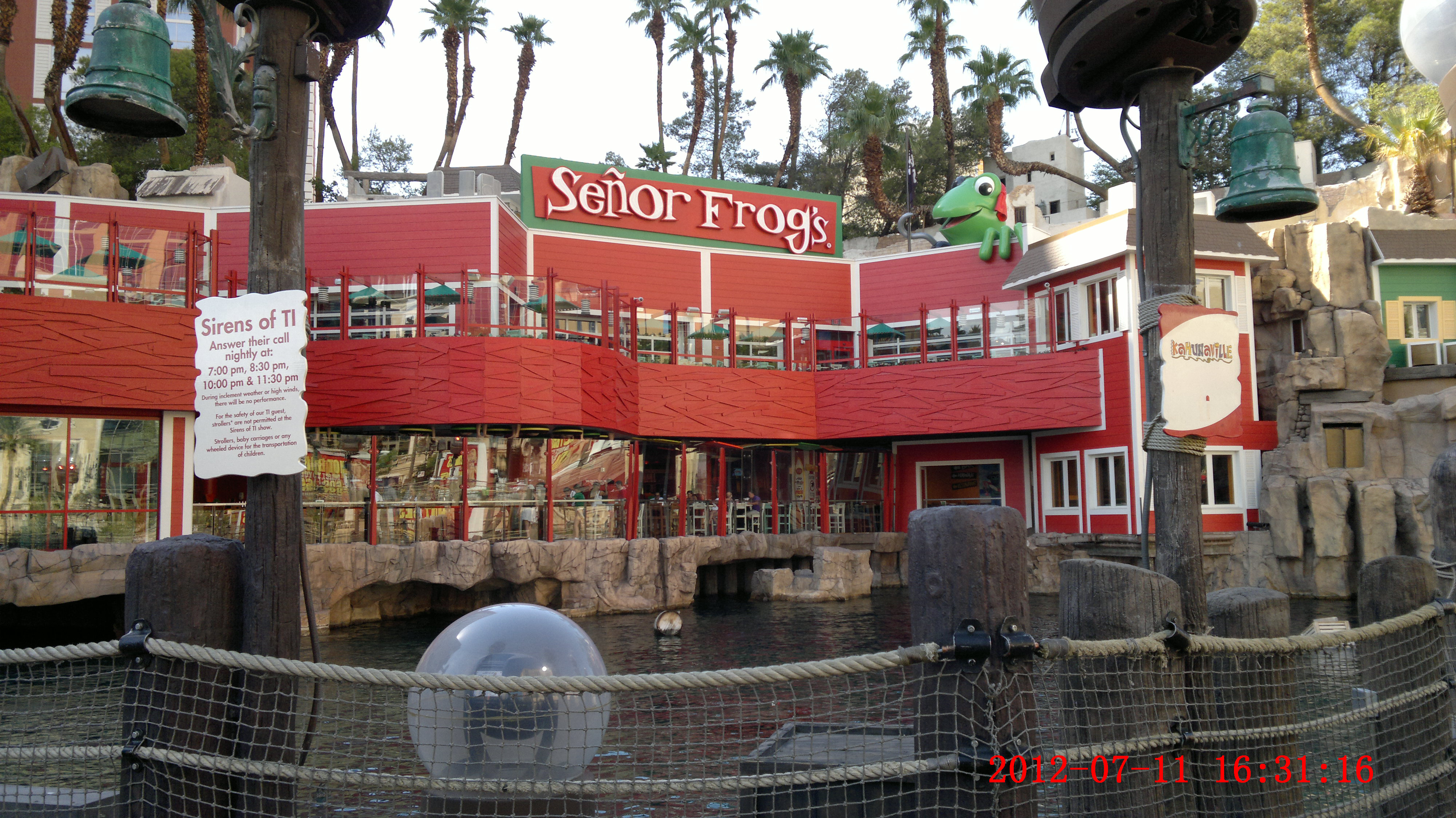
Señor Frog's, which overlooks the lagoon area

Ruffin made numerous restaurant changes upon taking ownership. In 2009, he replaced Francesco's with a pizzeria by the same name, stating, "It's quick and it's cheap and that's what people are looking for these days". Ruffin also replaced Social House with his own Asian restaurant, Khotan, featuring jade and ivory antiques from his personal collection. In 2010, he opened Gilley's Saloon, a popular Western-themed restaurant, bar and dance hall. It previously operated at Ruffin's New Frontier hotel-casino, which closed in 2007. The new location replaced Treasure Island's Mist Lounge.

In 2012, Ruffin opened a Señor Frog's restaurant and bar to complement Kahunaville and Gilley's. It replaced Christian Audigier and Khotan, the latter relocating elsewhere in the resort. Another new restaurant, Seafood Shack, also opened in 2012. Its interior was created with recycled materials, including reclaimed wood which lines the walls. The restaurant's centerpiece is an anchor pulled from the Atlantic Ocean. The resort also has Phil's Steak House, named after Ruffin. Kahunaville closed in 2016.

== Live entertainment ==
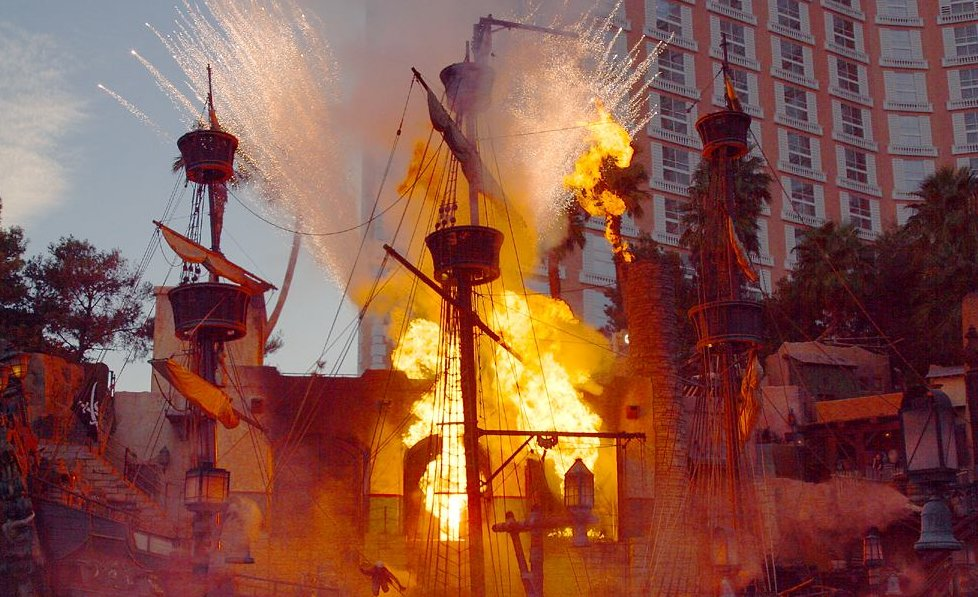
A performance of Sirens of TI

Treasure Island opened with the free Battle of Buccaneer Bay pirate show, performed in the lagoon along the Strip. The 15-minute show was performed several times a day and featured 22 actors. It depicted the landing and subsequent sacking of a Caribbean village by pirates, serving to attract customers from the Strip and into the resort after each show in the same fashion as the volcano fronting the Mirage resort. Notable special effects included a full-scale, crewed British Royal Navy sailing ship that sailed nearly the full width of the property, a gas-fired "powder magazine" explosion, pyrotechnics, and the sinking of the sailing ship Brittania along with its captain.

Battle of Buccaneer Bay held its final performance on July 6, 2003, with a total of 16,334 shows performed over the course of nearly 10 years. It ended as part of the resort's ongoing revamp, which would include a new pirate show. Sibella described the original show as something that would be expected at Disneyland, while calling its successor a "sexy and beautiful, adult Broadway-caliber show."

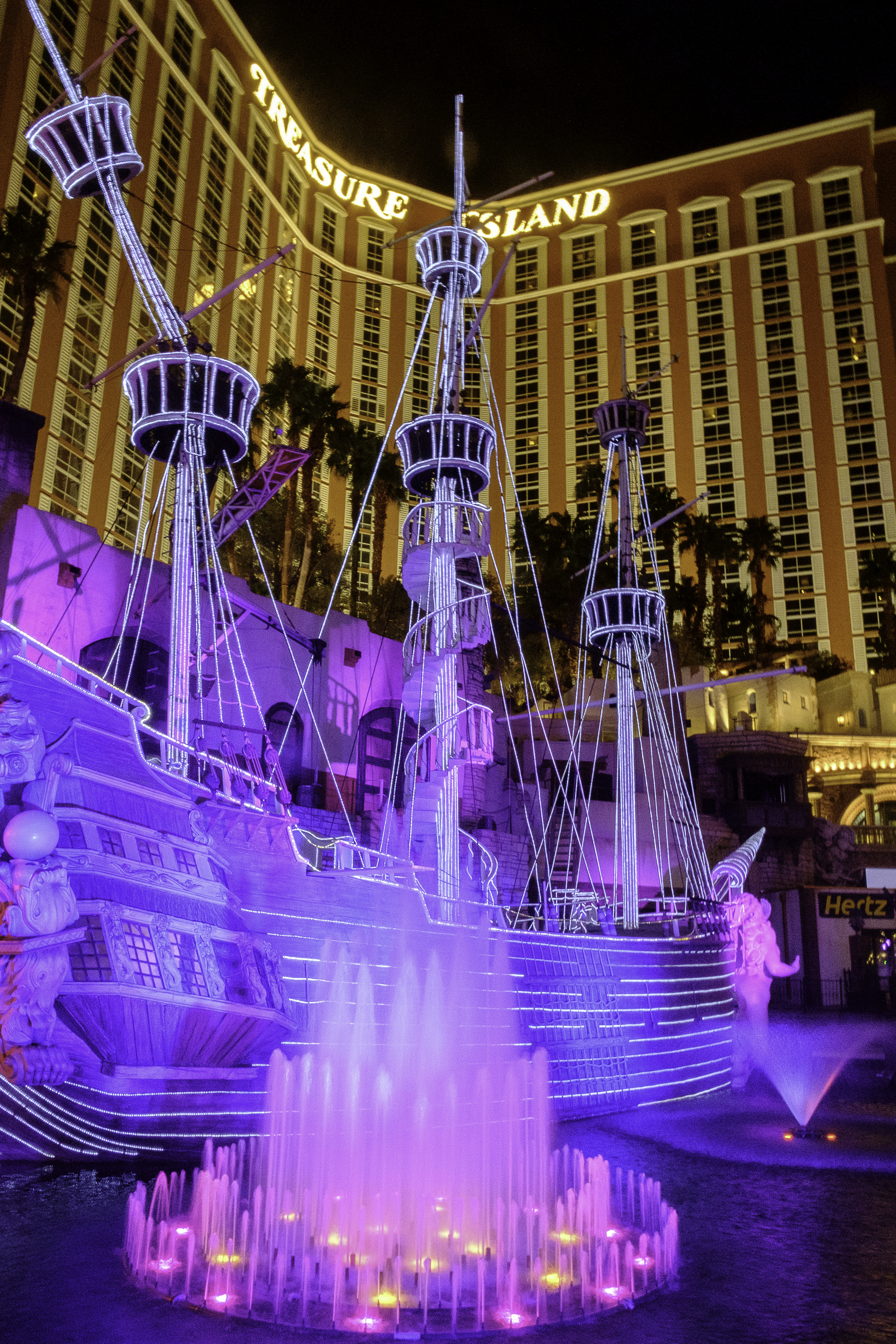
Illuminated pirate ship in 2017

The new Sirens of TI pirate show debuted in October 2003, marking the resort's 10th anniversary. The Buccaneer Bay was renamed Sirens' Cove and the new show utilized many of the technical elements of its predecessor. The live, free show was intended to appeal more to adults by including singing, dancing, audio-visual effects, bare-chested pirates and attractive women in the large outdoor show produced by Kenny Ortega. The original two ships were kept for the new show but repainted and altered, as well as some special effects.

Sirens of TI was closed on October 21, 2013. The closure was initially intended to be temporary, but was made permanent the following month, to the dismay of the show's actors. The reason cited by Treasure Island was the construction of the new retail space nearby. The shows had cost $5 million to put on annually. While Ruffin said the shows brought "a tremendous amount of attention" to Treasure Island, they amounted to minimal foot traffic inside the resort. The pirate ships remain on display in the lagoon, and are lit up at night.

Treasure Island is home to Cirque du Soleil's Mystère, which introduced the entertainment style of Franco Dragone. It opened on December 25, 1993, and has been voted nine times as the best production show in the city by the Las Vegas Review-Journal reader's poll. It is Cirque's longest-running Las Vegas show, reaching 13,000 performances in 2022. Mystère has been updated several times throughout its run. It takes place in a 1,600-seat theater, designed by Scéno Plus. To maximize use of the Mystère theater, Ruffin signed entertainers to perform there on nights when the show is not running. Such entertainers have included Bill Cosby, LeAnn Rimes, and Sinbad. The resort has also hosted boxing matches.

== In popular culture ==
An hour-long promotional program, Treasure Island: The Adventure Begins, aired on NBC in January 1994. It stars Corey Carrier as a 12-year-old on vacation with his parents at the resort. There, he meets and teams up with Long John Silver (Anthony Zerbe) to find lost treasure. Mirage Resorts paid NBC $1.7 million to air the program. It was directed and produced by Scott Garen, and written by James V. Hart. The special includes an appearance by Wynn, and incorporates the Dunes' implosion as its climax. The program received low viewership ratings, and was considered an infomercial by critics, who lambasted NBC for not labeling it as such.

Treasure Island has been shown or referenced in other media as well:

- In the 2004 movie Dodgeball: A True Underdog Story, while Steve the Pirate is walking down Fremont Street, someone drives by yelling "Go back to Treasure Island". An alternative ending to the movie was that the Average Joes lost the dodgeball tournament, but got their money back when Steve won it at Treasure Island.
- Treasure Island appears in the 2004 video game Grand Theft Auto: San Andreas under the name "Pirates in Men's Pants", a pun referencing Pirates of Penzance.
- The resort was a major production location for the 2005 film Miss Congeniality 2, which included filming of the Sirens of TI show.
- In the 2007 film Knocked Up, Ben (Seth Rogen) and Pete (Paul Rudd) see Mystère at Treasure Island during their visit to Las Vegas.

== See also ==
- List of integrated resorts
