= Tiffany Coyne =

American model and dancer

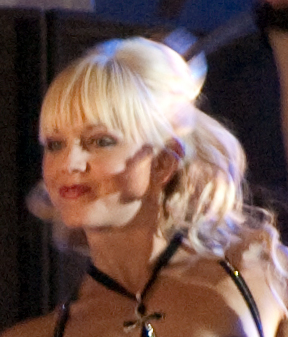
- Coyne in 2009
- Born: Tiffany Lynn Adams; May 6, 1982 (age 44); Layton, Utah, U.S.
- Occupations: Model; dancer
- Years active: 2010–present
- Spouse: Chris Coyne
- Children: 2
- Modeling information
- Hair color: Blonde
- Website: tiffanycoyne.com

Tiffany Adams Coyne (born May 6, 1982) is an American model and dancer presently known best for her role of model and hostess on the CBS game show Let's Make a Deal.

== Early life and education ==
On May 6, 1982, Tiffany Lynn Adams was born in Layton, Utah. Her father is of German descent and her mother of Hungarian descent, and she has two sisters, five stepsisters, and two stepbrothers.

In 1985, at around age three, Coyne began dancing, focusing on jazz, hip hop, and ballet. As a youth, her family moved a lot because her mother "liked to build houses". The family lived near Hill Air Force Base, and Adams attended middle school and one year of high school in West Haven, Utah. She completed her high school education at Northridge High School in Layton after the family moved back to the town, graduating in 2000. She was on the dance squad at nearby Fremont High School.

== Career ==
Coyne spent two years with the America First Jazz Dancers for the Utah Jazz around late 2000 to 2003. During that time, she also taught dance classes locally. After a stint performing on a cruise ship, Coyne relocated to Las Vegas, Nevada and performed in Jubilee!, Fashionistas, and Sirens of TI.

In 2009, when CBS relaunched the game show Let's Make a Deal, Coyne, at age 27, was hired as the show's floor model following multiple auditions. She taped two episodes daily and then continued performing in Sirens of TI at night. Deal moved to Los Angeles during the first season, resulting in Coyne commuting back and forth between California and Nevada five days a week until she relocated to Los Angeles for the second season. She then took classes in order to improve her improvisation skills while working with Wayne Brady and Jonathan Mangum.

In addition to Let's Make a Deal, Coyne appeared as herself in The Bold and the Beautiful, was a stand-in on The Price Is Right, and did modeling work for United Airlines and Chase Bank. Coyne has made a number of guest appearances on episodes of Whose Line Is It Anyway?.

== Personal life ==
Coyne and her husband, singer Chris Coyne, were living in Los Angeles in 2013. They had their first child in 2013.

== See also ==
- Let's Make a Deal
