= Over the Top (TV series) =

- Genre: Sitcom
- Created by: Michael Katlin; Nat Bernstein
- Directed by: Michael Lembeck
- Starring: Tim Curry; Annie Potts; Steve Carell; Marla Sokoloff; Luke Tarsitano; Liz Torres; John O'Hurley
- Composer: Rick Marotta
- Country of origin: United States
- Original language: English
- No. of seasons: 1
- No. of episodes: 12 (9 unaired)

Production
- Producers: Robert Morton; Mitchel Katlin; Nat Bernstein; Rosalind Moore; Daniel Palladino; Amy Sherman-Palladino; Tim Curry; Annie Potts
- Camera setup: Multi-camera
- Running time: 30 minutes
- Production companies: Katlin/Bernstein Productions; Panamort Television; Greengrass Productions; Columbia TriStar Television

Original release
- Network: ABC
- Release: October 21 – November 4, 1997

Over the Top is an American sitcom starring Tim Curry, Annie Potts, and Steve Carell. The series premiered on ABC on October 21, 1997. Although 11 episodes (plus a pilot) were produced, the series was canceled after only three had aired.

== Synopsis ==
After being fired from the soap opera Days to Remember, down on his luck, eccentric, self-centered actor Simon Ferguson (Tim Curry) moves into Manhattan's Metropolitan Hotel, which is run by ex-wife Hadley Martin (Annie Potts), to whom he was married for twelve days twenty years prior. Despite her initial exasperation with her ex, Hadley again succumbs to the "Ferguson charm", as do all of those around her.

Simon reluctantly plays role model to Hadley's children from a different marriage: precocious 7 1/2-year-old Daniel (Luke Tarsitano) and angst-ridden teen Gwen (Marla Sokoloff). The hotel's psychotic Greek chef, Yorgo Galfanikos (Steve Carell), also looks up to Simon, having been a fan of his soap opera and films. Also seen are Rose (Liz Torres), the hotel's assistant manager, Robert McSwain (John O'Hurley), the hotel's main investor, Tommy Sutton (Devin Neil Oatway), a popular jock Gwen fawns over, and Jesse (Danny Strong), a geek who is smitten with Gwen.

Episodes mostly centered around Simon's outlandish shenanigans and attempts to break back into show business.

== Cast and characters ==
- Tim Curry as Simon Ferguson
  The star of his acting class, Simon was a British actor with a promising career ahead of him, even garnering an Academy Award nomination in 1977, but his ego got in the way. After gaining a reputation for being difficult to work with, he was forced to take roles in straight-to-video fare like "Hardbodies 3," and eventually the trashy TV soap opera "Days to Remember." Simon's only real friend is Hadley, whom he was briefly married to decades earlier.
- Annie Potts as Hadley Martin
  Hailing from Tennessee, Hadley moved to New York to pursue an acting career, but following a string of rejection and failed marriages, she found herself playing a single-mom to a pair of kids while managing a hotel in Manhattan.
- Steve Carell as Yorgo Galfanikos
  A Greek immigrant who's obsessed with presenting the perfect meal, chef Yorgo exudes a manic temperament that comes across as hostile even when he's being sincere.
- Luke Tarsitano as Daniel Martin
  Hadley's 7-year-old son questions everything and is a constant source of aggravation for both his sister and Simon.
- Marla Sokoloff as Gwen Martin
  Hadley's defiant teenage daughter, who's smitten with boys and social status.
- Liz Torres as Rose
  The hefty Assistant Manager of The Metropolitan Hotel, the Hispanic Rose takes no guff from anyone and is quick to spout off her opinion on any subject.
- John O'Hurley as Robert McSwain
  The infrequently-seen hotel investor is conservative to the point of being repressed, and his crush on Hadley is transparent.

== Production ==
The show was pitched in early 1996 to ABC president Ted Harbert, and although it would not be ready to hit the air for the 1996–1997 season, it remained in development. Tim Curry was aboard and wanted the relationship between the two leads to be loosely based on his relationship with friend and next door neighbor Annie Potts, to whom he said, "I wish you could do this with me!" Potts was starring in the TV spin-off of the popular film Dangerous Minds at the time, so it did not seem as though a reunion was imminent (the two had previously co-starred together as husband and wife in the film Pass the Ammo). Three days before they were ready to shoot the pilot for Over the Top, Dangerous Minds was canceled, and although Potts was heartbroken over the cancellation of that series, she jumped at the chance to work with Curry again.

The premise of the pilot was that Curry's character, actor Simon Ferguson, was fired from his soap opera, so he visited the quaint bed and breakfast in Upstate New York owned by his ex-wife, Kate (Potts), whom he was once married to for six months. Although flabbergasted with Simon, Kate ultimately decided to let her ex stay on as a new addition to the staff. The cast was rounded out by Luke Tarsitano and Natanya Ross as Kate's children from a subsequent marriage, Debra Jo Rupp as the maid, and a then-unknown actor named Steve Carell as manic chef Yorgo.

By the time the pilot was filmed, ABC Entertainment president Ted Harbert had been replaced by Jamie Tarses, whom executive producer Robert Morton was dating. Rumors began to swirl that the series was only picked up as a result of their romance, and it did not help matters that the press was only shown snippets of the pilot episode. In the months between the time the series was picked up and its scheduled premiere, Morton and Tarses's relationship ended.

Originally slated to debut on September 23, 1997 the show's premiere was delayed until October 21, opposite the World Series, so it could be retooled. Natanya Ross and Debra Jo Rupp were replaced by Marla Sokoloff and Liz Torres, and John O'Hurley's character was written into the show on a recurring basis. Kate was renamed Hadley and her character became more sympathetic toward Simon. The setting was changed to New York City and the pilot was reshot (as the episode "I'm Bonnie, I'm Clyde"). The reason given for the retooling was because in NYC there would be more opportunities "for comedic interaction with city characters", but the press began to speculate that the changes were again a result of the failed Tarses/Morton romance. Morton sidestepped this question by claiming, "We needed to give Tim a bigger playing field," and that the cast "was not as comfortable with each other as we wanted". ABC, meanwhile, claimed that they did not want their 8:00 p.m. lead-in show, Soul Man, to face off against what was expected to be a high-rated season premiere of Mad About You, so they rearranged the schedule. "By shifting Soul Man's time slot for the first few weeks of the season," Tarses released in a public statement, "we're giving this pivotal series the luxury to recapture its audience without intense premiere competition."

The show's stars, however, remained optimistic. Curry went on a promotional tour, appearing on talk shows such as The View, Vibe, Live with Regis and Kathie Lee, and Arthel & Fred, though interviewers seemed to focus less on Over the Top and more on The Rocky Horror Picture Show. Potts, meanwhile, also did some interviews, barely acknowledging the behind the scenes problems and claiming that the show should speak for itself.

Over the Top received minuscule network promotion (generally only small blurbs tacked onto the ends of commercials for Soul Man) and aired for three weeks with dismal ratings before being canceled (in some markets the final November 4 episode was bumped off the schedule unannounced for election coverage, and some TV Guide listings were a little slow to catch up, citing the unaired episodes "Who's Afraid of Simon Ferguson?" and "The Review" in the weeks following the show's cancellation). Production was instantly halted two episodes shy of the standard 13-episode order for a new series, and almost immediately following the show's cancellation, executive producers Mitchel Katlin and Nat Bernstein cried foul, blaming the Morton/Tarses breakup for the demise of the show.

== Episodes ==
=== Pilot ===
Title	Original release date	Prod. code
"Pilot"	Unaired	0100
Simon arrives to the set of his soap opera late, hungover, and unprepared, so he's fired. With no prospects, he visits a hotel in upstate New York owned his ex-wife, Kate, who's surprised to see him and quickly seduced by his charms. After awakening in a drunken haze, Kate wants him to leave, but she softens after realizing he's lost his job, and she's touched when he bonds with her unruly teenage daughter. Note: The next episode is a revised version of this pilot, featuring basically the same plot, some of the same jokes, and three new cast members. Guest stars: Debra Jo Rupp (Rose), Natanya Ross (Gwen)

=== Season 1 (1997) ===
No.	Title	Directed by	Written by	Original release date	Prod. code	Viewers (millions)
1	"I'm Bonnie, I'm Clyde"	Michael Lembeck	Nat Bernstein & Mitchel Katlin	October 21, 1997	0101	12.53
A down-on-his-luck Simon sweeps into the hotel run by his ex-wife Hadley, and he proceeds to turn her life upside-down. Note: This is a retooled version of the pilot. Guest stars: John O'Hurley (Robert McSwain), Lou Felder (The Business Man)
2	"The Kernel"	Michael Lembeck	Alex Reid	October 28, 1997	0103	10.94
Simon is hired back on the soap opera, but he learns that it's at the behest of the sister of the network's president, who's smitten with him. Guest star: Alyson Reed (Dot), Barry Gordon (Marty), Steve Bean (Larry), Megan Paul (The Girl), Heinrich James (Klaus), Clement von Franckenstein (Eric), Lee Grober (The Doctor). Jack MacDonald (The Man)
3	"The Nemesis"	Michael Lembeck	David Litt	November 4, 1997	0108	9.79
Simon's and Hadley's old friend Justin (John Ritter) shows up unexpectedly, with plans to sabotage Simon's audition. Guest star: Randall Rapstine (The Casting Director)
4	"Who's Afraid of Simon Ferguson?"	Michael Lembeck	David Brownfield	Unaired	0102	N/A
Daniel has landed the lead in the school's production of Jack and the Beanstalk, and he ropes Simon into directing. But Simon downsizes Daniel's role and hams it up as the giant when he mistakenly discerns that one of the students is the son of a famous TV producer -- but the man is actually a TV repairman. Meanwhile, Rose gives Gwen bad romantic advice which spirals out of control when she tries to pass Yorgo off as Gwen's boyfriend. Guest stars: Diana Bellamy (Principal Blankman), Drew Pillsbury (John Preminger), Devin Neil Oatway (Tommy), Aysia Polk (Brooke) Sydney Barry (Suzy), Michael Galasso (Steven), Allan Murray (The Hotel Guest), Sherry Quander (Louise)
5	"Acting Out"	Michael Lembeck	David Litt	Unaired	0109	N/A
When Gwen gets picked as an extra in a Spike Lee movie, Simon encourages her to pursue an acting career. This doesn't sit well with Hadley, who has a blowup with Simon, resulting in her attending an acting class and him paying a visit to Nigel (Ian Abercrombie), his acting mentor. Meanwhile, after learning that the woman who was betrothed to him is marrying his brother, Yorgo tries to enlist one of his coworkers to murder his sibling. Guest stars: Michael McGuire (John Miselle), Andrew McKenzie (Kirk)
6	"Fight Night at the Metropolitan"	Michael Lembeck	Tom J. Astle & David Brownfield	Unaired	0111	N/A
When Hadley starts a "Sports Sunday" theme at the hotel's restaurant, Yorgo blows his savings on merchandise to hawk, and Simon stands up to a few bullies who'd rather watch football than soccer. Meanwhile, shy young Jesse (Danny Strong) charms everyone but Gwen, who's more interested in his popular buddy. Also, Rose tries to sabotage the honeymoon of her ex-fiancée, Erik Estrada (who portrays himself). Guest stars: David L. Crowley (Wayne), Steven R. Barnett (Vic)
7	"The Review"	Michael Lembeck	Josh Goldsmith & Cathy Yuspa	Unaired	0104	N/A
Hadley panics when New York Times critic Brookes Jenson (Martin Mull) visits, and she pressures Yorgo to throw together an elaborate bouillabaisse. Simon dazzles Mr. Jenson and accidentally enhances Yorgo's stew, giving the critic a marvelous impression of the hotel. As Jenson leaves to pen the five-star review that he'd promised Hadley, Simon throws a baseball to Daniel and accidentally whacks the writer on the head. Jenson returns the next day with no memory of his visit, so Simon and Hadley try to recreate his previous stay at the hotel, but every restep ends in disaster. Jenson is set to write a terrible review until he bumps into Robert, his former Yale bunkmate, who changes his mind. Also, Gwen tries to score tickets to a Beck concert. Guest star: John O'Hurley (Robert McSwain)
8	"Simon, We Hardly Knew Ye"	Michael Lembeck	Lee Aronsohn	Unaired	0105	N/A
To get Daniel out of his hair, Simon convinces Robert that if he bonds with the boy, he can win Hadley's affections. Meanwhile, Hadley agrees to act as Simon's agent, but gigs like laundromat openings and portraying Benjamin Franklin in a kite-flying contest aren't up to his standards, so Simon fires her and tries to stir publicity by faking his death. Unfortunately, his reputation suffers a bigger blow when he attends his own memorial service. Also, Yorgo decides to vacation at some of the top tourist destinations in the United States (Dollywood, Graceland, Las Vegas, etc.), where he photographs himself with squirrels and chipmunks. Guest stars: Del Harris (The Minister), Sam Rubin (The News Anchor), Phill Lewis (William Brackett), Carolyn Greig Holmgren (The Woman Customer), Casey Williams (The Producer), Darla Haun (The Beautiful Woman)
9	"It's Gwen's Party and Hadly'll Cry If She Wants To"	Michael Lembeck	Amy Sherman-Palladino	Unaired	0106	N/A
Gwen finds herself at odds with everyone in the hotel when she throws a party. Meanwhile, Hadley goes on an awkward date with Robert. Guest stars: John O'Hurley (Robert McSwain), Devin Oatway (Tommy), Kente Scott (Derek), Danny Strong (Jesse), David Allen Blackburn (The Waiter), Anastasia Horne (Maria)
10	"The Bee Story"	Michael Lembeck	Tom J. Astle	Unaired	0107	N/A
Daniel pours milk over a bully's head, forcing Hadley and Simon to confront his parents, who are also bullies. Daniel later wins the spelling bee and is accused of cheating by using a study list that Simon swiped from the teacher's office, but it turns out to have been the wrong list, so Daniel is cleared. Meanwhile, Yorgo stalks Linda (Mary Lynn Rajskub), the strange mail carrier, and tries to work up the nerve to ask her out. Guest stars: Meagen Fay (Mrs. Hampstead), Jon Polito (Mr. Hampstead), Nealla Gordon (Mrs. Kleiger), Drake Bell (Clarence), Patrick McTavish (Oliver)
11	"The Southern Story"	Michael Lembeck	Josh Goldsmith & Cathy Yuspa	Unaired	0110	N/A
Hadley ventures to Chattanooga, Tennessee, escorted by Simon, to pick up her mother's antique armoire. Over dinner, Dolly (Grace Zabriskie) reveals that the promise of the wardrobe was a ruse to get her daughter to attend her wedding the next day, and this news doesn't sit well with Hadley. After visiting the church where she and Simon were wed and reliving their ceremony, Hadley has a change of heart and gives Dolly her blessing. Meanwhile at the hotel, Rose and Yorgo are at each other's throats as they attempt to take care of the kids, who handle the situation more maturely. Guest stars: Jon Menick (Reverend Hughes), Preston Wamsley (Jimmy)

== Reception ==
The show was almost universally critically panned. Matt Roush wrote in his USA Today review that Curry "gives it his maul", and that the show's leads seemed "lost in the TV equivalent of summer stock". Ken Tucker of Entertainment Weekly went one step further, likening it to a variation of The Odd Couple that possessed "neither romantic spark nor crisp verbal byplay". The Los Angeles Daily News claimed it was the worst new show of the season, and that if you tuned in to the show at 8:30, you would "probably be watching something else by 8:38". TeeVee's Peter Ko wrote a lengthy review (which itself got some publicity nine years later) in which he heavily bashed Curry, then he went on to state, "I have stood in a freezer full of dead people at the morgue. I have seen a man's scalp pulled back over his nose. I've even seen 35 minutes of Ellen DeGeneres's Mr. Wrong. But I can now honestly say that until Steve Carell's turn in the premiere of Over the Top, I have never known true horror." The Washington Post's Tom Shales, on the other hand, was substantially kinder than most critics, saying "the show seemed merely okay at first encounter," but after seeing the season's other new shows, "Over the Top is looking better and better. I could almost kiss it right on the lips."

Over the Top debuted opposite the World Series with minuscule promotion to lowest ratings ABC had ever had for a non-rerun-filled Tuesday night, so it was canceled after only three episodes had aired.

Although the complete series barely aired anywhere in the world, all 12 episodes of the show that were filmed (including the original version of the pilot) were subsequently leaked and have been circulating among Curry's fans. Initial copies that surfaced featured Finnish subtitles; dupes of VHS press screeners later began to make the rounds.

The series gained additional interest after Steve Carell became famous and mentioned it several times in interviews, particularly after reading an excerpt of Peter Ko's review during a 2006 Television Critics Association speech.
