= A Family Torn Apart =

1993 TV film directed by Craig R. Baxley

- DVD cover
- Also known as: Sudden Fury
- Genre: Crime drama
- Based on: Sudden Fury: A True Story of Adoption and Murder by Leslie Walker
- Written by: Matthew Bombeck
- Directed by: Craig R. Baxley
- Starring: Neil Patrick Harris; Johnny Galecki
- Music by: Gary Chang
- Country of origin: United States
- Original language: English

Production
- Executive producers: Robert Halmi Sr.; John Levoff; Robert Lovenheim
- Cinematography: João Fernandes
- Editor: Jeff Freeman
- Running time: 98 minutes
- Production companies: RHI Entertainment; River City Productions Inc.

Original release
- Network: NBC
- Release: November 21, 1993

A Family Torn Apart, released on video as Sudden Fury, is a 1993 American crime drama television film directed by Craig R. Baxley, written by Matthew Bombeck, and starring Neil Patrick Harris and Johnny Galecki. The film is based on the 1989 non-fiction book Sudden Fury: A True Story of Adoption and Murder by Leslie Walker. It aired on NBC on November 21, 1993.

== Plot ==
The film begins with an unknown person hiding an axe covered with blood in the woods. It then focuses on Brian Hannigan, a teenager who contacts the police after the death of his adoptive parents, a double homicide. The investigators immediately see Brian as a suspect, because he was in the house when the murders occurred, is thought to have been too calm considering the circumstances, while also claiming to have heard nothing during the night his parents were murdered. Chris Hannigan, Brian's 7-year-old adoptive brother, tells the police that he saw his other adoptive brother, 17-year-old Daniel, an aggressive patient at a mental hospital, walking away from the house only seconds after the tragedy. Although Daniel denies having been at the house around the time of the murder, he becomes the prime suspect.

Tom Kelley is an attorney who believes in the sons' innocence and starts to collect information himself. Brian tells him that he was adopted at age six, shortly before Daniel was adopted as well. He reveals that although they seemed to be the perfect family, their parents were abusive towards Daniel because he was always getting into trouble. Joe frequently sent Daniel into the basement, and Joe physically beat Daniel on a regular basis. Maureen (who had no issue with her husband physically disciplining Daniel) sent Brian out in the backyard during the occurrence. When blood is found on Brian's shoes, the court orders him to be separated from his brothers. He is taken into the Kelley home, much to the fear of Tom's wife Liz. Brian admits that he was always too afraid to speak his mind and describes a conversation between his adoptive mother Maureen and her best friend Barbara, in which Maureen expressed her anger when things do not go the way she wants them to, referring to Daniel's behavior.

Brian describes that Daniel came to him later that day, expressing the hatred he feels towards his parents. He was kicked out of the house shortly after and sent back to foster care. Three months later, Daniel was caught while breaking into a house and ended up in a reform school. Although Maureen became very overprotective of him and her recently adopted son Chris, Brian found a way to secretly contact Daniel. Back in present life, Chris tells the police that the guy walking away from the home after the murder wasn't Daniel, but Brian. Criminal attorney, Ken Pierson, also discovered that according to the phone records from the last three months, a dozen calls were made to Daniel including the night of the murders. Investigators start to think that Brian and Daniel were both responsible for their parents' death. Kelley then meets Barbara, who took Brian to church, and tells him that Brian's birth mother abandoned Brian for days until the state took custody of him putting him into a foster care system like Daniel. Barbara then said that Daniel had five different families and Brian had six. When Kelley tells Brian that the police are going to ask him a lot of questions, he finally reveals what really happened that night.

On the evening before the murder, Brian arrived home late after going out with Lisa Kensington, a girl who is known at school for being promiscuous. His parents found out and reacted furiously, blaming him for becoming just like Daniel. Brian then calls up Daniel who tells Brian to leave the house, but Brian refuses fearing that Maureen and Joe will do the same thing to Chris. Later that night he overheard his parents agreeing about sending him away too. Upset and enraged, he stabbed both his parents in the basement with a butcher knife. Maureen was almost able to get away, but he followed her in the backyard and killed her with an axe without noticing that Chris was watching him from his window. After his confession, Brian stated he never told Daniel about this and that he never told anyone what was happening in the house because whenever he spoke up when he was little, he would get moved. Brian is then arrested and Kelley returns home disappointed.

In the epilogue, it is stated that Brian served eight years in the Patuxent Institution in Maryland while Daniel continued having trouble with the law several times and is sent to prison, and Chris got adopted by a loving family.

== Cast ==
- Neil Patrick Harris as Brian Hannigan
- Johnny Galecki as Daniel Hannigan
- Linda Kelsey as Maureen Hannigan
- John M. Jackson as Joe Hannigan
- Lisa Banes as Barbara Forester
- James Handy as Det. Stockman
- Tim Kelleher as Det. Cahill
- Timothy Bass as Ken Pierson
- Eric Lloyd as Chris Hannigan
- Gregory Harrison as Tom Kelley
- Larry Black as D.A. Norman Crowley
- Rhoda Griffis as Liz Kelley
- Kathy Larson as Lisa Kensington

== Production ==
Filming took place in Atlanta.

== Reception ==
Variety said, "Harris and Galecki also turn in strong, effective performances as the extremely troubled teens, with Harris, who starred as child doctor extraordinaire on "Doogie Howser, M.D.," getting the chance to look downright diabolical."
