= Kowalski (play) =

Stage play by Gregg Ostrin

- Original language: English
- Written by: Gregg Ostrin
- Characters: Tennessee Williams; Marlon Brando; Margo Jones; Pancho; Jo
- Genre: Drama, Comedy
- Setting: A beach cottage Provincetown, Massachusetts, 1947.

Premiere
- Date: June 24, 2011
- Place: The Two Roads Theater, Studio City, California, U.S.

Kowalski is a stage play written by American playwright Gregg Ostrin.

The play tells the story of the casting process behind the classic Tennessee Williams play, A Streetcar Named Desire and the first meeting between Williams and Marlon Brando. Based on real accounts, Williams was staying in Provincetown, Massachusetts during the summer of 1947 and Brando journeyed from New York City to meet him about the role, arriving three days late.

== Synopsis ==
Tennessee Williams and his partner, Amado "Pancho" Rodriguez-Gonzalez, are vacationing in a beach cottage in Provincetown, Massachusetts, along with their friend, director Margo Jones. Williams is in the pre-production process of his new play, A Streetcar Named Desire, which is set to premiere on Broadway that fall. A young actor named Marlon Brando is sent from New York City to meet with Williams, to discuss the role of Stanley Kowalski, the male lead character, he brings along his girlfriend, a young actress named Jo. A battle of wits and personalities ensues over the course of the evening, leading up to Williams casting Brando in the role.

== Original cast and characters ==
Character	Los Angeles	Off-Broadway	Chicago
Character	2011	2025	2026
Tennessee Williams	Curt Bonnem	Robin Lord Taylor	Johnny Galecki
Marlon Brando	Ignacio Serricchio	Brandon Flynn	Jacob Moskovitz
Margo Jones	Alexa Hamilton	Alison Cimmet	Alison Cimmet
Pancho	Les Brandt	Sebastian Treviño	Reece dos Santos
Jo	Sasha Higgins	Ellie Ricker	Ellie Ricker

== Production history ==
=== Los Angeles (2011) ===
The play had its world premiere at The Two Roads Theater in 2011, after being workshopped in Los Angeles under the Coronet Writer's Lab. Previews began June 24, 2011, and the show concluded on October 16, 2011, after multiple extensions. This production was directed by Rick Shaw.

=== Off-Broadway (2025) ===
The play was performed next at the Duke On 42nd Street, Off-Broadway, beginning January 12, 2025, and closing February 23, 2025, after a one week extension due to high ticket sales. The production was directed by Colin Hanlon, with Brandon Flynn portraying Marlon Brando.

=== Chicago (2026) ===
The play then transferred to Chicago, at the Lookingglass Theatre Company. Again directed by Hanlon, with a new lead cast including Johnny Galecki as Tennessee Williams. This production opened September 15, 2026, and is slated to close on November 8, 2026, after extending an additional two weeks due to demand.
