= Leslie Walker (author) =

American author (born 1950s)

Leslie Walker (born in the 1950s) is an author, journalist and college professor who lives in Maryland.

Walker currently is the Knight Visiting Professor in Digital Innovation at the University of Maryland's Philip Merrill College of Journalism. She teaches courses in multimedia journalism, citizen journalism and social media.

From 1991 until 2007, Walker worked for The Washington Post as an editor, columnist and reporter. Her jobs there included a stint as executive editor of Washingtonpost.com and vice president for news at Washingtonpost.Newsweek Interactive. While at the Washington Post, she created and wrote a column about the impact of the Internet on society, business and culture called ".com." It ran in the Post for eight years and was widely republished in other newspapers.

Walker is the author of Sudden Fury: A True Story of Adoption and Murder, a bestselling work of literary nonfiction about a double murder, published by St. Martin's Press. It was made into a television movie starring Neil Patrick Harris and Johnny Galecki in 1993, and released on DVD in 2006.

== Sources ==
- Walker's .com column archive in The Washington Post
- University of Maryland announcement of Walker's hire, 2008
- Sudden Fury movie/book synopsis and credits from Variety
- Walker's faculty page at the University of Maryland
