= Bookies (film) =

- DVD cover
- Directed by: Mark Illsley
- Written by: Michael Bacall
- Produced by: Sabine Müller; Alan Greenspan; Paul Greenstone; Andrea Kreuzhage; Brad Krevoy; Gerhard Schmidt
- Starring: Nick Stahl; Lukas Haas; Johnny Galecki; Rachael Leigh Cook
- Cinematography: Brendan Galvin
- Edited by: Jeff McEvoy
- Music by: Christopher Tyng
- Production company: Intermedia Films
- Distributed by: Metro-Goldwyn-Mayer
- Release date: January 20, 2003 (Sundance)
- Running time: 88 minutes
- Countries: United States; Germany
- Language: English
- Budget: $8.4 million

Bookies is a 2003 coming-of-age black comedy thriller crime drama film written by Michael Bacall and directed by Mark Illsley. It stars Nick Stahl, Lukas Haas, Johnny Galecki, and Rachael Leigh Cook. The story revolves around the lives of four college students.

== Plot ==
Three college students, Toby, Casey, and Jude, start up a bookie business taking bets from various clients. Their business immediately booms, arousing suspicion among local campus authorities and Toby's girlfriend, Hunter. They subsequently are able to purchase many expensive items such as big-screen televisions and new computers to help them manage their complex business. When their business takes off, Jude receives threats from two local Italian bookies to back down because of their territories for the business overlap.

When a plan by Jude fails to materialize when betting on the college's team to win the game, Toby devises a way to eliminate the threat from the other bookies and get them out of the business. Jude makes a bet with the two Italian bookies, letting them choose whatever game and winner they want, which ends up being a boxing match. Knowing the match would be fixed, Jude and the others liquidate all of their assets and bet all of their earnings on the boxing match. The underdog on which they placed the bet won. Some money went to pay off the Italian bookies, while the remaining spoils were divided amongst the three.

Jude drops out of school and Toby says that "he wasn't the first genius to flunk out of college." Casey changes his major, gets new friends, makes the dean's list, and doesn't see Toby much. Toby continues at college and uses his money to get through grad school. He plays Hunter in a foosball match to win another chance with her after having lost her love through the ordeal.

In a post credits scene, the two Italian bookies are seen arguing as they struggle to start a chainsaw, to kill a man previously unseen in the film whom they abducted and had placed in their car's trunk. The film ends as the two get the chainsaw started.

== Cast ==
- Nick Stahl as Toby Winter
- Lukas Haas as Casey Young
- Johnny Galecki as Jude Petra
- Rachael Leigh Cook as Hunter McGuire
- David Proval as Larry
- John Diehl as Vincent
- Julio Oscar Mechoso as Martinez
- Zuri Williams as Duane
- Dwight Armstrong as Abraham
- Steve Hudson as Julius Garrett
- Errol Trotman-Harewood as Professor Felix
- Catherine Britton as Tammy

== Reception ==
Bookies received mixed to positive reviews. On the review aggregator website Rotten Tomatoes, 67% of six critics' reviews are positive, with an average rating of 6.2/10.
