= Billy (1992 TV series) =

- Genre: Sitcom
- Created by: Michael Elias; Rich Eustis
- Starring: Billy Connolly; Marie Marshall; Johnny Galecki; Natanya Ross; Clara Bryant
- Composer: Ed Alton
- Country of origin: United States
- Original language: English
- No. of seasons: 1
- No. of episodes: 13

Production
- Executive producers: Michael Elias; Rich Eustis; Billy Connolly
- Producers: Ray Jessel; Frank Pace; Rebecca Parr; Ehrich Von Lowe
- Editor: Jimmy B. Frazier
- Camera setup: Multi-camera
- Running time: 30 minutes
- Production companies: Eustis/Elias Productions; Warner Bros. Television

Original release
- Network: ABC
- Release: January 31 – May 30, 1992

Billy is an American sitcom and a spin-off of Head of the Class that aired on ABC for half a season from January 31 to May 30, 1992. (Reruns continued until July 4, 1992). The series starred Billy Connolly as Billy MacGregor, a Scottish teacher who moves to America in order to build a new life for himself.

== Synopsis ==
Following the end of Head of the Class, Billy moves to Berkeley, California, after Filmore High School was closed down, where he marries Mary Springer (played by Marie Marshall), a single mom with several children, so he could get his green card. The marriage is arranged in order to prevent Billy from being deported back to the U.K. Billy becomes Mary's boarder, living in her basement apartment with the strictest of rules: no drinking, no smoking, no pets, and no sex.

The series follows Billy's misadventures as he adjusts to life in California while staying one step ahead of immigration officials seeking to prove his marriage is a sham. Meanwhile, his relationship with Mary's children, 14-year-old David, 10-year-old Laura and 5-year-old Annie, (played by Johnny Galecki, Natanya Ross, and Clara Bryant) deepens to a parental level, and Billy and Mary likewise find themselves drawing closer together, although the series was cancelled before this subplot could be carried out.

== Cast ==
- Billy Connolly as Billy MacGregor
- Marie Marshall as Mary Springer MacGregor
- Johnny Galecki as David MacGregor
- Natanya Ross as Laura MacGregor
- Clara Bryant as Annie MacGregor

== Scheduling and cancellation ==
Billy premiered as part of ABC's TGIF lineup, Fridays at 9:30/8:30c. After two months in this time period, the show moved to Saturday night (just one week after ABC abruptly ended the failed TGIF sister lineup, I Love Saturday Night), at 8:30/7:30c. While on Saturdays, the program would switch time slots a few more times, but none of the moves produced better ratings; Billy folded after one season.

== Episodes ==
No.	Title	Directed by	Written by	Original release date	US viewers (millions)
1	"Pilot"	Sam Weisman	Michael Elias & Rich Eustis	January 31, 1992	18.0
2	"Hot Stuff"	Howard Storm	Rebecca Parr & David Hurwitz & Erich Von Lowe	February 7, 1992	15.7
3	"Parenting 101"	Robert Berlinger	Story by : George Tricker; Teleplay by : Diane Wilk & Joyce Costanza & Larry Moskowitz	February 14, 1992	13.7
4	"Poker Face"	Peter Baldwin	Rich Eustis & Michael Elias & Ray Jessel	February 21, 1992	13.8
5	"Billy Gets the Bird"	John Bowab	Erich Von Lowe	February 28, 1992	16.0
6	"Gimme Some Credit"	Robert Berlinger	Story by : Ehrich Von Lowe; Teleplay by : Bill Lawrence & Ray Jessel	March 6, 1992	18.2
7	"Futile Attraction"	John Bowab	Diane Wilk	March 13, 1992	16.1
8	"Billy Flunks Mary"	Howard Storm	David Hurwitz	March 21, 1992	11.8
9	"Out All Night"	Richard Kline	John Boni	March 28, 1992	11.7
10	"Home Alone, Almost"	Howard Storm	David Hurwitz	April 4, 1992	11.6
11	"Love Me or Leave Me: Part 1"	John Bowab	April Kelly	April 11, 1992	10.2
12	"Love Me or Leave Me: Part 2"	John Bowab	Rebecca Parr	April 18, 1992	9.2
13	"Thunder from Down Under"	Howard Storm	Geoff Gilbert & Gregg Sherman	May 30, 1992	8.8

== Bibliography ==
- Tim Brooks and Earle Marsh, The Complete Directory to Prime Time Network and Cable TV Shows 1946–Present, Ninth edition (New York: Ballantine Books, 2007) ISBN 978-0-345-49773-4
- Michael Ausiello, TV Guide: Guide to TV, (New York: Barnes & Noble, 2005) ISBN 0-7607-7572-9
