= Natanya Ross =

American actress (born 1981)

- Born: Natanya Beth Ross; October 4, 1981 (age 44); Asbury Park, New Jersey, U.S.
- Occupation: Actress
- Years active: 1984–present

Natanya Beth Ross (born October 4, 1981, in Asbury Park, New Jersey) is an American actress who is most famous for playing Robyn Russo, a regular character in The Secret World of Alex Mack.

== Career ==
Ross first got her start in TV by doing a commercial for McDonald's. After appearing in New York theatre productions, Ross moved with her mother to California to pursue a career in film and television. She was quickly cast in the TV series Billy. In 1994, she was hired in a supporting role in The Secret World of Alex Mack and remained on the show for four years. She later starred in the 1995 television version of Freaky Friday and the movie The Baby-Sitters Club. Natanya also played the character Kelly in the 1999 movie Bellyfruit. She was last seen in a 2000 episode of Boston Public.

== Personal life ==
At the age of eighteen, Ross willingly stepped away from her acting career.

The period of her 20s were marked with considerable turmoil as she fell into drug addiction, eventually ending up homeless on skid row. Following the death of her boyfriend Brad Renfro, Ross focused on maintaining her sobriety. She eventually began working within the drug rehabilitation industry, serving on the board of W.A.A.T. (Women’s Association of Addiction) while also advocating for the homeless with her non-profit San Fernando Valley Feed the Homeless.

In her 30s, Ross discovered she was adopted and subsequently found out she had three siblings from the same mother. Ross is in a long-term relationship with actor Nate Richert.

== Filmography ==
Year	Film/TV Series	Role	Notes
1989	Little Monsters	Kid on Trial	Film
1992	Billy	Laura MacGregor	TV series, 13 episodes
1993	Step by Step	Kid #2	TV series, episode "Video-Mania"
1993	Sunny's Deliverance	(voice)	Short film
1993	Opera Vegetables	Holley Mark	TV movie, along with 15 child actors and 15 child actresses
1994	Viper	Kimberly	TV series, episode "Thief of Hearts"
1994	Munchie Strikes Back	Jennifer	
1994	Boy Meets World	Ingrid Iverson	TV series, episode "Turnaround"
1995	ER	Mandy Horn	TV series, episode "Long Day's Journey"
1995	Freaky Friday	Jackie	TV movie, Walt Disney Television
1995	The Babysitters Club	Grace Blume	Film
1996	The Faculty	Wendy	TV series, episode "Carlos Garcia"
1996	Shadow Zone: The Undead Express	Gabe	TV movie
1996–2003	Arthur	Children's Sitcom Laughter (voice)	TV series, unknown episodes
1997	Baywatch	Meagan	TV series, episode "Chance of a Lifetime"
1997	Over the Top	Gwen	TV series, pilot episode
1994–1998	The Secret World of Alex Mack	Robyn Russo	TV series, 65 episodes
1999	Beverly Hills, 90210	Marianne Plague	TV series, episode "Survival Skills"
1999	Bellyfruit	Kelly	Film
2000	Boston Public	Singer	TV series, episode "Chapter Six"
2016	Dead of Night	Charla Woodruff	TV series
2024	Wrath Mercy	Irina	Short film
2026	The Fantastic Santa Monaco	Deb Miller	
