= Munchie =

1992 American comedy movie

- DVD cover
- Directed by: Jim Wynorski
- Written by: Michael Hitchcock; Jim Wynorski
- Produced by: Mike Elliott
- Starring: Loni Anderson; Andrew Stevens; Jaime McEnnan; Arte Johnson; Dom DeLuise
- Cinematography: Don E. Fauntleroy
- Edited by: Rick Gentner
- Music by: Chuck Cirino
- Distributed by: New Concorde
- Release date: May 15, 1992 (Tennessee)
- Running time: 80 minutes
- Country: United States
- Language: English

Munchie is a 1992 American low budget fantasy comedy film directed by Jim Wynorski. The film stars Andrew Stevens, Loni Anderson, Dom DeLuise and Jennifer Love Hewitt in her film debut. The film was released in Tennessee on May 15, 1992.

== Plot ==
Gage Dobson is a young boy dealing with various problems in his life. He is constantly bullied at school, his divorced mother, Cathy, is dating the "creep" Dr. Elliot Carlisle with whom Gage has a mutual hatred, and the girl he adores, Andrea, doesn't seem to know he exists. Gage's only friend is Professor Cruikshank, whom everyone considers a crackpot. After wandering into an abandoned mine, Gage finds a creature that calls itself Munchie. Gage runs home, frightened by the creature, only to find that Munchie has followed him home. Munchie explains to his new "pal" that he has magical powers and can help him out with the problems in his life.

Munchie's "help," however, only causes Gage more trouble. Munchie helps him get revenge on the school bullies but he also helps to embarrass the school principal, who threatens Gage with expulsion. Fed up with Munchie's machinations, Gage takes him to Cruikshank, who reveals that Munchie is an eternal creature that has been in every major civilization since time began. Gage leaves Munchie with Cruikshank, only to have Munchie return to his house and put together a huge party while Cathy and Dr. Carlisle are on a date. The party is a big hit; Gage's principal, who attends, tells him he won't have to worry about expulsion, and Andrea and Gage finally get a chance to talk and they hit it off well.

While Cathy and Carlisle are on their date, Carlisle manages to disgust her with his sexist attitudes and she demands he take her home early. They arrive and find the party in full swing. Cathy is furious with Gage, but when Carlisle finds a sleeping Munchie, he kidnaps him to take him to his office for experiments. With the help of Andrea and Cruikshank, Gage manages to get Munchie back and a chase ensues, culminating with Carlisle crashing into a donut shop and being arrested by nearby cops.

Munchie leaves to join Cruikshank on a foreign expedition, promising Gage that they'll see each other again someday.

== Cast ==
- Dom DeLuise as Munchie (voice)
- Loni Anderson as Cathy Dobson, Gage's single mother
- Andrew Stevens as Elliot Carlisle
- Jaime McEnnan as Gage L. Dobson
- Arte Johnson as Professor Cruikshank
- Love Hewitt as Andrea Kurtz, Gage's love interest
- Scott Ferguson as Ashton, Gage's rival
- Mike Simmrin as Leon Daggett, Gage's bully and Ashton's friend
- Toni Naples as Mrs. Blaylok, Gage's teacher
- Ace Mask as Principal Thornton, Gage's principal
- Monique Gabrielle as Miss Laurel, Thornton's assistant
- Angus Scrimm as Undertaker
- Lenny Juliano as P.E. Teacher
- Jay Richardson as Mr. Kurtz
- Fred Olen Ray as Piano Player
- Brinke Stevens as Band Member
- George Buck Flower as Rich Tramp

== Production ==
Munchie had an 18-day shooting schedule. Director Jim Wynorski spoke about working with actress Jennifer Love Hewitt, that working with her led to him writing Little Miss Millions, specifically for Hewitt who made her debut role in this film.

== Release ==
Munchie received a theatrical release in Tennessee at Bell Forge 10 cinema on May 15, 1992. It was released on home video in June. The film was released on Blu-ray in a double feature set on November 27, 2018 by Shout Factory.

== Reception ==
From contemporary reviews, Lawrence Cohn of Variety stated that the film was poor in comparison to its influence (Gremlins as well as Critters and Ghoulies) but that "Wynorski's pacy direction and frequent sight gags keep things moving in entertaining fashion." In the 1993 Motion Picture Guide Annual, Charles Cassidy Jr. described the film as a "Disney manque" that was "inoffensive as far as it goes, but hardly worth the talent involved". The review noted that Wynorski and R.J. Robertson "often season their celluloid junk food with warped humor" and happen to "give Gage some funny day dream fantasies, but those abruptly cease" and that Chuck Cirino's music theme "is a pleasant little tune that's the nearest to magic this production ever gets."

Munchie was followed by Munchie Strikes Back in 1994.

== Sources ==
- Aronson, Virginia (2000). Jennifer Love Hewitt. Chelsea House Publisher. ISBN 0-7910-5497-7.
- Cassidy, Charles Jr. (1993). The Motion Picture Guide: 1993 Annual (The Films of 1992). Baseline. ISBN 0-918432-95-2.
- Cohn, Lawrence (June 10, 1992). "Munchie". Variety.
