= Robert Morton (producer) =

American television producer

Robert Morton is an American television producer most notable for his work as a producer and later co-executive producer of the NBC program Late Night with David Letterman.

== Biography ==
Morton is a 1975 graduate of American University (Washington, DC). He served as the creative director for MTV prior to joining David Letterman's staff.

Morton went with Letterman to CBS in 1993 and was the executive producer of CBS' Late Show with David Letterman; he left the show in 1996. After leaving the Late Show Morton produced several programs, including Drew Carey's Green Screen Show, The Wayne Brady Show, Over the Top, and Mind of Mencia. He returned to late-night television becoming the executive producer of Lopez Tonight on TBS in 2010.

== Personal life ==
In 2001, he married restaurateur Jennifer Rush; they have two daughters, Billie Morton (b. 2001) and Emmy Morton (b. 2006). They divorced in 2016.
