= The Wayne Brady Show =

Television series

- Genre: Variety show
- Starring: Wayne Brady; Brooke Dillman; J. P. Manoux; Marjorie Johnson
- Country of origin: United States
- Original language: English
- No. of seasons: 3

Production
- Running time: 22 minutes (2001–2002); 42 minutes (2002–2004)
- Production companies: Makin' it Up Productions (2002–2004); Panamort Television (2002–2004); Brad Grey Television (2001–2004); Don Mischer Productions (2001–2002); Touchstone Television (2001–2002); Enjoy the Ride Productions Ltd. (2002–2004)

Original release
- Network: ABC (2001–2002); Syndicated (2002–2004)
- Release: August 8, 2001 – May 21, 2004

The Wayne Brady Show is an American variety show hosted by comedian Wayne Brady that aired in two separate forms.

On August 8, 2001, ABC, for whom Brady had been working as a panelist on Whose Line Is It Anyway?, launched the first Wayne Brady Show as a primetime variety series that failed to catch on and was cancelled in March 2002.

Later that fall, plans to bring the show back as a daily syndicated daytime series came to fruition and The Wayne Brady Show premiered on local stations nationwide on September 2, 2002. Although the show was a hit at the start, the ratings began sliding during the first season and continued into its second, and on May 21, 2004, The Wayne Brady Show aired its final episode.

== Awards ==
During its time in syndication, it was nominated for several awards:

=== Won ===
- Daytime Emmy Award:
  - Outstanding Achievement in Live & Direct to Tape Sound Mixing (2003)
  - Outstanding Directing in a Talk Show (2003)
  - Outstanding Talk Show (2003) (tied with The View)
  - Outstanding Talk Show Host (2003)
  - Outstanding Talk Show Host (2004)
- American Choreography Award:
  - Outstanding Achievement in Television – Variety or Special (2003)

=== Nominated ===
- Daytime Emmy Award:
  - Outstanding Achievement in Main Title Design (2004)
  - Outstanding Achievement in Multiple Camera Editing (2004)
  - Outstanding Achievement in Music Direction and Composition (2004)
  - Outstanding Directing in a Talk Show (2004)
  - Outstanding Talk Show (2004)
