= Mark Illsley =

American film director

- Born: June 4, 1958 (age 68); United States
- Occupations: Film director, screenwriter

Mark Illsley (born June 4, 1958) is a film director best known for writing and directing the film Happy, Texas, which starred William H. Macy and Steve Zahn, and directing Bookies.

Illsley was raised in Santa Rosa, California where he made films as a teen with a Super-8 camera. He graduated from the USC School of Cinema-Television in 1981, where he met and started working relationship with Kevin Reynolds.

Happy, Texas triggered a bidding war that played out at the 1999 Sundance Film Festival, with Harvey Weinstein and Miramax beating out other suitors, which included Fox Searchlight, Paramount Classics and New Line Cinema.

He married his wife Jill Zimmerman on September 29, 2001. They divorced in 2016. He is the son of Rolf Illsley
