= Late Night with David Letterman =

American late-night talk show (1982–1993)

- Also known as: Late Night (franchise brand)
- Genre: Late-night talk show; Variety; Comedy
- Created by: David Letterman
- Written by: Merrill Markoe (head writer: 1982); Jim Downey (head writer: 1982–1983); Steve O'Donnell (head writer: 1983–1992); Rob Burnett (head writer: 1992–1993)
- Presented by: David Letterman
- Announcer: Bill Wendell
- Music by: Paul Shaffer and The World's Most Dangerous Band
- Opening theme: "Late Night Theme"
- Composer: Paul Shaffer
- Country of origin: United States
- Original language: English
- No. of seasons: 11
- No. of episodes: 1,819

Production
- Executive producers: Jack Rollins (1982–1992); Barry Sand (1982–1988); David Letterman (1987–1993); Robert Morton (1987–1993); Peter Lassally (1992–1993)
- Production locations: Studio 6A, NBC Studios, New York, New York
- Camera setup: Multi-camera
- Running time: 42–43 minutes
- Production companies: Carson Productions; Space Age Meats Productions (1982–1990); Worldwide Pants (1990–93); NBC Productions

Original release
- Network: NBC
- Release: February 1, 1982 – June 25, 1993

Related
- The David Letterman Show; Late Show with David Letterman

Late Night with David Letterman is an American television talk show broadcast by NBC. The show is the first installment of Late Night. Hosted by David Letterman, it aired from February 1, 1982 to June 25, 1993, and was replaced by Late Night with Conan O'Brien.

In 2013, this series and Late Show with David Letterman were ranked No. 41 on TV Guide's 60 Best Series of All Time. During its run, the show was nominated for the Primetime Emmy Award for Outstanding Variety Series 11 times. It was also nominated for the Primetime Emmy Award for Outstanding Writing for a Variety Series 14 times, winning 4, and won one Primetime Emmy Award for Outstanding Directing for a Variety Series out of 7 nominations.

Late Night originated from NBC Studio 6A at the RCA (later GE) Building at 30 Rockefeller Plaza in New York City. The program ran four nights a week, Monday to Thursday, from the show's premiere on February 1, 1982, until June 4, 1987. Friday shows were added on June 12, 1987, although the show still only produced four new episodes a week. Monday's shows were re-runs. NBC previously aired Friday Night Videos in the 12:30 a.m. slot on Saturday morning, with occasional Late Night specials and reruns. Friday Night Videos was reduced to an hour's length and moved up an hour to 1:30 a.m. on Saturday morning.

Starting on September 2, 1991, The Tonight Show Starring Johnny Carson was pushed back from 11:30 p.m. to 11:35 p.m., with Letterman starting at 12:35 a.m., at the request of NBC affiliates who wanted more advertising time for their profitable late newscasts.

Like The Tonight Show in the 1980s and early 1990s, Late Night aired annual anniversary specials. They aired on or about February 1, first in its own timeslot (albeit on a Friday, preempting SCTV). From 1984 to 1987, episodes of Saturday Night Live were preempted for the special. Finally, from 1988 to 1990 and in 1992, the special aired in prime time, after Cheers. There were no anniversary specials in 1991 and 1993. (Letterman would leave NBC later in 1993.) David Letterman's Holiday Film Festival also aired in Saturday Night Live's timeslot over Thanksgiving weekend in 1985, before a second and final installment aired in prime time the Friday after Thanksgiving in 1986. The festivals were a collection of shorts starring, directed and/or written by celebrities.

== History ==
In the wake of his NBC morning show being cancelled in October 1980 after 18 weeks on the air, David Letterman was still held in high enough regard by the network brass, especially NBC president Fred Silverman, that upon hearing the 33-year-old comedian was being courted by a first-run syndication company, NBC gave him a US$20,000 per week ($1,000,000 for a year) deal to sit out a year and guest-host The Tonight Show Starring Johnny Carson on multiple occasions. Earlier that year in May, after significant acrimony, NBC and Carson had reached an agreement on a new contract, which—among other concessions to Carson—granted the powerful and influential host the control over the time slot immediately following The Tonight Show.

From late fall 1980 until the end of 1981, in addition to guest-hosting 22 episodes of the Tonight Show, as outlined in his one-year holding deal with NBC, Letterman also appeared five times as Carson's guest on the highly rated program as the network groomed the 34-year-old for a new project.

Finally, on November 9, 1981, NBC and Carson's production company Carson Productions (as well as Letterman's own newly established production company Space Age Meats Productions, forerunner to his subsequent production entity Worldwide Pants Incorporated) announced the creation of Late Night with David Letterman, set to premiere in early 1982 in the 12:30 a.m. time slot Monday through Thursday, with occasional specials every few Fridays, all aimed at young men. The network wanted to capitalize on catering to young males, feeling that there was very little late-night programming for that demographic. The newly announced show thus displaced the Tomorrow Coast to Coast program hosted by Tom Snyder from the 12:30 slot. NBC initially offered Snyder to move his show back an hour, but Snyder—already unhappy with being forced to adopt changes to Tomorrow that he detested—refused and ended the show instead. The final first-run Tomorrow episode aired on December 17, 1981.

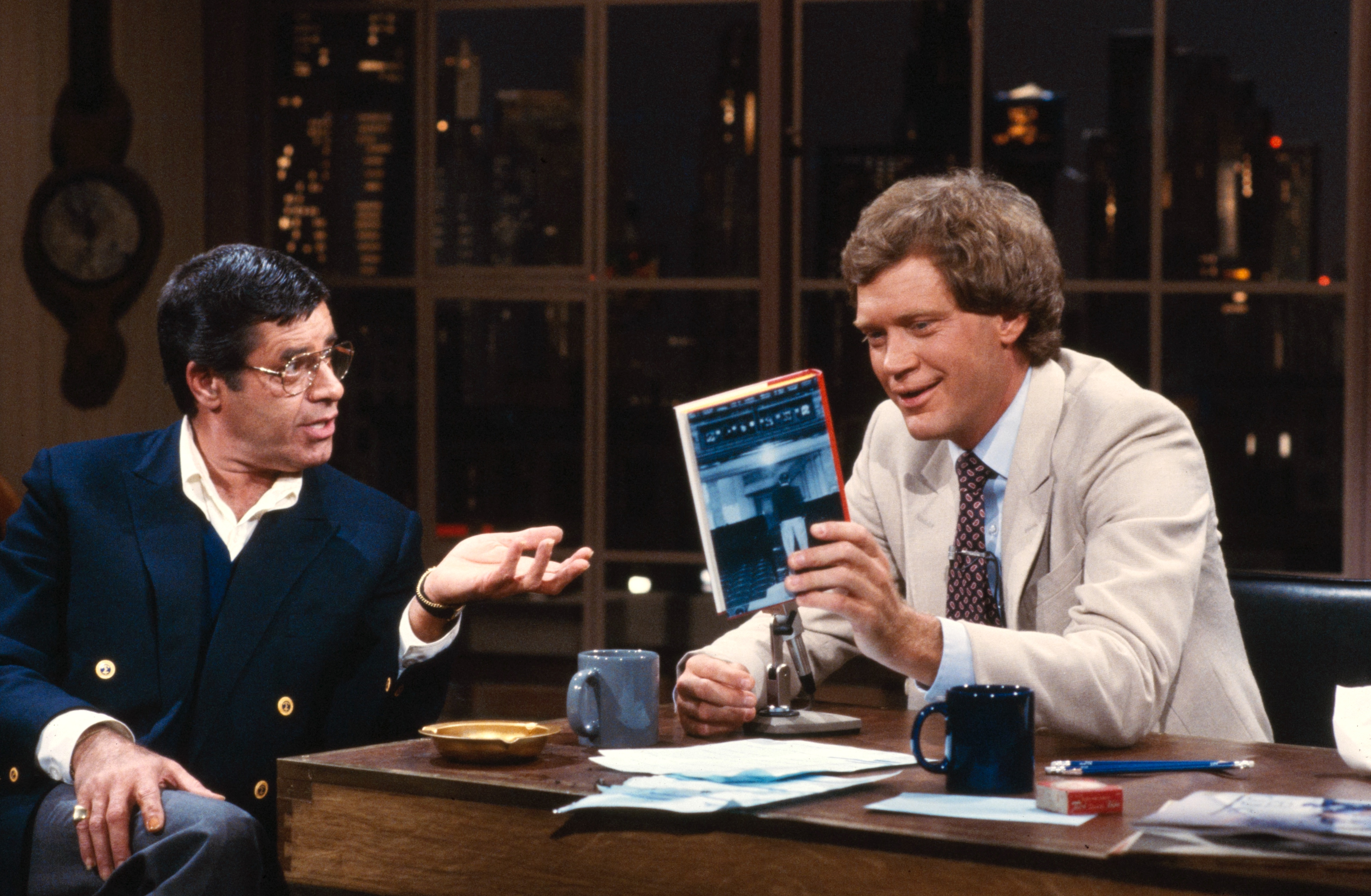
Actor Jerry Lewis with Letterman on Late Night, 1982

=== Debut ===
The staff responsible for preparing the launch of Late Night included Letterman's girlfriend Merrill Markoe in the head writing role, seasoned TV veteran Hal Gurnee as director, Letterman's manager Jack Rollins as executive producer, and a group of young writers—most of them in their early twenties, along with the somewhat more experienced 29-year-old Jim Downey, who had previously written for Saturday Night Live, and 27-year-old Steve O'Donnell. Also on board, at first as a production assistant in charge of the "Stupid Pet Tricks" segment, was 21-year-old Chris Elliott. Elliott would quickly be promoted to writer and a recurring featured player. Initially, just like previously with Letterman's morning show, most creative aspects of Late Night rested on the tight bond between Letterman and Markoe whose personal relationship had been encountering issues during the 1980-1981 period. However, with a new show to launch, the newly reconciled couple moved into the Surrey Hotel, off Madison Avenue in Manhattan, with their two dogs, and resumed their business and personal relationship.

The plan from the start was to resurrect the spirit of Letterman's morning show for a late-night audience, one more likely to plug into its offbeat humor. The show also got a house band, hiring NBC staff musician Paul Shaffer to lead the group. They were informally dubbed "The World's Most Dangerous Band" in early episodes, but this was then dropped for several years; through much of the show's run, the band existed without a formal name. The moniker "The World's Most Dangerous Band" was reinstated in 1988, and continued through the rest of the show.

Realizing that NBC executives exhibited very little desire to micromanage various aspects of the show, the staff felt confident they would be allowed to push outside of the mainstream talk-show boundaries and thus set about putting together a quirky, absurdist, and odd program. Snyder's Tomorrow re-runs continued until Thursday, January 28, 1982, and four days later on Monday, February 1, 1982, Late Night premiered with a cold opening featuring Larry "Bud" Melman delivering lines as an homage to the prologue of Boris Karloff's Frankenstein, followed by Letterman coming out on stage to Tchaikovsky's "Piano Concerto No. 1" behind a group of female dancers—the peacock girls who had also opened the finale of The David Letterman Show. After a brief monologue, the very first comedy segment was a sarcastic tour of the studio. The first guest, 31-year-old comedian and actor Bill Murray, came out in confrontational fashion, throwing jibes and accusations at the host as part of a knowing put-on. He remained for two more similarly sardonic segments in which he first presented footage of a Chinese zoo baby panda as a supposed home video of his recently adopted pet, before expressing newfound love for aerobics and pulling a crew member onstage, making her do jumping jacks along with him to Olivia Newton-John's "Physical". The second comedy piece was a remote titled "The Shame of the City"; taking a general format of a local news action segment, it featured Letterman touring several New York locations pointing out various civic problems with righteous indignation. The second guest was Don Herbert, TV's "Mr. Wizard", and the show ended with a young comic named Steve Fessler reciting aloud the script of the obscure Bela Lugosi film Bowery at Midnight.

On the third night, after baseball great Hank Aaron finished his interview segment with Letterman, a camera followed him backstage, where TV sportscaster Al Albert conducted a post-interview chat with Aaron about how it had gone. Eccentric and awkward, the show immediately established a sensibility that was clearly different from The Tonight Show.

The reviews were mixed. Los Angeles Times wrote: "Much of Letterman's first week did not jell". Associated Press television writer Fred Rothenberg's effusive review declared the new program a direct descendent of Steve Allen's Tonight Show, finding its spontaneity and surprise a "welcome liberation from conventional talk shows" while praising Letterman as a "sensational ad-libber" whose "comic genius lies in finding humor in the mundane and in the incongruous". The show drew 1.5 million viewers, 30% more than had tuned in for Snyder's Tomorrow.

The show was produced by Johnny Carson's production company, as a result of a clause in Carson's contract with NBC that gave him control of what immediately followed The Tonight Show Starring Johnny Carson. Carson, for his part, wanted Late Night to have as little overlap with his show as possible. In fact, most ground rules and restrictions on what Letterman could do came not from the network but from the production company itself. Letterman could not have a sidekick like Ed McMahon, and Paul Shaffer's band could not include a horn section like Doc Severinsen's. Letterman was told he could not book old-school showbiz guests such as James Stewart, George Burns, or Buddy Hackett, who were fixtures on Johnny's show (the fact that Tonight had long moved to Hollywood and Late Night was taped in New York helped minimize guest overlap). Letterman was also specifically instructed not to replicate any of the signature pieces of The Tonight Show Starring Johnny Carson like "Stump the Band" or "Carnac the Magnificent". Carson also wanted Letterman to minimize the number of topical jokes in his opening monologue.

Markoe stepped down as head writer during fall 1982, continuing on as a staff writer, thus reducing her workload reportedly in hopes of preserving her personal relationship with Letterman, which had become difficult again when blended with the daily work grind. She was succeeded by Downey who was in turn succeeded by O'Donnell in 1983. O'Donnell would serve as the head writer through most of the rest of the show's run while Downey went back to Saturday Night Live in 1984.

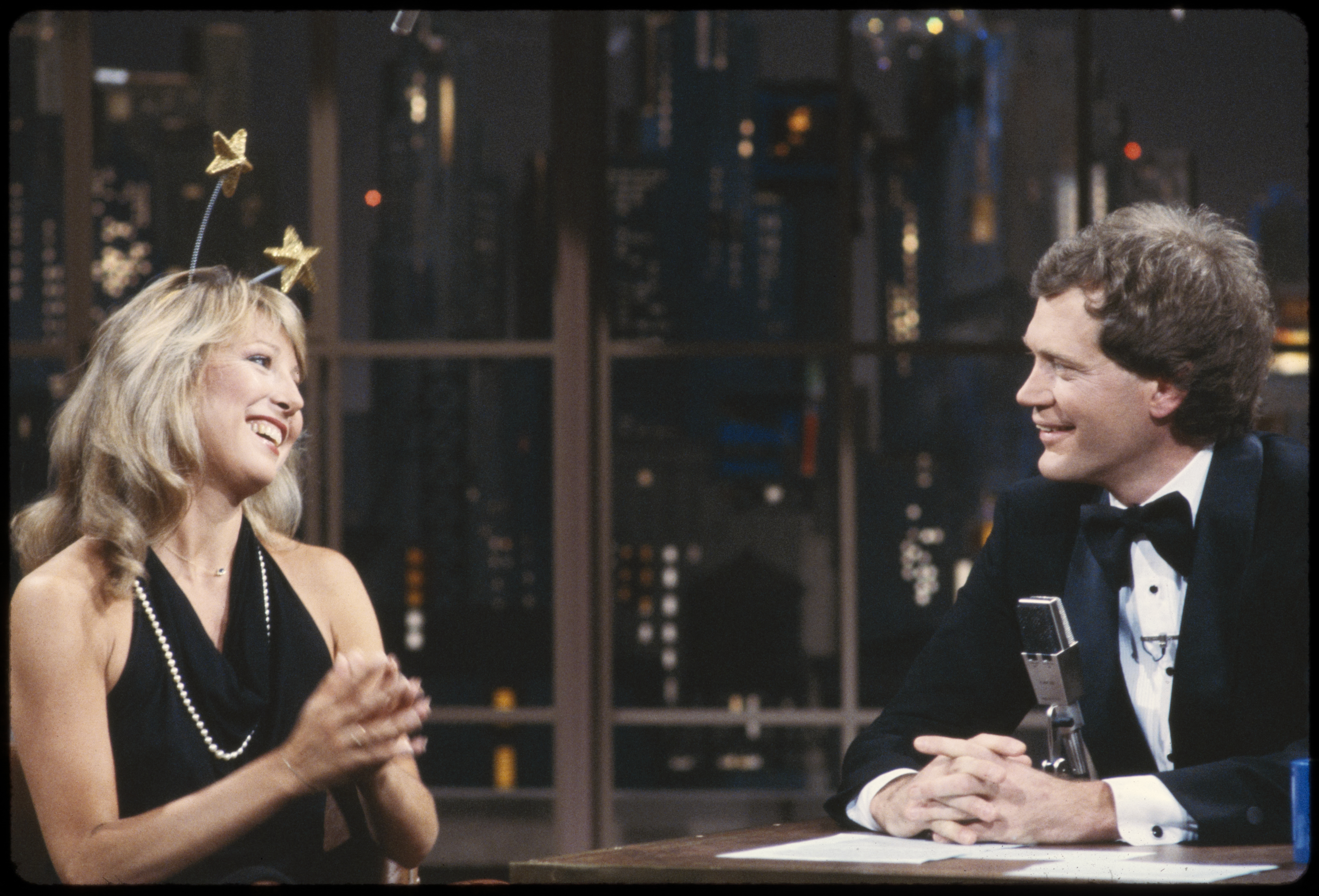
Letterman interviewing Teri Garr in 1982.

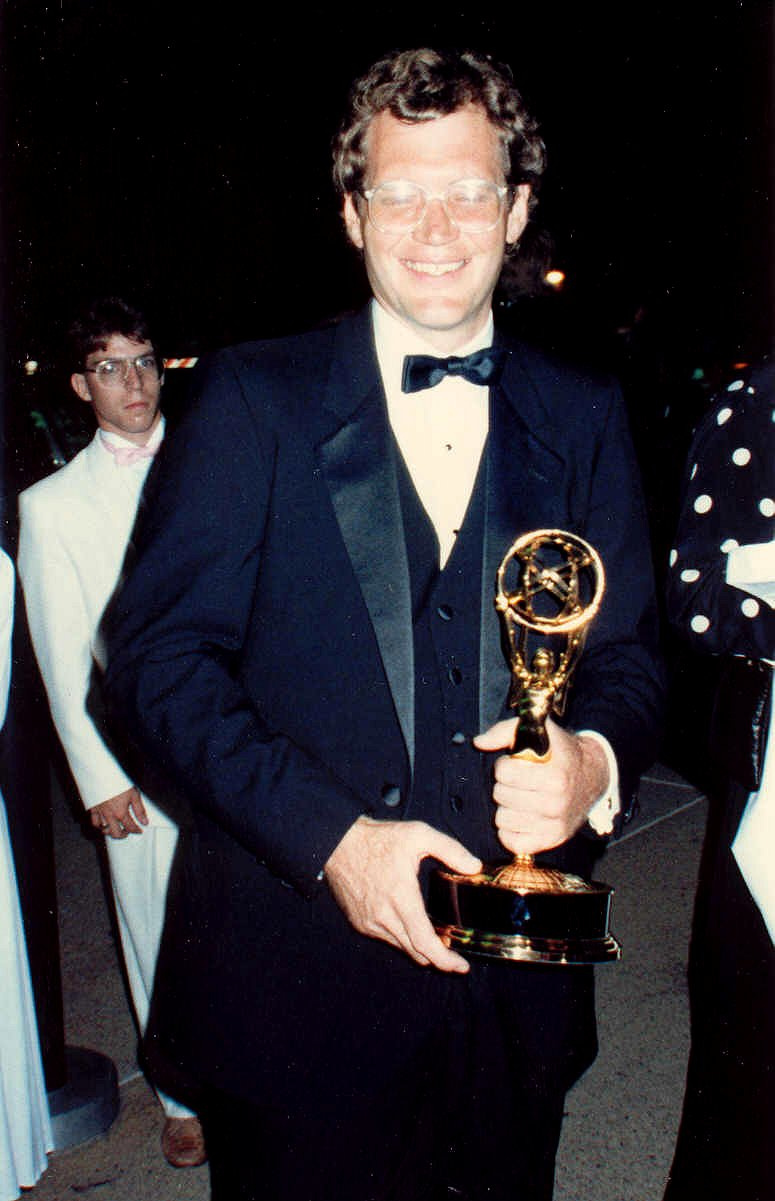
Letterman at the 1987 Emmy Awards.

=== Passed over as Carson's successor on The Tonight Show ===
On May 23, 1991, at a meeting of NBC affiliate managers at Carnegie Hall in New York City, Johnny Carson announced that he would leave The Tonight Show the following year, at the conclusion of its 30th season. Carson had hosted the program since 1962 and assumed control of its production in 1980. His relationship with NBC had reportedly become strained, and his decision to announce his departure publicly before informing the network was interpreted by some observers as a sign of the tension between the two parties. Several hours after the announcement, Carson made an unannounced appearance on Late Night with David Letterman, where he spoke with Letterman in a conversation that was viewed by some as a symbolic passing of the torch.

Two weeks later, however, NBC released a statement that Jay Leno (Carson's guest-host since 1987) would become Carson's replacement, not David Letterman. Though revealed two weeks after Carson's retirement announcement, the network's decision to go with Leno rather than Letterman had reportedly already been made for a long time, primarily by two of the top executives in NBC's Entertainment division: its president Warren Littlefield and his close collaborator John Agoglia, president of NBC Enterprises. In fact, Leno and his manager Helen Kushnick had even struck a deal with the network—signed on May 16, 1991 in NBC's Burbank headquarters—that guaranteed them The Tonight Show as soon as Carson stepped down. The two-week delay in announcing Leno as Carson's replacement reportedly took place due to Littlefield's and Agoglia's desire to fly to New York City in order to personally inform Letterman as the network sought to put its relationship with their 12:30 a.m. host into some sort of order before making the decision public via a press release.

Considerations such as Leno's 4.6 million households ratings on the nights he filled in for Carson over the previous six months being virtually identical to the show's overall viewership numbers during that period (but with a younger and more ethnically diverse audience than Carson's) as well as the fact that Letterman's show was a solid hit at 12:30 a.m. making the network some $20 million to $30 million in annual revenue reportedly all contributed to NBC naming Leno as Carson's successor while making Letterman stay put. A New York Times piece as part of the paper's late-night television beat quoted an unnamed NBC late-night executive claiming that the decision "wasn't that hard" since "Leno is more mainstream while Letterman has more a niche program, a cult program". The network was also rumored to have used the Q-ratings surveys in order to aid them in making the final decision, reportedly determining at the time that Leno's Q-rating was a considerable eight points higher than Letterman's, and was slightly even higher than Carson's.

=== Syndication on A&E ===
On September 30, 1991, A&E, an American cable channel partly owned by General Electric—also NBC's parent company—began broadcasting repeats of Late Night Monday-through-Friday at 7 p.m. in an effort of monetizing the show's vast accumulation of old episodes. The repeats aired for less than a year, until July 24, 1992. The syndication deal had been brokered without Letterman's knowledge, and he frequently made his displeasure of the arrangement known on-air, feeling that having reruns broadcast five nights a week, earlier in the evening on cable, diluted the value of the nightly first-run shows on NBC—fearing people would not be willing to stay up late for the first-run if they could watch repeats of the program at an earlier time. Because of Letterman's opposition, the syndication run was ended early and not attempted again until after he had left NBC.

=== Letterman moves to CBS ===
Letterman, who had hoped to get the hosting job of The Tonight Show following Johnny Carson's retirement, moved to CBS in 1993 when the job was given to Jay Leno. This was done against the wishes of Carson, who had always seen Letterman as his rightful successor, according to CBS senior vice president Peter Lassally, a one-time producer for both men. Letterman announced the move on January 14, 1993. On April 25, 1993, Lorne Michaels chose Conan O'Brien, who was a writer for The Simpsons at the time and a former writer for Michaels at Saturday Night Live, to fill Letterman's old seat directly after The Tonight Show. O'Brien began hosting a new show in Letterman's old timeslot, taking over the Late Night name on September 13, 1993.

When Letterman left, NBC asserted their intellectual property rights to several of the most popular Late Night segments. Letterman easily adapted to these restrictions for his CBS show: The "Viewer Mail" segment was continued under the name "CBS Mailbag," and Late Night fixture Larry "Bud" Melman continued his antics under his real name, Calvert DeForest. Similarly, the in-house band (now free to add horns) was unable to use the name "The World's Most Dangerous Band," so the name was changed to "Paul Shaffer and the CBS Orchestra". The name "CBS Orchestra", approved by CBS (who retained rights to the name after Letterman retired in 2015), was Shaffer's idea. Notably, however, "Stupid Pet Tricks" originated on Letterman's 1980 early morning show The David Letterman Show, to which Letterman, not NBC, owned the rights. This meant "Stupid Pet Tricks" was able to cross over to the CBS show with its name and concept unchanged. With Carson retired, Letterman was also granted free use of some of Carson's sketches, and in due time, "Stump the Band" and "Carnac the Magnificent" (with Shaffer as Carnac) entered the Late Show rotation.

=== Licensing rights after the show's end ===
==== Cable TV syndication ====
In November 1993, E! Entertainment Television purchased syndication rights to Late Night with David Letterman. The network broadcast repeats of complete shows from various years five days per week from 1993 until 1996. Then, Trio: Popular Arts Television (owned by NBC/Vivendi Universal Entertainment) picked up reruns and showed them from 2002 until the channel went off the air in 2005.

A number of programs were sold by GoodTimes Entertainment in 1992–93. These episodes were stripped of the series theme, open and close. No DVD release is currently scheduled (GoodTimes went bankrupt in 2005; the company's assets are now owned by Gaiam, which does not typically distribute general-interest programming).

==== YouTube ====
In February 2022, through a licensing agreement between NBC and Worldwide Pants and coinciding with the 40th anniversary of Late Night's premiere, Letterman's official YouTube channel—active since 2013 towards the end of his Late Show run on CBS—started posting clips of Letterman's Late Night as well as his previous morning and subsequent Late Show programs.

==== Streaming ====
From September 2025, Letterman TV—a channel launched in December 2024 on the free ad-supported streaming service Samsung TV Plus—began showing content from Late Night with David Letterman. The inclusion followed a transaction between NBCUniversal Global TV Distribution and Samsung TV Plus that saw the latter secure the licensing rights to Late Night's entire 1,810-episode run.

== Format ==
Like most other late-night talk shows, the show featured at least two or three guests each night, usually including a comedian or musical guest.

Letterman frequently used crew members in his comedy bits, so viewers got to know the writers and crew members of the show. Common contributors included bandleader Paul Shaffer, Chris Elliott, Calvert DeForest as "Larry 'Bud' Melman," announcer Bill Wendell, writer Adam Resnick, scenic designer Kathleen Ankers, stage manager Biff Henderson, producer Robert Morton, director Hal Gurnee, associate director Peter Fatovich, stage hand Al Maher, camera operator Baily Stortz, production manager Elmer Gorry as NBC President Grant Tinker, and the "production twins," Barbara Gaines and Jude Brennan. The cramped quarters of 30 Rockefeller Plaza also often played into the humor of the show.

Letterman's show established a reputation for being unpredictable. A number of celebrities had even stated that they were afraid of appearing on the show. This reputation was born out of moments like Letterman's verbal sparring matches with Cher, Shirley MacLaine and Harvey Pekar.

The show had its frequent favorite guests including Pee-wee Herman, Steve Martin, Charles Grodin, George Carlin and Jay Leno. Ruth Westheimer, Teri Garr and Sandra Bernhard were also frequently booked, with Garr appearing 32 times, Bernhard appearing 28 times and Westheimer, 15 times.

Because of the creativity of staff writers like Merrill Markoe, Letterman's NBC show, in its first few years especially, had innovative segments and theme shows that were new and different from other talk shows of the time. Some were visual gags that owed a debt to pioneers like Ernie Kovacs and Steve Allen. Among the highlights were:

- There were segments where Letterman was dressed in a suit of Velcro and stuck (thrown) to a Velcro wall, a suit of chips and dunked into a vat of chip dip, a suit of Rice Krispies and doused with gallons of milk while lying in a huge bowl, a suit of Alka-Seltzer tablets and dunked in water, a suit of suet and placed in a cage with farm animals, etc.
- Visual segments showing things being crushed by a hydraulic press, thrown through fluorescent lights or dropped off an office building to smash on the ground, were also common.
- Letterman's desk featured a control panel where he could operate a bubble machine, a confetti cannon, "radioactive" steam, a belch of New York soot or strange lighting.
- When he threw his pencils or notecards through the fake window scene behind him, a sound effect of breaking glass was always heard. Occasionally, if sound effects technician Howard Vinitisky was slow in triggering the appropriate breaking glass sound effect, Letterman would mockingly chide Vinitisky for the error (he would also occasionally congratulate Vinitisky when the sound effect was especially well-timed).
- A robotic arm for a while delivered the Top Ten List, and for another week or so, a complicated series of tubes would produce swirling coffee to eventually land in his cup on the desk.
- Cameras mounted on a chimpanzee's back (Late Night Monkey Cam) or on the roof (Roof Cam) would show odd viewpoints of the set and its participants.

Other show format innovations related to the way individual episodes or segments were presented:

- One early episode showed everything from Dave's eye view with Markoe and others coming at Dave to pitch ideas as he walked onto the stage, and the audience was shown from Dave's view during the monologue and the opening segments.
- In another show, (the 360° show) the on-screen picture made one complete 360-degree rotation over the course of the hour, meaning that halfway through the episode, the entire image seen was upside-down.
- The Custom Made Shows allowed the audience to vote on each part of the hour, giving them a wide range of choices in what they could see. The resulting shows had guests talking in high-pitched voices after they had inhaled helium (Jane Pauley refused to say a word during this, and answered his questions by writing answers on cards and showing them), and sitting in dentist chairs or lawn furniture. As well. the theme music could be replaced by the theme from Gilligan's Island, and the opening montage replaced by a selection of the director's vacation photos.
- Occasional one-shot episodes were done in a completely different programming style, with new graphics, music and features. These included Late Night's ostensible summer replacement variety show "Dave Letterman's Sunshine Summertime Smile Hour", and a special "Morning Show" done in the style of The Today Show with a perky, vacuous female co-host.
- Reruns were often scoffed at by Letterman, telling the audience not to waste their time watching next Monday. On at least one occasion, the entire rerun was dubbed into a foreign language for rebroadcast, baffling and angering viewers, some even to the extent of calling the station to complain. On another occasion, Letterman (appearing in a box in the upper corner of the screen) gave a sarcastic running commentary on the repeat episode, pointing out mistakes and bits that didn't work.
- Letterman once had a member of the audience host the show and interview guests while he left the studio (ostensibly to search for a missing tooth).
- Letterman hosted the show from his home while waiting for his cable TV to be installed; another episode was done from the production offices upstairs, as the cast claimed they were "too tired" to go downstairs to the studio.
- Letterman once taped an episode with 13 cameras, some with a wide shot, one with a feed in black and white, and one pointed up at his crotch.
- Crispin Glover and Oliver Reed frightened Dave with their nearly violent, confrontational behavior in their appearances.

== Awards ==
=== Primetime Emmy Awards ===
- 1982–83 Outstanding Writing in a Variety, Comedy or Music Program
- 1983–84 Outstanding Writing in a Variety, Comedy or Music Program
- 1984–85 Outstanding Writing in a Variety, Comedy or Music Program
- 1985–86 Outstanding Writing in a Variety, Comedy or Music Program
- 1989–90 Outstanding Directing in a Variety, Comedy or Music Program

The show was nominated as Outstanding Variety, Music or Comedy Series for 10 consecutive seasons, from its second full season in 1983–84 through its final season in 1992–93. Including the nominations for the CBS Late Show variant, the Letterman team was nominated 26 consecutive times in this category.

=== Peabody ===
In 1991, the show's three production companies—Carson Productions, Worldwide Pants, and NBC Productions—were awarded a Peabody Award, which cited the following:

Once a television wasteland, late night has become a daypart of increased interest to programmers, performers, and viewers. In the past ten years, one show has moved to the position of the leader in late night television in creativity, humor, and innovation. That program is Late Night With David Letterman. As one member of the Peabody Board remarked, "David Letterman is a born broadcaster." He is also a savvy co-executive producer. Along with co-executive producer Jack Rollins, producer Robert Morton, director Hal Gurnee, and musical director Paul Shaffer, Mr. Letterman has surrounded himself with exceptional talent and given them the go-ahead to experiment with the television medium. Particularly noteworthy is the work of head writer Steve O'Donnell and his talented staff. Together, the "Late Night" team manages to take one of TV's most conventional and least inventive forms—the talk show—and infuse it with freshness and imagination. For television programming which, at its best, is evocative of the greats, from Your Show of Shows, to The Steve Allen Show, and The Ernie Kovacs Show, a Peabody to Late Night with David Letterman.

== See also ==
- List of late-night American network TV programs

Media offices
Preceded by none	Late Night era by host 1 February 1982 – 25 June 1993	Succeeded by Late Night with Conan O'Brien
Preceded by The David Letterman Show	David Letterman talk show 1 February 1982 – 25 June 1993	Succeeded by Late Show with David Letterman
