= Munchie Strikes Back =

- DVD cover
- Directed by: Jim Wynorski
- Written by: Jim Wynorski; R. J. Robertson
- Produced by: Mike Elliott
- Starring: Lesley-Anne Down; Andrew Stevens; Trenton Knight; Angus Scrimm; John Byner; Steve Franken; Natanya Ross; Howard Hesseman
- Cinematography: Don E. FauntLeRoy
- Edited by: Brian Katkin
- Music by: Chuck Cirino
- Production company: Roger Corman Production
- Distributed by: Concorde Pictures
- Release date: June 29, 1994
- Running time: 94 minutes
- Country: United States
- Language: English

Munchie Strikes Back is a 1994 American comedy feature film directed by Jim Wynorski and written by Wynorski and R. J. Robertson, as a sequel to Munchie. While Dom DeLuise provided the voice of Munchie in the first movie, this time it was done by Howard Hesseman.

== Plot ==
Because of the repercussions left from his last adventure, Munchie must appear before a celestial court presided over by Kronus. The tribunal proceeds to blame Munchie for a number of historical calamities, including the sinking of Atlantis, the crash of the Hindenburg, the cataclysm of Vesuvius and the meltdown of Chernobyl. As punishment, he is sentenced to help single mother Linda McClelland. Linda's son, Chris, is the only one who can see Munchie and Munchie and he become best friends. Chris is the pitcher of a Little League team and is being bullied by Bret Carlisle, who is his rival in baseball as well as for the attentions of the girl next door, Jennifer. While out of town on a business trip, Linda's boss makes improper advances to her. When she refuses his advances, he fires her. This creates financial hardship on the family. Munchie intervenes in their lives, making it so Chris has a perfect game and impresses Jennifer, and Linda finds a bag of money to prevent eviction. Munchie appears back before the tribunal, who assign his next punishment... to help Bill Clinton.

== Cast ==
- Howard Hesseman as Munchie (voice)
- Lesley-Anne Down as Linda McClelland, Chris's single mother
- Andrew Stevens as Shelby Carlisle, Elliot's identical twin brother
- Trenton Knight as Chris McClelland
- Angus Scrimm as Kronas
- John Byner as Coach Elkins, Chris's coach
- Steve Franken as Professor Graves
- Natanya Ross as Jennifer
- Ace Mask as Mr. Poyndexter, Chris's teacher
- Cory Mendelsohn as Bret Carlisle, Shelby's son
- Erik Seidenglanz as Shelby Carlisle Jr., Shelby's son
- Jamie McEnnan as Gage Dobson
- Toni Naples as Newscaster
- Antonia Dorian as Cleopatra
- Andy Wood as Sherman

== Reception ==
Reviewers generally found the movie a poor sequel to Munchie. TV Guide offered that Munchie Strikes Back "turns an annoying, no-budget children's movie into an annoying, no-budget children's series," and in considering the film's attempts at humour, wrote the film "is the sort of ill-considered comedy in which a Little League team can be named the 'Hillside Stranglers', and big laughs are expected from the sight of a woman kicking a dog." X-Entertainment was only slightly less harsh, with its review saying, "The series saw its last hurrah in the movie we're reviewing today, 1992's Munchie Strikes Back. Assuming that at least some of you have seen Munchies, throw away everything you think you know about the lore. The last two films were entirely different and strictly for kids. It's for this reason that I'm having trouble calling this pile of shit a pile of shit — putting myself in the mindset of a seven-year-old, it's not too terrible. Can't really recommend it as fodder for your bad movie nights (stick with the original for those), but if you've ever wanted 80 minutes' worth of Howard Heeseman voicing the poor man's ALF, Munchie Strikes Back caters to your unique and pitiful whim." John Stanley gave the film one-and-a-half stars, denouncing it as a watered "down kiddie fantasy from the Roger Corman factory..."
