= The Two Roads Theater =

Black box theatre in California

Coordinates: 34.1491°N 118.3788°W

The Two Roads Theater is a 60-seat black box theatre, with an elevated stage, located in Studio City, California, United States at 4348 Tujunga Ave in the Little Tujunga Village neighborhood.

== History ==
Originally built in 1986, and housed in a building constructed in 1946, the intimate theater was remodeled and refurbished in 2003 shortly after it was purchased by Rick and Shari Shaw from Edmund Gaynes, who operated the St Luke's Theater in New York City. The Two Roads Theater is a member of the NoHo Arts District, in North Hollywood, the Valley Theater League and the Tujunga Village Merchants’ Association.

The Two Roads is home to original stage comedies and musicals, live comedy, improv and music shows, film screenings, seminars, acting classes, workshops and the Valley Film Festival. Located within the Two Roads Theater is the Two Roads Gallery - a hybrid gallery of contemporary art.

In June 2011, The Two Roads presented the world premiere of Kowalski, a new play by Gregg Ostrin.
