= Johnny Galecki =

American actor (born 1975)

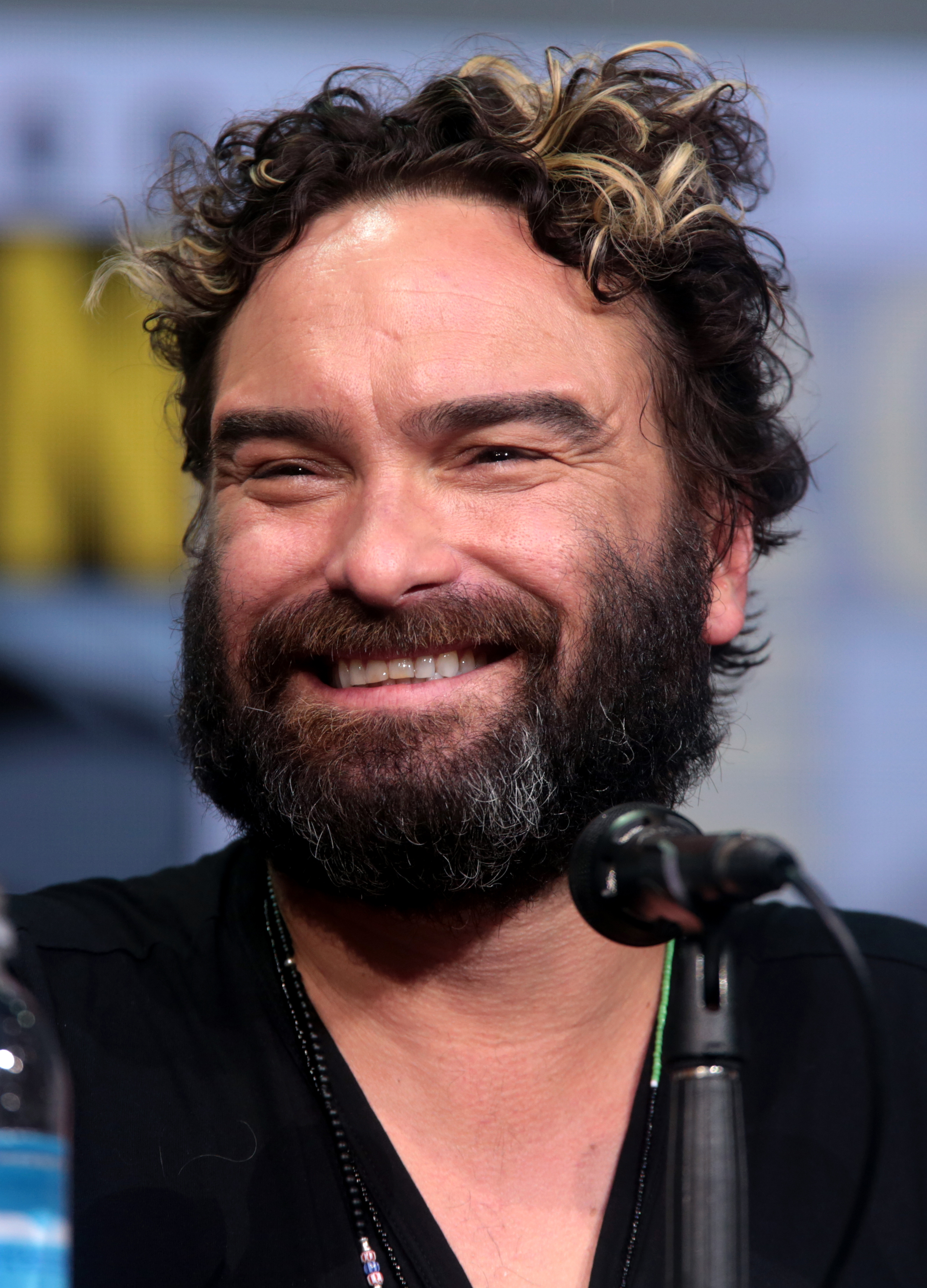
- Galecki at the San Diego Comic-Con in 2017
- Born: John Mark Galecki; April 30, 1975 (age 51); Bree, Limburg, Belgium
- Occupation: Actor
- Years active: 1987–present
- Spouse: Morgan Galecki (m. 2024)
- Partners: Alaina Meyer (2018–2020)
- Children: 2

John Mark Galecki (born April 30, 1975) is an American actor. He played Leonard Hofstadter on The Big Bang Theory (2007–2019) and David Healy in Roseanne (1992–1997; 2018) and The Conners (2018–2019). Galecki also appeared in the films Prancer (1989), National Lampoon's Christmas Vacation (1989), Suicide Kings (1997), I Know What You Did Last Summer (1997), Bookies (2003), In Time (2011), and Rings (2017).

Galecki was one of the highest paid television actors in the world, with his role in The Big Bang Theory earning him approximately US$900,000 per episode between 2017 and 2019. In 2018, he was estimated to be the world's second highest-paid male TV actor by Forbes—behind only his The Big Bang Theory co-star Jim Parsons—earning $25 million. The accolades he has received include a Satellite Award, alongside nominations for a Primetime Emmy Award, Golden Globe Award, and six Screen Actors Guild Awards.

== Early life ==
Galecki was born in Bree, Limburg, Belgium, to American parents of Polish, Irish, and Italian descent. His mother, Mary Louise "Mary Lou" Noon, was a mortgage consultant, and his father, Richard Galecki, was a member of the U.S. Air Force stationed in Belgium and worked as a rehabilitation teacher. Galecki is the eldest of three children with a sister, Allison, and a brother, Nick, who he describes as a "mechanical genius" in the automotive industry. Galecki grew up in Oak Park, Illinois. He dropped out of school after 8th grade, attending high school for only one day.

During an interview with New Zealand radio station ZM, Galecki recalled his childhood relationship with his mother. As a child, he was well known for making up long stories and tales. In such situations, his mother used to make him play the "quiet game", where he had to see how long he could go without talking. He also recalled that despite being a loving mother, she was also very tough. One phrase she would lovingly use was, "I love you, now get out."

== Career ==
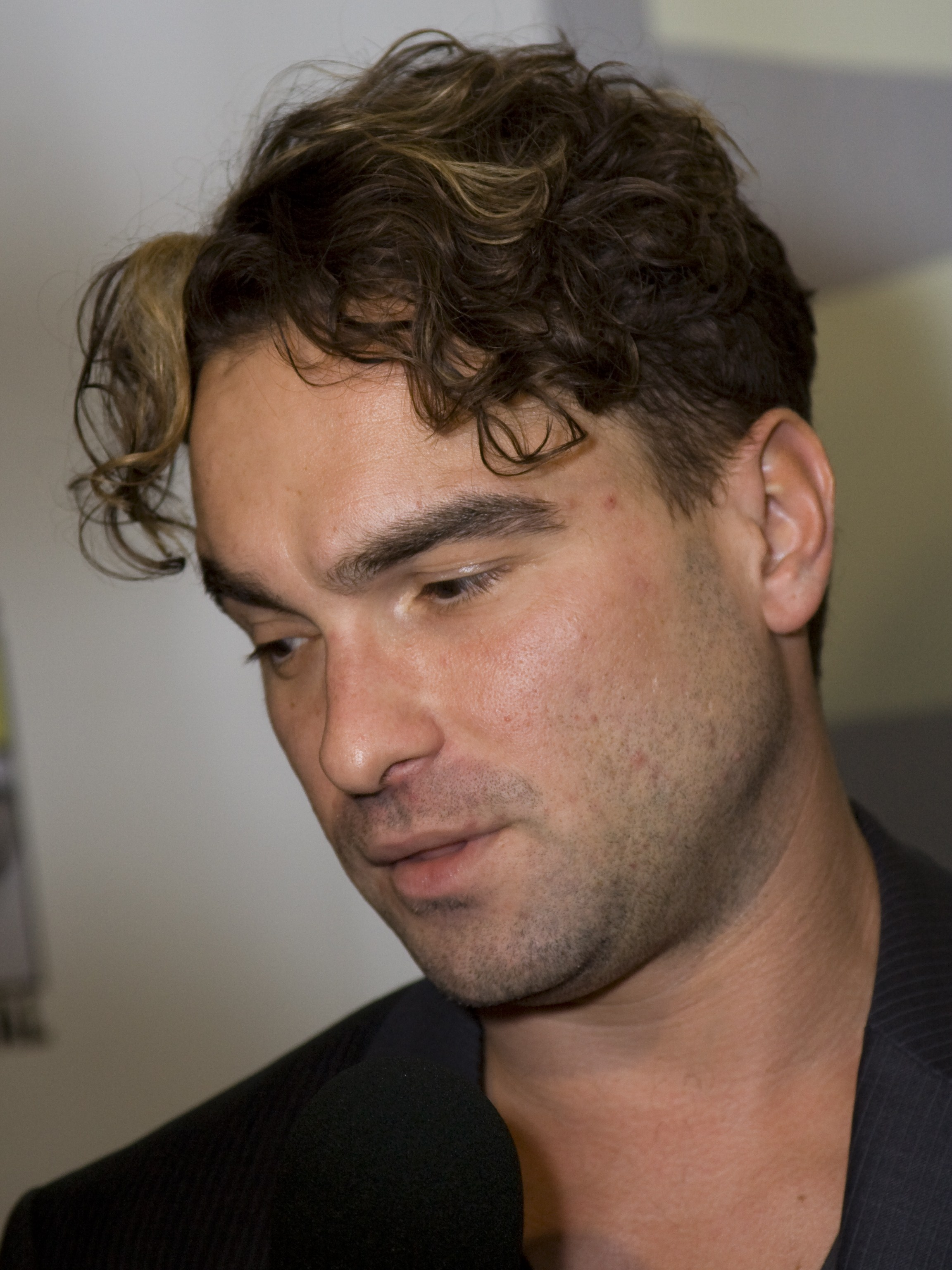
Galecki in July 2008

After working in the Chicago theatre scene as a young child, Galecki made his onscreen acting debut in the 1987 CBS miniseries Murder Ordained with JoBeth Williams and future Roseanne co-star John Goodman. In 1989, Galecki portrayed Rusty Griswold in National Lampoon's Christmas Vacation. In 1990, he was cast as Danny Nash, the son of Robert Urich's lead character, on the NBC comedy American Dreamer; the following season, he was a regular cast member on the ABC sitcom Billy, a spin-off from Head of the Class. He appeared in one episode of Blossom in 1991, opposite his future The Big Bang Theory co-star Mayim Bialik. He played a young delinquent in A Family Torn Apart, a 1993 TV movie based on a true story about a serial killer.

During his run on Billy, Galecki began making guest appearances on the hit ABC sitcom Roseanne as the younger brother of Mark Healy (Glenn Quinn), who began a relationship with Darlene Conner (Sara Gilbert). Introduced in his first appearance as Kevin Healy, his name was soon changed to David. After a few more guest shots, Galecki was named a permanent Roseanne cast member from the fall of 1992 onward, after the cancellation of Billy. He would remain in the role of David Healy until the end of Roseanne's run in 1997, with the character eventually marrying Darlene and fathering two children with her. Galecki's character on The Big Bang Theory would also have a short-lived relationship with Gilbert's character on the same show.

Galecki also appeared in the 1995 music video for the Dave Matthews Band song "Satellite".

After Roseanne ended, Galecki had small roles in a string of films, including the 1997 summer slasher film I Know What You Did Last Summer, Bean (1997), The Opposite of Sex (1998), Bounce (2000) and Vanilla Sky (2001). He had larger roles in the 1997 film Suicide Kings and the 2003 film Bookies, a comedy thriller film about four college students. Galecki appeared as a golfer in a 2005 episode of My Name Is Earl entitled "Stole Beer from a Golfer".

In 2005, Galecki played Mark Corrigan in a pilot for a US adaptation of the British sitcom Peep Show. He played a character named Trouty on TBS's sitcom My Boys, and the half-brother of the main characters, sisters Hope Shanowski and Faith Fairfield, in the sitcom Hope & Faith. Galecki originated the role of Alex, a male prostitute, in the play The Little Dog Laughed by Douglas Carter Beane, in 2006 at Second Stage Theater. He stayed in the role for the play's Broadway run at the Cort Theatre in late 2006 and early 2007. Galecki said at the time, "At its core, the play is about what we all sacrifice to be successful, whatever our careers or goals." The play was a critical success, and Galecki won a 2007 Theater World Award for his performance.

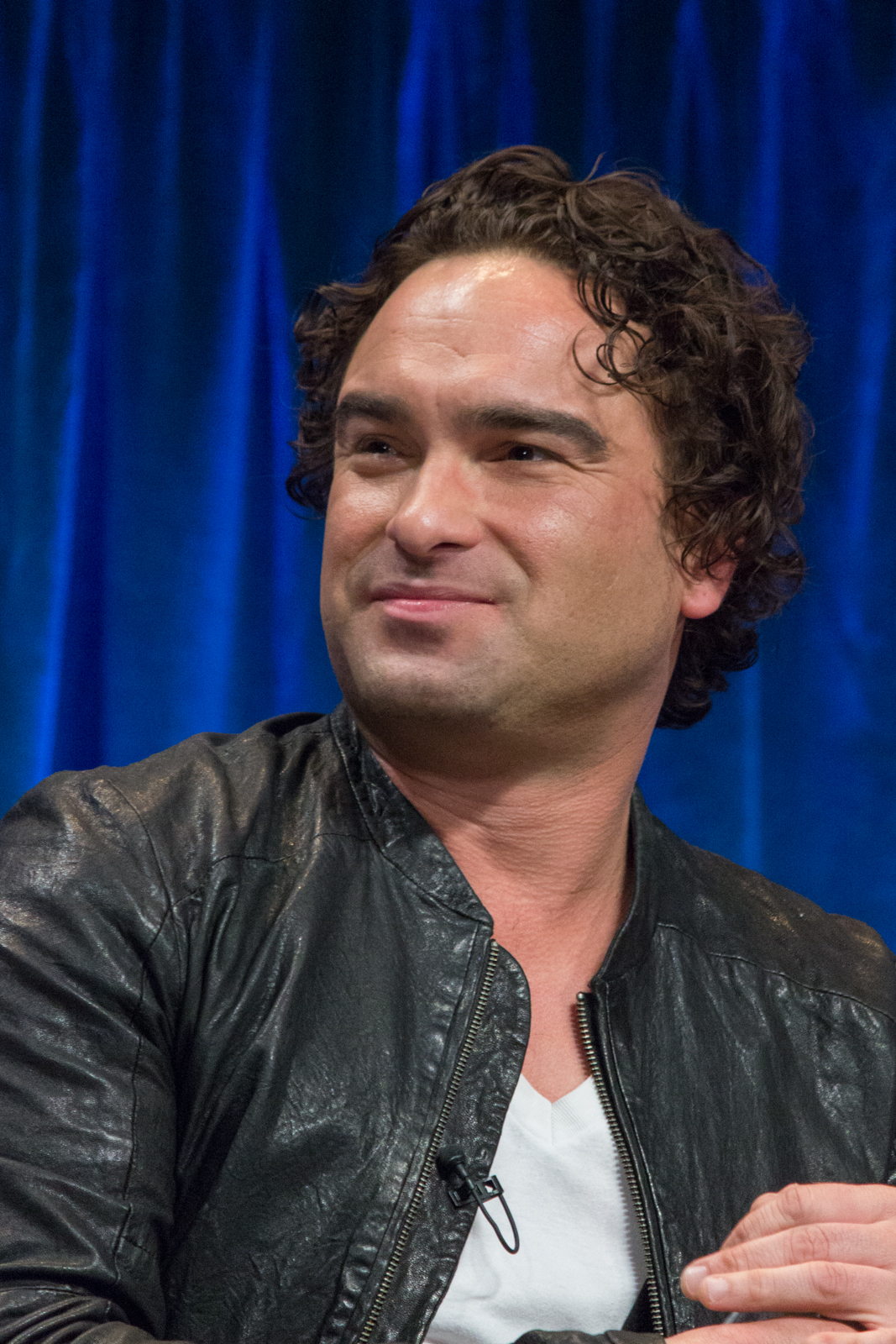
Galecki at PaleyFest 2013

Galecki played Leonard Hofstadter in the CBS sitcom The Big Bang Theory, which ran from 2007 to 2019 and was, for most of its run, among the top three most popular television comedies in the US. Galecki was originally asked to play the role of Sheldon Cooper, but he felt he was better suited for the role of Leonard, and Sheldon's role was eventually given to Jim Parsons. During the show's run, two of Galecki's former Roseanne co-stars appeared on the show: Sara Gilbert (as Leslie Winkle, Leonard's colleague) and Laurie Metcalf (as Mary Cooper, Sheldon's mother). Galecki is a cellist, a talent that was used on the show. Until 2013, Galecki and his Big Bang co-stars Kaley Cuoco and Jim Parsons each earned US$325,000 per episode. By 2014, the three were earning US$1 million per episode.

Galecki appeared briefly in the 2008 superhero comedy Hancock, alongside Will Smith and Jason Bateman. In July 2011, he played a parody version of himself in three episodes of Entourage. He also appeared in the film In Time (2011) with Justin Timberlake and Amanda Seyfried.

Galecki appeared in one episode of the 2018 revival of Roseanne on ABC, which premiered in March. It was canceled that May after Roseanne Barr posted a controversial and racist tweet about Valerie Jarrett. Roseanne was replaced by a new program, The Conners, which premiered in October 2018 and featured the same cast without Barr. Galecki occasionally appeared as David on The Conners.

In July 2026, after a seven-year hiatus from acting, Galecki announced his return to the stage at Michigan Avenue in Chicago, Illinois, with the Lookingglass Theatre Company. Galecki played the role of Tennessee Williams in the play Kowalski, written by Gregg Ostrin and directed by Colin Hanlon, from September through October 2026.

== Personal life ==
As a teenager, Galecki dated his Roseanne (and later The Big Bang Theory) co-star Sara Gilbert (their characters also dated). During their relationship, Gilbert came out as lesbian. They remain close friends.

While working on The Big Bang Theory, Galecki dated co-star Kaley Cuoco for about two years until December 2009 while the two also played a couple on the show. Cuoco told CBS Watch that they have remained on good terms since ending their relationship.

In late June 2017, Galecki's ranch, a property that is not his primary home, was destroyed in a major wildfire known as the Hill Fire.

In 2018, Galecki started dating Alaina Meyer. Their son was born in November 2019. In November 2020, it was reported that Galecki and Meyer had separated. He is now married to Morgan Galecki, who in 2024 gave birth to their daughter.

== Filmography ==
=== Film ===
Year	Film	Role	Notes
1987	Time Out for Dad	Matt Rowles	
1987	Murder Ordained	Doug Rule	
1988	A Night in the Life of Jimmy Reardon	Toby Reardon	
1989	Prancer	Billy Quinn	
1989	National Lampoon's Christmas Vacation	Russell "Rusty" Griswold	
1989	In Defense of a Married Man	Eric	
1991	Backfield in Motion	Tim Seavers	
1993	A Family Torn Apart	Daniel Hannigan	
1994	Without Consent	Marty	
1996	Murder at My Door	Teddy McNair	
1997	Bean	Stingo Wheelie	
1997	Suicide Kings	Ira Reder	
1997	I Know What You Did Last Summer	Max Neurick	
1998	The Opposite of Sex	Jason Bock	
2000	Playing Mona Lisa	Arthur	
2000	Bounce	Seth	
2001	Morgan's Ferry	Darcy	
2001	Vanilla Sky	Peter Brown	
2003	Bookies	Jude Petra	
2004	Chrystal	Barry	
2004	White Like Me	Marcus	Short film
2005	Happy Endings	Miles	Uncredited cameo
2007	Who You Know	David	Short film
2008	Hancock	Jeremy	
2009	Table for Three	Ted	
2011	In Time	Borel	
2013	CBGB	Terry Ork	
2016	The Cleanse	Paul	Also producer
2017	Rings	Gabriel Brown	
2019	A Dog's Journey	Henry Montgomery	

=== Television ===
Year	Title	Role	Notes
1990–1991	American Dreamer	Danny Nash	Main role
1990	Blind Faith	John Marshall	Main role, miniseries
1991	Blossom	Jason	Episode: "Sex, Lies and Teenagers"
1992	Billy	David MacGregor	Main role
1992–1997; 2018	Roseanne	David Healy / Kevin Healy (1st episode)	Recurring role (season 4–9), guest (season 10)
1993	Civil Wars	Greg Stolbach	Episode: "Split Ends"
2000	Batman Beyond	Knux (voice)	Episode: "April Moon"
2000	The Norm Show	Dale Stockhouse	Episode: "Norm vs. Youth"
2004	LAX	Leland Pressman	Episode: "Finnegan Again, Begin Again"
2005	My Name Is Earl	Scott	Episode: "Stole Beer from a Golfer"
2005	Hope & Faith	Jay	3 episodes
2005	Peep Show	Mark	Unaired pilot
2006	American Dad!	Arnie (voice)	Episode: "Irregarding Steve"
2006–2007	My Boys	Trouty	3 episodes
2007–2019	The Big Bang Theory	Leonard Hofstadter	Main cast
2009	Family Guy	Leonard Hofstadter (voice)	Episode: "Business Guy"
2011	Entourage	Himself	3 episodes
2016	Lip Sync Battle	Himself	Episode: "Josh Gad vs. Kaley Cuoco"
2018–2019	The Conners	David Healy	Recurring role (season 1–2); 4 episodes; Uncredited

=== Music videos ===
Year	Artist	Song
1995	Dave Matthews Band	"Satellite"
2017	Badflower	"Heroin"

== Theatre ==
Years	Title	Role	Location / company
1985	The Member of the Wedding	John Henry	Stage Left Theatre, Chicago.
1986	Galileo	The Young Boy	Goodman Theatre, Chicago.
1998	Pot Mom	Troy	Steppenwolf Theatre Company, Chicago.
2001	The Drawer Boy	Miles	Steppenwolf Theatre Company, Chicago.
2006	The Little Dog Laughed	Alex	James Earl Jones Theater, Broadway
2026	Kowalski	Tennessee Williams	Lookingglass Theatre Company, Chicago

== Awards and nominations ==
Award	Year	Category	Work	Result
Critics' Choice Television Awards	2015	Best Actor in a Comedy Series	The Big Bang Theory	Nominated
Golden Globe Awards	2012	Best Performance by an Actor in a Television Series – Comedy or Musical	The Big Bang Theory	Nominated
Golden Nymph Awards	2012	Outstanding Actor in a Comedy Series	The Big Bang Theory	Nominated
Primetime Emmy Awards	2011	Outstanding Lead Actor in a Comedy Series	The Big Bang Theory	Nominated
Satellite Awards	2012	Best Actor in a Series, Comedy or Musical	The Big Bang Theory	Won
Screen Actors Guild Awards	2012	Outstanding Performance by an Ensemble in a Comedy Series (shared with the cast)	The Big Bang Theory	Nominated
Screen Actors Guild Awards	2013	Outstanding Performance by an Ensemble in a Comedy Series (shared with the cast)	The Big Bang Theory	Nominated
Screen Actors Guild Awards	2014	Outstanding Performance by an Ensemble in a Comedy Series (shared with the cast)	The Big Bang Theory	Nominated
Screen Actors Guild Awards	2015	Outstanding Performance by an Ensemble in a Comedy Series (shared with the cast)	The Big Bang Theory	Nominated
Screen Actors Guild Awards	2016	Outstanding Performance by an Ensemble in a Comedy Series (shared with the cast)	The Big Bang Theory	Nominated
Screen Actors Guild Awards	2017	Outstanding Performance by an Ensemble in a Comedy Series (shared with the cast)	The Big Bang Theory	Nominated
People's Choice Awards	2014	Favorite TV Bromance (Shared with Jim Parsons, Kunal Nayyar, and Simon Helberg)	The Big Bang Theory	Nominated
People's Choice Awards	2016	Favorite Comedic TV Actor	The Big Bang Theory	Nominated
Teen Choice Awards	2010	Choice TV Male Scene Stealer	The Big Bang Theory	Nominated
Theatre World Award	2007	Performing Award	The Little Dog Laughed	Won
TV Land Awards	2008	Innovator (Shared with Sarah Chalke, Sara Gilbert and Alicia Goranson)	Roseanne	Won
Young Artist Awards	1992	Best Young Actor Starring in a Television Series	American Dreamer	Nominated
Young Artist Awards	1993	Best Young Actor Recurring in a Television Series	Roseanne	Nominated
Young Artist Awards	1994	Best Youth Comedian	Roseanne	Won
Young Artist Awards	1995	Best Performance: Young Actor in a TV Comedy Series	Roseanne	Nominated
Young Artist Awards	1998	Best Performance in a TV Movie or Feature Film – Young Ensemble (shared with the cast)	I Know What You Did Last Summer	Nominated
