= Ted Harbert =

American businessman (born 1955)

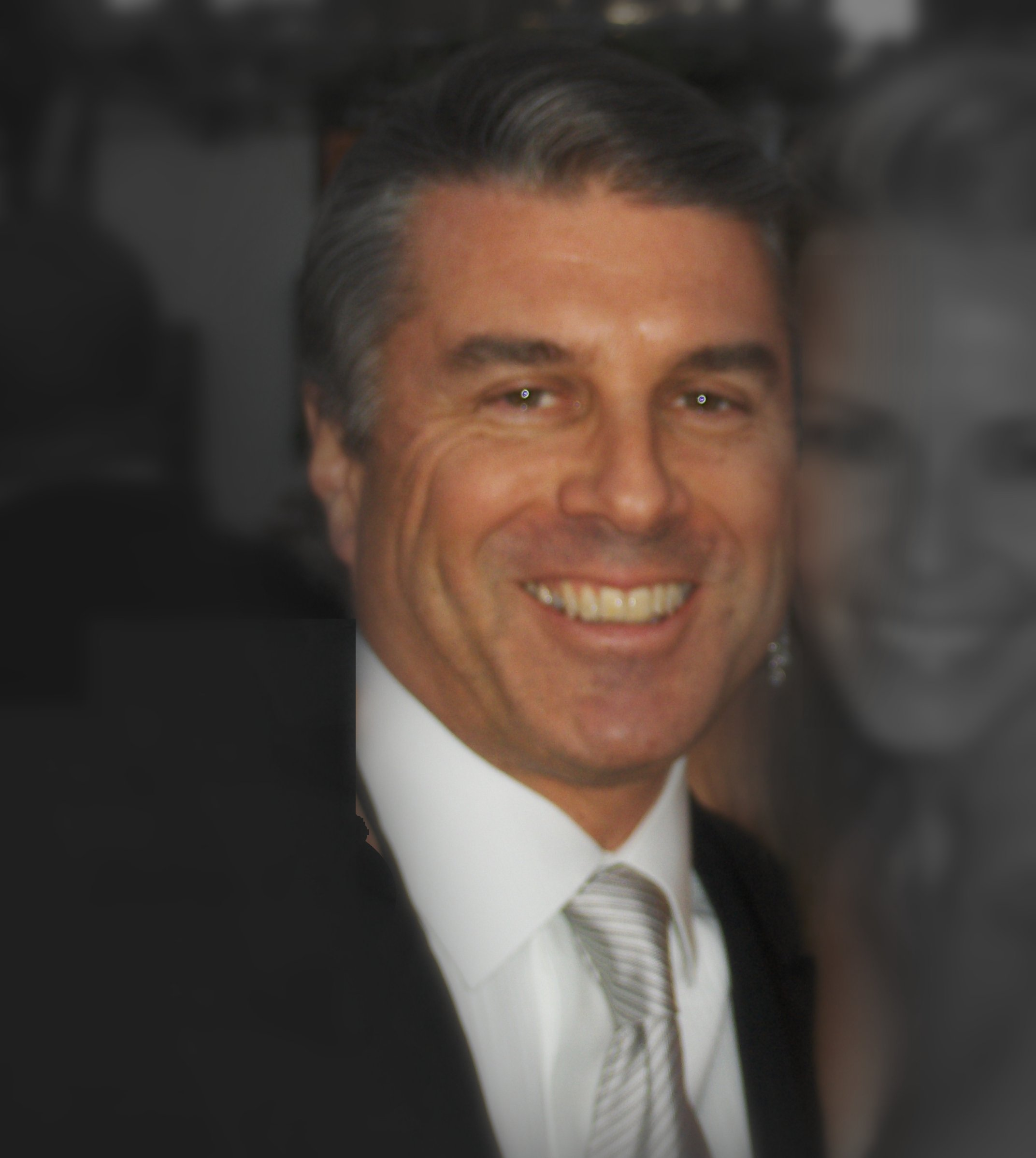
- Harbert and Chelsea Handler at the 2007 Golden Globe Awards afterparty held at the Beverly HIlton Hotel in Los Angeles
- Born: Edward W. Harbert III; June 15, 1955 (age 71); New York City, New York, US
- Education: Boston University
- Occupations: Broadcasting and television executive
- Years active: 1973–present
- Spouses: Susan Sands (m. 1987; div. 2006); Lisa Medrano (m. 2011)
- Partner: Chelsea Handler (2005-2010)
- Children: 2

Edward W. Harbert III (born June 15, 1955) is an American broadcasting and television executive. He was the chairman of NBC, and the president and CEO of the Comcast Entertainment Group, and chairman of ABC Entertainment.

== Early life and career ==
Born in 1955 in New York City, Harbert is the son of Marna and Edward W. Harbert II, a pioneering television, advertising, and publishing executive. One of six children, he grew up immersed in television, and aspired to a career in the industry while still a child. In a 2005 article in Advertising Age, he wrote, “I started poring over the ratings in Nielsen 'Pocket Pieces' when I was 9 years old. Two years later, I learned there were jobs at networks that picked shows and decided where they went on the schedule. From that moment, I wanted one of those jobs.”

Ted Harbert started his broadcasting career as a student at Boston University’s college radio station, WTBU, where he worked with Howard Stern, his friend. After graduating magna cum laude with a degree in broadcasting and film from the Boston University School of Communications, Harbert went back to Manhattan, New York and worked for ABC. He moved to Los Angeles in 1981 and was at ABC for 20 years going from being a feature film coordinator to the president of ABC. At ABC, Harbert was closely associated with well known shows includingThe Wonder Years, NYPD Blue, The Practice, and My So-Called Life among others and while he was at ABC the network led in primetime in 1995 for the first time in 17 years. ABC topped all of the networks in profits for several years.

In 1999, after a two-year post as a producer for DreamWorks TV, Harbert was appointed president of NBC Studios, in charge of primetime, daytime, and late night programs. In 2004, Harbert became the president of E! Networks. In 2006, he was promoted to the newly created position of president and CEO at the Comcast Entertainment Group running E!, Style Network, G4, Comcast International Media Group, and Comcast Entertainment Productions. When Harbert extended his Comcast contract in 2010, it was noted that E!, in particular, had been successful and for six years had record ratings.

Harbert was appointed to his most recent position in 2011 after Comcast's acquisition of NBC Universal. He was responsible for NBC advertising sales, the NBC owned television stations, affiliate relations, network research, domestic television distribution, in addition to NBCUniversal digital entertainment and special events. In 2013, it was announced that Harbert would oversee NBC late night programming. During Harbert's tenure, The Tonight Show returned to its birthplace of New York City, a move coinciding with the transition of hosts from Jay Leno to Jimmy Fallon, while Seth Meyers took former Saturday Night Live castmate Fallon's slot on Late Night. Harbert left NBCUniversal in 2016.

== In pop culture ==
Harbert, who appeared as himself in an episode of Curb Your Enthusiasm (Season 1, Episode 9), is frequently referenced on the Howard Stern Show. He has been called a "boldface name," due in part to a four-year relationship with comedian Chelsea Handler.

== Personal life ==
Harbert and Chelsea Handler were linked romantically starting in 2005. They broke up in 2010 according to Handler because the two couldn't separate business. Harbert and Lisa Medrano, a former human resources executive married on June 11, 2011. Harbert has two children, Emily and Will, from a previous marriage.

He serves on the boards of Urban Arts Partnership, the Friends of the Saban Free Clinic, City Year LA, Paley Center for Media, Hollywood Radio and Television Society, and the executive committee of Boston University's School of Communication.
