= List of According to Jim episodes =

The following is an episode list for the American sitcom television series According to Jim, which ran on ABC from October 3, 2001, to June 2, 2009 for a total of 182 episodes and eight seasons.

In season 5, episode 20, 'The Thin Green Line', Jim's reflection in the men's room mirror calls him "Jim's Boyle", thus, revealing his last name. Just once in the series.

== Series overview ==
Season	Episodes	Originally released	
Season	Episodes	First released	Last released
1	22	October 3, 2001	May 15, 2002
2	28	October 1, 2002	May 20, 2003
3	29	September 23, 2003	May 25, 2004
4	27	September 21, 2004	May 27, 2005
5	22	September 20, 2005	May 2, 2006
6	18	January 3, 2007	May 16, 2007
7	18	January 1, 2008	May 27, 2008
8	18	December 2, 2008	June 2, 2009

== Episodes ==
=== Season 1 (2001–02) ===
No. overall	No. in season	Title	Directed by	Written by	Original release date	Prod. code	Viewers (millions)
1	1	"Pilot"	Andy Cadiff	Tracy Newman & Jonathan Stark	October 3, 2001	536-K	12.72
Jim and Cheryl are the perfect middle class American couple. Happily married, living in a suburban house with two adorable (but loud) little girls and a baby boy, they really can't complain much about life – except for those couple fights that neither one can ever let go, like the time Jim shut the car door on Cheryl. This time the problem is their daughter, whom his wife can't leave alone on her first week at kindergarten. Jim says it's because she's a woman and decides to take Ruby himself, but he also can't leave her behind. Things heat up when Cheryl discovers that not only has he been hiding it from her, but he also changed Ruby's school without talking to her. Meanwhile, Jim and Cheryl try to help Andy make up with his girlfriend, Carrie.
2	2	"No Nookie"	Andy Cadiff	Jeffrey B. Hodes & Nastaran Dibai	October 10, 2001	D-112	9.81
Jim and Cheryl find their romantic getaway to the Bahamas set to work out perfectly, with Dana agreeing (after much convincing) to babysit the kids. However, at the last minute, Dana is not able to babysit, forcing the couple to stay at home. In the meantime, Andy becomes a little too obsessed with making the perfect treehouse for Gracie and Ruby, injuring himself in the process.
3	3	"The Cat Came Back"	Andy Cadiff	Tracy Gamble	October 17, 2001	D-111	11.86
Cheryl's 15-year-old cat Mr. Feeney dies and she wants Jim to bury it in the backyard, but Jim desperately wants to go to the Chicago Bears game. He sticks the cat in the garage freezer, planning on burying it after the game, but Cheryl finds it before he comes home. She is hurt that Jim doesn't listen to her or care about a cat that has been with her longer than anything in her current life. Jim, feeling guilty, provides a proper funeral for Mr. Feeney and gets her a brand new dog, which she doesn't like very much at first, but starts to accept later.
4	4	"Anniversary"	Gil Junger	David Feeney & Todd J. Greenwald	October 24, 2001	D-116	12.84
On Jim and Cheryl's 10th Anniversary, Jim pays Dana to buy him an anniversary gift to give to Cheryl. However, Dana buys a beautiful and touching charm bracelet, going over the spending limit in the process, just to annoy Jim. Cheryl ends up finding out that all her anniversary gifts over the past ten years were bought by Dana, so Jim buys a large TV as his own gift to her. Cheryl is annoyed by this at first, but becomes obsessed with the TV and is forced to admit to Jim that she loves it.
5	5	"Unruly Spirits"	Andy Cadiff	David Regal	October 31, 2001	D-117	9.28
It's Halloween, and Cheryl has forbidden and punished Gracie to go trick-or-treating, since she was misbehaving to go trick-or-treating. However, not wanting his daughter to miss out on the fun of the Halloween spirit, Jim sneaks her out anyway and they head together, but Cheryl finds out about the situation. Meanwhile, Andy becomes convinced that he's being stalked by Carrie, his ex.
6	6	"Cheryl's Old Flame"	Michael Lembeck	Bonnie Kallman	November 7, 2001	D-115	9.70
Jim and Cheryl find themselves wondering if they've set too many rules for their household when they find themselves arguing over whether to allow a TV in the girls' room, making Jim promise Cheryl not to ride his motorcycle. However, Ruby tells Jim that Cheryl has been smoking again.
7	7	"The Crush"	Andy Cadiff	Richard Cohen	November 14, 2001	D-114	10.62
Jim sets Dana up with a guy so perfect that even Cheryl falls for him, causing some situations.
8	8	"The Turkey Bowl"	Gil Junger	Tracy Gamble	November 21, 2001	D-119	8.80
It's Thanksgiving and Jim and Andy are going bowling. Cheryl doesn't like the idea very much, so she sends the girls with him. Jim is one strike away from a perfect game, but just as he is about to roll his final shot, the power goes off and he is left with the choice of either waiting for it to return or giving up a chance at perfection. Cheryl surprises him by bringing the Thanksgiving dinner to the alley so Jim's family and friends can witness his perfect game being completed.
9	9	"Andy's Girlfriend"	Andy Cadiff	Tod Himmel	November 28, 2001	D-113	11.78
Andy has a new girlfriend, and Cheryl wants Jim to treat her nicely because not only is she Andy's first girlfriend since Carrie, but also Ruby's piano teacher. During dinner, Alicia tells Jim she's a vegetarian, believes God is a female and is also a Packers fan – a big insult to Jim. Andy and Alicia break up and then get back together, but she keeps turning down invitations to have dinner at Jim and Cheryl's. The reason? She doesn't like being around Cheryl. Jim rubs it on her face until Cheryl confronts Alicia, who reveals it's only because she thinks Cheryl's too perfect.
10	10	"An According to Jiminy Christmas"	Andy Cadiff	Tod Himmel	December 12, 2001	D-121	9.89
Cheryl's mother Maggie (Kathleen Noone) is coming to visit the family for Christmas and wants to stay at their house. Jim and Cheryl, however, would prefer that she stayed at a hotel but don't know how to bring it up without insulting Maggie. After Jim tells Maggie that Cheryl wants her in a hotel, Maggie gives her grandma's pearl necklace to Dana. Cheryl's upset and goes to the airport to ask her mother' forgiveness, where she learns Dana only got the necklace because she doesn't have anyone in her life like Cheryl has Jim. Meanwhile, the girls are convinced that Andy is Santa.
11	11	"Bad Word"	Gil Junger	David Regal	January 16, 2002	D-123	10.34
Cheryl leaves Jim in charge of their kids and some other kids who were there to play with the girls during a Bears game. The next day, one of the kids mom calls Cheryl, saying her daughter came home repeating a swearing she heard from Jim. Cheryl apologizes for him and Jim is insulted that she always automatically takes the other person's side. Cheryl apologizes, but soon Gracie repeats the exact same word. Jim decides to teach her not to repeat it by making her say it nonstop until she can't say it again, and it works. However, 5 days later, at Ruby's ballet presentation, she slips, falls and says the word, unmasking Jim's guilt.
12	12	"Model Behavior"	Gil Junger	Tracy Gamble	January 23, 2002	D-122	10.42
Jim and Cheryl agree to let Ruby model for a print ad only as a one-time thing, but when the photographer calls her a natural model, Jim gets Ruby an agent, much to Cheryl's dismay.
13	13	"The Money"	Gil Junger	David Feeney & Todd J. Greenwald	January 30, 2002	D-124	11.53
Cheryl decides to loan Andy $1,000 for a down payment on a new condo, which was saved from an account for a trip to Italy, but Cheryl needs Jim to confirm this. When Andy asks Jim about this, he reveals that he spent the money.
14	14	"Blow-Up"	Gil Junger	Mike Dieffenbach	February 13, 2002	D-126	9.72
When Cheryl has a revealing photo of herself taken as a Valentine gift to Jim, he proudly shows it to all his friends during their reversal, only to be caught by Cheryl.
15	15	"Racquetball"	Gil Junger	Richard Goodman	February 27, 2002	D-125	9.44
When Cheryl reminds Jim that she beat him at racquetball years ago, he claims he was only letting her win to gain her affections, so Cheryl challenges him to a no-holds-barred rematch, where Cheryl wins, although it is later revealed that she cheated.
16	16	"Under Pressure"	Gil Junger	Jeffrey B. Hodes & Nastaran Dibai	March 6, 2002	D-120	10.68
After Jim is diagnosed with high blood pressure, Cheryl decides to do everything she can to help him. She makes him special food, gives him back rubs, and keeps asking about his day in order to free him from stress. But Jim doesn't know how to share so much and tells her an old financial problem of the firm. Cheryl stays up all night doing math to figure a way out of the problem. Jim says she has a disease for always trying to help people, which Cheryl responds to by quitting taking care of him. In the end, they finally settle their issues when Jim says he loves her and would be a total mess without her.
17	17	"Date Night"	Andy Cadiff	Richard Greenman	March 13, 2002	D-118	9.02
While out for dinner and a movie, Jim loses a parking spot, and later loses Cheryl when he can't let go of it.
18	18	"Birthday Boys"	Gil Junger	David Regal	March 20, 2002	D-128	8.54
It's Kyle and Andy's birthdays, and Andy is feeling a little left out of his own special day. They decide to take him to a restaurant that serves a 4,5 lbs steak, and Jim offers to pay for the check because Cheryl isn't feeling equal to Dana, who's spending a lot of money on their kids. Dana says she doesn't mind paying the check because she makes more money than Jim, which infuriates him. He buys a donkey for the girls so they can know he's the one they should go to if they want stuff (in this case, they wanted a pony, but "they'll never know the difference"), and it isn't until the donkey ruins a painting Dana bought for Kyle's room that they talk it out and settle their issues.
19	19	"The Receipt"	Gil Junger	Tod Himmel	April 24, 2002	D-129	8.45
When the new DVD player breaks, Jim must find the receipt in order to exchange it. He can't find it anywhere and blames Cheryl for losing it. She says he was the one who lost it, and in order to "win" the fight, Jim buys another DVD player and tells Cheryl he exchanged the broken one. Later, Dana shows up with the receipt, in which Cheryl wrote her a recipe, and Cheryl - after realizing it was her fault after all - burns it. They get into a fight but soon decide to drop the point scoring and just be happy again.
20	20	"Old Friends"	Gil Junger	Tracy Newman & Jonathan Stark	May 1, 2002	D-130	9.92
Jim has a run-in with an old friend from his wild and crazy days who is now a cop (Dan Aykroyd). Jim sets out to prove he's not an "old married guy" by staying out all night and partying. Unfortunately, this has bad consequences for both of them.
21	21	"Cheryl's Day Off"	Gil Junger	Bob Nickman	May 8, 2002	D-127	9.08
Jim agrees to take the girls for the day while Cheryl and Dana go to a doctor's appointment. At the park, Jim leaves the girls with another mom and goes to the movies... where he's busted by Cheryl. Things go from bad to worse when he tries to retrieve the kids and can't remember who he left them with.
22	22	"No Surprises"	Philip Charles MacKenzie	Jeffrey B. Hodes & Nastaran Dibai	May 15, 2002	D-131	10.12
Jim plans a surprise party for Cheryl's birthday, but gets angry and cancels it when Dana spills the beans. To make it up to him, Cheryl plans a party for him... but he's too busy bowling to show up. Guest starring Brian Urlacher.

=== Season 2 (2002–03) ===
No. overall	No. in season	Title	Directed by	Written by	Original release date	Prod. code	Viewers (millions)
23	1	"The Importance of Being Jim"	Philip Charles MacKenzie	Bob Nickman	October 1, 2002	D-133	12.21
Jim buys a digital camera from one of Dana's ex-boyfriends, and it comes with stored pictures of the woman he dumped Dana for. Cheryl thinks it will make Dana feel better if she saw how less attractive the new girl is, but Jim simply deletes the pictures because they weren't important enough for him. They start a fight about what's important to each one of them and Cheryl hides his new camera. Jim tries to get back at her, unsuccessfully. When Kyle starts to take his first steps, the camera is nowhere to be found and the moment is lost forever. That's when Cheryl realizes her actions didn't do any good. They make up and agree on paying more attention to what's important to each other.
24	2	"Cars & Chicks"	Mark Cendrowski	Jeffrey B. Hodes & Nastaran Dibai	October 8, 2002	D-136	13.49
Dana needs to buy a new car and Cheryl offers to go with her, but Jim says chicks are no good buying cars by themselves, because they'll get distracted with other less important things like mirrors or cup holders. Offended, Cheryl is determined to prove Jim wrong and actually gets Dana a car for a fair deal, but the car soon breaks down. Jim takes over the situation and goes down the dealership to manly handle the situation and deal with the salesman. The only thing he wasn't counting on was a very seductive female manager (Cindy Crawford), who convinces Jim to trade in his minivan for a brand new sports car. Cheryl and Dana try to undo the deal, but they have no luck either. Jim and Andy return determined to overcome Gretchen's looks, but Mike Ditka's presence ruins it for them.
25	3	"The Baby Monitor"	Philip Charles MacKenzie	Howard J. Morris	October 15, 2002	D-132	12.70
Cheryl wants to be friends with the new couple who just moved into the neighborhood. She has to be fast and do it before they talk to anyone else and get scared of them. After lending Janet the baby monitor, Cheryl schedules dinner with the new couple and has a hard time convincing Jim to go. When they get home back from the dinner, Cheryl is thrilled that it all went very well, and they're surprised when the baby monitor picks up Ted and Janet's conversation from their bedroom. The entire family gets addicted to eavesdropping on the couple, and Jim accidentally slips Ted's nickname for his penis. The new couple is outraged, and it takes Jim to make up a story about a homosexual experience he had in college to even the score and not lose their new friends.
26	4	"The Pizza Boy"	Philip Charles MacKenzie	Eddie Gorodetsky	October 22, 2002	D-134	13.58
Jim's pizza delivery boy moves in with him and Cheryl after the boy's father kicks him out of the house because of his dream of doing stand up comedy shows, but this is, of course, easier said than done.
27	5	"The Closet"	Mark Cendrowski	Story by : Charles Kanganis; Teleplay by : David Feeney	October 29, 2002	D-138	13.40
Jim asks Cheryl not to intrude his space in the bathroom sink and in their closet, claiming she takes up too much space. Cheryl tries to do something about by getting rid of some of her stuff, but Dana tells her it's time for women everywhere to show men they also have a need for space. Therefore, instead of doing what Jim asked her to, Cheryl buys even more clothes to jam up the closet. As a revenge, Jim decides to decorate their room in his own way. That starts a feud between them, until Jim falls down from the attic on their bed, breaking through the ceiling. He tells Cheryl that he needs his own space, and not because her stuff annoys him, but because he has the need to feel safe from the world sometimes. They settle their feud and agree on respecting each other's spaces.
28	6	"Punch and Ruby"	Phillip Charles MacKenzie	Howard J. Morris	November 5, 2002	D-141	12.33
Jim is taking the girls to their first Bears football game, and Cheryl asks him to be a good role model and try his best not to swear in front of them. At the game, Jim picks a fight with a Packers fan who was swearing with a man in a green shirt, mask and a cheese hat, who is called "Cheese-Head", and the entire fight is televised, with Jim getting the nickname of "Packer Smacker". He finds glory with such a nickname, but Cheryl doesn't like it at all. It only hits Jim the effects his actions might have on his children when Ruby hits Gracie in the nose. Jim has to have a talk with Ruby and hear Cheryl says that the next time he finds himself in a situation like on the football game, that he should just think what she would do and do it. But Jim finds redemption when Gracie refuses to eat sundae fudge because she thinks her butt's too big – something Cheryl was saying around the house not too long ago.
29	7	"The Bachelor"	Phillip Charles MacKenzie	John D. Beck & Ron Hart	November 12, 2002	D-135	12.45
Dana gets selected to be on the reality show The Bachelor. At first she's sure her personality alone will be enough to entertain Rick the Bachelor (Doug Savant), but Jim gives her advice on how to behave and what to say to the guy. At first, Dana doesn't take his advice seriously, but after her date goes wrong she tries Jim's recipe and scores a second date. She arranges with Cheryl to bring the bachelor over to their house for dinner, and Cheryl couldn't be more thrilled to be on national television with a remodeled house. Jim is also very proud that Dana only got so far thanks to him, but the situation quickly takes an unexpected turn when Jim accidentally overhears the bachelor saying Dana will be easy to bring to bed and then he'll dump her. Now he goes out of his way to save Dana and ends up scaring the guy away with stories about Dana being a psycho. Later he explains to her his behavior and says she'll meet someone who's good enough for her.
30	8	"Father Disfigure"	Phillip Charles MacKenzie	Harry Hannigan	November 19, 2002	D-139	12.69
Cheryl drags Jim down to the church for the new reverend's (Chris Elliott) mass, which is supposed to be "the next best thing". Jim sees some familiarity on him, and remembers he was the kid he played dodge-ball with back when they were kids. Jim also remembers that he threw the ball so hard at the guy he got a fat lip (and a funny nickname) for weeks (the nickname lasted for years). When Cheryl invites the reverend over for dinner, Jim freaks out, hoping he won't remember a thing. But Jim's hopes go down the drain when the reverend confronts him and later quits the church, giving his inability to forgive Jim as a reason. Feeling guilty, Jim apologizes and even takes on Gracie and Ruby's advice on offering Reverend Pierson a chance to throw a dodge-ball back at him.
31	9	"Thanksgiving Confidential"	Philip Charles MacKenzie	Jeffrey B. Hodes & Nastaran Dibai	November 26, 2002	D-142	12.59
Cheryl is thrilled when she is offered to be in charge of the set of the girls' Thanksgiving school play. She asks Jim to help her, and he's complaining they don't spend any time together because there's always someone around them. When they finally get alone on the set, they decide to be a little wild and do it behind the Plymouth rock. Unfortunately, Andy and the PTA president Bobby Cocker (Julia Sweeney) walk in on them. They promise to keep it quiet, but Jim and his big mouth brag about it with a divorced father who criticized married life. When Jim and Cheryl's sexual adventures are spread around the PTA board, Cheryl is fired from her set duties, and Jim, feeling guilty about it, stays up all night to finish the job for Cheryl.
32	10	"The Christmas Party"	Brian K. Roberts	Bob Nickman	December 10, 2002	D-144	14.62
Jim's feud with a neighbor may also prompt one with Cheryl, who preaches peace with the neighbours so they'll be invited to the neighbors' Christmas party.
33	11	"The Brother-in-Law"	Mark Cendrowski	Jonathan Stark	December 17, 2002	D-137	12.58
Eddie (portrayed by Kimberly Williams' then fiance (now husband) Brad Paisley), a country musician who's dating Dana, comes between Jim and his brother-in-law Andy. After hearing Jim and Andy's band practice, Eddie invites them to perform with him at the House of Blues. The catch: Eddie plays keyboards instead of Andy. An excited Jim accepts anyway and hopes to keep the gig a secret from Andy, who, of course, finds out. Encouraged by his sisters, the left-out architect decides to even the score by exploring new business horizons—without his contractor-partner Jim.
34	12	"Moral Dilemma"	Philip Charles MacKenzie	Mark Driscoll	January 7, 2003	D-145	11.84
Jim takes advantage of a billing error on his credit card by using the windfall to treat Cheryl to an expensive romantic weekend. However, the error is soon discovered and set right, which puts Jim in a bad situation.
35	13	"You Gotta Love Somebody"	Philip Charles MacKenzie	John D. Beck & Ron Hart	January 21, 2003	D-149	10.23
36	14	"You Gotta Love Somebody"	Philip Charles MacKenzie	John D. Beck & Ron Hart	January 21, 2003	D-159	10.23
Jim's old friend Danny visits him, and brings his partner in crime, Laraine, with him. Cheryl and Dana offer to help Laraine pick out a dress for the police ball, and after realizing she has feelings for Danny, Cheryl convinces Jim to talk to Danny about asking her to the ball. Cheryl reveals to Jim that if it wasn't for Danny, they might never have gotten together, as they remember the time they met at a bar back in the 80's. But when Danny finally has the guts to talk to Laraine, he finds out that Andy already asked her out. Dana asks why can't she be Danny's date, since she made out with Cheryl's boyfriend the night she met Jim just so he would get out of the way. They all try to convince Andy to step aside what could be true love, but Andy reminds them of how he pretended to have a heart attack just so Jim would get rid of his girlfriend the night he met Cheryl. Finally, Andy agrees to help Danny and Laraine, as Jim and Cheryl conclude that despite all the help they got they still would have met.
37	15	"The Smell of Success"	Shelley Jensen	Jeffrey B. Hodes & Nastaran Dibai	January 28, 2003	D-150	10.31
Cheryl disapproves of Jim's latest idea, a flatulent doll named Gassy Gus, but he gets support from Andy, who builds the prototype, and Dana, who locates investors for the doll. However, the prototype backfires.
38	16	"Slumber Party"	Philip Charles MacKenzie	Sylvia Green	February 4, 2003	D-146	10.96
When Cheryl gets sick on the day of Ruby's birthday party, Jim is stuck trying to entertain a house full of little girls while Cheryl is resting in bed.
39	17	"The Ring"	Brian K. Roberts	David Feeney	February 11, 2003	D-143	9.81
When Jim and Cheryl run into his old girlfriend, Jim worries that Cheryl may find out the truth about his troubling past when she invites the woman to a dinner.
40	18	"Wonder Woman"	Peter Beyt	John D. Beck & Ron Hart	February 18, 2003	D-148	9.85
Cheryl is mugged at the mall parking lot, but instead of calling the police, she chases the guy and tackles him to get her purse back. When she tells Jim what happened, he decides to get two killer German Shepherds to guard her. Cheryl doesn't like the idea, especially because the dogs are trained in German. One night, when the girls and Kyle are sleeping over at Dana's, Jim and Cheryl get locked into the bathroom after they mistakenly order the dogs to attack them and don't know how to order them to stop. In order to escape, they gave the dogs drowsy medication. After that, Jim and Cheryl acknowledge that they could actually lose each other and start being warmer with one another.
41	19	"The Pass"	Mark Cendrowski	David Feeney	February 25, 2003	D-152	9.73
Cheryl's upset when a wealthy client, a former high school buddy of Jim's, makes a pass at her, but it's Jim's reaction, better said, that he doesn't react at all, that she's upset about.
42	20	"Dana Gets Fired"	Philip Charles MacKenzie	Howard J. Morris	March 11, 2003	D-147	10.13
When Jim vociferously objects to the way Dana gets treated by her boss, he succeeds in getting her fired. Meanwhile, Andy has problems with the plans for his birthday party.
43	21	"Bo Diddley"	Shelley Jensen	Bob Nickman	April 1, 2003	D-151	8.69
Cheryl has to have dental surgery and asks Jim to stay besides her the whole time because she's scared of dentists. While Cheryl is sedated, Andy shows up saying he met rock & roll legend Bo Diddley and Jim decides to meet him too, leaving a sedated Cheryl unattended. But Cheryl finds out when Bo Diddley sends Jim a thank you basket with edible goodies and Jim confesses. They have a fight and the next day Cheryl goes out to the movies, leaving Jim in charge of the kids. Coincidentally, tickets for Bo Diddley's concert arrive at the house, but Jim wonders if that's some of Cheryl's tests. He goes but changes his mind and return to his kids at home.
44	22	"Deal with the Devlins"	Jim Belushi	Christopher J. Nowak	April 1, 2003	D-154	9.22
Cheryl makes friends with another mom from the girls soccer team. The woman is sweet, yet a bit obnoxious. Jim is annoyed by her presence, but Cheryl insists on him being nice to her. Little by little, Cindy starts to get into their lives and tell them what to do and what not to do. Jim ends up buying a hot tub from her husband, thinking that might drive them away, but instead it only pulls them closer. They show up unexpectedly on the tub, which is the final drop for Jim. He tells Cheryl it's time for her to come clean and confess to Cindy that they don't like her. Just when she finally does that, Cindy's husband offers Jim season tickets for the Bears. In order to undo the breakup he asked Cheryl to do, Jim tells Cindy that Cheryl is under medication for mood swings and that he's willing to do them anything. They move in for a week, while Cheryl decides to take some time off at her sister's "for mental health".
45	23	"The Helmet"	Philip Charles MacKenzie	David Feeney	April 8, 2003	D-157	8.61
Pretending to be a man for an online auction, Cheryl discovers that Jim is bidding on memorabilia instead of shopping for a new dryer, but Jim thinks he's found a kindred spirit. Uncle Jesse from Full House is mentioned here.
46	24	"No Harm, No Foul"	Philip Charles MacKenzie	Harry Hannigan	April 29, 2003	D-155	8.34
A trained bird flies into Andy's head in the backyard and Gracie adopts it as her bird pet, Daphne. The bird is driving everyone insane and they all can't wait to get rid of it, but unfortunately Gracie developed a deep emotional attachment to it. When someone leaves the window opened and the bird flies out in the middle of the night, Jim and Andy team up to go look for it at the park the next morning. When they spot the bird, their first reaction is not to tell Gracie, but Jim doesn't want to lie to his daughter anymore. Later, the real owner show up at the house and Gracie is forced to say goodbye to her feathered friend.
47	25	"About a Girl"	Philip Charles MacKenzie	Sylvia Green	May 6, 2003	D-156	9.07
Dana gets attention from a single father she meets in the park by pretending to be Ruby's mother. Meanwhile, Cheryl requests that Jim exercise more often - as a special favor to her. When Jim founds out Dana's secret, he makes a deal with her. He lets her use Ruby, and Dana does his miles (which is recorded on a hip monitor).
48	26	"Mom's Boyfriend"	Philip Charles MacKenzie	Mark Driscoll	May 13, 2003	D-153	9.00
Cheryl is suspicious of her widowed mother's Maggie (Kathleen Noone) new fiancé, Frank (John Getz) when they come to visit her, but Jim and Andy think he's great. Cheryl proposes to run a background check on Frank, and Jim, Dana and Andy agrees, so Jim and Cheryl go through his luggage to find his driver’s license. When Maggie finds out, she is very upset, and declares her love of Frank. They become supportive of their marriage, and a bachelor party is held for Frank in a strip club. However, the party stops when Frank has a heart attack and dies. Jim later tells Cheryl the result of Frank’s background check: he has been a conman for years and plans to take away all of Maggie’s money. Cheryl consoles her mother and decides not to tell her the truth so that she will not feel heartbroken.
49	27	"Vegas, Baby"	Mark Cendrowski	Bob Nickman	May 20, 2003	D-158	8.85
50	28	"Vegas, Baby"	Mark Cendrowski	Jeffrey B. Hodes & Nastaran Dibai	May 20, 2003	D-160	8.85
Jim and Andy are going to Vegas on a business trip and ask Dana to join them, since they need an extra help and she happens to be their "rabbit's foot" on gambling. Cheryl decides to join them and blackmails Jim when he says no at first. Cheryl has been secretly in touch with Jim's estranged sister Roxanne and plans for them to meet in Vegas. When they get there, Jim is not pleased to see his sister and tells Cheryl that no matter what she said he's sure she hasn't changed at all. Roxanne says she needs 2,000 dollars to start her business, which Jim takes as the first step on her plan, but Roxanne won't take either his or Cheryl's money. Instead, she gets it from her new husband, Andy, who has fallen head over heels for her and married her while the rest of the family was watching a show. Andy is upset because no one approves or believes in his marriage to Roxanne. Jim goes to talk to her and walks in on her packing to run off with her ex-boyfriend. He tries to stop her, unsuccessfully. Jim and Cheryl try to break the news to Andy before the business presentation, but he's so upset that he breaks down in tears on stage. While consoling Andy, Jim forgets about the foam hose and foam just floods the stage. Jim and Cheryl stroll in Las Vegas, glad that Andy is finally recovering from Roxanne and glad that their trip is over.

=== Season 3 (2003–04) ===
No. overall	No. in season	Title	Directed by	Written by	Original release date	Prod. code	Viewers (millions)
51	1	"The Errand"	Philip Charles MacKenzie	David Feeney	September 23, 2003	301	11.98
When Jim finds out that Cheryl has been paying 7 dollars to have the groceries delivered to their house, he insists that he does the shopping himself in order to save money. Once at the supermarket, he sees how married men are "domesticated" by their wives and decides to rebel against Cheryl by shopping everything but the items on the list. Cheryl decides to turn the table on Jim and he does the same, until they end up going to a formal party wearing robes and underwear with their bodies all painted with lipstick. Cheryl finally gives in and they settle on paying the delivery boy the seven dollars in order to spare the Spice Channel subscription.
52	2	"The Packer Ball"	Phillip Charles MacKenzie	Howard J. Morris	September 30, 2003	302	11.85
Jim is horrified when he sees his son Kyle with a green Packers ball. He tries by all means to change it for a Bears one, but Kyle just can't let go of the green ball. Jim has nightmares about it and takes Kyle to his work in another attempt to get rid of the Packers ball. When he realizes there's nothing he can do about it, he does a little alteration on the ball so they can go to the Bears game peacefully.
53	3	"We Have a Bingo"	Philip Charles MacKenzie	John D. Beck & Ron Hart	October 7, 2003	303	12.25
The church is going to hold a charity fundraiser bingo game, and Jim is not willing to participate until he learns that the grand prize is a waterbed. Jim befriends an old lady who sits next to him during the game, and when she falls asleep, Jim realizes that she wins the grand prize. Unbeknownst to others, Jim switches the winning bingo card and claims that he is the winner. Later, Jim goes to find Reverend Pierson (Chris Elliott) to redeem the prize, but Pierson shows Jim the tape that he secretly filmed during the bingo game, and tells Jim that he will be consumed by his conscience. Jim does not believe Pierson, but later conscience strikes Jim hard when he tries to be with Cheryl on the waterbed.
54	4	"Getting to Know You"	Mark Cendrowski	Bob Nickman	October 14, 2003	304	10.26
Cheryl says a friend of hers got jewelry for his wife for no reason and Jim says he's probably cheating on her. After Cheryl takes it offensively that Jim won't buy her jewelry because he doesn't think he has to – after all, they are married and he isn't cheating – he goes out to shop for earrings, only to find out he knows nothing about Cheryl. After spending three days dedicating himself entirely to paying attention to Cheryl – with a bit of Andy's help – Jim finds out that Cheryl's friend was indeed cheating and they finally make up.
55	5	"The Lemonade Stand"	Mark Cendrowski	Sylvia Green	October 21, 2003	306	9.27
Jim and Cheryl encourage the girls to make a lemonade stand and raise money for their scooters. What was supposed to be a lesson about the value of the dollar turns into a racy competition among neighbors. Dana and Andy pitch in, while Cheryl tries to stay out of it – until she gets into a catfight with the neighbor's wife. Once the police is called in, Jim realizes he's lost the purpose of the lemonade stand and decides to give the girls the rest of the money for the scooters.
56	6	"ABC's and 123's"	Philip Charles MacKenzie	Warren Bell	October 21, 2003	308	9.94
Trying to lighten Ruby's homework load – and therefore look like he's helping her – Jim tells Ruby's teacher that Cheryl can't read.
57	7	"Dana Dates Jim"	Leonard R. Garner Jr.	Harry Hannigan	October 28, 2003	307	11.15
It's Halloween and Cheryl is trying to host "the" party so she can own Halloween in the neighborhood. Dana brings in her newest date, Hank, who carries an awful lot of similarities to Jim. While refusing to admit she's dating Jim, Dana realizes the truth when she accidentally pinches Jim's butt thinking it was Hank. The next day she and Cheryl have a fight over the whole situation, which leaves it up to Jim and Andy to fix the friendship between the two sisters.
58	8	"Scary Movie"	Mark Cendrowski	Jeffrey B. Hodes & Nastaran Dibai	November 4, 2003	305	14.78
Gracie and Ruby have nightmares after Jim secretly takes them to see a scary movie.
59	9	"Imaginary Friend"	Philip Charles MacKenzie	David Feeney	November 11, 2003	309	11.65
Jim creates an imaginary friend to avoid going to a couple's baby shower with Cheryl.
60	10	"Paintball"	Mark Cendrowski	Jeffrey B. Hodes & Nastaran Dibai	November 18, 2003	310	10.00
Cheryl cajoles Jim into attending a couples cooking class, which turns into a disaster, so she lets Jim pick out the next couples activity – paintball, which also turns into a disaster.
61	11	"The Empty Gesture"	Mark Cendrowski	Warren Bell	November 25, 2003	311	11.87
Cheryl starts to feel taken for granted as she prepares Thanksgiving dinner. She suffers the ultimate insult when she gets stuck on the roof after retrieving her tablecloth that Jim had fashioned into a ghost for Halloween, and no one notices her absence until she unhooks the satellite. To apologize, Jim tells her that he, Dana and Andy will prepare the dinner. Jim thinks that Cheryl, being the control freak that she is, would never allow that to happen, so he doesn't make dinner. Unfortunately, neither does Cheryl.
62	12	"Rules of Engagement"	Mark Cendrowski	Christopher J. Nowak	December 2, 2003	312	10.98
Cheryl caters to Jim's every whim to make amends for a big fight they had the night before, which Jim doesn't remember at all.
63	13	"Secret Santa"	Philip Charles MacKenzie	Sylvia Green	December 9, 2003	313	12.95
Dana admits to Cheryl that she can't afford to buy Jim a Christmas present, so Cheryl lets Dana put her name on one of the presents she bought for him. Dana innocently picks out Cheryl's big present to Jim, but when Jim is thrilled with the gift, Dana is ready to take all the credit for the gift.
64	14	"House for Sale"	Philip Charles MacKenzie	Sylvia Green	January 6, 2004	314	11.35
The Devlins place a bid on the house across the street from Jim and Cheryl, which prompts Jim to put up his house on the market as well.
65	15	"Dana Dates the Reverend"	Jim Belushi	Harry Hannigan	January 27, 2004	316	11.57
Dana and Jim both covet their reverend — she for romance, he for the pastor's prowess at bowling.
66	16	"The Best Man"	Philip Charles MacKenzie	Howard J. Morris	February 10, 2004	315	9.44
Cheryl forbids Jim from throwing his cop friend Danny a bachelor party with beer and strippers. She fears that Danny will show up at his own wedding with a hangover – as Jim did at their wedding. Jim and his buddies decide to take Danny for a swim in bitter-cold Lake Michigan – forcing a hospital visit for Danny. The wedding morning, Danny stays in bed, moaning and groaning, and Cheryl frets, but the doctor assures everyone there's nothing wrong with him. Jim realizes Danny just has cold feet, so he tries to convince him to go through with his wedding to Laraine, a fellow cop.
67	17	"Cheryl Sings"	Mark Cendrowski	Bob Nickman	February 17, 2004	317	11.22
Cheryl tries to impress her boastful cousin Mindy by posing as the lead singer of Jim's band – even though she has a terrible voice. Jim agrees to perform at Mindy's engagement party with Cheryl playing the part in order to teach his wife a lesson about embellishment by making a fool of herself. However, when Mindy tells Jim that her fiancé, Eric, is a record producer, he must decide between telling Cheryl the truth and making a bad impression on Eric.
68	18	"When You Wish to Be a Star"	Mark Cendrowski	John D. Beck & Ron Hart	February 24, 2004	318	9.91
69	19	"When You Wish to Be a Star"	Mark Cendrowski	John D. Beck & Ron Hart	March 2, 2004	319	8.41
Dana's first task at the ad agency is to cast the perfect TV family for a Disney cruise commercial. Cheryl and the kids get the job, but Dana's boss replaces Jim with a handsome actor in the role of "dad". Jim takes umbrage at being replaced as the father in a promotional shoot for a cruise line.
70	20	"No Crime, But Punishment"	Jim Belushi	Howard J. Morris	March 9, 2004	320	8.61
Gracie's recent misbehavior makes Jim think she is lying about a friend giving her a new video game.
71	21	"The Baby"	Philip Charles MacKenzie	David Feeney	March 16, 2004	321	8.28
Jim's sister, Roxanne, shows up on his doorstep, pregnant, and lets Andy believe he's the father. Jim is upset about this and confronts Roxanne about this, forcing her to admit that her ex-boyfriend got her pregnant and to also apologize to Andy.
72	22	"Who's the Boss?"	Philip Charles Mackenzie	Bob Nickman	March 30, 2004	322	10.13
Andy resents a wealthy client, but then decides to date her much to Jim's dismay.
73	23	"The Truck"	Philip Charles MacKenzie	Terry Mulroy	April 6, 2004	323	8.43
Cheryl ask Jim to use his truck to transport a giant paper-mâché grizzly bear the girls made for "spirit week" to their school – except Jim just lost his truck in an arm wrestling match and, in a gesture of macho pride, refuses to ask for it back.
74	24	"The Toilet"	Jim Belushi	Harry Hannigan	April 27, 2004	324	8.66
Cheryl promises to take Jim's opinions seriously when she decides to remodel the bathroom, until Jim insists it include a hideous high-tech stainless steel toilet – that talks.
75	25	"Trashed"	Philip Charles MacKenzie	Jeffrey B. Hodes & Nastaran Dibai	May 4, 2004	325	8.57
Pack rat Cheryl asks Jim to rent a storage unit to house seven years' worth of the kids' art projects, but Jim refuses to pay the fee, so he tosses everything out, thinking Cheryl won't notice – until she needs some of the projects for a special retirement party for Ruby's art teacher.
76	26	"The Marriage Bank"	Jim Belushi	Christopher J. Nowak	May 11, 2004	326	7.55
Thinking it might get Cheryl to let him go on a fishing trip with Andy, Jim makes a "deposit" in the "marriage bank" by agreeing to go to a couples seminar with her. Jim's plans are foiled, however, when Dr. Ted, the marriage guru, declares the whole marriage bank mentality unhealthy and Cheryl learns Jim's real motives – so that Dr. Ted must intervene.
77	27	"Everyone Gets Dumped"	Chris Brougham	Howard J. Morris	May 18, 2004	327	10.73
Jim develops a friendship with Dana's new boyfriend, despite the fact that the guy dumped Cheryl years ago.
78	28	"The Swimming Pool"	Mark Cendrowski	Bob Nickman	May 25, 2004	328	9.54
Cheryl protests when a heat wave sends the family sneaking into a vacationing neighbor's pool—until she starts sneaking over to the pool on her own.
79	29	"A Vast Difference"	Charles Kanganis	Jeffrey B. Hodes & Nastaran Dibai	May 25, 2004	329	9.84
Jim chickens out of having a vasectomy, but Cheryl is so effusive in her praise for the procedure that he's unable to admit he didn't go through with it.

=== Season 4 (2004–05) ===
No. overall	No. in season	Title	Directed by	Written by	Original release date	Prod. code	Viewers (millions)
80	1	"A Hole in One"	Charles Kanganis	Jeffrey B. Hodes & Nastaran Dibai	September 21, 2004	402	10.60
Cheryl wants Jim to give up his vices so he can get her pregnant. But Jim scores a hole in one in golfing and celebrates with beer and cigars and trades Andy's sample so that Cheryl doesn't figure out his sperm count is low.
81	2	"The Effort"	Charles Kanganis	David Feeney	September 28, 2004	401	11.24
Cheryl surprises Jim with a romantic evening, but it cuts into his planned TV boxing match. Absent: Taylor Atelian as Ruby and Billi Bruno as Gracie
82	3	"The Grill"	Mark Cendrowski	Christopher J. Nowak	October 12, 2004	405	11.19
Jim offers to give Andy an old barbecue grill, then decides Andy should pay for it, causing a huge argument between Jim and Andy, until Cheryl steps up.
83	4	"The Garage Door"	Leonard R. Garner Jr.	Howard J. Morris	October 19, 2004	404	9.75
Jim tells Cheryl that men's and women's brains are wired to remember different things. She thinks he is wrong and sexist, until they are locked in the garage because none of the girls remember the code to open it, which her toddler son is able to punch in effortlessly. She and Dana smash the door to make it look like it was broken into so Jim can't gloat. Later when Jim finds out Cheryl still tries to prove he's wrong, but she can't even remember the code moments after being told and concedes Jim's point.
84	5	"Dress to Kill Me"	Philip Charles MacKenzie	Warren Bell	October 26, 2004	403	11.81
Kyle wants to be Cinderella for Halloween. Jim is against it because he thinks he's growing up to be a sissy. Jim buys Kyle a manly costume (a dinosaur) but Kyle changes back into the dress. Jim, Andy, and Kyle all sit on the couch, Jim and Kyle persistent. Jim goes in the kitchen, sees an older Kyle who convinces Jim to let Kyle go as Cinderella. In the end, they all go as ladies and they trick-or-treat.
85	6	"Father-Daughter Dance"	Charles Kanganis	Bob Nickman	November 9, 2004	406	9.66
Ruby hurts Jim's feelings when she invites Andy to a father-daughter dance instead of him.
86	7	"Plot Twist"	Jim Belushi	Sylvia Green	November 16, 2004	407	11.31
Cheryl's mother, Maggie, wants Jim, Cheryl and the family to rest someday in a family plot she reserved years ago, but Jim insists on his own family plot—then secretly reserves a plot for himself next to a star football player.
87	8	"The Hunters"	Mark Cendrowski	Jana & Mitch Hunter	November 23, 2004	409	11.47
To prove his worth as a man, Jim, along with Andy, hunt a turkey for Thanksgiving, but on the hunt Jim is pursued, and shot, by a legendary 40- lb. psychotic bird christened "Angry Pete".
88	9	"Poking the Bear"	Charles Kanganis	John D. Beck & Ron Hart	November 30, 2004	408	11.61
Cheryl's gynecologist Ryan forbids her from having sex with Jim until the time is right to get pregnant, and Jim eats crow in order to win a huge account from a blowhard potential client.
89	10	"Stalking Santa"	Philip Charles MacKenzie	Tim Kazurinsky	December 14, 2004	411	11.33
Jim tangles with a department store Santa after the two are involved in a parking lot fender bender. Unfortunately, Jim's kids witness the skirmish and are fearful Santa won't leave them any gifts for Christmas.
90	11	"Sympathy from the Devlins"	Jim Belushi	John D. Beck & Ron Hart	January 11, 2005	412	11.14
Jim befriends his obnoxious neighbors when he believes they bring good luck when he's watching the Chicago Bulls right in action.
91	12	"Nanny-Cam"	Mark Cendrowski	Bob Nickman	January 18, 2005	413	9.11
Jim buys a nanny-cam to spy on the sitter he didn't want Cheryl to hire but learns something about Cheryl instead, prompting her to buy a camera of her own to spy on Jim.
92	13	"The Jealous Husband"	Dennis Capps	David Feeney	January 25, 2005	410	10.80
To make Cheryl feel desirable, Jim fakes a jealous rage in a restaurant and tries to teach Dana's date to do the same, but the lesson backfires when Dana fears her new beau is paranoid and possessive.
93	14	"A Crying Shame"	Mark Cendrowski	Harry Hannigan	February 8, 2005	414	9.81
Cheryl claims to like men who aren't afraid to cry, but when Jim bursts into tears after a movie, she is surprised to find herself turned off by his sensitivity.
94	15	"Guess Who's Cooking Your Dinner?"	Mark Cendrowski	Warren Bell	February 15, 2005	416	9.67
Cheryl cooks dinner for Dana and her boyfriend and lets him believe that Dana actually did the cooking.
95	16	"The Wedding Dress"	Mark Cendrowski	Sylvia Green	February 22, 2005	417	10.45
When Cheryl offers Dana the use of her wedding gown, Jim and Andy try to cover up the fact that the dress was destroyed in a fiery sports celebration years ago. This episode contradicts what was shown in a previous episode, with Dana sitting on Jim and Cheryl's couch wearing Cheryl's wedding dress when the dress was destroyed 2 weeks after Jim and Cheryl's wedding.
96	17	"The Mustache"	Mark Cendrowski	Howard J. Morris	March 8, 2005	415	10.08
An attractive delivery girl gives Jim some fashion advice, prompting him to grow a mustache, which Cheryl hates. Cheryl retaliates by becoming a brunette - but Jim loves it. After a chance meeting with the girl, Cheryl asks her to give Jim suggestions that will make him look ridiculous.
97	18	"Shall We Dance?"	Mark Cendrowski	Jeffrey B. Hodes & Nastaran Dibai	March 8, 2005	418	10.45
When Andy decides to learn how to dance for his sister's wedding, he turns to Jim, a closet dancer, for help.
98	19	"Take My Wife, Please"	Jim Belushi	Harry Hannigan	March 15, 2005	419	9.64
In order to avoid going to an opera with Cheryl, Jim asks an elderly widower to be her escort, but Cheryl actually loves the charming old man, much to Jim's dismay. Guest: Steven Gilborn as Bertram
99	20	"Spelling Bee"	Larry Joe Campbell	Christopher J. Nowak	March 22, 2005	420	9.60
Jim's pride in Gracie's new-found spelling-bee aptitude quickly turns to dismay when he has to drive her to tournaments all over the state, annoying him.
100	21	"Kentucky Fried Beltzman"	Jim Belushi	Bob Nickman	March 29, 2005	423	9.71
Jim is shocked to learn that his recently deceased friend will be buried with a rare baseball card, but the truth is, the man stole the card from Jim years prior, so Jim decides to retrieve the card, which is easier said than done.
101	22	"The Clock"	Leonard R. Garner Jr.	David Feeney and Jeffrey B. Hodes & Nastaran Dibai	April 12, 2005	422	8.59
Jim and Cheryl adjust the clocks to get the kids to bed earlier so they can have more quality time together. However, the plan backfires when they forget about it.
102	23	"The Competition"	Lynn McCracken	Daniel Egan	April 19, 2005	425	8.62
Jim, certain he will win the annual hot dog eating contest, is humiliated when instead he loses to a petit woman, and his problems are further compounded when Andy decides to date the female champion, who cannot stop annoying Jim because of this.
103	24	"The Bachelorette Party"	Dennis Capps	Howard J. Morris	May 3, 2005	424	8.39
When Cheryl's prim and proper bachelorette party disappoints Dana, Jim and Andy treat Dana to a rowdy night she'll never forget, but now, will she make it to the wedding?
104	25	"Geronimo Jim"	Jim Belushi	John D. Beck & Ron Hart	May 10, 2005	427	8.06
Cheryl and Dana think they have cause to worry when Dana's fiancé wants to race fast cars on the track, and Jim wants to take up skydiving with the man.
Special	SP	"The Scrapbook"	Jim Belushi	Sylvia Green & Harry Hannigan	May 10, 2005	TBA	8.28
Immediately following the 104th episode, a special half-hour retrospective episode takes a look at Cheryl and Jim's botched anniversary moments from years past.
105	26	"Wedding Bell Blues"	Charles Kanganis	Jana & Mitch Hunter	May 17, 2005	426	7.86
On Dana's wedding day, Jim accidentally knocks the family's favorite reverend unconscious with the car door, so he has to scramble to find a replacement preacher at the last minute, on the Season Finale.

=== Season 5 (2005–06) ===
No. overall	No. in season	Title	Directed by	Written by	Original release date	Prod. code	Viewers (millions)
106	1	"Foul Ball"	Leonard R. Garner Jr.	Christopher J. Nowak	September 20, 2005	501	8.10
The fifth season premieres with Jim sneaking off to a Cubs game with Kyle instead of taking him to his first day of kindergarten.
107	2	"The Tale of the Tape (Two-part episode)"	Jim Belushi	John D. Beck & Ron Hart	September 27, 2005	502	8.09
108	3	"The Tale of the Tape (Two-part episode)"	Jim Belushi	John D. Beck & Ron Hart	September 27, 2005	503	8.09
Jim worries that Cheryl's romantic expectations will increase when his new brother-in-law, Ryan, showers Dana with flowers and gifts. But then Jim learns that a special blues tape Cheryl supposedly made for him when they were dating, and that made him fall in love with her, was actually made for her by an old boyfriend.
109	4	"Charity Begins at Hef's"	Steve Zuckerman	Judd Pillot & John Peaslee	October 4, 2005	504	8.03
When Cheryl wins two tickets to visit Hugh Hefner at the Playboy Mansion in a charity-raising contest that Jim secretly entered her in, she decides to take Dana instead of him, much to Jim's dismay.
110	5	"The Race"	Steve Zuckerman	David Feeney	October 11, 2005	505	7.84
Out-of-shape Jim enters a 10K marathon to teach Kyle, who wants to quit basketball, a lesson about not being a quitter, but he cheats to get to the finish line first.
111	6	"Anec-Don'ts"	Leonard R. Garner Jr.	Howard J. Morris	October 18, 2005	506	7.59
Cheryl, upset that Jim thinks her daily anecdotes are boring, steals Dana's story about meeting Oprah Winfrey. Jim, now determined to out-do Cheryl, makes up a story about his construction office catching fire. But when Cheryl take the kids to see the damage, Jim and Andy, who are scrambling to make it look authentic, end up setting a real fire and cause an explosion.
112	7	"The Chick Whisperer"	Gerry Cohen	Bob Nickman	November 1, 2005	507	7.25
Jim helps Andy pick up a beautiful woman in a bar, but she turns out to be crazy—and eventually leaves Andy and stalks Jim instead.
113	8	"James & the Annoying Peach"	Gerry Cohen	Harry Hannigan	November 8, 2005	508	7.83
To teach Jim the value of communication, Cheryl doesn't speak to him for three days.
114	9	"The Dream"	Jim Belushi	David Feeney	November 15, 2005	509	8.02
Jim is being pestered by Dana to get on with renovations that seem to be taking for-ever. After he pops over to get on with it, Ryan leaves him with Dana sleeping up-stairs, where Jim over-hears her dreaming, about Jim.
115	10	"Lean on Me"	Leonard R. Garner Jr.	Sylvia Green	November 29, 2005	510	7.63
Cheryl encourages Jim to meet a former girlfriend, Melissa Evans, who wants to discuss business for lunch, and then regrets it when she becomes convinced that the old flame has romantic intentions.
116	11	"The Gift of Maggie"	Leonard R. Garner Jr.	Daniel Egan	December 13, 2005	511	7.89
When Cheryl and Dana's mother, Maggie, visits for the holidays, Jim and Cheryl compete with Ryan and Dana for her affection.
117	12	"Sex Ed Fred"	Larry Joe Campbell	Jana & Mitch Hunter	January 10, 2006	512	7.50
When Jim and Cheryl watch a sex education video that is shown at Ruby's school, Jim realizes that he was in the video when he was young, at the age thinking it was for a horror movie.
118	13	"Renewing Vows"	Jim Belushi	Bob Nickman	January 24, 2006	513	5.94
Ruby and Gracie want to get their ears pierced but Cheryl believes that this will lead to the girls growing up too quickly and convinces Jim. But Cheryl gets annoyed and lets them pierce their ears and when Jim finds out he makes his own earring and wears it on the day he and Cheryl are renewing their vows.
119	14	"The Stick"	Lauren Breiting	Judd Pillot & John Peaslee	February 7, 2006	515	6.57
It's Jim's birthday and he gets upset when Cheryl gives him gifts he does not want, but is really happy when Kyle gives him a stick for his birthday.
120	15	"Mr. Right"	Steve Zuckerman	Christopher J. Nowak	February 7, 2006	514	8.37
Cheryl and Jim get into a disagreement about Erik Estrada, and Jim tries to prove that the incident that occurred ten years ago was not wrong.
121	16	"Get Your Freak On"	Steve Zuckerman	Jana & Mitch Hunter	February 21, 2006	519	6.61
Cheryl believes she's attending a tasteful lingerie party, but is shocked to learn the hostess is selling sex toys. Out of curiosity, Cheryl buys one, but won't tell Jim. To make it worse, Jim finds the toy.
122	17	"The Grumpy Guy"	Kimberly Williams-Paisley	Sylvia Green	February 28, 2006 (Note: This episode was originally planned to air on February 21, 2006.)	517	7.81
Jim gets mad when he finds out that his neighbor, Julie (guest-star Julie Newmar), has been writing children books and basing them on him.
123	18	"Polite Jim"	Bob Koherr	Wil Fox & Michael P. Fox	March 7, 2006	518	5.84
Jim makes his own neighbor cry by complaining about his backyard barbecue, so he ends up taking polite lessons from Andy, in order to become a better person.
124	19	"Daddy Dearest"	Jim Belushi	Tracy Gamble	March 7, 2006	516	5.83
Jim believes that Bill (guest-star Joseph Bologna), the father of one of Ruby and Gracie's classmates, is actually his real father that abandoned Jim when he was a child.
125	20	"The Thin Green Line"	Larry Joe Campbell	Harry Hannigan	March 14, 2006	520	5.62
Cheryl gives her best to assure herself a spot on the Church Committee, and in order to get that, she forbids Jim to do his annual "Green Man" routine on St. Patrick's day. However, her plans are ruined when she gets arrested.
126	21	"Jim's Best Friend"	Dennis Capps	Christopher J. Nowak	March 21, 2006	521	6.29
When Andy starts playing chess with Ryan on a regular basis, Jim is convinced that he is losing his best friend.
127	22	"Belaboring the Point"	Bob Koherr	Howard J. Morris	May 2, 2006 (Note: This episode was originally planned to air on April 4, 2006.)	522	4.54
When a proud and happy Ryan announces that Dana is pregnant, Jim warns him of Dana's upcoming hormone swings, and ends up dreaming that he is pregnant.

=== Season 6 (2007) ===
No. overall	No. in season	Title	Directed by	Written by	Original release date	Prod. code	Viewers (millions)
129	1	"The Punch"	James Widdoes	Christopher J. Nowak	January 3, 2007	601	7.30
Jim believes that Cheryl has been spoiling their son Kyle for way too long, so he decides to make him a man by teaching him how to throw a perfect punch in self-defense.
130	2	"The Flannelsexual"	James Widdoes	John D. Beck & Ron Hart	January 3, 2007	602	7.21
Jim ends up on a talk show after claiming that men shouldn't let women feminize them, and then refuses to go to Dana's co-ed baby shower to prove his point.
131	3	"Guinea Pygmalion"	James Widdoes	Judd Pillot & John Peaslee	January 10, 2007	603	7.81
Jim debates on how to tell the family that he doesn't think the family pet is worth an operation.
132	4	"Hoosier Daddy"	Jim Belushi	Judd Pillot & John Peaslee	January 10, 2007	604	8.62
Jim and Cheryl try to celebrate their fifteenth wedding anniversary in a special way, but Dana and the weather seems to have other plans for them.
133	5	"Good Grief"	Jim Belushi	Judd Pillot & John Peaslee	January 17, 2007	605	6.91
When Cheryl's uncle dies, her grief is a bit more than Jim can handle, and listens to Andy and starts to believe that she is taking advantage of his good graces.
134	6	"All the Rage"	Dennis Capps	Christopher J. Nowak	January 17, 2007	606	6.91
Cheryl persuades Jim to attend an anger-management class, but he soon learns that getting mad isn't as much fun as getting even.
135	7	"Cheryl Gone Wild"	James Widdoes	Daniel Egan	January 24, 2007	607	6.19
Jim talks Ryan down when they find out Dana was in a video where the participants expose themselves, but it's a different story when Jim finds out Cheryl was in the same video. Absent: Taylor Atelian as Ruby and Billi Bruno as Gracie and Conner Rayburn as Kyle
136	8	"Deliverance"	James Widdoes	Hayes Jackson	January 31, 2007	608	5.71
Jim convinces Dana that it will be all right for Ryan to attend to the birth of a baby of a well-known star in a war-torn country, then has to step up when she goes into labor and Ryan's still stuck there. Dana gives birth to a boy and names him Tanner.
137	9	"Dino-Mite"	James Widdoes	Hayes Jackson	February 28, 2007 (Note: This episode was originally planned to air on February 21, 2007.)	610	4.95
Dana and Cheryl have a girls night out, entrusting their children to Ryan and Jim.
138	10	"Separate Ways"	James Widdoes	Warren Bell	March 7, 2007 (Note: This episode was originally planned to air on February 7, 2007. The release was then moved to February 14, 2007 and finally to March 7, 2007.)	609	7.55
Jim starts losing it when Dana and her baby spend time at their home and Cheryl suggests he sleep elsewhere.
139	11	"In Case of Jimergency"	Larry Joe Campbell	John D. Beck & Ron Hart	March 14, 2007 (Note: This episode was originally planned to air on February 28, 2007.)	611	5.69
Jim flips out over a doctor's bill, but refrains from telling Cheryl that he got the family's health insurance canceled in fear of her flipping out.
140	12	"Coach Jim"	James Widdoes	Sylvia Green	March 28, 2007	612	4.48
When Jim is coerced into coaching his daughters' basketball team, he turns into one of his idols, Mike Ditka, even though it means one of his girls quits to play for an opposing team.
141	13	"The At-Bat"	Jim Belushi	David Feeney	April 4, 2007	613	5.43
After failing to teach his son how to hit the ball, Jim is visited by Andy's future ghost in an effort to show him how his decisions affect Kyle's future.
142	14	"What Lies Beneath"	Larry Joe Campbell	Sylvia Green	April 18, 2007 (Note: This episode was originally planned to air on April 11, 2007.)	614	6.35
When Andy buys a metal detector, he digs up Jim's wedding ring in the front lawn, but gives it to Cheryl, who, in turn, tries to get Jim to fess up.
143	15	"The Grill II"	Dennis Capps	Christopher J. Nowak	April 25, 2007 (Note: This episode was originally planned to air on April 18, 2007.)	615	5.28
While Cheryl and the girls go visit Cheryl's mother, Andy puts up for sale the grill that Jim gave him, Jim freaks out, resulting in an all-out war between the two of them. Absent: Taylor Atelian as Ruby and Billi Bruno as Gracie
144	16	"Devlin in Disguise"	Jim Belushi	John D. Beck & Ron Hart	May 2, 2007	616	6.40
When overly-nice Tim and Cindy Devlin crash a birthday party to announce they're getting a divorce, Jim can't stand it. Things get even worse when Cindy latches on to Andy.
145	17	"Any Man of Mine"	Kimberly Williams-Paisley	Daniel Egan	May 9, 2007	617	6.35
Jim finds another guy to go with Cheryl on all the things she wants to do, but the plan backfires when the guy's significant other dumps him and leaves Jim with tickets to the musical.
146	18	"Jim's Birthday"	James Widdoes	Sylvia Green	May 16, 2007	618	5.40
Jim tries everything in his power (including Andy) to sabotage the birthday party Cheryl threw for him.

=== Season 7 (2008) ===
No. overall	No. in season	Title	Directed by	Written by	Original release date	Prod. code	Viewers (millions)
147	1	"Jim Almighty"	Leonard R. Garner Jr.	John D. Beck & Ron Hart	January 1, 2008	701	5.10
Jim is dismayed to learn that Cheryl has joined a dinner party club. When he grumbles that he'd like to meet the moron who invented women, God (Lee Majors) suddenly appears to defend himself. If Jim thinks he can do a better job, he's welcome to try. But Jim's new-found power backfires when Cheryl and Dana become crasser versions of himself. Then, when Andy asks God to make men more like women, Jim and Andy are transformed into overly sensitive, 'girly men'.
148	2	"The Hot Wife"	Leonard R. Garner Jr.	David Feeney	January 1, 2008	703	5.00
Cheryl finds herself unable to flirt her way into a reservation at a hot new restaurant, and she begins to worry that her beauty has faded. So Jim cooks up a scheme to cheer his wife up. When he starts to forge suggestive notes from the handsome water delivery guy, Cheryl's mojo returns. But, as things start to heat up between Cheryl and Jim, he wonders if Cheryl's really thinking about Jim or the water delivery guy. Absent: Kimberly Williams-Paisley as Dana
149	3	"Safety Last"	Leonard R. Garner Jr.	Judd Pillot & John Peaslee	January 8, 2008	702	4.59
When Cheryl takes a greater interest in general safety and health, Jim feels stifled by her new rules and regulations. Just after Cheryl forces Jim to wear an I.D. badge during his morning jog, Jim is head-butted by a buffalo on a side road. While Cheryl learns that one can't anticipate every danger out there, Jim realizes that he's willing to do whatever it takes to make his family feel secure.
150	4	"The Perfect Fight"	Steve Zuckerman	Warren Bell & Christopher J. Nowak	January 15, 2008	704	4.01
Cheryl and Jim have an evening at home without the kids and decide to stay in and just have dessert for dinner. But Jim's choice of pastries causes a spat which morphs into an all-out food fight. The next day they laugh off the night's argument; Jim is thrilled that they don't seem to have to talk things out. But then Andy, who's out for revenge on Jim for coaxing his kids to play pranks on him, counsels Cheryl to really dissect and analyze her marital arguments. Absent: Kimberly Williams-Paisley as Dana
151	5	"Cheryl Goes to Florida"	Steve Zuckerman	Sung Suh	January 22, 2008	705	6.28
As Jim struggles to take care of his three kids and the household while Cheryl is out of town taking care of her mother, another neighborhood mom takes pity on him and volunteers to help with the carpooling and cooking. Soon after, other sympathetic moms offer to help Jim out, though Jim lets each one think that she's the only household help.
152	6	"Ruby's First Date"	Kimberly Williams-Paisley	Sylvia Green	January 29, 2008	706	5.70
After Cheryl leaves town to take care of her mom, Jim realizes he can't be both mother and father to his children, so when Ruby tries to have girl talk with her dad, he reassigns "mommy power" to Aunt Dana. But when Dana gives Ruby permission to go out with an older boy, an upset Jim can't stand idly by, and he, Dana and Andy end up trailing Ruby on her date to the mall.
153	7	"Period Peace"	Leonard R. Garner Jr.	John Schwab	February 12, 2008 (Note: This episode was originally planned to air on February 5, 2008.)	712	4.91
Gracie and Ruby's constant bickering forces Jim to read their diaries to get to the cause of their fights. He learns that Gracie is coming of age, and Ruby is extremely jealous that she didn't get there first. Absent: Kimberly Williams-Paisley as Dana
154	8	"The Rendezvous"	Jim Belushi	John D. Beck & Ron Hart	February 19, 2008	707	4.85
Jim and Cheryl make plans to be intimate when she returns for a visit, but the kids demand all of her attention. In a desperate attempt to have romantic time alone together, Jim plans to meet Cheryl for a romantic tryst in the airport lounge, but is sidelined when a detective mistakenly arrests him for lewd conduct in the restroom. Absent: Kimberly Williams-Paisley as Dana
155	9	"Goodwill Hunting"	Steve Zuckerman	Jim Keily	February 26, 2008	708	4.61
Without Cheryl's knowledge, and while she is still in Florida, Jim seizes the opportunity to transform the garage into a cigar lounge and donates all of the kids' old furniture and clothes to charity. Just as he has finished unloading the last of the baby gear, Cheryl called Jim to announce that she's pregnant with twins. Jim must retrieve the stuff he gave away and get used to being a father of five. Absent: Kimberly Williams-Paisley as Dana
156	10	"All Dolled Up"	Larry Joe Campbell	Judd Pillot & John Peaslee	March 4, 2008	709	5.49
Jim is forced to host Gracie's doll-themed birthday party while a pregnant Cheryl is on bed rest. But when Gracie tells Jim she only agreed to a doll party to please Cheryl, Jim turns a girly tea party into a wild dart gun fight. Absent: Kimberly Williams-Paisley as Dana
157	11	"Pregnancy Brain"	Jim Belushi	Hayes Jackson	March 11, 2008	710	4.96
Cheryl insists Jim give her a "push present" for going through the pregnancy with twins. But when she quickly forgets her request, Jim counts on her forgetfulness ("pregnancy brain") to convince her it was her idea to turn the basement into a macho media room instead of a room for Gracie and Ruby, as he'd originally promised. Absent: Kimberly Williams-Paisley as Dana
158	12	"The Gift Certificate"	Larry Joe Campbell	Sung Suh	April 15, 2008	713	3.70
Jim realizes that Andy has forgotten to use a gift certificate that he had bought him for his birthday. Not wanting to let his money go to waste, he heads off to a restaurant and treats himself to a hefty meal, and all seems fine until Andy remembers the gift certificate just hours before it's set to expire and invites Jim to share in the feast. Absent: Kimberly Williams-Paisley as Dana and Courtney Thorne-Smith as Cheryl
159	13	"I Drink Your Milkshake"	Dennis Capps	John D. Beck & Ron Hart	April 22, 2008	714	4.05
Jim tries to stop the kids from bickering by instituting a tribunal system: should two of the kids get into a fight, all three have to work together to decide who is right. Though the system works well for solving the kids' problems, it backfires on Jim when he and Andy argue over milkshakes Andy won at a Blackhawks game and the two of them are subjected to a kids' tribunal, with Jim and Andy each trying to curry favor for their cases. Dylan and Cole Sprouse have a cameo. Absent: Kimberly Williams-Paisley as Dana and Courtney Thorne-Smith as Cheryl
160	14	"The Chaperone"	Jim Belushi	Warren Bell & Christopher J. Nowak	April 29, 2008	715	3.92
After years of dating, Andy has finally met the perfect girl. Unfortunately he's so afraid, he's not quite himself. Jim offers to take the girlfriend's daughters to a concert with Ruby and Gracie, but Andy can't help worrying about Jim's shenanigans. He leaves a dinner with Emily to go check on Jim at the concert, and realizes his concerns were justified when the girls are nowhere to be found. Absent: Kimberly Williams-Paisley as Dana and Courtney Thorne-Smith as Cheryl
161	15	"The Six-Week Curse"	Philip Charles MacKenzie	Sylvia Green	May 13, 2008 (Note: This episode was originally planned to air on May 6, 2008.)	716	4.22
Andy is convinced Emily is going to break up with him since his former girlfriends all left him after they'd dated him exactly six weeks. To get to the cause of Andy's former break-ups, Dana hypnotizes him and discovers that he sabotaged every relationship due to low self-esteem. With Andy still under hypnosis, Dana boosts his feelings of self-worth, but his new-found confidence backfires when he flirts with every woman in the restaurant while on his sixth-week date with Emily. Absent: Courtney Thorne-Smith as Cheryl
162	16	"The Cheater"	Jim Belushi	Judd Pillot & John Peaslee	May 13, 2008	717	4.45
A very pregnant Cheryl, still on bed rest, wants to have a game night, playing a game that she never loses, but Dana thinks she cheats.
163	17	"No Bedrest for the Wicked"	Philip Charles MacKenzie	David Feeney	May 27, 2008 (Note: This episode was originally planned to air on May 13, 2008.)	718	4.56
Jim is creating a long list of chores for Cheryl to take over from him when she's off bedrest, but Dana tells him that the doctor ordered Cheryl stay in bed until she goes into labor. When Jim runs into Cheryl's gynecologist at the super market and learns that she's actually been told she should be active now, he confronts Cheryl, who admits that going off bedrest could induce labor and she wants to prolong her pregnancy just a bit longer to enjoy Jim and the kids before the twins are born. Absent: Taylor Atelian as Ruby and Billi Bruno as Gracie and Conner Rayburn as Kyle
164	18	"The Devil Went Down to Oak Park"	Steve Zuckerman	Warren Bell & Christopher J. Nowak	May 27, 2008	711	4.79
Cheryl gives birth to identical twin boys, Johnathan and Gordon. Afterwards, the Devil (James Lipton) comes to collect on a deal Jim made with him years ago when he was courting Cheryl that he would give up his fifth child, Gordon, if the Devil would make Cheryl fall in love with him. Note: This is the last appearance of Kimberly Williams-Paisley as Dana before leaving the series to devote her time to motherhood. She re-appears for the series finale episode: "Heaven Opposed to Hell".

=== Season 8 (2008–09) ===
No. overall	No. in season	Title	Directed by	Written by	Original release date	Prod. code	Viewers (millions)
165	1	"The Blankie"	Larry Joe Campbell	Sung Suh	December 2, 2008	801	6.13
Jim guilts the kids into doing household chores as repercussion for losing one of the twins' blankets.
166	2	"The New Best Friend"	Steve Zuckerman	Judd Pilot & John Peaslee	December 2, 2008	802	5.46
After Dana moves away, Jim must find Cheryl a replacement best friend as soon as possible.
167	3	"Jami McFame"	Jim Belushi	Sung Suh	December 9, 2008	805	4.92
Jim and his band win a contest, providing them with the opportunity to play for child pop sensation Jami McFame.
168	4	"Andy's Proposal"	Jim Belushi	Warren Bell & Christopher J. Nowak	December 9, 2008	803	5.15
Andy plans a proposal to his girlfriend, which is quickly halted. Absent: Courtney Thorne-Smith as Cheryl
169	5	"Two for the Money"	Steve Zuckerman	Jon D. Beck & Ron Hart	December 16, 2008	804	5.22
Jim, in a last-ditch effort to earn money for Christmas gifts for his five kids, lands his twins in a role in a movie opposite Steve Guttenberg.
170	6	"Cabin Boys"	Philip Charles MacKenzie	Judd Pilot & John Peaslee	December 30, 2008	806	3.65
Jim and Andy plan a cabin retreat at Andy's girlfriend's cabin along with Emily's ex-husband. Absent: Courtney Thorne-Smith as Cheryl and Taylor Atelian as Ruby and Billi Bruno as Gracie and Conner Rayburn as Kyle
171	7	"The Ego Boost"	Jim Belushi	Warren Bell & Christopher J. Nowak	April 14, 2009	807	4.52
Jim is certain that Victoria, a former girlfriend he runs into at a restaurant, wants to rekindle their romance. Absent: Billi Bruno as Gracie
172	8	"The Yoga Bear"	Penny Marshall	David Feeney	April 14, 2009	808	4.13
Jim is jealous of Cheryl's yoga instructor. Absent: Billi Bruno as Gracie and Conner Rayburn as Kyle
173	9	"Kyle's Crush"	Jim Belushi	Jon D. Beck & Ron Hart	April 21, 2009	809	3.37
Jim prepares Kyle for his first "date" with Ruby's older piano teacher, Mandy. Absent: Courtney Thorne-Smith as Cheryl and Billi Bruno as Gracie
174	10	"The Meaningful Gift"	Philip Charles MacKenzie	David Feeney	April 21, 2009	810	3.35
Andy, desperate to impress Mandy with the perfect birthday gift, turns to Jim for advice. Jim counsels against giving fancy jewelry, urging Andy instead to give a sentimental gift to win her over. Absent: Taylor Atelian as Ruby and Billi Bruno as Gracie and Conner Rayburn as Kyle
175	11	"The Daddy Way"	Steve Zuckerman	David Feeney	April 28, 2009	811	3.11
Jim turns babysitting his twin kids into a sporting event. Absent: Billi Bruno as Gracie
176	12	"Physical Therapy"	Penny Marshall	Jon D. Beck & Ron Hart	April 28, 2009	812	3.56
Andy plays snow football with Jim, despite his girlfriend Mandy's warning. While playing, Andy gets injured and tries, with Jim's help, to hide his injuries from Mandy. Absent: Courtney Thorne-Smith as Cheryl and Taylor Atelian as Ruby and Billi Bruno as Gracie and Conner Rayburn as Kyle
177	13	"The Cooler One"	Larry Joe Campbell	Sung Suh	May 12, 2009	813	3.80
Jim tries to be the coolest dad to impress Ruby's friends, but soon realizes she's just manipulating him to get away with privileges that Cheryl would never condone. Absent: Billi Bruno as Gracie
178	14	"Happy Jim"	Lauren Breiting	Judd Pilot & John Peaslee	May 12, 2009	814	3.74
When Jim injures his back and is prescribed pain pills, the family takes advantage of an unusually mellow, docile Jim by informing him of the kids' and Andy's major mishaps, which would normally cause him to burst out in anger. Absent: Billi Bruno as Gracie
179	15	"King of the Nerds"	Philip Charles MacKenzie	Mike Murphy & John Schwab	May 26, 2009	815	3.49
Jim tries to bond with his son Kyle through sports, but Kyle identifies more with Andy, a fellow sci-fi mind.
180	16	"I Hate the High Road"	Dennis Capps	Sylvia Green	May 26, 2009	816	3.46
Cheryl makes Jim donate time to charity; Jim tries to test Cheryl's integrity.
181	17	"Diamonds Are a Ghoul's Best Friend"	Jim Belushi	Warren Bell & Christopher J. Nowak	June 2, 2009	817	3.98
Jim and Andy are haunted by ghosts after they get their girls diamonds from the grave. Absent: Billi Bruno as Gracie
182	18	"Heaven Opposed to Hell"	Jim Belushi	John D. Beck & Ron Hart	June 2, 2009	818	3.96
Jim must stand trial in heaven after he chokes on a shrimp puff. Special Guest Star: Kimberly Williams-Paisley as Dana
