= List of The Norm Show episodes =

The Norm Show is an American sitcom that aired on ABC. The series premiered at midseason in 1999, on March 24, and ran for three seasons, airing new episodes through April 6, 2001. While titled The Norm Show during the show's first season, a legal conflict with Michael Jantze's comic strip The Norm forced the show's title to be shortened to simply Norm for the series' second and third seasons.

== Series overview ==
Season	Episodes	Originally released	
Season	Episodes	First released	Last released
1	10	March 24, 1999	May 26, 1999
2	20	September 22, 1999	March 15, 2000
3	24	October 4, 2000	April 6, 2001

== Episodes ==
=== Season 1 (1999) ===
No. overall	No. in season	Title	Directed by	Written by	Original release date	Prod. code	Viewers (millions)
1	1	"Norm and the Prototype"	Andy Cadiff	Bruce Helford & Norm Macdonald	March 24, 1999	475150	13.87
Norm discovers one of his clients, Taylor (Nikki Cox) is working in a "massage parlor," and won't leave that job.
2	2	"Norm Dates a Client"	Michael Lessac	Bruce Rasmussen	March 31, 1999	225151	14.56
While helping a pathologically shy man (Fred Stoller), Norm meets a woman in a bar (Heather Paige Kent) who turns out to be Laurie's client. Laurie and Danny deal with a stinky client (Ezra Buzzington).
3	3	"Norm Dates Danny's Dad"	Michael Lessac	Rob Ulin	April 7, 1999	225153	12.31
Molly joins the department. Danny's father (Jack Warden) enjoys male companionship, but doesn't believe himself to be gay. Norm takes advantage of his denial, but Danny feels Norm is usurping his place as a son.
4	4	"While You Weren't Sleeping"	Sam Simon	Dave Caplan	April 14, 1999	225154	12.22
Laurie's stress makes it so she can't fall asleep unless Norm holds her, which gets in the way of both her boyfriend (Alastair Duncan) and a woman Norm wants to date (Caprice Benedetti). Danny gets a toupee, and apparently a girlfriend (Rebecca McFarland) comes with it.
5	5	"My Name Is Norm"	Gail Mancuso	Cheryl Holliday	April 21, 1999	225152	10.67
After Norm and a client (Casey Sander) go out drinking, the client checks them into rehab. Mr. Curtis assumes Norm is an alcoholic and lowers his workload. Guest Appearances: Veanne Cox
6	6	"The New Boss"	Sam Simon	Cheryl Holliday	April 28, 1999	225155	11.29
After Mr. Curtis tries to kill Norm in a shooting spree, Mr. Denby is made his replacement, and reduces Norm's workload to nothing. Norm burns that deal by getting Denby to lighten up on Laurie.
7	7	"Denby's Kid"	Steve Zuckerman	Story by : Steve Zuckerman; Teleplay by : Steve Gabriel & Sarah McLaughlin	May 5, 1999	225159	10.42
Mr. Denby's son Jason (Michael Bacall) doesn't want to go to military school, but culinary school. Norm backs him, opposing his dad, until he discovers Jason likes to cook with marijuana. Norm's probation officer Ed (George Mudock) investigates. Laurie and Molly deal with a cat lady (Pat Crawford Brown).
8	8	"Drive, Norm Said"	Pamela Fryman	Story by : Bruce Rasmussen; Teleplay by : Cheryl Holliday & Frank Sebastiano	May 12, 1999	225157	10.67
Norm has sex with his evil coworker Kyra (Vicki Lewis), who becomes clingy. He helps Laurie pass a driving test. Danny and Molly find a hairy man (Andy Siegel) a job.
9	9	"Norm, Crusading Social Worker"	Gerry Cohen	Story by : Rob Ulin; Teleplay by : Dave Caplan & Frank Sebastiano	May 19, 1999	225156	10.34
Norm is made the "agony of defeat" on Wide World of Sports, and wants to be reinstated to play hockey for a charity game. To impress the review board, he lets an elderly client, Sal (Abe Vigoda), move in with him.
10	10	"Norm's Coach"	Sam Simon	Frank Sebastiano	May 26, 1999	225158	10.02
To get ready for his charity hockey game, Norm calls his old coach, "The Panther" (Michael McShane), who's in far worse shape than Norm is.

=== Season 2 (1999–2000) ===
No. overall	No. in season	Title	Directed by	Written by	Original release date	Prod. code	Viewers (millions)
11	1	"Norm vs. Love"	Steve Zuckerman	Cheryl Holliday	September 22, 1999	225801	11.43
Norm gets Taylor (Nikki Cox) a job at the office but Max assumes she's still hooking. Norm meets up with his probation officer Shelly Kilmartin (Faith Ford). Guest Appearances: Dennis Miller, Richard Libertini
12	2	"Norm Pimps Wiener Dog"	Steve Zuckerman	Rob Ulin	September 29, 1999	225802	10.81
Norm buys a $1200 Hank Aaron baseball card on credit from Al (Bob Einstein). He tries to pay the debt off by breeding Wiener Dog for stud fees. Meanwhile, Norm gives the card to a young kid Jimmy (Michael Welch) but only to impress Shelly.
13	3	"Artie Comes to Town"	Sam Simon	Dave Caplan	October 6, 1999	225803	10.19
Norm gets toys for his office’s orphan donation program with the help of his brother (Artie Lang), who just came to town. Despite both money and Landlady (Patricia Belcher) troubles, Norm tells Artie to move in with him. Note: There is a Pokémon scene at the start of the episode.
14	4	"Norm vs. Death"	Shelley Jensen	Bruce Rasmussen	October 13, 1999	225804	8.94
Norm reveals his fear of death after Danny's father dies. Laurie takes Norm to see Phil (Bill Macy), a grief counselor, to help him cope. Norm confronts his fear of death at the funeral, where Danny finds out during the eulogy that his father was gay. Guest Appearances: Andrea Martin, Holmes Osborne
15	5	"Norm and Shelly In Love"	Rich Correll	Lloyd Garver	October 20, 1999	225805	10.54
Norm and Shelly kiss which seems sweet, until she finds out he's gambling again. This prompts her to punish Norm and refusing to date him, that is until she realizes her true feelings. Guest Appearance: Lou Rawls
16	6	"Laurie Runs for Office"	Gerry Cohen	Brett Baer & Dave Finkel	October 27, 1999	225806	10.01
Laurie runs for city council after discovering that the incumbent councilman Krantz (Michael Gross) is heartless and corrupt. Laurie’s poll numbers drop after Norm and Artie get caught trying to frame Krantz. Guest Appearances: Al Ruscio, Josie DiVincenzo
17	7	"Norm and Shelly Break-Up"	Gerry Cohen	Bruce Rasmussen	November 3, 1999	225807	9.41
Mr. Denby is now Laurie’s campaign manager in her unsuccessful run for city council. Norm slips up and says "I love you" to Shelly on the phone, so he pretends it didn’t mean anything. Meanwhile, Shelly doesn’t like living in the city and wants to move to Colorado. Guest Appearance: Brad Dourif
18	8	"Gambling Man"	Joe Regalbuto	Dave Caplan	November 10, 1999	225808	14.63
Norm is gambling again (which breaches his probation), so Laurie convinces everyone that he needs an intervention. After they track Norm down to an illegal gambling parlor, all (Laurie, Artie, Danny, and Norm) are arrested and jailed following a police raid. (Note: this storyline continues in the next episode) Guest stars: Drew Carey, Ryan Stiles, Diedrich Bader and Tom Arnold.
19	9	"Norm vs. Norm"	Gary Halvorson	Steve Gabriel	November 17, 1999	225809	12.82
All but Artie are bailed out of jail, but a bookie (Garry Marshall) owes Norm money, enough for Artie’s bail. Taylor’s 2-month probation at the office is up, so she worries that Denby won’t keep her on. Taylor and Danny learn that Denby’s wife (Janet Carroll) wants a divorce. Guest stars: Randall Carver, Lyle Kanouse
20	10	"Norm vs. Denby"	Ted Wass	Cheryl Holliday	November 24, 1999	225811	11.43
Norm and Mr. Denby compete for the same woman (Sally Kellerman). Laurie has trouble dealing with Wendy (Julie Hagerty), a former high school classmate who unexpectedly shows up at the office.
21	11	"Norm vs. The Boxer"	Tommy Thompson	Frank Sebastiano	December 1, 1999	225810	11.16
After witnessing a 15-year-old has a hidden talent, Norm encourages him to fight in a boxing tournament in order to pay off his $10,000 debt to his bookie. Special guest star: Richard Pryor
22	12	"Norm vs. Christmas"	Gerry Cohen	Frank Sebastiano	December 15, 1999	225812	11.98
Norm and Artie find out that Laurie hates Christmas, so they decide to cheer her up, but with some consequences.
23	13	"Norm vs. The Evil Twin"	Steve Zuckerman	Brett Baer & Dave Finkel	January 5, 2000	225813	10.98
Laurie's twin sister "Jamie" (also portrayed by Laurie MetCalf) visits. While Jamie brags about her suburban lifestyle, Laurie (in a panic) says Norm is her boyfriend.
24	14	"Norm vs. The Oldest Profession"	Steve Zuckerman	Story by : Sarah Folkman; Teleplay by : Dave Caplan & Cheryl Holliday	January 19, 2000	225814	10.47
Norm "steals" a job from a client which turns out to be a male escort service.
25	15	"Norm vs. Jenny"	Gerry Cohen	Cheryl Holliday	January 26, 2000	225815	9.67
Norm meets the woman of his dreams.
26	16	"Norm vs. Fitz"	Joe Regalbuto	Frank Sebastiano & Rob Ulin	February 9, 2000	225817	10.75
Norm – after finding out Jenny is engaged to another – still hangs out with Jenny, but is still is trying to win her over.
27	17	"Norm vs. The Wedding"	Gerry Cohen	Cheryl Holliday	February 16, 2000	225818	10.27
Norm crashes Jenny's wedding because he doesn't want her to marry Fitz. He tells her he wants to marry her but he wants to wait until her mother dies. Her mother drugged Norm and locked him in a closet so he couldn't ruin the wedding but Norm kicked a hole through the door to free himself. Jenny told Fitz she didn't love him and she went back to Norm.
28	18	"Norm vs. Fear" "Norm's name that movie contest I"	Shelley Jensen	Story by : Steve Gabriel; Teleplay by : Ed Lee & Curtis Chin	March 1, 2000	225819	14.15
After Norm injures his back he admits his fear of doctors. Denby threatens to have Norm thrown in jail if he misses any more time. Norm vows to see a doctor on the condition that Danny, Laurie & Artie conquer their personal demons.
29	19	"Retribution"	Gerry Cohen	Dave Caplan	March 8, 2000	225820	9.50
Fitz tries to get even with Norm for stealing Jenny from him by trying to ruin his and Jenny's lives.
30	20	"Laurie Loses It"	Steve Zuckerman	Brett Baer & Dave Finkel	March 15, 2000	225816	9.04
After Laurie loses another award for social work, she vows to work harder but feels terrible. Danny detects Taylor is cheating.

=== Season 3 (2000–01) ===
No. overall	No. in season	Title	Directed by	Written by	Original release date	Prod. code	Viewers (millions)
31	1	"Norm vs. the Sacrifice"	Steve Zuckerman	Brett Baer & Dave Finkel	October 4, 2000	225822	10.12
Norm is given an ultimatum by Denby. Either he'll behave at work or he'll make everyone's life difficult in the office. Laurie is dating a new guy. Note: By production code, this episode was produced with the season 2 episodes.
32	2	"I've Got a Crush on You"	Shelley Jensen	Rob Ulin	October 6, 2000	226603	7.51
Norm tries to find out who has a thing for him when he finds printer papers of someone expressing feelings for him. Danny is trying to find the perfect proposal for Taylor and Shelly returns.
33	3	"Taylor Leaves"	Steve Zuckerman	Dave Caplan	October 13, 2000	226604	7.15
Laurie now knows it's Taylor who has feelings for Norm even though she's with Danny.
34	4	"The Norm Law"	Steve Zuckerman	Cheryl Holliday	October 20, 2000	226605	5.82
An investigation is launched after Norm "helps" with a juvenile girls group which later becomes a riot.
35	5	"Norm vs. Halloween"	Shelley Jensen	Bruce Rasmussen	October 27, 2000	226601	6.12
Norm takes kids out for trick or treating. Danny starts dating a new lady, whom he dresses up like his ex.
36	6	"Norm and the Hopeless Cause"	Shelley Jensen	Lawrence Broch	November 3, 2000	226602	6.41
Norm meets Laurie's friend Rebecca (Courtney Thorne-Smith) who is a lesbian, and he finds himself attracted to her.
37	7	"Norm vs. Youth (Part 1)"	Bob Saget	Lloyd Garver	November 10, 2000	226608	6.91
Laurie dates a younger guy, and is made fun of by the others as a result. Norm dates a younger girl.
38	8	"Norm vs. Youth (Part 2)"	Steve Zuckerman	Dave Caplan	November 24, 2000	226610	7.41
Norm dates an older woman who has a surprise pertaining to Laurie's younger boyfriend.
39	9	"Norm vs. Tennis"	Steve Zuckerman	Matt Tarses	December 1, 2000	226606	7.32
Norm plays tennis with Shelly and he starts to let her win when he finds out that winning turns her on. Artie seeks Laurie's help when he wants to lose weight.
40	10	"Norm vs. The Kid"	Tommy Thompson	Brett Baer & Dave Finkel	December 8, 2000	226607	4.56
Shelly, Laurie, Danny and Mr. Denby take in orphans while they search for a family who's willing to adopt all of them. They find a family that's willing to take them all but one of the orphans, because he has a criminal record.
41	11	"Norm vs. Schoolin'"	Shelley Jensen	Matt Tarses	December 15, 2000	226611	5.95
Norm and Mr. Denby have to go to social workers' school. Danny and Shelly pretend to be the married couple who were Billy's previous foster parents so that he can be adopted.
42	12	"Norm vs. Freud"	Steve Zuckerman	Cheryl Holliday	January 5, 2001	226609	6.80
Norm agrees to go to group therapy and discovers that the reason he has problems with Mr. Denby is because he has issues with his father. Danny and Artie invest in a weight loss gadget but then discover the horrible side effects.
43	13	"Norm vs. Dad"	Shelley Jensen	Lawrence Broch	January 12, 2001	226612	6.37
Norm deals with some father issues, and his antagonistic dysfunctional relationship with his dad. Guest star: Tom Smothers as Norm's dad
44	14	"Denby Quits"	Wil Shriner	Brett Baer & Dave Finkel	January 26, 2001	226613	5.55
Denby gets tired of dealing with Norm and quits. Laurie finds she hates being Denby's replacement.
45	15	"Norm Lets Go"	Tommy Thompson	Cindy Caponera	February 2, 2001	226615	6.85
Norm accepts that he and Shelly will never get back together, and decides to move on. Danny and Shelly go on a date. Meanwhile, Laurie teaches Denby how to dance so he won't make a fool of himself at an upcoming banquet.
46	16	"Norm vs. Danny and Shelly"	Shelley Jensen	Cheryl Holliday	February 9, 2001	226614	6.21
After sleeping with Norm, Taylor tells him that she's still in love with Danny but she doesn't want Norm to tell him. Mr. Denby complains to Laurie about the conditions in the men's room.
47	17	"Norm and Wiener Dog vs. Fatherhood"	John Fuller	Dave Caplan	February 16, 2001	226616	6.60
Mr. Denby takes Norm to court for possession of the puppies that his dog Fifi had with Wiener Dog. Norm is thrown out when he can't pay the rent.
48	18	"Norm vs. Homelessness"	Steve Zuckerman	Steve Gabriel	February 23, 2001	226617	6.01
Mr. Denby and Danny go on a business trip and try to pick up women but have no luck. Norm uses Mr. Denby's apartment for a date and gets him evicted when the landlady finds out he has a dog, so he has to move in with Laurie as well.
49	19	"Norm Is Fat"	Steve Zuckerman	Lawrence Broch	March 2, 2001	226618	6.01
When Shelly returns she sees that Norm is fat, so he recounts the story that led to his vast weight gain.
50	20	"Norm vs. Deception"	Wil Shriner	Leslie Rieder	March 9, 2001	226619	6.50
Norm and Laurie fake a relationship and it helps Laurie get a man, but Norm discovers that Shelly is still in love with him. Mr. Denby is afraid to catch Danny's cold.
51	21	"Norm vs. Cuba"	Shelley Jensen	Cheryl Holliday & Brad Rasmussen	March 16, 2001	225821	5.44
Laurie and Norm care for a Cuban kid who is left alone. Note: By production code, this episode was produced with the season 2 episodes.
52	22	"Norm's Free"	Shelley Jensen	Brett Baer & Dave Finkel	March 23, 2001	226621	6.80
Norm is freed from his community service early and a monkey attacks Danny.
53	23	"Norm Comes Back"	Shelley Jensen	Curtis Chin	March 30, 2001	226622	5.43
Norm is hired as Mr. Sweeney's assistant. A psychic tells Shelly that she and Norm will be married.
54	24	"Norm vs. Shelly's Old Flame"	Gerry Cohen	Edd Lee	April 6, 2001	226620	5.76
Norm is shocked when he gains the ability to hear other men's thoughts, but he uses it to his advantage when he finds out that an old boyfriend of Shelly's is trying to steal her away from him.
