= The Norm Show =

American television sitcom (1999–2001)

- Also known as: Norm
- Genre: Sitcom
- Created by: Bruce Helford; Norm Macdonald
- Starring: Norm Macdonald; Laurie Metcalf; Bruce Jarchow; Ian Gomez; Amy Wilson; Max Wright; Artie Lange; Nikki Cox; Faith Ford
- Theme music composer: W. G. Snuffy Walden
- Opening theme: "Too Bad" performed by Doug and the Slugs
- Composer: W. G. Snuffy Walden
- Country of origin: United States
- Original language: English
- No. of seasons: 3
- No. of episodes: 54 (list of episodes)

Production
- Executive producers: Bruce Helford; Deborah Oppenheimer; Bruce Rasmussen; Rob Ulin
- Producers: Norm Macdonald; Frank Sebastiano
- Camera setup: Multi-camera
- Running time: 22–24 minutes
- Production companies: Mohawk Productions; Warner Bros. Television

Original release
- Network: ABC
- Release: March 24, 1999 – April 6, 2001

The Norm Show is an American television sitcom that was produced by Mohawk Productions and Warner Bros. Television that ran on ABC from March 24, 1999, to April 6, 2001. Starting in September 1999, the show's title was shortened to Norm. The series starred Norm Macdonald, who created the series with Bruce Helford.

== Plot ==
The show focused on the life of Norm Henderson (Norm Macdonald), a former NHL hockey player who is banned for life from the league because of gambling and tax evasion. To avoid jail time for these crimes, Norm must perform five years of community service as a full-time social worker. Other characters in the show included fellow social workers Laurie Freeman (Laurie Metcalf), Danny Sanchez (Ian Gomez), and Danny's sometime girlfriend and former prostitute Taylor Clayton (Nikki Cox). Norm's boss on the program for the first several episodes was named Anthony Curtis (Bruce Jarchow). This character was quickly replaced by a new boss, Max Denby (Max Wright), whom Norm frequently antagonized and pranked.

The second season of the show added Artie Lange as Norm's half-brother Artie, and Faith Ford as Shelly Kilmartin, Norm's probation officer and love interest.

== Episodes ==
Season	Episodes	Originally released	
Season	Episodes	First released	Last released
1	10	March 24, 1999	May 26, 1999
2	20	September 22, 1999	March 15, 2000
3	24	October 4, 2000	April 6, 2001

== Cast and characters ==
=== Main cast ===
- Norm Macdonald as Norm Henderson: Norm is a former NHL hockey player, though he was purportedly not very good. However, constant gambling and tax evasion catch up with him – leading him to being banned from hockey forever. He avoids jail time by agreeing to five years of community service as a social worker. Norm often shows complete disregard for his work, and is a compulsive gambler. Norm also had a deep fear of death, attributed to his parents telling him nothing good would happen to him after he died.
- Laurie Metcalf as Laurie Freeman: Laurie was previously Norm's social worker. Once he starts working at the office, she becomes his co-worker and best friend. Often (and usually to her exasperation), she has to guide Norm in social work. Laurie is a dedicated social worker and frequently makes noteworthy proposals to help clients. She also has a twin sister (also played by Metcalf), with whom she is argumentative.
- Bruce Jarchow as Anthony Curtis (episodes 1–5): As Norm's first boss, he had a great deal of difficulty managing Norm. Mr. Curtis has a daughter, with whom Norm ends up having sex. This causes Mr. Curtis to snap, and doesn't appear in the show from then on.
- Ian Gomez as Danny Sanchez: Another social worker at the office, Danny is usually portrayed as quite effective at his job. He is sometimes Norm's partner-in-crime – aiding in his gambling pool and other schemes.
- Amy Wilson as Molly Carver (Season 1): Molly is hired as a new social worker a little while after Norm's sentence began. She believes that her education and street smarts enable her to be an effective social worker without anyone's help. She disappears without explanation after the first season.
- Max Wright as Max Denby (episodes 6–54): Norm's second boss, with whom he has an antagonist relationship. Mr. Denby is a divorcee, with a son and a daughter – neither of whom has a good relationship with him. Details about Mr. Denby's past include serving in the military (where he shot six of his own men) and working for the Nixon administration (though he was not involved in the infamous Watergate break-in).
- Artie Lange as Artie Henderson (Seasons 2–3): Artie is Norm's overweight paternal half-brother. Artie at times lived in Norm's shadow while growing up. When he comes to visit Norm, he seems to turn things around and had become a bonafide success. However, he later admits his business partner has ripped him off, and that he lost everything, and subsequently takes up various jobs. In the third season, Artie becomes a bartender at the gang's usual hangout. It is also revealed that in the tenth grade he knew The Drew Carey Show's Mimi Bobeck (then known as Miriam).
- Nikki Cox as Taylor Clayton (Season 2; guest Season 1, recurring Season 3): A prostitute, Taylor is Norm's first client after he became a social worker. She gives up being a prostitute and ends up working in the office. She at different times forms relationships with Danny and Norm.
- Faith Ford as Shelly Kilmartin (Season 3; recurring Season 2): In the second season, Shelly is introduced as Norm's probation officer. Norm is immediately attracted to her and pursues her, but she insists they keep their relationship professional. However, she eventually develops feelings for him and they begin an on-and-off relationship.

=== Recurring ===
- Wiener Dog: A Dachshund, Wiener Dog lives in Norm's apartment and is a devoted pet. He is shown to have above average intelligence and often bests Norm in games of skill.
- Patricia Belcher as Landlady (seasons 2–3): Norm's frequently angry landlady, though she is usually angry because Norm consistently fails to pay the rent. Her name never revealed, and she is just simply known as "Landlady".
- Kate Walsh as Jenny (seasons 2–3): Norm's other main love interest. Laurie sets them up on a blind date and after some hi-jinx, they develop an on-and-off relationship. She disappears after the second season (save for an out-of-order season 3 episode) without explanation.

=== Guest stars ===
Jack Warden guest-stars in one episode as the father of Ian Gomez's character, and fakes a grab at Norm's crotch (as he did in Dirty Work).

Richard Pryor did his final screen appearance as Mr. Johnson in one episode.

== Production ==
Originally airing on Wednesday nights after The Drew Carey Show, the series was one of the top-rated sitcoms on ABC among adults 18-49 during its first season. In between the first and second seasons, ABC shortened the series' title to Norm to avoid a legal conflict with Michael Jantze's comic strip The Norm. ABC continued to keep the series on Wednesdays for its second season, though initially moved it an hour earlier. In November, the series moved back to its original timeslot, before moving back again in January. This caused ratings in the second season to fluctuate. When the series was renewed for a third season, ABC moved Norm to Friday nights (also known as the Friday night death slot), in an effort to create a new "Working Comedy" Friday night comedy lineup after the network disbanded TGIF. The third season saw even more time changes and ratings fluctuations. This, in addition to low ratings, caused ABC to cancel the series in May 2001.

== Home media ==
On September 7, 2010, Shout! Factory released The Norm Show: The Complete Series on DVD in Region 1. The 8-disc set features all 54 episodes of the series as well as a handful of running commentaries (only in seasons 1 and 2) by Norm Macdonald and Bruce Helford.

== Reception ==
=== Critical reception ===
Initial critical reviews were mixed with the show's first season receiving a 54% rating on Rotten Tomatoes. In a negative review of the show, Michele Greppi with the New York Post stated of Laurie Metcalf's presence on the show "Metcalf’s energy just comes across as desperation when she’s working with a man who has no inflection, no expression, and no moves and brings nothing to would-be comedy except dead weight." In a more positive review, Howard Rosenberg of the Los Angeles Times stated "Macdonald's ability to do this without being stupid—his character is actually quite smart—is key to this series, some of which is just a hoot, its humor perfectly tailored to its star's offbeat sardonic style."

=== Ratings ===
Season	Episodes	Timeslot (EDT)	Season premiere	Season finale	TV season	Rank	Rating
1	10	Wednesday 9:30 pm	March 24, 1999	May 26, 1999	1998–99	46	8.1
2	20	Wednesday 8:30 pm (1–7, 14–20); Wednesday 9:30 pm (8–13)	September 22, 1999	March 15, 2000	1999–2000	48	7.8
3	24	Wednesday 9:30 pm (1); Friday 9:00 pm (2–11); Friday 9:30 pm (12–14); Friday 8:30 pm (15–24)	October 3, 2000	April 6, 2001	2000–01	109	4.3
