= Bruce Jarchow =

American actor

- Born: May 19, 1948 (age 78); Evanston, Illinois, U.S.
- Occupation: Actor
- Years active: 1980–present

Bruce Jarchow (born May 19, 1948) is an American film, television and stage actor. He began his career in Chicago as a member of The Second City Mainstage. He received the 1981 Joseph Jefferson Award for Actor in a Revue for "Well, I'm Off to the Thirty Years' War". His notable roles include Lyle Ferguson in the film Ghost, Dr. Mascelli in Outbreak, and Principal Scampi in the television series Weird Science.

His television appearances include recurring roles in Seinfeld, Parks and Recreation, Desperate Housewives, Work in Progress, ER, Honey, I Shrunk the Kids: The TV Show, The Norm Show, What About Joan and According to Jim.

He is also featured in the films The Weather Man, Stranger than Fiction, Somewhere in Time, Continental Divide, The Puppet Masters, Big and Music from Another Room.

== Filmography ==
=== Film ===
Bruce Jarchow film credits
Year	Title	Role	Notes
1980	My Bodyguard	Roberto	
1980	Somewhere in Time	Bones, in 1912	
1981	Continental Divide	Hellinger	
1986	The Manhattan Project	Interrogator	
1987	Radio Days	Ad Man	
1988	Big	Photographer	
1988	Scrooged	Wayne	
1990	Ghost	Lyle Ferguson	
1991	The Doctor	Tim	
1993	Mad Dog and Glory	Detective at Crime Scene	
1993	My Life	Walter	
1994	The Puppet Masters	Barnes	
1995	Outbreak	Dr. Mascelli	
1998	Krippendorf's Tribe	Dr. Andrews, Chester Hill	
1998	Sour Grapes	Dr. Dean	
1998	Music from Another Room	Richard	
2001	Betaville	Headmaster	
2005	The Weather Man	Viewer	
2006	Stranger than Fiction	Commuter	
2008	The Promotion	Party Guest	
2008	The Express: The Ernie Davis Story	Dr. Hewlett	
2012	Close Quarters	Kowalski	
2014	Warren	Leonard Copley	

=== Television ===
Bruce Jarchow television credits
Year	Title	Role	Notes
1986	The Equalizer	Flynn	Episode: "Pretenders"
1993–1997	Seinfeld	Doctor / Mooney	2 episodes
1994–1998	Weird Science	Principal Scampi	32 episodes
1997–2000	Honey, I Shrunk the Kids: The TV Show	H. Gordon Jennings	17 episodes
1999	The Norm Show	Anthony Curtis	5 episodes
2001	What About Joan	Bob	5 episodes
2004	ER	Dr. Hammond	1 episode
2004–2009	According to Jim	(various)	6 episodes
2006	Desperate Housewives	Samuel Bormanis	4 episodes
2009	Parks and Recreation	Frank Schnable	1 episode
2020–2021	Work in Progress	Edward	6 episodes
