= Bob Nickman =

American actor

- Occupations: Comedian; actor; television producer; television writer
- Years active: 1980s–present

Bob Nickman is an American comedian, actor, television producer, and television writer.

As a television producer/writer, his credits include Mad About You, Freaks and Geeks, Danny, According to Jim, Big Day, Rita Rocks and Roseanne.

As an actor, he appeared in four episodes of Roseanne from 1994 to 1995, as well as guest starring in an episode of Designing Women in 1990, his acting debut. He also appeared in the films Shakes the Clown (1991) and Crossing the Bridge (1992).

He is a native of Cleveland, Ohio and performed stand-up comedy for much of the 1980s.
