= Music from Another Room (film) =

1998 film by Charlie Peters

- Promotional film poster
- Directed by: Charlie Peters
- Written by: Charlie Peters
- Produced by: John Bertolli; Brad Krevoy; Steve Stabler; Bradley Thomas
- Starring: Jude Law; Jennifer Tilly; Gretchen Mol; Martha Plimpton; Brenda Blethyn; Jon Tenney; Jeremy Piven; Vincent Laresca; Jane Adams
- Cinematography: Richard Crudo
- Edited by: Carroll Timothy O'Meara
- Music by: Richard Gibbs
- Production companies: Orion Pictures; Motion Picture Corporation of America
- Distributed by: MGM Distribution Co. (North America); Capella Films (Overseas)
- Release date: April 24, 1998
- Running time: 104 minutes
- Country: United States
- Language: English

Music from Another Room is a 1998 American romantic comedy film directed by Charlie Peters and starring Jude Law, Jennifer Tilly, Gretchen Mol, Martha Plimpton, and Brenda Blethyn. The story is about a struggling artist who believes he is destined to marry the young woman whose birth he assisted with as a child. The film was intended for theatrical release but was ultimately distributed direct-to-video.

== Plot ==
On Thanksgiving 1973, five-year-old Danny Kowalski accompanies his doctor father Hank to visit family friend Grace Swan. While they are there, Grace unexpectedly goes into labor with her fourth baby. Because Hank had been enjoying Thanksgiving wine all day, he asks his son to help assist him with the birth. Danny is tasked with using his hands to unwrap the umbilical cord from the baby's neck. The birth is successful and the baby girl is named Anna. Danny, astounded by the whole event, happily announces "I'm going to marry her!"

Twenty-five years later, Danny has returned to the United States from England, where he had been raised. Danny, now a mosaic tile restorer hoping to become a master tiler, is interviewing for a recommended restoration. He finds a modest apartment owned by a bakery shop couple, who offer him a delivery job until the tile work starts. He gets lost on his first delivery and stops for directions at a house with a distinctive swan bell. The house is still inhabited by the Swan family, and before Danny leaves, he sees elder daughter Nina and the now grown Anna. He completes the delivery but is mystified at the coincidence. He tells his kind baker boss and his wife about the chance reunion, and they fill him in a bit on the Swans' story and what he missed.

Soon, the Swan family orders a cake from the bakery and Danny leaves to deliver it in the hopes of seeing Anna. He crashes his bike into a car outside the home and loses consciousness. He wakes up inside the house, meeting Grace and her family. Nina reveals her lifelong blindness and the fears that keep her from a normal life. He meets the brother Billy and Billy's wife, Irene, who is distraught over her husband's infidelities and exhibits bizarre behaviors. Danny reacquaints himself with Anna's father Richard and Anna's sister Karen. He is invited to stay for dinner, during which he learns of Anna's recent engagement to her boyfriend, Eric. They converse about love and when asked what love is like, Danny states that it is like hearing music from another room so beautiful that it compels one to hum along.

Danny begins his job as a mosaic tiler artist at the local museum. A few days later when he is with Anna again, he asks her to run away with him and marry him. However, Anna rejects him kindly. He confesses his love for Anna to his coworkers who give him a trick, two-headed coin, instructing him to tell Anna: "Heads you love me, tails I leave you alone." Danny uses it the next time he is alone with Anna, but she claims the right to read the result and calls "tails".

In the meantime, Danny has befriended the Swan family, helping Nina with her self-imposed fears. He sees that Anna's motherly way with her siblings is a bit stifling, and works at helping her lighten her grip. Danny accompanies Nina to a local dance where she meets Jesus, a young tradesman. By the time Jesus and Nina have become a couple, Grace is dying from an illness. Anna has grown feelings for Danny and one day rushes to his home to confess her love for him, claiming she lied and that the coin flip read "heads." The two sleep together, after which Anna leaves to go tell Grace she truly loves Danny. Irene and Billy have another one of their confrontations, ending with her shooting him in the foot.

The previous night, Nina and Jesus had eloped. Nina informed Grace, who was thrilled and happy for her daughter. When Anna arrives home to tell her mother about her new relationship with Danny, she discovers she is too late and Grace died that night. At Grace's funeral, Anna tells Danny that she has already told Eric about their affair. However, Danny tells Anna he is leaving town in a couple of days. He ties up business at the tile site, making something special for the wall and covering Anna's name, which he had painted over his bed. Later, Eric announces to the family that he and Anna will soon leave for Paris to get married themselves. Nina is convinced that this decision for Anna is all wrong. The next day, Nina has Anna meet her at the site of Danny's tile work, which turns out to be swans inscribed with a message for Anna. Nina insists that Anna belongs with Danny and advises her to go after him.

Anna rushes to the train station and begs Danny to take her with him, no matter where he is going. Danny says this adventure won't last but Anna holds up a regular coin and says if it lands heads, she will go with him; tails, she'll leave him alone. Anna flips the coin and Danny puts his foot over it when it lands. Without looking at the coin, he declares it is heads, and the two kiss.

== Cast ==
- Jude Law as Danny Kowalski
  - Cory Buck as young Danny
- Jennifer Tilly as Nina Swan
- Gretchen Mol as Anna Swan
- Martha Plimpton as Karen Swan
  - Sara Paxton as young Karen
- Brenda Blethyn as Grace Swan
- Jon Tenney as Eric
- Jeremy Piven as Billy Swan
  - Joe Pichler as young Billy
- Vincent Laresca as Jesus
- Jane Adams as Irene Swan
- Bruce Jarchow as Richard Swan
- Kevin Kilner as Hank Kowalski
- Jan Rubes as Louis Klammer
- Judith Malina as Clare Klammer
- Jon Polito as Lorenzo Palmieri

== Production ==
Filming locations in the Los Angeles area included Pasadena and the Park Plaza Hotel.

Music from Another Room features on its soundtrack "Truly Madly Deeply" by Savage Garden and the song "Day After Day", written by Julian Lennon and Mark Spiro and performed by Julian Lennon. A Los Angeles test screening originally had U2's "With or Without You" song featured in the end credits.

== Critical reception ==
On the review aggregator website Rotten Tomatoes, 43% of 7 critics' reviews are positive, with an average rating of 5/10.

TV Guide wrote, "A talented supporting cast can't overcome a formulaic script that substitutes a fast pace for inspiration." The review continued, "The film starts well enough, with the scene of young Danny helping his father deliver a baby; but once Peters gets all of his quirky characters together, he doesn't seem to know what to do with them, simply bouncing them off each other for an hour or so until it's time to bring everything to its pre-ordained conclusion." In the Chicago Reader, Lisa Alspector wrote "the only funny thing [in the film] is the unintentional parody of the conventions of romantic comedy and wacky-family stories. During one climactic night so many hyperdramatic events occur that a kitchen sink might as well have been lobbed onto the set".

For The A.V. Club, Nathan Rabin said, "Law and Mol's characters don't seem to have anything in common, and they certainly don't have much chemistry, so Music From Another Room relies almost exclusively on the concept of fate to perpetuate the idea that there is something drawing the two together other than just the demands of the script and the genre. Law is an engaging actor, and Mol is both attractive and competent, but Music From Another Room adds up to little more than the sum of its contrivances."

The film was featured on the comedy podcast How Did This Get Made?
