= John Peaslee =

American producer and screenwriter (1951–2024)

- Born: John Robert Peaslee; June 21, 1951; New York City, New York, U.S.
- Died: November 11, 2024 (aged 73); Sherman Oaks, California, U.S.
- Education: Northwestern University
- Occupations: Television producer, screenwriter

John Robert Peaslee (June 21, 1951 – November 11, 2024) was an American television producer and screenwriter. He produced and wrote for television programs including Coach, 8 Simple Rules, Just Shoot Me!, Liv and Maddie, Something So Right, Mad About You and According to Jim.

At the 44th Writers Guild of America Awards, he was nominated for a Writers Guild of America Award for Television in the category Episodic Comedy for his work on the television program Coach. His nomination was shared with his writing partner Judd Pillot.

Peaslee died at his home in Sherman Oaks, California, on November 11, 2024, at the age of 73.
