= Michael Jantze =

American cartoonist

Michael Jantze is an American cartoonist and illustrator, best known as the author of the syndicated newspaper comic strip The Norm.

== Biography ==
Jantze attended Goshen College and California State University, Northridge, then worked as an art director, first in corporations and newspaper newsrooms and then at ILM, while developing his strip.

Jantze is the author of the syndicated newspaper comic strip The Norm. Norm has been described as like a grown-up Calvin from Calvin & Hobbes. Indeed, Jantze sought Calvin & Hobbes creator Bill Watterson's advice on his early work.

In addition to the comic strip, Jantze owned Jantze Studios, LLC, a studio focusing on character-based humorous entertainment for print and animation. His clients included Joe Murray Studios, Fox Sports, LXR Resorts and Hotels, Hearst Media, and YouTube.
