= According to Jim =

American sitcom (2001–2009)

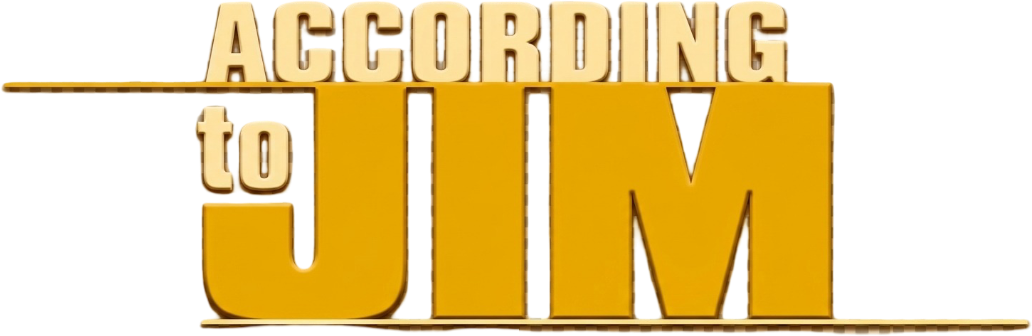
- Genre: Sitcom
- Created by: Tracy Newman; Jonathan Stark
- Showrunners: Tracy Newman (seasons 1–3); Jonathan Stark (seasons 1–4); Warren Bell (seasons 5–8)
- Starring: Jim Belushi; Courtney Thorne-Smith; Kimberly Williams-Paisley; Larry Joe Campbell; Taylor Atelian; Billi Bruno; Conner Rayburn
- Music by: Jonathan Wolff & Rich Ragsdale
- Opening theme: “Jimmie’s Theme” by Jim Belushi
- Country of origin: United States
- Original language: English
- No. of seasons: 8
- No. of episodes: 182 (list of episodes)

Production
- Executive producers: Tracy Newman; Jonathan Stark; Suzanne Bukinik; Marc Gurvitz; Jim Belushi; John D. Beck; Ron Hart; David Feeney; Warren Bell; Bob Nickman; Howard J. Morris; Nastaran Dibai; Jeffrey B. Hodes; John Peaslee; Judd Pillot
- Producers: Robert Heath; Harry Hannigan; Christopher J. Nowak
- Camera setup: Multi-camera
- Running time: 22 minutes
- Production companies: Newman-Stark Productions; Suzanne Bukinik Entertainment; Brad Grey Television; ABC Studios (Note: Credited as Touchstone Television for (seasons 1–6))

Original release
- Network: ABC
- Release: October 3, 2001 – June 2, 2009

According to Jim is an American sitcom television series starring Jim Belushi in the title role as a suburban father of three children (and then five children, starting with the seventh season finale). It originally aired on ABC from October 3, 2001, to June 2, 2009.

== Synopsis ==
The main cast of According to Jim (seasons 4–7).

Jim is a happy-go-lucky suburban father. Much like his real-life counterpart, Jim's character is a fan of blues music, as well as the Chicago Bears, Chicago Cubs, Chicago Bulls and Chicago Blackhawks. Together with his wife Cheryl, they have three children, daughters Ruby and Gracie and son Kyle. In the seventh season they become parents of twin boys Gordon and Jonathan.

Jim often finds himself in difficult situations, because his slacker sensibilities cause him to search for alternative ways to get things done with less effort. Jim is very cheap, selfish, rude and arrogant. Cheryl's brother Andy is Jim's best friend/brother-in-law and her sister Dana frequently teams up with Cheryl against Jim. He also prefers to lie to Cheryl and Dana to do his own activities but they end up backfiring on him. He hates losing to women, especially if Cheryl or Dana find out. He doesn't like people interrupting him when he talks, so he speaks over them to shut them up. Jim often makes an example of Andy, who for most of the series does not have a steady girlfriend. Dana and Jim argue constantly, but Dana flirts with Jim when she's drunk, discovering after one such event that she respects Jim as a loving father despite his flaws.

== Episodes ==
Season	Episodes	Originally released	
Season	Episodes	First released	Last released
1	22	October 3, 2001	May 15, 2002
2	28	October 1, 2002	May 20, 2003
3	29	September 23, 2003	May 25, 2004
4	27	September 21, 2004	May 27, 2005
5	22	September 20, 2005	May 2, 2006
6	18	January 3, 2007	May 16, 2007
7	18	January 1, 2008	May 27, 2008
8	18	December 2, 2008	June 2, 2009

== Cast and characters ==
=== Main and recurring cast ===
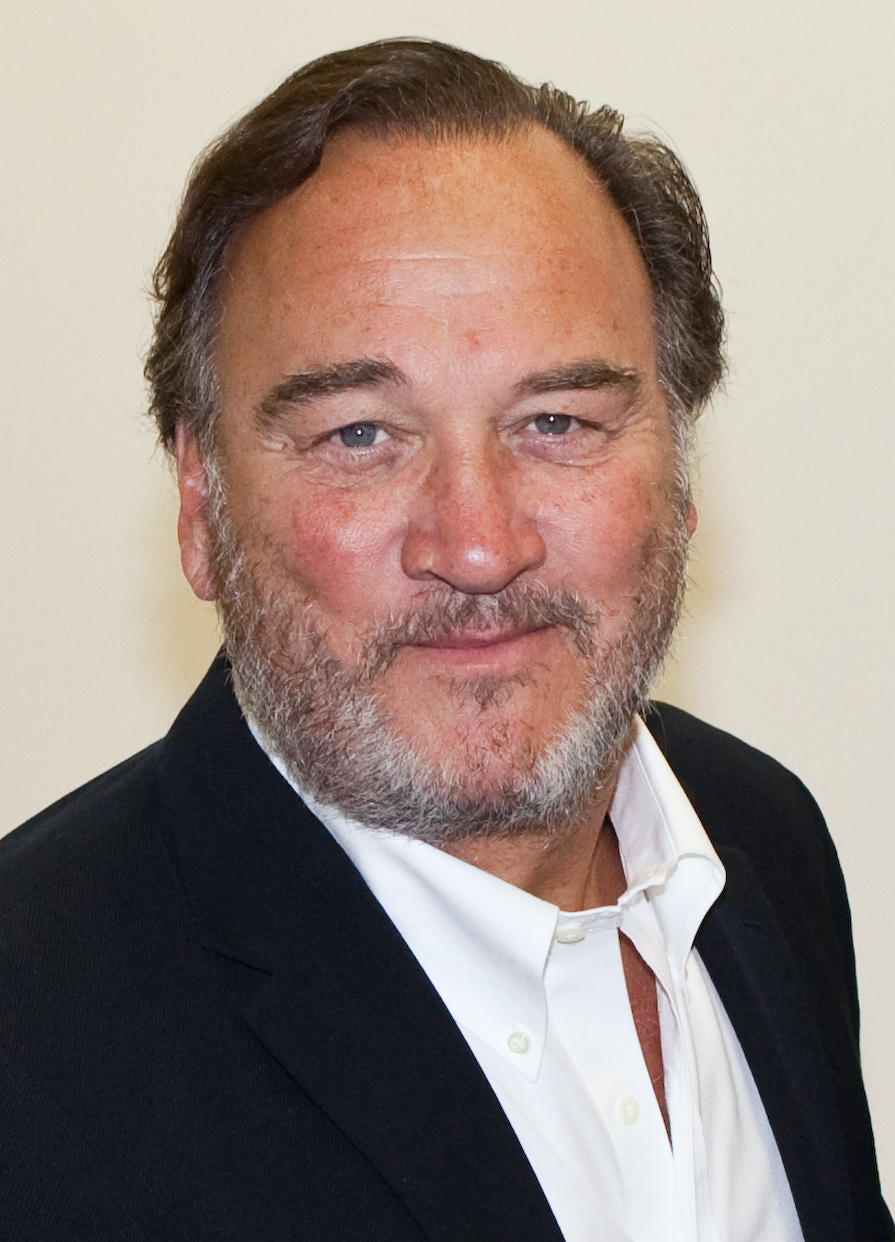
Jim Belushi as James "Jim"

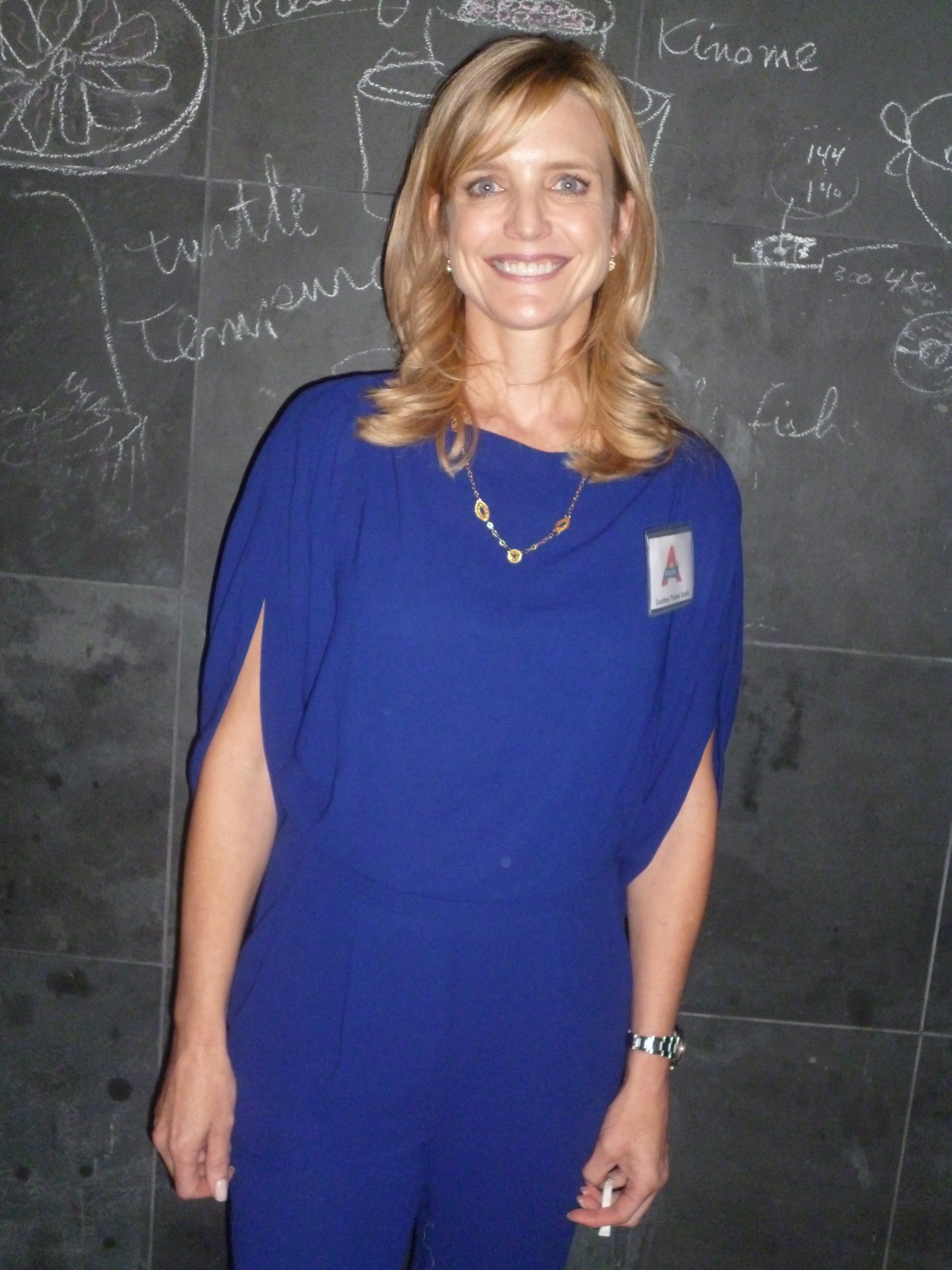
Courtney Thorne-Smith as Cheryl

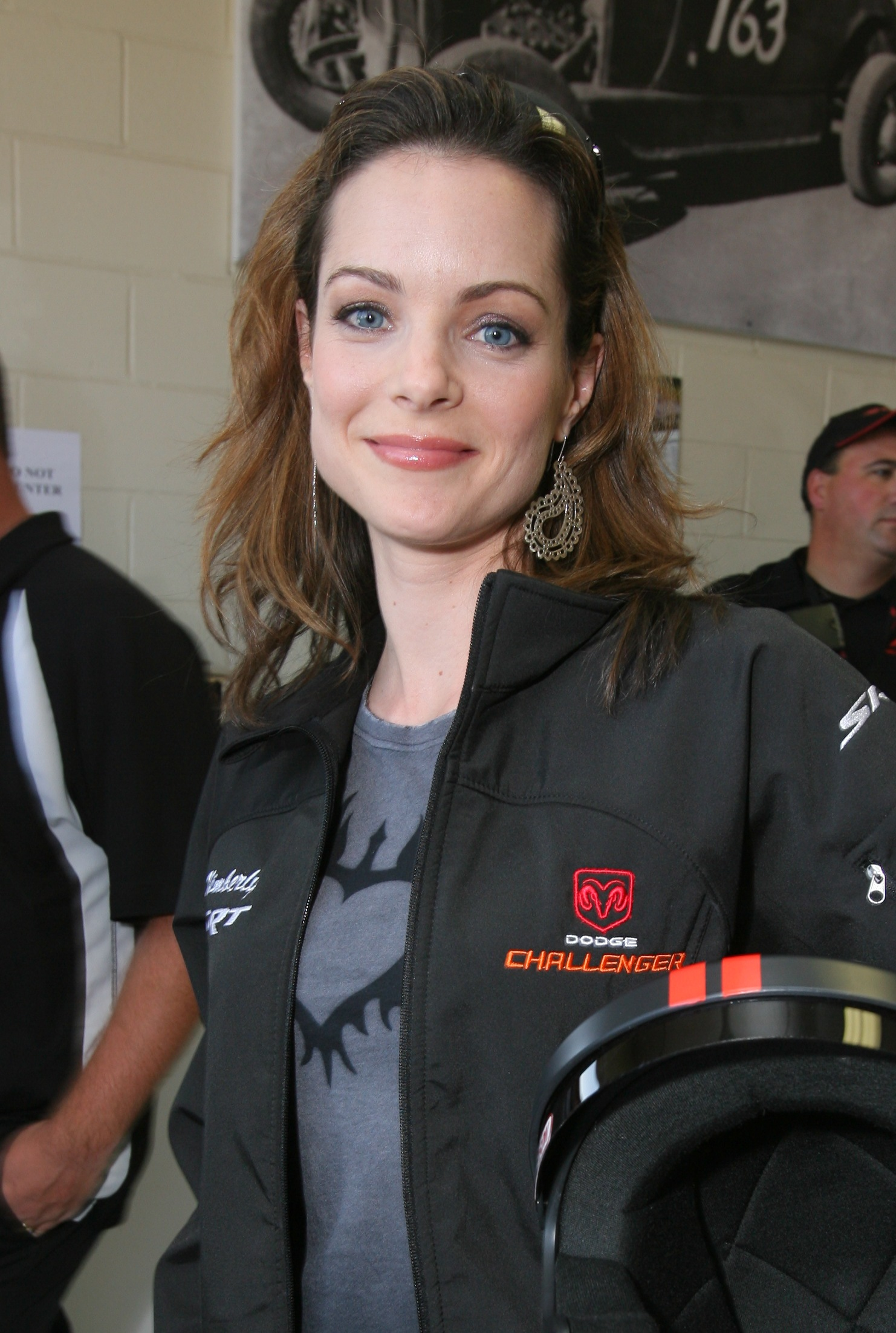
Kimberly Williams-Paisley as Dana

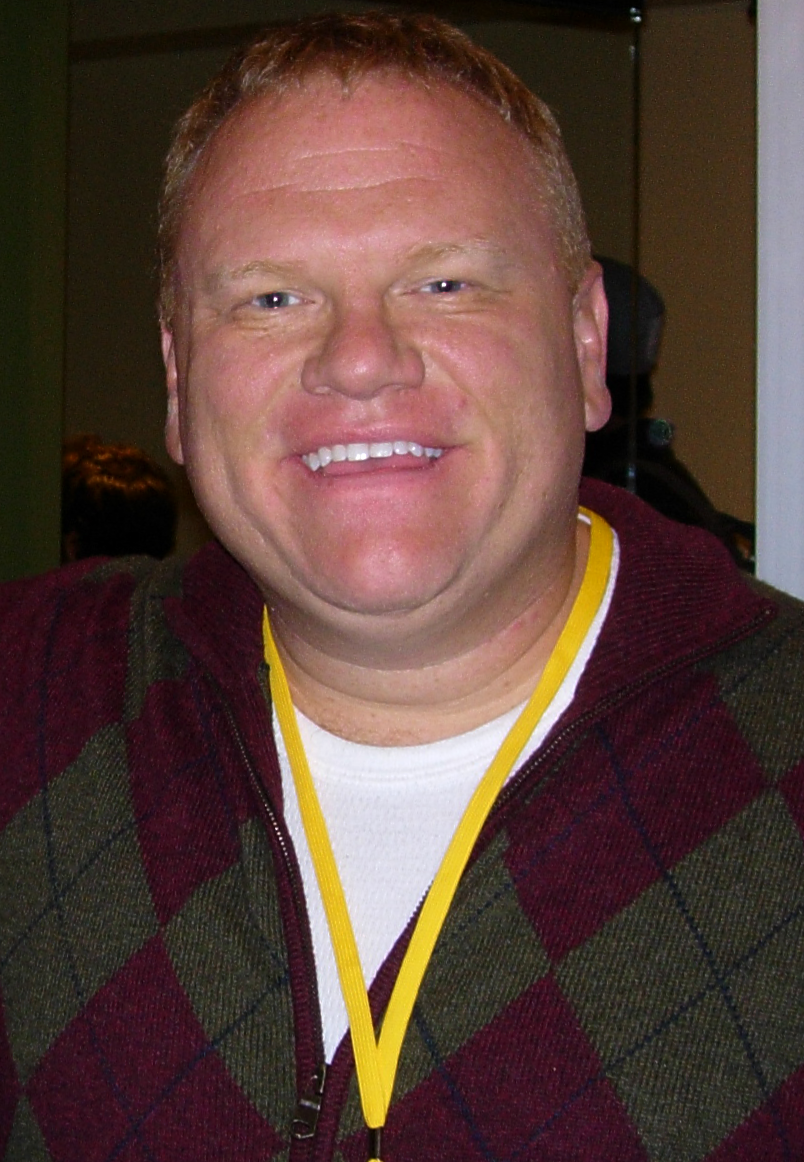
Larry Joe Campbell as Andrew "Andy"

Actor	Character	Seasons							
Actor	Character	1	2	3	4	5	6	7	8
Jim Belushi	James "Jim"	Main	Main	Main	Main	Main	Main	Main	Main
Courtney Thorne-Smith	Cheryl	Main	Main	Main	Main	Main	Main	Main	Main
Kimberly Williams-Paisley	Dana	Main	Main	Main	Main	Main	Main	Main	Special Guest (Note: Williams-Paisley makes her only season eight appearance and is credited as special guest in its finale.)
Larry Joe Campbell	Andrew "Andy"	Main	Main	Main	Main	Main	Main	Main	Main
Taylor Atelian	Ruby	Main	Main	Main	Main	Main	Main	Main	Main
Billi Bruno	Gracie	Main	Main	Main	Main	Main	Main	Main	Main
Conner Rayburn	Kyle				Main (Note: In the fourth season, Rayburn is initially credited as co-star in the closing credits before being promoted to the main cast in the seventh episode.)	Main	Main	Main	Main
Mitch Rouse	Ryan Gibson				Recurring (Note: Rouse is only credited as guest star in episodes he appears in.)	Recurring	Recurring		Guest (Note: Rouse makes his only season eight appearance and is credited as guest star in its finale.)

- Jim Belushi as James "Jim" (seasons 1–8): the titular role of the series. Jim is a suburban family man, successful construction business owner (Ground Up Design), and blues garage band frontman. In his stubborn ways, Jim gets himself into various predicaments, which compel him to solve in creative ways, all while battling his own conscience. Despite his best efforts, Jim ultimately admits his wrong-doings to Cheryl and others involved. Shenanigans aside, Jim is happily married to his loving wife, Cheryl. Jim and Cheryl's three children (Ruby, Gracie and Kyle) complement the family dynamic through the series' run. At the end of season 7, Cheryl gives birth to identical twin sons, Johnathan and Gordon. Jim is an avid Chicago sports enthusiast. In numerous episodes, Jim is seen watching Chicago Bears football games in his living room. In season 4's "Poking the Bear" episode, Jim shows his disdain for other football teams when his potential client takes him to a Green Bay Packers game. He enjoys playing harmonica and fronting his garage band. In various episodes, he and his band practice in the garage, except when Cheryl takes over the garage with a yoga class in season 2's "The Closet" episode, forcing Jim and the band to practice in the attic.
- Courtney Thorne-Smith as Cheryl (seasons 1–8): Jim's wife, as well as Dana and Andy's older sister. Last names were never revealed for Jim and Cheryl, only middle names, (Orenthal and Mable).
- Kimberly Williams-Paisley as Dana Gibson (seasons 1–7; special guest season 8): Cheryl's younger sister. Dana is a vice president for a marketing company and prides herself at being good at her job. She often sides with her sister, Cheryl, during family quarrels.
- Larry Joe Campbell as Andrew "Andy" (seasons 1–8): Cheryl's younger brother. Andy is a Stanford University graduate and works for Jim as an architect at their construction company, Ground Up Design. He often sides with Jim during family squabbles. He is a sci-fi enthusiast who collects video games, Nerf guns, DVD movies, board games, and comic books (as seen in season 6's "Separate Ways"). Andy considers himself to be a "ladies’ man", but his pick-up lines don't bring many long-term relationships.
- Taylor Atelian as Ruby (seasons 1–8): Jim and Cheryl's first child. Like her mother, Cheryl, Ruby is a leader amongst her siblings.
- Billi Bruno as Gracie (seasons 1–8): Jim and Cheryl's second child. Gracie often sides with Ruby during sibling rivalries against Kyle.
- Conner Rayburn as Kyle (seasons 4–8): Jim and Cheryl's third child. Kyle is not particularly interested in sports and finds it difficult to connect with his father on the topic. In some episodes where Jim imagines Kyle as an adult, he is played by Jim Belushi's real-life son Robert.
- Mitch Rouse as Dr. Ryan "Doc" Gibson (recurring seasons 4–6; guest season 8): Cheryl's doctor in season 4's "Poking the Bear" episode. Ryan later becomes Dana's boyfriend, the two eventually marry, and have a child together.

=== Other appearances ===
- Tony Braunagel as Tony (seasons 1–8): A member of Jim's band
- Connor and Garret Sullivan as baby Kyle (seasons 1–3)
- John Rubano as John (seasons 1–8): A member of Jim's band
- Charlie Hartsock as Charlie (seasons 3–8): A member of Jim's band
- Robert Belushi as Pizza boy / adult Kyle / Various (seasons 1–6, 8)
- Mark Beltzman as Beltzman (seasons 3–4, 6): A member of Jim's band
- Christopher Moniyhan as Chris (seasons 1–2): A member of Jim's band
- Jamison Belushi as Various (seasons 5–8)
- Dan Aykroyd as Danny Michalski (seasons 1–3, 8): Jim's long-time friend and police officer
- Kathleen Noone as Maggie (seasons 1–2, 4–5): Cheryl, Dana and Andy's mother
- Jackie Debatin as Mandy (season 8): Ruby's piano teacher. Later, Andy's girlfriend.
- Cynthia Stevenson as Cindy Devlin (seasons 2–4, 6): Cheryl's obnoxious soccer-mom friend
- Tim Bagley as Tim Devlin (seasons 2–4, 6): Cindy's husband
- Mo Collins as Emily (seasons 7–8): Andy's girlfriend
- Chris Elliott as Reverend Pierson (seasons 2–3)
- Brad Paisley as Eddie (season 2): Dana's boyfriend and Andy's replacement on keyboards for a gig. He also portrays Chad (season 2) in the episodes "You Gotta Love Somebody (Parts 1 & 2)".
- Laraine Newman as Officer Laraine Elkin (seasons 2–3): Danny's police officer partner
- Jennifer Coolidge as Roxanne (seasons 2–3): Jim's estranged sister
- Erik Estrada as Himself (season 5). He also portrays the Devil (season 8) in the episode "Heaven Opposed to Hell".
- Lee Majors as God (seasons 7–8)
- Nicole Sullivan as Alicia (season 1): Ruby's piano teacher and Andy's girlfriend
- Brian Urlacher as Himself (season 1)
- Cindy Crawford as Gretchen Saunders (season 2): A seductive female manager at a car dealership in "Cars & Chicks"
- Mike Ditka as Himself (season 2)
- Trista Sutter as Herself (season 2)
- Bo Diddley as Himself (season 2)
- Jack Coleman as Sean Curran (season 2)
- Wayne Newton as Himself (season 2)
- Jane Lynch as Janice (season 3): Jim and Cheryl's neighbor
- Tom Bergeron as Himself (season 3)
- James Earl Jones as the voice of Royal Flush (season 3): A stainless steel talking toilet
- Dave Coulier as the voice of Angry Pete (season 4): A psychotic turkey in "The Hunters"
- Tom Arnold as Max (season 4): A Green Bay Packers fan and Jim's potential client
- Hugh Hefner as Himself (season 5)
- Linda Hamilton as Melissa Evans (season 5): Jim's former girlfriend
- Barry Williams as Ben (season 5)
- Julie Newmar as Herself (season 5)
- Tim Meadows as Dennis (season 6)
- George Takei as Himself (season 6)
- Phil LaMarr as Kurt (season 6)
- Cole Sprouse as Himself (season 7)
- Dylan Sprouse as Himself (season 7)
- Steve Guttenberg as Himself (season 8)
- Rob Moran as Director (season 8)
- Constance Marie as Victoria (season 8): Jim's former girlfriend
- James Lipton as The Devil (season 7)

== Production ==
=== Development ===
According to Jim was created by Tracy Newman and Jonathan Stark. The sitcom was produced by ABC's in-house production company and Newman/Stark, Suzanne Bukinik Entertainment and Brad Grey Television. Filming occurred at the CBS Studio Center in Los Angeles. It was originally announced in May 2001 under the title The Dad, with the pilot being shot sometime in mid-2001. In July 2001, the show's title was changed from The Dad to According to Jim.

Belushi, besides playing Jim, directed 30 episodes and is credited as executive producer.

Belushi's fictional character Jim's band in the series is the real-life House of Blues band The Sacred Hearts, for which Jim Belushi often sings lead.

==== Influences ====
Belushi says he set the show's trademark tone back in the show's 2001 pilot.

"The original script called for Jim to go to the wife and apologize," he recalls. "I said to the writers, 'Why do we have to do a show where the guy is going to apologize at the end of every episode? Was he really wrong? He's contrite, sure. But isn't he just being a man?'"

In an interview, Jim Belushi explained that the show many times directly reflected his actual life. Quite a few episodes were experiences taken directly from Belushi's home. Most of the episodes were taken from experiences inside the writers' homes, too. He adds:

"Every show is based in somebody's reality. Whether it's [co-stars] Larry's, or mine, or Courtney's, or the writers'. Because it was a relationship show about a family, everyone would bring in their experiences as a family, and we would do shows around them."

==== Family names ====
Last names were never really addressed for the entire run of the show. None of the main characters did get a last name until Season 4 when Kimberly Williams-Paisley's character Dana married Dr. Ryan Gibson (played by Mitch Rouse). She became Dana Gibson with their marriage. Only guest characters had first and last names in most cases.

=== Music ===
The According to Jim soundtrack was recorded at Ultratone Studies in Studio City, California and released by Hollywood Records on November 1, 2005.

==== Track listing ====
All songs are performed by Jim Belushi and The Sacred Hearts.

No.	Title	Writer(s)	Original artist (date)	Length
1.	"Sweet Home Chicago"	Robert Johnson	Robert Johnson (1936)	3:28
2.	"Cadillac Man"	Jim Belushi, Glen Clark		2:36
3.	"Say I Do"	Belushi, Clark, Jana Hunter, Mitch Hunter		2:55
4.	"Have Love, Will Travel"	Richard Berry	Richard Berry (1959)	3:26
5.	"Three Hundred Pounds of Joy"	Willie Dixon	Howlin' Wolf (1963)	4:07
6.	"Jimmie's Theme"	Belushi, Clark		3:42
7.	"Angel"	Belushi, Clark		3:11
8.	"Mellow Down Easy"	Willie Dixon	Little Walter (1954)	3:12
9.	"Girl Watcher"	Ronald Killette, Wayne Pittman	The O'Kaysions (1968)	3:21
10.	"I've Got Everything I Need (Almost)"	Don Walsh	Downchild Blues Band (1973)	2:44
11.	"Bless My Soul"	Belushi, Clark		2:44
12.	"Mambo Miami"	Belushi, Clark		3:40
13.	"Viva Las Vegas"	Doc Pomus, Mort Shuman	Elvis Presley (1964)	3:53
14.	"All She Wants to Do Is Rock"	Teddy McRae, Wynonie Harris	Wynonie Harris (1949)	2:44
Total length:				45:43

== Release ==
=== Broadcast ===
The show first aired following the surprise hit comedy My Wife and Kids and quickly developed an audience of its own. For its second season ABC placed it on its revitalized Tuesday line-up, which also included John Ritter's 8 Simple Rules, Bonnie Hunt's Life with Bonnie and Sara Rue's Less than Perfect. Week by week, the show attracted more and more viewers, becoming ABC's second most watched sitcom. The show performed so well that the network made a risky move: putting Jim opposite the NBC juggernaut Frasier. Although Jim did not beat the competition, it performed well enough to secure itself that spot on the 2003 fall schedule.

On May 15, 2007, ABC announced that According to Jim would not be renewed for another season. ABC Entertainment President Stephen McPherson said, "We are talking to the studio to see if there's something financially, a deal that would make sense for us." But on June 27, 2007, ABC renewed the show for a seventh season with 18 episodes.

According to Jim returned to ABC's schedule on Tuesday, January 1, 2008, with two episodes at 9 pm and 9:30 pm. After that, the series moved to its regular time slot at 8 pm. Despite the writer's strike, ABC announced that the show would produce all 18 episodes ordered for this season.

On February 27, 2008, it was reported that ABC was close to renewing According to Jim for an eighth season. On May 13, 2008, ABC officially renewed the series and Season 8 began airing on December 2, 2008. Kimberly Williams-Paisley left the show's regular cast at the beginning of Season 8 and was not in the Season 8 opening credits, to devote her time to motherhood. She made a guest appearance only in the season finale.

In December 2008, co-star Larry Joe Campbell said that the sets had been destroyed, indicating that the series was canceled, but that a series finale had been recorded. After the first six episodes of Season 8 all aired in December, According to Jim returned to ABC's schedule on April 14, 2009, for the final 12 episodes. The series finale of According to Jim aired on June 2, 2009, on ABC, and was titled "Heaven Opposed to Hell."

=== Home media ===
Lionsgate Home Entertainment (under license from ABC Studios) has released the first five seasons on DVD in Region 1.

DVD name	Ep#	Release date
The Complete First Season	22	October 21, 2008
The Complete Second Season	28	May 4, 2010
The Complete Third Season	29	May 3, 2011
The Complete Fourth Season	27	July 5, 2011
The Complete Fifth Season	22	October 4, 2011
The Complete Sixth Season	18	TBA
The Complete Seventh Season	18	TBA
The Complete Eighth and Final Season	18	TBA

== Reception ==
The pilot was screened to critics in the month leading up to its premiere, and received a mixed response. In his September 9, 2001 review of the pilot, SFGate's John Carmen labelled the show a "formulaic comedy", and said the only distinguishable part of the pilot was when Jim's four year old daughter Gracie loudly proclaimed "I have a vagina" during a kitchen scene. In her September 28, 2001 review of the pilot, Laura Fries of Variety said that the show "works better when it stays within the family unit, where Belushi is key", adding that he "reps the definition of a lovable lug". On October 2, 2001, Caryn James of The New York Times called it "among the season's worst new shows", and criticized it as "[grabbing] every stereotype in its reach". Regarding Belushi's character, she also said "somehow Jim Belushi has made a career out of playing lovable lunks, even though no one finds his lunky characters lovable."

=== Ratings ===
The sitcom debuted in October 2001 on ABC with an average of 10 million viewers for its first year. The audience grew in the second year to over 10.3 million. The ratings remained consistent for Seasons 3 and 4 as well. Starting with Season 5, the ratings began to decline. The series was often scheduled against the hugely successful American Idol. By Season 6, According to Jim was down to 6.7 million viewers.

Seasonal rankings (based on average total viewers per episode) of According to Jim on ABC.

Note: Each U.S. network television season starts in late September and ends in late May, which coincides with the completion of May sweeps.

Season	Timeslot	Premiere	Finale	TV season	Ranking	Viewers (in millions)
1st	Wednesday 8:30 p.m.	October 3, 2001	May 15, 2002	2001–2002	#55	10.0
2nd	Tuesday 8:30 p.m.	October 1, 2002	May 20, 2003	2002–2003	#51	10.3
3rd	Tuesday 9:00 p.m.	September 23, 2003	May 25, 2004	2003–2004	#51	9.9
4th	Tuesday 9:00 p.m.	September 21, 2004	May 17, 2005	2004–2005	#47	9.9
5th	Tuesday 8:00 p.m.	September 20, 2005	May 2, 2006	2005–2006	#108	6.7
6th	Wednesday 9:00 p.m.	January 3, 2007	May 16, 2007	2006–2007	#119	6.7
7th	Tuesday 9:00 p.m.	January 1, 2008	March 11, 2008	2007–2008	#146	5.3
7th	Tuesday 8:30 p.m.	April 15, 2008	May 27, 2008	2007–2008	#171	4.1
8th	Tuesday 9:00 p.m.	December 2, 2008	December 30, 2008	2008–2009	#104	5.6
8th	Tuesday 9:30 p.m.	December 2, 2008	December 30, 2008	2008–2009	#127	4.8
8th	Tuesday 8:00 p.m.	April 14, 2009	June 2, 2009	2008–2009	#148	3.8
8th	Tuesday 8:30 p.m.	April 14, 2009	June 2, 2009	2008–2009	#149	3.8

=== Accolades ===
According to Jim was nominated for 20 awards, including four Primetime Emmy Awards (all for cinematography).

Association	Year (Note: Indicates the year of ceremony. Each year is linked to the article about the awards held that year, wherever possible.)	Category	Nominee(s) / Work	Result	Ref(s)
NAACP Image Awards	2007	Outstanding Directing in a Comedy Series	Lauren Breiting (for "The Stick")	Nominated	
Primetime Emmy Awards	2006	Outstanding Cinematography for a Multi-Camera Series	George Mooradian (for "Mr. Right")	Nominated	
Primetime Emmy Awards	2007	Outstanding Cinematography for a Multi-Camera Series	George Mooradian (for "Hoosier Daddy")	Nominated	
Primetime Emmy Awards	2008	Outstanding Cinematography for a Half-Hour Series	George Mooradian (for "The Chaperone")	Nominated	
Primetime Emmy Awards	2009	Outstanding Cinematography for a Half-Hour Series	George Mooradian (for "Heaven Opposed to Hell")	Nominated	
Young Artist Awards	2002	Best Performance in a TV Series (Comedy or Drama) – Young Actress Age Ten or Under	Taylor Atelian	Nominated	
Young Artist Awards	2002	Best Performance in a TV Series (Comedy or Drama) – Young Actress Age Ten or Under	Billi Bruno	Nominated	
Young Artist Awards	2003	Best Performance in a TV Series (Comedy or Drama) – Young Actress Age Ten or Younger	Taylor Atelian	Nominated	
Young Artist Awards	2004	Best Performance in a TV Series (Comedy or Drama) – Young Actress Age Ten or Younger	Taylor Atelian	Nominated	
Young Artist Awards	2004	Best Performance in a TV Series (Comedy or Drama) – Young Actress Age Ten or Younger	Billi Bruno	Nominated	
Young Artist Awards	2005	Best Performance in a TV Series (Comedy or Drama) – Young Actress Age Ten or Younger	Taylor Atelian	Nominated	
Young Artist Awards	2005	Best Performance in a TV Series (Comedy or Drama) – Young Actress Age Ten or Younger	Billi Bruno	Nominated	
Young Artist Awards	2006	Best Performance in a TV Series (Comedy or Drama) – Young Actor Age Ten or Younger	Connor and Garret Sullivan	Nominated	
Young Artist Awards	2006	Best Performance in a TV Series (Comedy or Drama) – Young Actress Ten or Younger	Taylor Atelian	Nominated	
Young Artist Awards	2006	Best Performance in a TV Series (Comedy or Drama) – Young Actress Ten or Younger	Billi Bruno	Nominated	
Young Artist Awards	2006	Best Family Television Series (Comedy)	According to Jim	Nominated	
Young Artist Awards	2007	Best Performance in a TV Series – Young Actress Age Ten or Younger	Billi Bruno	Nominated	
Young Artist Awards	2007	Best Performance in a TV Series – Guest Starring Young Actor	Austin Majors	Nominated	
Young Artist Awards	2008	Best Performance in a TV Series – Young Actor Ten or Under	Conner Rayburn	Nominated	
Young Artist Awards	2008	Best Performance in a TV Series – Supporting Young Actress	Taylor Atelian	Nominated	
