= The Norm (comic strip) =

Comic strip by Michael Jantze

Michael Jantze's The Norm

The Norm is an American comic strip by Michael Jantze. Running in newspapers syndicated by King Features Syndicate from August 1996 until September 12, 2004, the strip documents the everyday happenings and frequent personal commentaries of its titular protagonist, Theodore Norman Miller. Following the last printed strip in 2004, Jantze began to develop The Norm as an online comic strip and television series. "The Norm 4.0" rebooted in January 2015 and appears every Monday at GoComics. A book collection of the earlier color Sunday work is in print in English and other books and magazines are available in English, Swedish and Spanish by resellers on the internet.

== Characters and story ==
Theodore Norman Miller: The titular character and protagonist, who, with very few exceptions, is always referred to as "Norm". The title The Norm implies that he is a typical everyman. In one strip he states that "Actually my full name is 'Theodore Norman', but I use the first 3 and 4 letters because 3 plus 4 is seven and that's my lucky number." It was later revealed that his full name is actually Theodore Norman Miller. Norm is a graphic designer who is "twenty-something" and single, taking a casual approach to life. While he is not very socially adept, most people find him likable. His relaxed attitude and impulsiveness are the main source of interpersonal conflict within the strip. While an avid reader, Norm also has a fascination for new technology and gadgets. He is also a Star Wars fan with a complete collection of action figures. A recurring theme throughout the strip involves Norm often breaking the fourth wall and speaking directly to the reader.

Boy Norm: A younger version of Norm that Norm reverts to at times when he is acting immature or feels like he is being treated as a child. Boy Norm particularly loves video games and lives on a diet of breakfast cereal. Boy Norm also acts as a sort of conscience for Norm, appearing to him and talking to him as another character. The advice he gives usually leads Norm toward making impulsive decisions. Boy Norm is not malicious or unkind; he is just a kid, Norm's inner child, who Norm lets out to play all too often.

Reine Miller (née Stark): Norm's best friend who he has known since college. She is a highly successful businesswoman whose over-focused driven tendencies counterpoint Norm's relaxed attitude. Though they have known each other a long time they were happy to just be friends; however, everyone who knew them thought they would make a good couple. Later, to please her parents Reine lied and said that she and Norm were engaged. This led to a convoluted trip to Hawaii with Reine's parents, in which Norm and Reine realized their true feelings for each other. Soon after they began dating and eventually marry.

Ford duBois: Norm's closest male friend, who is slightly older and slightly wiser than Norm; he is African-American and occasionally acts as his voice of reason; though more often than not he encourages and goes along with Norm's whimsical tendencies. At work he is a technical writer who works in the cubicle next to Norm's and is often seen Gophering or peering over the partition like Kilroy. In an extended story arc, Ford becomes engaged to his girlfriend Jan, and then while in the process of making their wedding plans they abruptly decide to move to another state. After an extended absence of nearly two years interrupted only briefly, Ford returned to the strip once again as a recurring character, now divorced from Jan and with an appearance significantly changed.

Jan: Ford's girlfriend (later wife and subsequently ex-wife) is a therapist who does not like Norm, but is good friends with Reine. Though Ford is fully committed to their relationship, he resorts to creative ways to evade her so he can hang out with Norm; such as offering to help with their wedding plans, which invariably gets him thrown out of the house. Later on, it is revealed that Jan engaged in an extramarital affair while married to Ford, which led to him divorcing her.

Mom and Dad: Norm's unnamed parents, who are usually depicted as voices out of the cartoon frame. In some strips they are drawn as childish stick-figure sketches, reflecting the fact that Norm still sees them through a child's eyes. While Norm frequently talks about wanting to be "friends" with his parent on an equal adult level, he invariably ends up being treated as a kid, often reverting to "Boy Norm" in the process. In later strips, they are drawn as normal characters, but always with their faces obscured.

Reine's Parents: Ben and Ruth Stark serve as Reine's loving but often quirky and overbearing parents; unlike Norm's parents, they appear regularly in the strip and interact with other characters normally. They are a happy older couple who are quite fond of their daughter, and are quite approving of Norm as well in no small part because they are under the false understanding that Norm and Reine are dating. Ben is an avid golfer who will stop at nothing to get a round of 18 in, while Ruth is a frequently-overbearing mother who constantly obsesses about becoming a grandmother, especially after Norm and Reine marry. They have at least one other child, a son who is only referred to by name throughout the strip.

The Co-workers: Most of Norm's co-workers have no given names and are known only by their job titles, such as the President (also referred to as the CEO), the HR Director, the System Technicians (there are two), the Copier Repairman, etc.

The Boss: (No name given) An African-American woman who is Norm's manager at work. A low-level cog in the company's management who is constantly loading Norm down with work, meetings and deadlines that invariably make him work all sorts of overtime hours. An incessant consumer, she is frequently depicted throughout the strip as having an addiction to online shopping, an activity which gets her fired later on in the strip.

Wonk: Norm's older and balding co-worker. A plain vanilla type of guy who is constantly annoyed by Norm. The feeling is mutual. He becomes Norm's boss later in the strip after the previous one was fired.

Maria Elena: A friend of Reine who Norm had shown some interest in while unaware that she was already engaged. A recurring theme throughout the strip's later runs shows Maria attempting to move on from her fiancé leaving her, which invariably ends in her suffering an emotional breakdown.

The Neighbors: Also referred to as "The Married Friends", are a young married couple with a baby who lives next door to Norm, usually appearing as a counterpoint to Norm's bachelor lifestyle. Their names are not mentioned. They also have a Sheltie named Chuck that Norm occasionally takes for walks.

Chuck: The Shetland Sheepdog owned by Norm's neighbors. Norm likes to take Chuck for walks in the park as (according to his theory) it is a good way to meet single women. As a "Chick Magnet" Chuck is quite effective, but not always in a way that Norm appreciates.

Boomer: Norm's next door neighbor, and Wonk's twin brother. He is constantly borrowing things from Norm (usually without asking) and often appears in his yard in his bathrobe. Boomer is always outgoingly friendly but somewhat repulsive and Norm tries to avoid him whenever possible. Since Boomer moved into neighborhood the housing values have dropped considerably.

The XGF's: The Ex-Girlfriends, a collective term for all the women who Norm has dated in the past and broken up with. Usually the breakups are due to his own foibles. These ladies frequently come back to haunt him, sometimes even as a group. They include Marta, Greta, Rita (the "Über-ex-GF") and also Maria Elena who Norm never dated but was once interested in. Reine was also technically a member long before she and Norm began dating, since he had thought about it but never asked her since he did not want to lose her as a friend.

Bronte: A woman who saves Norm's life when he almost drowns on a hiking trip and later becomes his girlfriend. This relationship is complicated by the fact that they live in different states, and they can only spend limited amounts of time together. However, Norm actually sees this as an advantage. They break up while waiting in line at the theatre to see a Star Wars movie, when she confuses Star Wars with Star Trek.

Chris: Chris is a Star Wars fan who first met Norm in line to see a Star Wars movie, and eventually filled in Norm's best friend role after Ford's departure. Chris was wearing a Wookie costume at the time, and unfortunately for him, the zipper on the outfit got stuck, so he was trapped wearing it for a long time afterward. Norm got used to seeing his friend in the costume that he did not recognize Chris when he finally got out of it. Later, Chris became one of Norm's co-workers when he was hired as an accountant.
