= Boo =

Boo or BOO may refer to:

== Places ==
- Boo (Aller), parish in Asturias, Spain
- Boo, standard abbreviation for the constellation Boötes
- Boo, Ghana, a town in Lawra District in the Upper West RegionDeja
- Boo, Guinea, in Nzérékoré Prefecture; see List of schools in Ghana
- Boo, Sweden, locality in Stockholm County
- Bodø Airport in Norway, IATA airport code BOO
- Boo Islands, West Papua, Indonesia

=== Station ===
- Code for Bogor railway station

== People ==
- Boo (name), a list of people with the given name, nickname or surname
- Betty Boo (born 1970), English singer, songwriter and pop rapper Alison Moira Clarkson
- Gangsta Boo (1979–2023), American rapper
- Sabrian "Boo" Sledge, half of the American hip hop duo Boo & Gotti
- Ben Okello Oluoch, Kenyan politician and host of the radio program Kogwen gi BOO

== Arts, entertainment, and media ==
=== Fictional characters ===
- Boo (Mario franchise), a ghost character in the Mario franchise
- Boo, a hamster belonging to Minsc in Baldur's Gate, and a character in Megatokyo
- Boo, a character in the Malaysian animated television series Boo & Me
- Boo, a character in the manga and anime Crayon Shin-chan
- Boo, a little human toddler girl in the 2001 Pixar film Monsters, Inc.
- Boo, Carrie Black's nickname in Orange Is the New Black
- Boo! (comic strip), a character in the British comic The Dandy created by Andy Fanton
- Majin Boo, an anime and manga character in Dragon Ball
- Boo Radley, a character in the novel To Kill a Mockingbird and its adaptations
- Boo, the title character in Boo! (TV series)
- Boo, a pet robot quadruped creature in Remy & Boo
- Boo, a ghost of a cat in The Funky Phantom
- Boo, a character in the Cut the Rope series

=== Films ===
- Boo (2005 film), a horror film
- B.O.O.: Bureau of Otherworldly Operations, an animated film
- Boo! (1932 film), a 1932 comedy film
- Boo! (2018 film), a 2018 horror film
- Boo (2023 film), an Indian Telugu language horror film
- Boo! A Madea Halloween, a 2016 horror comedy film
  - Boo 2! A Madea Halloween, a 2017 horror comedy film

=== Music ===
- Boo! (album), by Was (Not Was)
- Boo! (band), a South African band
- Born of Osiris, an American heavy metal band
- "Boo" (song), by H3adband
- "Boo", by Moloko from Do You Like My Tight Sweater?

=== Television ===
- Boo! (TV series), a 2003–2006 British children's series
- "Boo" (CSI: NY), a 2007 episode
- "Boo" (Dark Angel), a 2001 episode
- "Boo!" (Frasier), a 2004 episode
- "Boo!" (Roseanne), a 1989 episode
- "Boo!" (Space Ghost Coast to Coast), an episode of Space Ghost Coast to Coast
- "Boo", a season 4 episode of Servant (TV series)
- "Boo!", a series 2 episode of Pocoyo

=== Literature ===
- The Boo (book), by Pat Conroy

== Computing and technology ==
- Boo (programming language)
- .boo (top-level domain), a top-level domain owned by Google
- .boo (file extension), a binary-to-text encoding system

== Languages ==
- Boo dialect, of the Teke-Ebo or Central Teke language, spoken in Congo and the Democratic Republic of the Congo
- Boko language (Benin), also called Boo language
- Bomu language, also called Boo, or Western Bobo Wule language
- Bozo language, ISO 639 code boo, spoken in Mali

== Other uses ==
- Better Off Out, a political campaign
- Black Oxygen Organics, a defunct multi-level marketing company
- Bladder outlet obstruction
- Boo (dog) (2006–2019)
- Boô, a Saxon cattle shed
- "Boo", a term of endearment
- Boo FF, a Swedish football club in Boo, Stockholm
- Boo.com, a clothing company
- Build Own Operate, a form of infrastructure project operating concession
- Booing, an insult

== See also ==
- Big Boo (disambiguation)
- BO2 (disambiguation)
- Boo Boo (disambiguation)
- Boo language (disambiguation)
- Boos (disambiguation)
- Buu (disambiguation)
