= List of Roseanne episodes =

Episodes of American TV sitcom

Roseanne is an American television sitcom created by Matt Williams that originally aired on ABC from October 18, 1988, to May 20, 1997, with a revival season that premiered in 2018. Lauded for its realistic portrayal of the average American family, the series stars Roseanne Barr, and revolves around the Conners, an Illinois working-class family. In the ninth season, Roseanne and her family win the lottery and associate with "high society".

On May 16, 2017, it was announced ABC would produce a tenth season revival of the series, set to air as a mid-season replacement in 2018, with the original cast returning. The tenth season debuted on March 27, 2018.

On March 30, 2018, the series was renewed for an eleventh season of 13 episodes by ABC. However, ABC reversed its decision and canceled the series on May 29, 2018, when Barr was fired from the show after she posted a controversial tweet about former Obama-administration Senior Advisor Valerie Jarrett. As of May 22, 2018, 231 episodes of Roseanne have aired, concluding the tenth season.

On June 21, 2018, the show was revived as a spin-off entitled The Conners, which has the same cast as Roseanne after her character dies of an opioid overdose. The show premiered on October 16, 2018, and aired all of its episodes on ABC, with the final episode airing on April 23, 2025.

== Series overview ==
Seasons of Roseanne
Season	Episodes	Originally released		Rank	Rating	Viewers (millions)
Season	Episodes	First released	Last released	Rank	Rating	Viewers (millions)
1	23	October 18, 1988	May 2, 1989	2	23.8	37.3
2	24	September 12, 1989	May 8, 1990	1	23.4	36.9
3	25	September 18, 1990	May 14, 1991	3	18.1	28.0
4	25	September 17, 1991	May 12, 1992	2	19.9	33.0
5	25	September 15, 1992	May 18, 1993	2	20.7	32.5
6	25	September 14, 1993	May 24, 1994	4	19.1	29.9
7	26	September 21, 1994	May 24, 1995	9	15.5	23.4
8	25	September 19, 1995	May 21, 1996	16	12.5	18.8
9	24	September 17, 1996	May 20, 1997	35	10.1	16.2
10	9	March 27, 2018	May 22, 2018	3	10.2	19.95 (Note: Includes DVR viewers.)

== Episodes ==
=== Season 1 (1988–89) ===
Roseanne, season 1 episodes
No. overall	No. in season	Title	Directed by	Written by	Original release date	Prod. code	US viewers (millions)
1	1	"Life and Stuff"	Ellen Falcon	Matt Williams	October 18, 1988	101	36.2
Roseanne is summoned to Darlene's school for a parent/teacher conference because she's been barking in history class. Stressed from the pressures of coping with home and work, she lashes out at Dan for not doing his share. Note: This episode is the only one in which Sal Barone played D.J. Conner. He was subsequently replaced by Michael Fishman.
2	2	"We're in the Money"	Ellen Falcon	David McFadzean	October 25, 1988	201	31.1
Although Dan and Roseanne agree not to spend any of Dan's $500 advance payment on themselves, neither can resist the temptation. Note: This is Michael Fishman's first appearance as D.J.
3	3	"D-I-V-O-R-C-E"	Ellen Falcon	Lauren Eve Anderson	November 1, 1988	205	36.9
Date night for Dan and Roseanne turns into a brush with divorce after they run into a newly single friend. Dan puts their relationship under a microscope, and after a lot of "what ifs," he and Roseanne conclude their relationship is meant to last. Meanwhile, Roseanne's sister, Jackie, arrives to babysit the kids, during which they lock her out of the house. Jackie gets her revenge though by sneaking back inside and scaring the kids.
4	4	"Language Lessons"	Ellen Falcon	Laurie Gelman	November 22, 1988	208	30.7
Dan and Roseanne take a body language test that will prove whether they can physically communicate their thoughts. The plan backfires when Dan's true feelings about Jackie are laid bare: he thinks Jackie is a meddlesome moocher, especially after she inadvertently comments about his lack of work, inciting a confrontation between the in-laws.
5	5	"Radio Days"	Ellen Falcon	Laurie Gelman	November 29, 1988	206	32.2
As Becky and Darlene bicker over bedroom territory, Roseanne encourages Dan to enter a songwriting contest (using one of her own poems as the lyrics) in hopes of winning a $100 prize (the episode features a full-length rendition sung by John Goodman). Meanwhile, sexual tension between Jackie and Wellman foreman Booker Brooks heats up.
6	6	"Lovers' Lane"	Ellen Falcon	Danny Jacobson	December 6, 1988	209	34.8
On a night out at the bowling alley, Roseanne sneaks a peek at Chip, Becky's first crush, who works there. Meanwhile, Booker makes a bet with Jackie for very high stakes: if he wins, she has to spend the night with him. He does so but refuses to spend the night with her because of a bet.
7	7	"The Memory Game"	Ellen Falcon	Grace McKeaney	December 13, 1988	202	36.2
Dan's enthusiastic plan to have a family portrait taken for his and Roseanne's 15th high school reunion yearbook exposes a 15-year-old secret he has kept from Roseanne: during a brief breakup back in high school, Dan had a one-night stand with Roseanne's nemesis, Phyllis Zimmer (who appears in the Season 6 episode "Guilt by Imagination").
8	8	"Here's to Good Friends"	Ellen Falcon	Danny Jacobson	December 20, 1988	207	35.4
Roseanne and Jackie console a brokenhearted Crystal after her boyfriend dumps her. A night at the Lobo Lounge, reflecting on love and men, helped to set her right. While at the Lobo, a miffed Jackie embarrasses Booker when he unexpectedly shows up with another woman after telling her he was spending the evening with his mother.
9	9	"Dan's Birthday Bash"	Ellen Falcon	Grace McKeaney	January 3, 1989	210	38.0
Roseanne and the kids surprise Dan with an elaborate birthday breakfast. Later that evening, Roseanne throws Dan a party at the Lobo. During the celebration, Dan barely avoids a fight with a loudmouthed jerk (Eric Allan Kramer) after Roseanne stops him. Afraid of looking like a wimp, Dan vows to beat up the bully the next time he sees him. When Dan and Roseanne run into the bully again and are harassed, Dan knocks him out cold. Meanwhile, Becky is invited to her boyfriend Chip's house for dinner.
10	10	"Saturday"	Ellen Falcon	David McFadzean	January 10, 1989	204	36.1
Dan intends to spend Saturday afternoon working on (translation: drinking beer and talking in front of) an old truck with his friends. Roseanne, having heard similar claims before, bets Dan that the guys will not finish the repair work by the end of the day. Dan takes the bet but soon realizes he is losing. When Jackie rebuffs Dwight, one of Dan's buddies, he makes a move on Crystal.
11	11	"Canoga Time"	Ellen Falcon	David McFadzean	January 17, 1989	212	36.8
Roseanne proposes a compromise when Dan is unable to bear parting with his old "junk" that Roseanne wants to donate to a rummage sale. Darlene forges a passing history grade on her report card.
12	12	"The Monday Thru Friday Show"	Ellen Falcon	Danny Jacobson	January 24, 1989	213	39.1
Dan and Roseanne disagree about where to spend their romantic 15th wedding anniversary with Roseanne envisioning a sunny Florida beach while Dan wants to fish at a rustic lodge. Becky is willing to accept a lower grade after refusing to dissect a frog in biology class. Darlene finds that a paper route is more work than she can handle and eventually gets fired. Jackie solves Dan and Roseanne's anniversary dilemma by taking the kids for the weekend, giving Dan and Roseanne some much-needed alone time at home.
13	13	"Bridge over Troubled Sonny"	Ellen Falcon	Laurie Gelman	January 31, 1989	211	38.3
Crystal struggles to cope with her first husband Sonny's death after Jackie, in a rush to get them to work on time, drives them over the bridge that Sonny was accidentally buried inside during its construction. Roseanne is unsure whether to tell Crystal about Sonny's infidelities to help her get over him. Crystal finally confronts her emotions and reveals that she knew about Sonny's cheating and had her own affair to spite him. Darlene decides it is cool to smoke until Roseanne finds her pack of cigarettes.
14	14	"Father's Day"	Ellen Falcon	Lauren Eve Anderson	February 7, 1989	214	38.9
Roseanne acts as a referee when Dan's father, Ed, visits the family bearing gifts. Everyone is thrilled to see him except Dan, who says Ed was an often-absent father and considers his philosophy of "work smart, not hard" as veiled criticism for his being a contractor, while Ed considers it caring, fatherly advice. Note: This episode marks the first appearance of Ned Beatty as Ed Conner, Dan's father.
15	15	"Nightmare on Oak Street"	John Pasquin	Grace McKeaney	February 14, 1989	215	34.6
After Dan lets the girls watch a slasher movie, Darlene has trouble sleeping. Roseanne blames the film, but the truth is something more natural: Darlene has had her first period. Roseanne sits her tomboyish daughter down for a heart-to-heart talk about becoming a woman.
16	16	"Mall Story"	John Sgueglia	Laurie Gelman	February 21, 1989	216	39.6
At the annual Lanford Mall-A-Thon, Roseanne and her brood scout out deals in retail heaven. Roseanne makes Dan buy a new pair of dress shoes he does not want. Becky finds the perfect dress for the high school dance that Roseanne says is too expensive. Roseanne later asks Dan to return the shoes so she can afford to buy Becky's dress.
17	17	"Becky's Choice"	John Sgueglia	Laurie Gelman and Danny Jacobson	February 28, 1989	218	39.9
Becky seems unenthused when Roseanne and Dan invite Becky's boyfriend Chip and his affluent parents over for dinner. During the evening, Roseanne catches Becky in the backyard, making out with Johnny Swanko, aka "The Tongue Bandit." Becky must now decide between Chip and Johnny.
18	18	"The Slice of Life"	John Sgueglia	Lauren Eve Anderson and David McFadzean	March 7, 1989	217	44.3
Becky prepares for a slumber party, and Darlene practices to pitch in a baseball game. Darlene becomes extremely moody and storms out of the house after arguing with Roseanne over. Later, Roseanne receives a phone call that Darlene was rushed to the hospital for an emergency appendectomy. Roseanne is wracked with guilt after Darlene develops complications; Roseanne and Dan anxiously await the doctor's prognosis, though all turns out well. Lynne Thigpen guest stars as Darlene's surgeon, Dr. Bryce.
19	19	"Workin' Overtime"	Ellen Falcon	Bill Pentland	March 14, 1989	203	41.2
The Wellman employees are exhausted after Booker continues to lengthen work shifts due to upped quotas and machinery errors. Roseanne is unable to handle the pressure, especially when Dan starts working overtime as well. After one too many long days, she takes a breather at a local diner where a waitress provides some perspective about life and loneliness.
20	20	"Toto, We're Not in Kansas Anymore"	John Sgueglia	Grace McKeaney	March 28, 1989	219	40.1
A dangerous tornado is heading for Lanford, and the Conners, along with Crystal (who takes shelter at their house), prepare for the storm. Problems arise: Becky insists on retrieving her pet guinea pigs from the garage, while Jackie barely makes it to shelter after a trip to the grocery store, prompting a fight between her and Roseanne.
21	21	"Death and Stuff"	John Sgueglia	Bill Pentland	April 11, 1989	220	39.2
During the family's busy weekend activities, a door-to-door salesman (Jeff Corey) drops dead in the Conner kitchen. Roseanne and Dan attempt to conceal the corpse while potential buyers for their old washer and dryer pass through the house. The police officer responding to their emergency call helps Darlene make baklava for a school project while awaiting the coroner.
22	22	"Dear Mom and Dad"	John Sgueglia	Danny Jacobson	April 18, 1989	221	41.8
An unannounced visit by Roseanne and Jackie's parents throws the Conner house into an uproar. Dan and Jackie urge a usually outspoken Roseanne to stick up for herself. Hostility and craziness abound, but the biggest shock comes when Bev announces they are considering moving to Lanford, though later dismisses this as just a casual idea. Bruce Willis makes a surprise cameo appearance as himself during the end credits. Note: This episode marks the first appearance of Estelle Parsons as Beverly Harris, Roseanne and Jackie's mother.
23	23	"Let's Call It Quits"	John Sgueglia	David McFadzean and Lauren Eve Anderson	May 2, 1989	222	35.8
The Wellman women rebel against the stringent rules imposed by a tough new foreman, Keith Faber (Fred Thompson). After he raises the cap on the quotas yet again, Roseanne asks him to ease off. Faber agrees, but only if Roseanne treats him with deference and undeserved respect. When he reneges on the deal by claiming he now controls Roseanne, she, along with Jackie and their friends, permanently clock out. Final regular appearance of George Clooney as Booker Brooks.

=== Season 2 (1989–90) ===
Note: The entire season was directed by John Pasquin.

Roseanne, season 2 episodes
No. overall	No. in season	Title	Directed by	Written by	Original release date	Prod. code	US viewers (millions)
24	1	"Inherit the Wind"	John Pasquin	Allan Katz	September 12, 1989	301	39.4
Roseanne tries her hand at telephone solicitation after quitting her job at Wellman Plastics. Becky is mortified after breaking wind while giving a speech in front of the school council. Jackie and Roseanne's attempts to console Becky fail until Jimmy (Stephen Dorff) arrives at the Conner house for their Friday night date.
25	2	"The Little Sister"	John Pasquin	Joss Whedon	September 19, 1989	303	38.5
Jackie takes offense at Roseanne's snarky remarks about her career ambitions when she reveals she enrolled in the local police academy. Meanwhile, Darlene taunts Becky for looking at Dan's girlie magazine, and after being chastised by her parents for snitching on Becky, Darlene commiserates with a drunken Jackie about her frustrations over being the younger sister.
26	3	"Guilt by Disassociation"	John Pasquin	Tom Arnold	September 26, 1989	302	41.7
Roseanne is hopeful after a friend recommends her for an office job where her husband works. It would allow Roseanne to quit her hated telemarketing job. After a quick interview, she gets the job, but the celebration is short-lived after the job is revoked due to Roseanne lacking computer skills.
27	4	"Somebody Stole My Gal"	John Pasquin	Martin Pasko and Rebecca Parr	October 3, 1989	304	43.5
When Bert (Kevin Dunn), an emotionally needy architect at Dan's new job site, adopts the Conners as a surrogate family, the family attempts to eject him from their lives.
28	5	"House of Grown-Ups"	John Pasquin	Joss Whedon	October 10, 1989	306	40.8
Roseanne feels abandoned as Jackie prepares to leave for her six-week police academy training. Becky takes Darlene to her first coed party. When Darlene later jibes Becky for making out with her boyfriend, Roseanne gives the girls a talk about boys.
29	6	"Five of a Kind"	John Pasquin	Norma Safford Vela and Danny Jacobson	October 24, 1989	308	38.6
A poker night turns interesting after Dan's friend, Arnie, give Roseanne an unexpected kiss, leaving her unsure if it was platonic or something more. After talking to Jackie about it, Roseanne realizes it was only meant as a friendly, though inappropriate gesture. Note: This episode marks the first appearance of Tom Arnold as Arnie, Dan's friend.
30	7	"Boo!"	John Pasquin	Norma Safford Vela	October 31, 1989	307	36.7
The Conners turn their house into a Halloween "Tunnel of Terror". Roseanne and Dan compete to be the 'Master of Horror' by out-pranking each other. Roseanne finally wins after fooling Dan into believing that her parents are coming for a three-week visit. Becky, upset at not being invited to a classmate's Halloween party, eventually joins the family fun dressed as a dismembered flight attendant.
31	8	"Sweet Dreams"	John Pasquin	Danny Jacobson	November 7, 1989	305	36.3
Roseanne wants to relax in the bathtub but is constantly interrupted by family; she ends up dreaming about being on trial for having murdered her husband and children. Her family comes back to testify on her behalf, and a lavish musical number.
32	9	"We Gather Together"	John Pasquin	Danny Jacobson	November 21, 1989	309	38.8
As the family gathers for Thanksgiving Day, Jackie finally tells her mother she joined the police force, unleashing Bev's anger at both Jackie and Roseanne. After dinner, Dan disapproves when it seems his father is interested in romancing Crystal. Note: Ann Wedgeworth appears in this episode as Audrey, Dan's Mom.
33	10	"Brain-Dead Poets Society"	John Pasquin	Joss Whedon	November 28, 1989	310	37.9
Darlene's poem is rated best in her class and she is asked to read it at her school's Culture Night. Darlene does not want to, but Roseanne puts her foot down.
34	11	"Lobocop"	John Pasquin	Tom Arnold	December 5, 1989	311	36.2
Dan works long hours and Roseanne gets a second job working nights at the Lobo Lounge, leaving both too exhausted for romance. Dan takes the initiative to remedy the matter.
35	12	"No Talking"	John Pasquin	Norma Safford Vela	December 12, 1989	312	37.3
Becky develops a rebellious attitude, resulting in her and Roseanne having a particularly nasty string of fights. Roseanne accuses Dan for always remaining neutral and making her the "bad" parent. After Becky gives Roseanne the silent treatment and locks her out of her and Darlene's bedroom, Roseanne removes the door. While cleaning the girls' bedroom one day, Roseanne finds Becky's "real" diary, but Jackie convinces her to respect her daughter's privacy. Roseanne makes a peace offering by giving back the door. Note: This is the last episode of Roseanne to air in the 1980s.
36	13	"Chicken Hearts"	John Pasquin	Joss Whedon	January 2, 1990	313	39.3
Roseanne's new job at a fried chicken restaurant includes an obnoxious teenaged boss who schedules her to work weekends, interfering with the Conner's family time. In an attempt to change his mind, she invites him to dinner and Dan offers to help with his automotive project for school, but his nasty attitude convinces everyone that Roseanne deserves better treatment. Note: Glenn Shadix appears in this episode as an indecisive customer at the fast-food restaurant. This is the first episode of Roseanne to air in the 1990s.
37	14	"One for the Road"	John Pasquin	Sheree Guitar	January 9, 1990	314	41.4
When Becky and her friend Dana are left at home alone for the day, Becky whips up 'Tornadoes' from the Conner's liquor cabinet, resulting in the girls getting drunk. A hungover Becky is left to explain herself when Dana's mother Karen (Dee Dee Rescher) arrives the next morning demanding to know what happened.
38	15	"An Officer and a Gentleman"	John Pasquin	Danny Jacobson and Norma Safford Vela	January 23, 1990	315	38.8
Jackie steps in as a substitute mom when Roseanne goes to Moline to visit their father, who is in the hospital. Jackie dazzles Dan and the kids with her housekeeping skills right out of a 1950s family sitcom. An appreciative Dan tells Jackie that he is upgrading their sometimes strained relationship from in-laws to friends.
39	16	"Born to Be Wild"	John Pasquin	Stephen Paymer	January 30, 1990	316	38.0
The Conners' old high school biker pal Ziggy roars into town, making Dan and Roseanne feel old and trapped. They realize that while their lives did not turn out as their youthful selves had envisioned, they still feel fulfilled, particularly after Ziggy refurbishes Dan's old Harley motorcycle so Dan can ride again. Note: This episode marks the first of two appearances by Jay O. Sanders as Ziggy, Dan and Roseanne's high school friend.
40	17	"Hair"	John Pasquin	Norma Safford Vela and Danny Jacobson	February 6, 1990	317	35.3
Crystal recommends Roseanne for a job at the beauty salon she frequents, Art's Beauty Shop, sweeping hair, making coffee, and booking appointments. Roseanne is hesitant, feeling it would be degrading, but once she interviewed, she is persuaded into taking the position by the shop's kindly owner. After a short time on the job, she receives a raise and more responsibility.
41	18	"I'm Hungry"	John Pasquin	Danny Jacobson and Norma Safford Vela	February 13, 1990	318	31.1
Roseanne realizes she and Dan need to lose weight. She puts restrictions on their diet, but has the most trouble adapting to the new regime. Roseanne sticks with it and celebrates when she can fit back into her jeans.
42	19	"All of Me"	John Pasquin	Norma Safford Vela and Danny Jacobson	February 20, 1990	319	32.6
Jackie's constant gushing about new boyfriend Gary being 'the one,' causes Roseanne to accuse her of acting like a submissive, lovesick teenager. A big fight ensues between the two sisters.
43	20	"To Tell the Truth"	John Pasquin	Danny Jacobson and Norma Safford Vela	February 27, 1990	320	35.1
After their fight, Jackie gives Roseanne the silent treatment but, when Gary proposes, the sisters reconcile. Roseanne is overjoyed and goes into overdrive with wedding preparations, but Gary and Jackie realize they are unready for marriage and slow down their relationship. Note: As the ending credits roll there are photographs of the wedding of Prince Charles and Lady Diana Spencer.
44	21	"Fender Bender"	John Pasquin	Penelope Spheeris and Bill Gerber	March 20, 1990	322	34.3
While moving her car outside the beauty shop, Roseanne is rear-ended by Mrs. Wellman, injuring her neck and requiring her to take time off from work to recuperate at home. When Mrs. Wellman does not apologize, Roseanne considers suing her. Mrs. Wellman offers a smaller counter proposal.
45	22	"April Fool's Day"	John Pasquin	Stephen Paymer	April 10, 1990	323	33.4
It is tax day and Dan and Roseanne stress out trying to complete their tax form until they are forced to go to the IRS office.
46	23	"Fathers and Daughters"	John Pasquin	Kim C. Friese	May 1, 1990	324	32.6
Roseanne accuses Dan of favoring Darlene over Becky until he points out that she does the same thing with Becky. In an attempt to individually bond with their daughters, Dan takes Becky to the mall and Roseanne goes to Darlene's basketball game. Dan and Roseanne finally realize their daughters are unique and respond to each parent differently.
47	24	"Happy Birthday"	John Pasquin	Geraldine Barr and Maxine Epstein	May 8, 1990	321	27.8
On her birthday, Roseanne wishes for more time to write. Dan and the kids surprise her by creating a writing studio in the basement. Unfortunately, Roseanne is then hit with a severe case of writer's block.

=== Season 3 (1990–91) ===
Roseanne, season 3 episodes
No. overall	No. in season	Title	Directed by	Written by	Original release date	Prod. code	US viewers (millions)
48	1	"The Test"	John Whitesell	Bob Myer	September 18, 1990	401	29.8
One Saturday, Roseanne fails to shoo everyone out of the house, while Dan keeps postponing Becky's driving lesson. Roseanne secretly enlists Jackie and Crystal's help in taking a home pregnancy test. When it is discovered what they are up to, everyone awaits the results together. The test is negative, leaving Roseanne both relieved and sad.
49	2	"Friends & Relatives"	John Whitesell	Chuck Lorre	September 25, 1990	402	26.2
Dan lends Arnie $1,500 to buy Nancy an engagement ring. Arnie instead spends it on her breast implants, infuriating Roseanne. When Dan falls behind on the bills, Jackie offers to lend him money, but he refuses because she is family. D.J. starts peeping on his sisters.
50	3	"Like a Virgin"	John Whitesell	Brad Isaacs	October 2, 1990	404	27.2
Roseanne and Dan think it is time to talk discuss birth controle with Becky, then later catch Darlene making out on the couch with her "platonic" friend, Brian. Roseanne cautions the girls to slow down.
51	4	"Like, A New Job"	John Whitesell	Jeff Abugov	October 9, 1990	403	31.3
Roseanne quits her job at Art's Beauty Shop and gets a waitress job at the Rodbell's department store's luncheonette, much to Becky and Darlene's displeasure as it is where they hang out with their friends. Roseanne complains that Dan does too little to handle the kids' disputes. After Becky and Darlene fight over their room yet again, Dan sends Darlene to sleep in the basement bedroom. Roseanne disapproves of how Dan handled the situation, though his solution resolves the issue and Darlene returns to the upstairs bedroom. Note: Alyson Hannigan guest stars in this episode as one of Becky's friends.
52	5	"Goodbye Mr. Right"	John Whitesell	Bruce Graham	October 16, 1990	405	26.4
Becky and Darlene think D.J. is a psycho when they find his under-the-bed secret stash of tiny, dismembered dolls. Jackie is injured in the line of duty and recuperates at the Conner house. When her boyfriend Gary issues an ultimatum that she quit the force or end their relationship, Jackie chooses the latter.
53	6	"Becky, Beds & Boys"	John Whitesell	Jennifer Heath and Amy Sherman	October 23, 1990	406	30.1
Roseanne and Dan shop for a new mattress. Becky dates Mark, a rebellious punk teen who Dan and Roseanne dislike after he disrespects them. They forbid Becky from seeing Mark again after running into him at the Lobo Lounge using a fake I.D. Note: This episode marks the first appearance of Glenn Quinn as Mark, Becky's rebellious boyfriend and future husband.
54	7	"Trick or Treat"	John Whitesell	Story by : Chuck Lorre; Teleplay by : Chuck Lorre and Jeff Abugov	October 30, 1990	407	29.1
Roseanne dresses as a male trucker for the lodge Halloween party. When she and Jackie get stranded at the Lobo Lounge, Roseanne mingles with some random men there and incites one man's ire by making veiled pointed comments about his boastful sexual claims. Meanwhile, Dan is upset that D.J. chooses to be a witch for Halloween.
55	8	"PMS, I Love You"	John Whitesell	Tom Arnold	November 6, 1990	408	28.2
Roseanne's PMS coincides with Dan's birthday. His attempt to escape for the day by going fishing is halted by Jackie who says that Roseanne is throwing him a surprise party at the lodge, where he and the rest of family are forced to endure Roseanne's ever-changing moods.
56	9	"Bird Is the Word"	John Whitesell	Joel Madison and Don Foster	November 13, 1990	409	27.1
Becky is suspended for allegedly making an obscene gesture in her class photo, earning her popularity at school, but angering Roseanne when she has to visit the principal, who suspends Becky and other classmates involved. Dan has plans for Becky's suspension at home. It is later learned that the student next to Becky made the gesture, not Becky, but she enjoyed the notoriety. While at the principal's office, Roseanne is reunited with her old high school friend, Anne-Marie, who is now married to Chuck Mitchell.
57	10	"Dream Lover"	John Whitesell	Chuck Lorre	November 27, 1990	410	28.3
Dan feels pressured about his and Roseanne's "Always Wednesday" sex night. When he starts dreaming about Rodbell's redhead hardware store clerk, Marge (Patrika Darbo), Roseanne feels threatened and decides she must meet Marge. When Marge happens to come into the luncheonette one day, Roseanne thinks she's cute, but she is unlike what Jackie and Crystal expected. Dan and Roseanne have a frank talk about their romantic life and agree to do away with "Always Wednesdays" and be more spontaneous.
58	11	"Do You Know Where Your Parents Are?"	John Whitesell	David A. Caplan and Brian LaPan	December 4, 1990	411	28.5
When Becky and Darlene continually break curfew, Dan and Roseanne decide to teach them a lesson by staying out late. They send Jackie to the house to trick the girls into worrying about them. The plan backfires when the sisters figure out the scheme.
59	12	"Confessions"	John Whitesell	Brad Isaacs	December 18, 1990	412	27.4
When Bev pays a surprise visit, Roseanne tricks Jackie into coming over for her share of their mother's abuse. Roseanne is crushed when Bev says she and the girls' father always considered Roseanne as the 'ordinary' one who was destined to be a housewife and mother, while Jackie had creative potential. Bev's praise quickly turns to anger when Jackie admits to throwing away an admission letter to a design school her parents wanted her to attend.
60	13	"The Courtship of Eddie, Dan's Father"	John Whitesell	Story by : Bob Myer; Teleplay by : Don Foster and Joel Madison	January 8, 1991	413	28.9
Dan's estranged father, Ed, makes a surprise visit. Meanwhile, Roseanne attempts to set Crystal up with Don, an eligible bachelor who works at the mall, but Jackie upends her plans by unexpectedly showing up for dinner. When Roseanne walks in on Crystal and Ed kissing in the bedroom, she coerces Jackie into taking Don for a drive so she can learn what is going on with the pair. Dan wants to make amends with Ed, but their short-lived truce abruptly ends when Ed announces that he and Crystal are engaged.
61	14	"The Wedding"	John Whitesell	Jeff Abugov	January 15, 1991	414	30.5
Dan struggles to accept Ed and Crystal's unlikely pairing, especially when Crystal announces that she is pregnant. Dan refuses to attend their wedding, but relents and shows up at the last minute as best man.
62	15	"Becky Doesn't Live Here Anymore"	Gail Mancuso Cordray	Amy Sherman and Jennifer Heath	January 22, 1991	415	30.0
Becky storms out of the house and goes to Jackie's after being grounded for lying about seeing Mark and being forbidden from dating him. Darlene confronts Becky about her selfish behavior and getting her into trouble.
63	16	"Home-Ec"	John Whitesell	Mark Lloyd Rappaport	February 5, 1991	416	28.5
Roseanne is miffed that Darlene's home-economics class has only invited fathers to discuss their careers for Career Day. She visits the class to talk about being a working wife and mother, then takes Darlene and her fellow female classmates on a field trip to the supermarket, followed by them preparing dinner at the Conner house. Meanwhile, Dan tries to help D.J. with a bullying problem at school, but it turns out D.J. has hired a bodyguard to defend him, using Twinkies as payment. Note: This episode features an early appearance by Leonardo DiCaprio as one of Darlene's classmates. He has no lines of dialogue and his name is not listed in the end credits.
64	17	"Valentine's Day"	John Whitesell	Bob Myer	February 12, 1991	417	28.5
Roseanne anticipates a special Valentine's Day gift from Dan but is disappointed. Darlene is upset when her crush asks Becky to a school dance instead of her. Note: This episode marks the first appearances of Martin Mull, as Leon, Roseanne's new boss, and Bonnie Sheridan as Bonnie, Roseanne's co-worker and friend
65	18	"Communicable Theater"	John Whitesell	Jennifer Heath and Amy Sherman	February 19, 1991	418	29.4
Roseanne lends more than moral support when Jackie lands a part in the community-theater production of Cyrano de Bergerac. Jackie, the understudy, is unprepared when she has to step in for the sick lead actress.
66	19	"Vegas Interruptus"	John Whitesell	Story by : Bob Myer; Teleplay by : Chuck Lorre and Jeff Abugov	February 26, 1991	419	28.6
Leon refuses to allow Roseanne time off for her and Dan's trip to Las Vegas which was planned months before Leon became boss. Roseanne does not want to quit, but Dan insists she sacrifice her job so they can go. Roseanne relents, but a snowstorm grounds their plane, cancelling the trip. Roseanne returns to Rodbell's luncheonette and is forced to ask for her job back.
67	20	"Her Boyfriend's Back"	John Whitesell	Story by : Sheldon Krasner and David Saling; Teleplay by : Brad Isaacs and Maxine Lapiduss	March 12, 1991	420	31.5
Dan is furious to discover that Mark and Becky rode his vintage Harley motorcycle without permission, and that Mark tinkered with the engine. After defending her earlier per Mark, Dan gives Becky the silent treatment. Roseanne confronts Mark about his true intentions.
68	21	"Troubles with the Rubbles"	John Whitesell	Joel Madison	March 26, 1991	421	27.7
Roseanne meets new neighbors Kathy and Jerry Bowman, and their young son, Todd, who have moved to Lanford from Chicago. Jerry and Dan and D.J. and Todd hit it off, respectively, but Kathy snubs Roseanne. After a particularly nasty argument with Kathy, Roseanne has to eat some crow for D.J.'s sake.
69	22	"Second Time Around"	John Whitesell	Maxine Lapiduss	April 2, 1991	422	23.2
Roseanne, Crystal's back-up birth coach, assists Crystal in her Lamaze classes. After Dan's near-fatal accident at work, D.J. follows him around obsessively. After reconsidering their will, Dan and Roseanne decide Ed and Crystal should take the kids if they should die suddenly. Jackie is upset and offended and insists she is closer to the kids than anyone. Dan and Roseanne finally realize Jackie is the best person and make her their guardian.
70	23	"Dances with Darlene"	Gail Mancuso Cordray	Brad Isaacs	April 30, 1991	425	25.3
One of Darlene's schoolmates, Barry, asks her to go to their school's spring ball with him. Roseanne brings home fancy dresses for her to try on, eventually upsetting Darlene, who then refuses to go to the dance. Meanwhile, it is evaluation time at work for Roseanne and Bonnie, but the visiting inspector seems more interested in Leon. Roseanne and Bonnie discover that Leon is gay when his boyfriend stops by the restaurant. Darlene does not change her mind about the dance, but says it was not just because of her mother and admits she did not feel like herself in a fancy dress. Barry invites Darlene out for pizza instead.
71	24	"Scenes from a Barbecue"	John Whitesell	Bob Myer and Chuck Lorre	May 7, 1991	423	25.6
The Conners host a Mother's Day barbecue. Note: This episode marks the first appearance of Shelley Winters as Nana Mary, Roseanne and Jackie's grandmother.
72	25	"The Pied Piper of Lanford"	John Whitesell	Jeff Abugov	May 14, 1991	424	21.9
Roseanne and Dan ponder opening a motorcycle shop with their friend Ziggy, who has returned to Lanford. Dan and Roseanne agree to take out a second mortgage on the house. Ziggy gets cold feet at the last minute and leaves town, but not without leaving his stake in the business: $20,000. Brad Garrett appears in this episode. Note: This episode marks the final appearance of Jay O. Sanders as Ziggy.

=== Season 4 (1991–92) ===
Roseanne, season 4 episodes
No. overall	No. in season	Title	Directed by	Written by	Original release date	Prod. code	US viewers (millions)
73	1	"A Bitter Pill to Swallow"	Andrew D. Weyman	Amy Sherman and Jennifer Heath	September 17, 1991	501	28.5
While the Conners are preparing to open their own bike shop, Becky seeks birth control advice from Jackie, who encourages her to also talk to Roseanne. Becky later confides to her mother that she has already slept with Mark.
74	2	"Take My Bike ... Please!"	Andrew D. Weyman	Story by : Mark Rosewater; Teleplay by : Bob Myer	September 24, 1991	504	32.8
Dan and Roseanne, working 15-hour days, leave Becky in charge at home, causing friction between Becky and Darlene. D.J. starts to feel neglected. Note: This episode marks the first appearance of Dan Butler as Art, a customer who later becomes the Conners' accountant for the bike shop.
75	3	"Why Jackie Becomes a Trucker"	Andrew D. Weyman	Chuck Lorre	October 1, 1991	502	33.4
Jackie is horrified to wake up in bed with Arnie after a drunken fling she is unable to remember. Roseanne continually attempts to return a dog that a neighbor gave away to D.J. Dan and his pals discover Leon is gay when they invite him to their poker game. Jackie decides to start a new career as a professional truck driver.
76	4	"Darlene Fades to Black"	Andrew D. Weyman	Jeff Abugov	October 8, 1991	503	32.0
Darlene slips into a depressive state, constantly spending time alone. Meanwhile, Becky has her eye on a motor scooter from Dan's shop.
77	5	"Tolerate Thy Neighbor"	Andrew D. Weyman	Maxine Lapiduss and Martin Mull	October 15, 1991	505	31.0
When the Bowmans are out of town, Roseanne witnesses their possessions being removed by what she believes is a charity group. Kathy Bowman is furious after learning that Roseanne watched the theft without realizing the house was being robbed. Note: Bob Hope makes a cameo appearance as a line-up participant during the end-credits of this episode.
78	6	"Trick Me Up, Trick Me Down"	Andrew D. Weyman	Amy Sherman	October 29, 1991	506	36.7
Dan and Roseanne play a gruesome Halloween prank on Kathy Bowman. Roseanne expects Kathy will retaliate and is disappointed that Kathy wants nothing to do with Roseanne and her juvenile pranks. At the Lodge's Halloween party, Jackie discovers that the moose she has been flirting with is Booker, her former boyfriend. Dan and Jerry stage an obvious trick to appear as Kathy has taken revenge, thus mollifying Roseanne, who lets an unsuspecting Becky be the target. Note: This episode marks the final appearance of George Clooney as Booker.
79	7	"Vegas"	Andrew D. Weyman	Don Foster and Sid Youngers	November 5, 1991	507	32.4
Arnie and Nancy invite Roseanne and Dan to their Las Vegas wedding. Once there, Roseanne and Dan have a fight when she feels neglected because he prefers shooting craps.
80	8	"Vegas, Vegas"	Andrew D. Weyman	Joel Madison and Mark Rosewater	November 12, 1991	508	36.1
Roseanne is still upset that Dan would rather play craps than spend a romantic night together. She and Nancy get drunk and wander into a Wayne Newton impersonator performance. Roseanne starts heckling the performer, unaware it is the real Wayne Newton who is making a surprise on-stage appearance. After Arnie and Nancy's wedding, they offer Dan and Roseanne the chance to renew their vows.
81	9	"Stressed to Kill"	Andrew D. Weyman	Story by : Bob Myer and Chuck Lorre; Teleplay by : Jeff Abugov and Maxine Lapiduss	November 19, 1991	510	28.5
Roseanne secretly resumes smoking to cope with her stressful life—then tries to hide the renewed habit from her family. Roseanne is thrilled when Darlene gets a B on a school report until she learns that Becky actually wrote it for her.
82	10	"Thanksgiving '91"	Andrew D. Weyman	Brad Isaacs	November 26, 1991	509	29.7
Bev attends Thanksgiving dinner without Jackie and Roseanne's father, Al. Bev shocks them when she finally admits Al is in Kansas City, spending the holiday with his mistress, who he has been seeing for 20 years. Darlene stays secluded in her room and only opens up to Nana Mary.
83	11	"Kansas City, Here We Come"	Andrew D. Weyman	Story by : Amy Sherman and David Forbes; Teleplay by : Don Foster and Jennifer Heath	December 3, 1991	511	34.6
Jackie and Roseanne head to Kansas City, intending to confront Joan, their father's mistress. Once there, they are about to chicken out and leave when Joan opens her door. Dan goes to beat up Becky's boss at the Buy N' Bag for being grossly disrespectful to her, but finds that Mark has beaten him to it.
84	12	"Santa Claus"	Andrew D. Weyman	Story by : Barry Vigon; Teleplay by : Chuck Lorre and Maxine Lapiduss	December 24, 1991	512	32.3
Roseanne and Jackie are the new Santa and Mrs. Claus at Rodbell's; while on duty, Roseanne meets Darlene's new friend Karen, and Karen's son. She is resentful that Darlene refused to open up to her but has shared her writing with Karen.
85	13	"Bingo"	Andrew D. Weyman	Story by : Tom Arnold and Robert Miranda; Teleplay by : Joel Madison and Sid Youngers	January 7, 1992	513	36.4
Crystal, Roseanne, Bonnie, Anne Marie, and Jackie have a girl's night out, while Becky and Darlene babysit Little Ed. Roseanne ridicules Crystal for choosing bingo, but after winning, she quickly becomes addicted, sparking a fight with Crystal. Later, Crystal explains she became upset because she is pregnant again and is overwhelmed raising Little Ed and teen son, Lonnie, while Ed is often away on business.
86	14	"The Bowling Show"	Andrew D. Weyman	Story by : Don Foster; Teleplay by : Jeff Abugov and Amy Sherman	January 21, 1992	514	32.4
Dan and Arnie struggle to bring their bowling team out of last place, while Roseanne feels shut out of Jackie and Nancy's new friendship. Darlene meets Mark's younger brother for the first time, setting off a mutual attraction. David Crosby appears as Bonnie's partner, Duke, who performs with Bonnie at the bowling alley restaurant. Note: This episode marks the first appearance of Johnny Galecki as David (referred to as Kevin in this episode) Healy, Darlene's boyfriend and later husband, and Mark's brother.
87	15	"The Back Story"	Andrew D. Weyman	Bob Myer	February 4, 1992	515	37.1
Bev arrives in time to help with D.J.'s 11th birthday, after Roseanne throws her back out. Dan is thrilled he bought D.J. a Super Nintendo as a birthday present and strikes a car-buying deal with Becky, only to have Bev upend him on both counts.
88	16	"Less Is More"	Gail Mancuso Cordray	Story by : Amy Sherman; Teleplay by : Maxine Lapiduss and Don Foster	February 11, 1992	517	28.1
Roseanne's doctor recommends a breast reduction to reduce stress on her back. She agrees but has a nightmare in which her breasts are accidentally enlarged to gigantic proportions. Note: Neil Patrick Harris makes a cameo appearance as Doogie Howser, MD in this episode.
89	17	"Breaking Up Is Hard to Do"	Andrew D. Weyman	Jennifer Heath	February 18, 1992	516	32.4
When Becky breaks up with Mark, she dates a new boy, Dean, who Dan excitedly considers "son-in-law" material. Roseanne and Jackie dash his hopes by explaining that Dean is the "transitional guy" and guarantee that the next boy Becky dates who Dan hates will be the "keeper."
90	18	"This Old House"	Andrew D. Weyman	Story by : Michael Poryes; Teleplay by : Chuck Lorre and Jeff Abugov	February 25, 1992	518	30.1
Darlene and David have been producing their own comic book in which Darlene writes the story and David illustrates it. When Dan and Roseanne discover she and David skipped school to attend a comic book convention in Chicago, Darlene is grounded and forbidden to see David again. Jackie and Roseanne break into their now-vacant childhood home that is slated to be demolished. They relive painful childhood memories about their physically abusive father. Jackie persuades Roseanne to allow Darlene to see David again, stressing how important them working on their comic book together is to them and how it has helped Darlene to overcome her depression.
91	19	"The Commercial Show"	Andrew D. Weyman	Story by : Maxine Lapiduss and Chuck Lorre; Teleplay by : Maxine Lapiduss and Jennifer Heath	March 3, 1992	519	34.6
The Conners are chosen to be in a Rodbell's commercial, much to Darlene's embarrassment and Roseanne's disappointment after the director replaces her with Jackie as "the mother". Leon and his partner break up. To everyone's delight, the Bowmans are moving back to Chicago. Note: Sara Gilbert had her hair made up in pigtails to look like Laura Ingalls played by her older sister Melissa Gilbert in Little House on the Prairie.
92	20	"Therapy"	Andrew D. Weyman	Story by : Chuck Lorre; Teleplay by : Joel Madison and Sid Youngers	March 17, 1992	520	33.8
After Darlene mouths off about a girl at school, Becky warns her that the burly girl is planning to beat her up. Roseanne accompanies Jackie to her therapist to work out their "sister" issues.
93	21	"Lies"	Andrew D. Weyman	Story by : Jeff Abugov; Teleplay by : Don Foster and Sid Youngers	March 24, 1992	521	37.6
Roseanne is ticked off that Darlene bypasses her for advice on David. Roseanne is anxious about a lie detector test at her workplace, after taking condiments from the restaurant. She soon suspects the test is actually about something else: Leon being gay.
94	22	"Deliverance"	Gail Mancuso Cordray	Story by : Chuck Lorre; Teleplay by : Jeff Abugov and Joel Madison	March 31, 1992	522	37.0
Eight-months-pregnant Crystal goes into labor and Dan coaches her as she gives birth to a long-awaited daughter she names Angela. After Leon quits, Roseanne and Bonnie squabble over who should manage the coffee shop. The feud causes Roseanne to refuse Bonnie's phone calls, resulting in Roseanne and Jackie nearly missing Crystal's daughter being born. Bonnie arrives at the hospital and informs Roseanne that the luncheonette is closing down in three weeks, leaving them both unemployed. Darlene tells David to stop crowding her, though he has difficulty spending less time together.
95	23	"Secrets"	Andrew D. Weyman	Lawrence H. Levy	April 28, 1992	524	33.5
Depressed because Becky refuses to see him, Mark gets drunk at the Lobo Lounge and puts his fist through the jukebox. Dan tends to him, then lies to Roseanne and Becky about it, though Roseanne sees through the ruse and punishes Dan.
96	24	"Don't Make Me Over"	Andrew D. Weyman	Story by : Sara Gilbert; Teleplay by : Maxine Lapiduss and Don Foster & Sid Youngers	May 5, 1992	523	31.9
Roseanne grounds D.J. from watching TV after he gets a bad report from his math teacher. She chides Dan for always leaving the kids' punishments up to her while he remains neutral. Meanwhile, Becky and Darlene, determined to attend a rock concert in Iowa, scheme to soften up Roseanne with a Mother's Day spa-pampering. Roseanne is thrilled until she discovers their ulterior motive. A furious Dan takes charge and punishes them by sending them to spend the weekend with Bev.
97	25	"Aliens"	Andrew D. Weyman	Story by : Joel Madison and Ron Nelson; Teleplay by : Jeff Abugov and Joel Madison	May 12, 1992	525	32.7
D.J.'s spelling-bee triumph is a welcome bright spot as Rodbell's luncheonette closes down and Dan's bike shop continues its slow descent. Meanwhile, Nancy is heartbroken when Arnie leaves her, especially when he claims he was abducted by aliens.

=== Season 5 (1992–93) ===
Roseanne, season 5 episodes
No. overall	No. in season	Title	Directed by	Written by	Original release date	Prod. code	US viewers (millions)
98	1	"Terms of Estrangement"	Andrew D. Weyman	Sy Dukane and Denise Moss	September 15, 1992	601	36.7
99	2	"Terms of Estrangement"	Andrew D. Weyman	Rob Ulin	September 22, 1992	602	36.0
Part 1: Roseanne and Dan adjust to losing their bike shop while seeking new jobs. Meanwhile, when Mark receives a great job offer in Minneapolis, he and Becky secretly elope. Part 2: Becky returns home to collect her belongings, while Roseanne struggles to accept her daughter's marriage and tries to cheer-up Dan after he closes the bike shop. Dan avoids talking to Becky.
100	3	"The Dark Ages"	Andrew D. Weyman	Eric Gilliland and Mike Gandolfi	September 29, 1992	603	35.9
The Conners' electricity is cut off when they fall behind on the bill. Darlene and David stay up all night in Darlene's bedroom working on their comic book. When Roseanne and Dan do not believe Darlene when she insists they did not sleep together, she lashes out, feeling punished for Becky's mistakes. Dan phones Becky, finally thawing the ice between them. This episode concludes by breaking the fourth wall with Roseanne and Laurie Metcalf wrestling over the Emmy award that Metcalf won. John Goodman eventually joined in before they all ran offstage and out a studio door accompanied by Tom Arnold.
101	4	"Mommy Nearest"	Andrew D. Weyman	Janice Jordan and Monica Piper	October 6, 1992	604	33.7
Jackie starts dating the much-younger Fisher, played by Metcalf's real-life then-husband Matt Roth. Bev moves to Lanford after selling her house, making a large profit. She then gives Roseanne and Jackie $10,000 each. Note: This episode marks the first appearance of Matt Roth as Fisher, Jackie's new boyfriend.
102	5	"Pretty in Black"	Andrew D. Weyman	Amy Sherman	October 13, 1992	605	31.5
Dan and Roseanne enjoy torturing Darlene by pretending to throw a dreaded Sweet-Sixteen birthday party before sending her off to celebrate with friends at the pizza parlor. While playing "Truth or Dare" with Jackie, Anne Maire, and Crystal, Roseanne suffers an embarrassing incident when she unexpectedly meets the Conner's new neighbor, Ty Tilden, a single father with two teenaged daughters: shy Charlotte and promiscuous Molly. Note: This episode marks the first appearances of Wings Hauser, Mara Hobel, and Danielle Harris as Ty, Charlotte, and Molly Tilden, the Conners' new neighbors, respectively.
103	6	"Looking for Loans in All the Wrong Places"	Andrew D. Weyman	Eileen Heisler and DeAnn Heline	October 20, 1992	606	30.4
Roseanne and Jackie decide to open a diner with Nancy, using the money that Bev gave them. When they are unable to get a bank loan for the additional needed capital, Bev agrees to put up another $10,000, but only as a 4th partner. Molly, complains to Darlene about D.J.'s peeping at her through the bedroom window. Darlene confronts Molly about her flirtatious behavior with David.
104	7	"Halloween IV"	Andrew D. Weyman	Rob Ulin	October 27, 1992	607	37.0
Becky's absence has drained Roseanne's Halloween spirit, so she is visited by the ghosts of Halloween Past, Present, and a truly terrifying Future. Her prankster spirit restored, she joins the others at the Lodge Halloween party. Note: Laurie Metcalf's real-life daughter, Zoe Perry, makes a cameo appearance as a young Jackie in flashback.
105	8	"Ladies' Choice"	Andrew D. Weyman	Betsy Borns and David Raether	November 10, 1992	608	32.4
Roseanne and Jackie are shocked to discover that Nancy is a lesbian. Roseanne thinks she is the one getting old when Bev moves into a retirement community.
106	9	"Stand on Your Man"	Andrew D. Weyman	Denise Moss and Sy Dukane	November 17, 1992	610	33.7
Roseanne, working a late shift at the diner alone, is threatened by an aggressive customer, prompting the girls to take a self-defense class. When Arnie wants to return to Nancy, he learns she is a lesbian.
107	10	"Good Girls, Bad Girls"	Andrew D. Weyman	Amy Sherman	November 24, 1992	609	30.5
Molly has an extra ticket for a rock concert in a neighboring town, and Roseanne reluctantly allows Darlene to go. When Darlene arrives home in a cab at 4:00 a.m., Roseanne initially doubts her explanation that Molly ditched her to smoke pot in a stranger's van. Note: Lecy Goranson appears in this episode's opening scene, marking her final appearance as Becky until the season eight premiere.
108	11	"Of Ice and Men"	Andrew D. Weyman	Robert Borden and Norm Macdonald	December 1, 1992	611	35.2
Fisher offers to coach D.J. in hockey. Jackie breaks up with Fisher, fearing he will leave her for a younger woman. When Roseanne convinces Jackie to get back together with him, they move in together.
109	12	"It's No Place Like Home for the Holidays"	Andrew D. Weyman	Eric Gilliland	December 15, 1992	612	34.4
A snowstorm forces the Conners to be far-flung on Christmas Eve: Roseanne, Jackie, Bev, and Nana Mary are stuck at the Lunchbox; Dan, D.J., Nancy and Nancy's girlfriend, Marla (Morgan Fairchild) are trapped at the Conner house. Darlene, stranded at David's, witnesses his abusive mother's behavior, and comes to appreciate her stable parents.
110	13	"Crime and Punishment"	Andrew D. Weyman	Bruce Rasmussen	January 5, 1993	613	38.3
The Conners are called to D.J.'s school to discuss the "obscene" reading material he brought to class. Dan and Roseanne are shocked that it is one of Darlene and David's comic books. Later, Darlene accidentally walks in on Jackie in D.J.'s bathroom, finding her covered with bruises. Roseanne presses Jackie for an explanation and learns that Fisher assaulted her. Dan beats up Fisher and lands in jail. Ed Begley Jr. appears in this episode. Brice Beckham (Mr. Belvedere) appears.
111	14	"War and Peace"	Andrew D. Weyman	DeAnn Heline and Eileen Heisler	January 12, 1993	614	38.8
As Roseanne takes Jackie to the hospital and Darlene bails Dan out of jail, the news of Dan hitting Fisher quickly spreads through town. Meanwhile, Fisher begs Jackie to come back. Roseanne is shocked that this was not the first time Fisher hit Jackie. Jackie shows she is strong enough to make her own decisions and leaves him for good. Note: This episode marks the final appearance of Matt Roth as Fisher.
112	15	"Lanford Daze"	Andrew D. Weyman	Monica Piper and David Raether	January 26, 1993	615	N/A
Vegetarian Darlene vandalizes the Lunch Box as a protest against eating animals. To punish Darlene, Roseanne forces her to sell loose-meat sandwiches at the diner's Lanford Days festival concession stand. Note: Country music star Loretta Lynn appears in this episode as herself.
113	16	"Wait Till Your Father Gets Home"	Andrew D. Weyman	Amy Sherman	February 9, 1993	616	32.3
Roseanne and Jackie's father dies. His mistress, Joan, shows up for the funeral, causing friction between Roseanne and Jackie and a confrontation with Bev. Roseanne is angry that her father never regretted his abusive behavior, particularly after Joan says her dad believed he was a wonderful father and felt Roseanne and Jackie were ungrateful daughters.
114	17	"First Cousin, Twice Removed"	Andrew D. Weyman	Janice Jordan	February 16, 1993	617	29.0
Roseanne's wealthy cousin comes to town, hoping to end a years-long feud with Roseanne, after she excluded Roseanne from her wedding party. Ronnie encourages Darlene to follow her writing dream to move to New York City, offering her a place to stay. Note: Joan Collins appears as Ronnie, Roseanne and Jackie's estranged cousin.
115	18	"Lose a Job, Winnebago"	Andrew D. Weyman	Norm Macdonald	February 23, 1993	618	33.3
The Conners go on a road trip to California with the Tildens for a taping of The Jackie Thomas Show; Dan tells Roseanne he wants to have another child, though Roseanne is cool to the idea. Note: This episode marks the final appearance of Wings Hauser as Ty Tilden.
116	19	"It's a Boy!"	Andrew D. Weyman	Rob Ulin	March 2, 1993	619	31.2
David's parents are divorcing and his mother is moving to another town. Darlene begs Roseanne to let David move in with them. Roseanne relents only after witnessing first-hand his mother's abusive behavior. The next obstacle is convincing Dan, who finally relents and allows David to move in, but only under strict rules for him and Darlene.
117	20	"It Was Twenty Years Ago Today"	Andrew D. Weyman	Betsy Borns	March 9, 1993	620	29.4
Rosanne flies into a tizzy when she is unable to find her wedding ring, unaware that Dan secretly borrowed it to have it redesigned as a 20th anniversary gift. Roseanne poses for a sexy photograph to give to Dan but is angry when he has to work on their anniversary night, unaware he took the temporary job to pay for the ring. Bill Maher appears in this episode.
118	21	"Playing with Matches"	Andrew D. Weyman	Robert Borden	March 23, 1993	621	32.6
Roseanne wants to set her mother up with a friend from the retirement home; Molly puts the moves on David.
119	22	"Promises, Promises"	Andrew D. Weyman	Mike Gandolfi	April 6, 1993	622	28.6
Darlene attends the high school prom with David, then surprises him afterward with a motel room she has rented, leaving him excited until he is unable to meet the challenge. Jackie is surprised and jealous when Nancy goes back to men by dating Roger (Tim Curry), a developer who flips houses for profit and wants Dan to go into business with him. Note: This episode marks the final appearance of Mara Hobel as Charlotte Tilden and Danielle Harris as Molly Tilden.
120	23	"Glengarry, Glen Rosey"	Philip Charles MacKenzie	Story by : Sy Dukane and Denise Moss; Teleplay by : Lois Bromfield and Scott Burton	May 4, 1993	623	22.2
Dan, working with Roger, remodels an old house to flip for a profit. When a buyer backs out at the last minute, Dan could lose his own house after Roger abruptly flees town, owing money and stiffing Dan with the bills that are due. Jackie, currently living with Bev at the retirement home, makes a big decision by buying the house, saving Dan and Roseanne from financial ruin. Tim Curry appears in this episode. Chris Farley has an uncredited cameo in this episode.
121	24	"Tooth or Consequences"	Gail Mancuso	Leslie Rieder	May 11, 1993	624	27.0
Dan accidentally knocks out Roseanne's tooth the day the health inspector, who turns out to be her old boss, Leon, arrives at the restaurant. After Darlene and David consummate their relationship, Darlene gets accepted to a Chicago arts college, but says nothing about it after David is turned down by the same school. Bob Odenkirk appears in this episode.
122	25	"Daughters and Other Strangers"	Jeff Margolis	Eric Gilliland	May 18, 1993	625	28.8
Roseanne and Dan refuse to allow Darlene to attend the Chicago arts college until after she graduates high school the following year. Darlene intends to go anyway, then changes her mind. After learning that David threatened to break-up with Darlene if she does go, Roseanne relents, not wanting her daughter to abandon her goals for a guy. When Darlene admits her real reason is fear of failing, Roseanne convinces her to go. D.J. befriends George, a boring and annoying neighbor boy (Joseph Gordon-Levitt).

=== Season 6 (1993–94) ===
Roseanne, season 6 episodes
No. overall	No. in season	Title	Directed by	Written by	Original release date	Prod. code	US viewers (millions)
123	1	"Two Down, One to Go"	Philip Charles MacKenzie	Amy Sherman	September 14, 1993	701	30.1
Darlene refuses to allow Roseanne drive her to Chicago for school. Desperate to keep Darlene from leaving, David proposes marriage, which Darlene declines as a crazy idea. Roseanne insists on taking Darlene to Chicago, and ends up spending the night in Darlene's new apartment where they engage in a frank mother-daughter talk.
124	2	"The Mommy's Curse"	Philip Charles MacKenzie	Eric Gilliland	September 21, 1993	705	27.7
Roseanne and Jackie have reached their limit tolerating Bev at the Lunchbox. Bev agrees to step aside, but secretly sells her share to Leon, Roseanne's old boss. Elsewhere, Fred, Dan's co-worker at the garage, asks Jackie out for a date. Note: This episode marks the first appearance of Michael O'Keefe as Fred, Jackie's later husband.
125	3	"Party Politics"	Philip Charles MacKenzie	Miriam Trogdon	September 28, 1993	703	29.4
Roseanne orchestrates a weekend at home for David and Darlene to get them back together. When Darlene discovers her mother's plan, she teams up with D.J., who has been skipping school. Darlene covers for him, but Roseanne, suspecting what is going on, utilizes Fred's help to expose them. Darlene and David get back together but Darlene keeps it a secret so Roseanne cannot take credit, but Roseanne tricks her into revealing it. Jackie turns down Fred for another date after their one-night stand.
126	4	"A Stash from the Past"	Philip Charles MacKenzie	Kevin Abbott	October 5, 1993	706	30.4
Roseanne punishes David after finding marijuana in his basement bedroom. David, thinking it is Darlene's, covers for her by claiming it is his. Darlene suspects it is Becky's. Dan realizes that it is actually Roseanne's 20-year-old stash. When the house is empty, he, Roseanne, and Jackie indulge once more for old times' sake but admit it was always a bad choice. Note: In 1997, TV Guide ranked this episode #21 on its list of the 100 Greatest Episodes. This is generally considered to be the last episode in the continuity later used by season 10 of Roseanne (and spinoff series The Conners); the rest of season 6, as well as seasons 7-9, were retconned out of the show's official story chronology.
127	5	"Be My Baby"	Philip Charles MacKenzie	Rob Ulin	October 19, 1993	707	31.9
Roseanne has been trying unsuccessfully for months to get pregnant, but it is Jackie who announces she is expecting after her one-night stand with Fred. She does not intend to tell Fred and wants to raise the child alone.
128	6	"Halloween V"	Gail Mancuso	Betsy Borns and Miriam Trogdon	October 26, 1993	704	34.5
Nancy thinks Dan dislikes her, and Roseanne soon realizes she is right. Darlene and David scheme to terrify Roseanne on Halloween.
129	7	"Homeward Bound"	Philip Charles MacKenzie	Michael Borkow	November 2, 1993	702	29.4
Darlene returns home and realizes how much David misses her. After Darlene leaves, David tells Roseanne and Dan that he is going to his mother's house in another town when in reality he moves in with Darlene in Chicago. Roseanne and Dan learn that D.J. has begun masturbating and struggle with how to handle it without embarrassing him.
130	8	"Guilt by Imagination"	Philip Charles MacKenzie	Story by : Lois Bromfield; Teleplay by : Pat Bullard and Stevie Ray Fromstein	November 9, 1993	708	28.6
Dan's old flame Phyllis Zimmer (mentioned in the Season 1 episode "The Memory Game") drops by the city garage and invites him to lunch. He tries keeping it from Roseanne, but she finds out. Vicki Lawrence appears in this episode.
131	9	"Homecoming"	Gail Mancuso	Sid Youngers	November 16, 1993	709	33.0
When Becky and Mark return for a visit, Roseanne, seeing them drifting apart, schemes to break the couple up for good, but realizes Mark may not be the problem. Dan's 20th high-school football-team anniversary celebration is being held at the Conner house. Note: This episode marks the first appearance of Sarah Chalke as Becky, Lecy Goranson's replacement.
132	10	"Thanksgiving '93"	Philip Charles MacKenzie	Michael Borkow and Mike Gandolfi	November 23, 1993	710	28.0
At Thanksgiving, Nana Mary embarrasses a heavily pregnant Jackie and also reveals a secret about Bev's marriage; Becky prepares the holiday feast and Dan and Mark squabble.
133	11	"The Driver's Seat"	Philip Charles MacKenzie	James Berg and Stan Zimmerman	November 30, 1993	711	29.3
Nancy and Jackie cast aside Roseanne's suspicions that Leon is usurping her position at the Lunch Box but ultimately are proven to be true. D.J. joy rides in Roseanne's car and wrecks it; her violent reaction has her questioning whether she is repeating her father's pattern of childhood abuse.
134	12	"White Trash Christmas"	Philip Charles MacKenzie	Lawrence Broch and William Lucas Walker	December 14, 1993	712	31.4
Roseanne and Dan go all out for Christmas in indignant reaction to their neighborhood association's imposed limits on exterior decorations after the Conners' previous tacky efforts. Roseanne and Dan are angry that the money they earmarked for Becky's education is instead used to pay for Mark's trade school tuition. Becky further annoys them by taking a job as a skimpily-clad waitress at "Bunz" (very obviously patterned after "Hooters"). When Bev and D.J. visit Darlene in Chicago, D.J. discovers David is living there with his sister, forcing Darlene to use all her savings to keep him quiet.
135	13	"Suck Up or Shut Up"	Philip Charles MacKenzie	Story by : Amy Morland; Teleplay by : Betsy Borns and Mike Gandolfi	January 4, 1994	713	32.3
Leon pushes Roseanne to join a women's business association so she can network to help the diner. Roseanne presses D.J. to befriend the offbeat son of one of the association's members (Florence Henderson). Dan discovers Mark has dropped out of trade school when he catches him hanging out at the Lobo.
136	14	"Busted"	Philip Charles MacKenzie	Amy Sherman	January 11, 1994	714	31.6
Mark thinks he is a failure and leaves Becky. She blames Roseanne for making her push Mark to go to school. In Chicago, Darlene and David's relationship is becoming strained from being together all the time. When Roseanne visits Mark, who is staying with Roy (Ahmet Zappa) Roy accidentally lets slip that David and Darlene are living together in Chicago. Mark drives Roseanne to Chicago to bring David back; Roseanne hides the truth from Dan.
137	15	"David vs. Goliath"	Philip Charles MacKenzie	Steve Pepoon	February 1, 1994	716	28.8
Roseanne blackmails David into being her live-in "maid" in exchange for saying nothing to Dan about him living with Darlene. However, David feels guilty and confesses the truth to Dan, who then angrily throws him out; Roseanne persuades pregnant Jackie to temporarily take David in. Becky wants Dan to hire Mark for a job at the city garage. Jackie refuses any help from Fred for the baby, forcing him to secretly slip cash into her tip jar.
138	16	"Everyone Comes to Jackie's"	Philip Charles MacKenzie	Betsy Borns and Mike Gandolfi	February 8, 1994	715	32.5
Jackie's house buzzes with activity as Roseanne hides David from Dan who, in the heat of anger over David's duplicity, suggests that Fred should sue Jackie for custody of their baby. Darlene returns to make peace, only to find that Dan blames David for the entire situation. David is allowed back to the Conner house.
139	17	"Don't Make Room for Daddy"	Philip Charles MacKenzie	Kevin Abbott and Stevie Ray Fromstein	February 15, 1994	717	25.2
Fred sues Jackie for custody of their unborn baby, upsetting her when served with the papers. Dan tries to cover up that the lawsuit was his suggestion. Even when Fred is willing to drop the lawsuit, Jackie mistrusts him, thinking it a ploy to get together with her. Roseanne derides Jackie, saying not all men are like Fisher or their father, who both hurt her, and that her hatred towards men will only hurt her more. Jackie reconsiders and she and Fred end up together.
140	18	"Don't Ask, Don't Tell"	Philip Charles MacKenzie	Story by : Michael Borkow; Teleplay by : James Berg and Stan Zimmerman	March 1, 1994	718	31.8
Roseanne is the life of the party at a gay bar until Nancy's girlfriend kisses her. One of Becky's old boyfriends gives Mark a reason to distrust her.
141	19	"Labor Day"	Philip Charles MacKenzie	Story by : Rob Ulin; Teleplay by : Miriam Trogdon	March 8, 1994	719	35.0
Roseanne is upset that Jackie wants Fred in the delivery room rather than her. But she is the one who is there when the contractions start, having delayed contacting Fred, who barely makes it to the hospital in time. Jackie gives birth to a son she names Andy.
142	20	"Past Imperfect"	Philip Charles MacKenzie	David Raether	March 22, 1994	720	29.1
When Dan's father misses an alimony payment to Audrey, Dan's mother, Dan wants to give her money. though Roseanne does not. Fred quizzes Jackie about her sexual history, then regrets asking.
143	21	"Lies My Father Told Me"	Philip Charles MacKenzie	Story by : Rob Ulin; Teleplay by : Eric Gilliland	March 29, 1994	721	33.6
Roseanne helps Dan cope with life-altering news: his mother has a long history of mental illness and psychiatric-hospital stays that he never knew about. Ed allowed Dan to grow up believing her imbalance was Ed's fault, making his mother look good in Dan's eyes. Dan grapples with accepting that Ed was not the bad father he believed him to be.
144	22	"I Pray the Lord My Stove to Keep"	Philip Charles MacKenzie	Kevin Abbott and Pat Bullard	May 3, 1994	722	23.3
D.J. has secretly been attending church (saying he was spending that time with a friend). He then gives Roseanne grief about morals when she wants to keep an extra stove that was delivered to the diner in error. Jesco White makes a cameo appearance, clogg dancing during the end credits.
145	23	"Body by Jake"	Philip Charles MacKenzie	David Forbes	May 10, 1994	723	28.2
When Bev breaks her pelvis at the retirement home, she claims she fell in the shower but Roseanne discovers the real story is far more embarrassing. Fred pops the question to Jackie.
146	24	"Isn't It Romantic?"	Gail Mancuso	Story by : Timothy Schlattmann and Perry Dance; Teleplay by : Leif Sandaas and Cynthia Hogle	May 17, 1994	724	25.3
Mark and David struggle with the concept of feminism while also using it to curry favor with their partners. Fred seeks Roseanne's advice on proposing to Jackie, then studies Jackie's favorite soap opera for tips. Roseanne demands passion from Dan, but turns to fantasy instead.
147	25	"Altar Egos"	Mark K. Samuels	Rob Ulin and Eric Gilliland	May 24, 1994	725	28.1
Fred considers calling off the wedding because he thinks Jackie has a crush on Dan. When Fred realizes he is wrong, he begs Jackie to marry him. Fred and Jackie are married in the Conners' living room.

=== Season 7 (1994–95) ===
Note: Due to a timeslot shift by ABC of Home Improvement to Tuesdays at 9:00 p.m., which was a reaction to NBC's move of Frasier to Tuesdays at 9:00 p.m., Roseanne was moved to Wednesdays at 9:00 p.m. for this season.

Roseanne, season 7 episodes
No. overall	No. in season	Title	Directed by	Written by	Original release date	Prod. code	US viewers (millions)
148	1	"Nine Is Enough"	Gail Mancuso	Story by : Rob Ulin; Teleplay by : Stevie Ray Fromstein and Pat Bullard	September 21, 1994	803	28.9
Dan is fed up having so many people living in the house and wants Becky and Mark to move out. Roseanne agrees until Becky says she and Mark are trying to get pregnant. Fred rebels against Jackie overly protecting baby Andy. After a fight, she and the baby go to Roseanne's. When everyone learns that Dan shaved his armpits (due to a cyst) Dan, embarrassed, storms off to stay with Fred. Jackie and Fred make up, and Roseanne tells Dan she has given Becky and Mark until May to move out, then announces she is pregnant.
149	2	"Two for One"	Gail Mancuso	Stephen Godchaux	September 28, 1994	801	28.6
Jackie spots Darlene's car at a motel and tells Roseanne, who thinks Darlene and David broke their abstinence promise. Roseanne is shocked that Darlene was actually at the motel with a guy named Jimmy; Darlene says that David accepts her having another relationship. When David later gives Darlene an ultimatum about Jimmy, she chooses Jimmy, and they break-up. Dan reveals his fears about having another baby to Jackie; she reassures him by saying he always reacts this way and urges him to talk to Roseanne. When Dan shares his feelings to Roseanne, she lashes out but later tells Jackie she is also scared. Jackie convinces her to confide in Dan. She tries, but ends up comforting Dan like always.
150	3	"Snoop Davey Dave"	Gail Mancuso	Elaine Aronson	October 5, 1994	802	25.4
David is devastated after breaking-up with Darlene. Roseanne encourages him to move on, but to retaliate he tells Roseanne about Darlene having used drugs. Roseanne and Dan confront Darlene when she comes home, though she initially denies it; David confirms she did and feels she will again. Roseanne is furious and refuses to allow Darlene to return to college. Darlene says she was only experimenting and will never do it again, but Roseanne is adamant she stay home until realizing David's intent is to keep Darlene there for his own selfish reasons. Though she cannot fully trust Darlene, Roseanne lets her return to school.
151	4	"Girl Talk"	Gail Mancuso	Miriam Trogdon	October 12, 1994	804	26.8
Becky and Mark are arguing constantly and Roseanne finds out from Jackie that Mark has been uninterested in sex. Jackie tells Roseanne about her own sexual problems with Fred while Roseanne confides about Dan's unusual attempts to get her in the mood. Roseanne encourages David to get out and meet girls but he is uninterested. Fred initiates an open discussion with Dan and Mark about their sex lives but all three end up knowing too much. Roseanne talks to Becky about Mark, and is surprised Becky has been confiding to David about her marital woes.
152	5	"Sleeper"	Gail Mancuso	Tim Doyle	October 19, 1994	806	26.9
David considers moving out after Becky discovers he had a sex dream that she thinks it is about her. When D.J. tells Mark about it, Mark confronts David who admits the dream was about Roseanne. Roseanne is at first upset until Dan admits he had a similar dream about Bev when he and Roseanne started dating. David tells Roseanne he considers her a mother figure, and Roseanne believes the dream was about his desire for affection. Becky seems disappointed when Roseanne tells her about David, and admits she is confused about her feelings for him.
153	6	"Skeleton in the Closet"	Gail Mancuso	Story by : Lois Bromfield; Teleplay by : William Lucas Walker and Lawrence Broch	October 26, 1994	807	29.7
Fred is annoyed by Leon's overly friendly attention toward him, leading Nancy and Leon to think that Fred "doth protest too much." At Leon's Halloween party, when Leon's gay friends seem well acquainted with Fred, Roseanne becomes convinced that Fred is secretly gay, later getting an unexpected surprise. Roseanne thinks Bev is bald after Jackie points out a wig at Bev's hair salon that looks exactly like their mother's hair and says she fears they may go bald. All were pranks on Roseanne, but she gets the ultimate revenge.
154	7	"Follow the Son"	Gail Mancuso	Dusty Kay	November 2, 1994	809	25.9
Darlene refuses to allow D.J. to quit his Lunch Box busboy job until he starts spilling secrets about Roseanne's lazy work habits to Leon. David starts dating again, but is upset when Mark reveals that Darlene and Jimmy may be moving in together. David goes to Chicago to spy on Darlene and Jimmy (Danny Masterson). He poses as a peer counselor named "Craig" and tells Jimmy that Darlene has serious mental health issues. Roseanne schemes to get D.J. back to the Lunch Box. Dan has since hired D.J. to work at the city garage, but Roseanne says she wanted time with her son before he gets too old and drifts away. D.J. is unhappy to return to the Lunch Box until he sees the sexy new busgirl, Staci (Traci Lords). Darlene is furious to learn that "Craig" is David.
155	8	"Punch and Jimmy"	Gail Mancuso	David Raether	November 9, 1994	805	27.4
D.J, is being bullied at school and Dan offers to teach him how to fight. D.J.'s own patent fight move mostly involves falling to the ground in the fetal position. David wants Dan to teach him how to fight, but Roseanne thinks he only wants to impress Darlene, because Jimmy (Danny Masterson) is a boxer. She wants Dan to encourage David to feel good about himself, which Dan struggles with. Jackie and Roseanne head to Chicago to meet Jimmy. Roseanne dislikes Jimmy, and tells Jackie she wants David and Darlene back together. When D.J. beats up David, Dan tries to comfort David and discovers David actually was trying to bond with Dan through shared interests.
156	9	"White Men Can't Kiss"	Gail Mancuso	Rob Ulin and Kevin Abbott	November 16, 1994	808	24.9
Jackie baffled that Fred enjoys spending time in Bev's company. D.J. refuses to kiss a girl named Geena for a school play. His teacher tells Roseanne it is because Geena is black. Roseanne confronts D.J. and tells him he has to kiss her. When he refuses, Dan supports his decision. After an argument with Chuck (James Pickens, Jr.), Dan questions his own bigotry and tells D.J. he has to kiss Geena. Roseanne confronts her own bigotry when a man arrives the Lunchbox at closing time. Roseanne refuses to let him in until he identifies himself as Geena's father. He angrily confronts Roseanne, and leaves her wondering if she feared letting him in because he was a man or because he was black. Note: In the Conners, years later, D.J. is married to Geena.
157	10	"Thanksgiving '94"	Gail Mancuso	Miriam Trogdon and Lois Bromfield	November 23, 1994	810	20.8
During the Thanksgiving feast, Roseanne receives potentially alarming news about her pregnancy that she is unable to confirm with the prenatal clinic. As she and Dan consider their options if something is wrong, friction erupts between them. Nana Mary, with a feeble new husband on her arm, upsets Bev by discussing the two abortions she had long ago.
158	11	"Maybe Baby"	Gail Mancuso	Story by : Cynthia Mort; Teleplay by : Matt Berry and Ed Yeager	November 30, 1994	811	25.4
As Roseanne and Dan anxiously await the results about her pregnancy, D.J. steps up and offers to help with whatever is needed. The doctor calls with good news, but the celebration is dimmed by another fight.
159	12	"The Parenting Trap"	Gail Mancuso	Sid Youngers	December 14, 1994	812	24.1
D.J.'s teacher informs Dan and Roseanne that he is having difficulties at school. They fight over who should handle the problem, causing to Dan feel Roseanne does not respect his parenting skills. Mark finally tells Dan that that D.J. has begun having erections in class and is too embarrassed to solve math problems in front of the class. Dan advises D.J. on what to do. But Roseanne is dissatisfied with his solution though her own attempt sends D.J. screaming from the room and validates Dan's parenting skills.
160	13	"Rear Window"	Gail Mancuso	Michael Borkow and Danny Zuker	January 4, 1995	813	27.3
Dan and Roseanne confront the elderly nudist couple next door about leaving their windows uncovered, but they accuse the Conners as being the perverted ones for spying on them and threaten to plant a hedge. David's coffee-time with Becky worries Mark, so he enlists Darlene's help, much to her surprise.
161	14	"My Name is Bev"	Gail Mancuso	Bob Nickman	January 11, 1995	814	25.2
After being arrested for drunk-driving, Bev is forced to attend an AA meeting during which she realizes she is an alcoholic. When she shows up at Dan's Super Bowl XXIX party, Roseanne wants the guests to hide the keg. This proves catastrophic.
162	15	"Bed and Bored"	Gail Mancuso	Eric Gilliland	February 1, 1995	817	22.3
Roseanne, tired out by her pregnancy, lies about the doctor putting her on total bedrest so everyone will wait on her. David discovers her deception, and Jackie confronts Bev about her terrible mothering.
163	16	"Sisters"	Gail Mancuso	Michael Borkow	February 8, 1995	815	21.1
Fred becomes annoyed when D.J. spends too much time hanging out at their house and wants Jackie to talk to Roseanne. Jackie confronts Roseanne about it, wanting to avoid conflict with Fred, only to walk into it with her sister. Jackie emphasizes she loves her nephew, and D.J. explains he just wants to be a big brother to baby Andy because they are the only boys. Meanwhile, Dan plans Roseanne's birthday celebration with their daughters.
164	17	"Lost Youth"	Gail Mancuso	Pat Bullard and Stevie Ray Fromstein	February 15, 1995	818	22.7
David wants to date Stacy (Traci Lords), the Lunch Box bus girl, but Mark risks his marriage by putting the moves on her solely to annoy David. Jackie confronts Fred about their predictable sex life, which is just what he likes.
165	18	"Single Married Female"	Gail Mancuso	Betsy Borns	February 22, 1995	819	22.4
Jackie spends time, though not romantically, with a man Stacy dated. Dan sees them at the Lobo and confronts Jackie, saying if she does not tell Fred what she is doing, then it amounts to cheating. Jackie realizes her behavior is leading up to having an affair. She tells Fred, who already knows, and he leaves her.
166	19	"All About Rosey"	Gail Mancuso	Story by : Rob Ulin and Leif Sandass; Teleplay by : Rob Ulin and Perry Dance	March 1, 1995	816A	20.1
167	20	"All About Rosey"	Gail Mancuso	Story by : Rob Ulin and Leif Sandass; Teleplay by : Rob Ulin and Perry Dance	March 1, 1995	816B	20.1
In the first part of this one-hour clip show special, a young Roseanne and Jackie go to a fortuneteller to learn their futures. They find Jackie taking an adult, autistic D.J. to a psychiatrist. In the second half, classic sitcom moms point the parenting finger at Rosey.
168	21	"Husbands and Wives"	Gail Mancuso	Kevin Abbott	March 22, 1995	820	22.1
Roseanne and Dan enlist D.J.'s help to get Darlene to cut her own allowance. Fred and Jackie are back together, but their marital woes escalate.
169	22	"Happy Trailers"	Mark K. Samuels	Tim Doyle and Sid Youngers	March 29, 1995	821	20.4
Becky and Mark move into a tacky trailer park, which Mark calls a 'mobile home community', where they are greeted by a tipsy neighbor (Sharon Stone). When Dan and Roseanne offer to help fix up the trailer, they refuse, wanting to do everything themselves.
170	23	"The Blaming of the Shrew"	Gail Mancuso	Lawrence Broch	May 3, 1995	823	16.5
D.J.'s new girlfriend (Ashley Johnson), who Roseanne likes, bosses him around, which causes problems with their relationship at school. In an effort to save their relationship, Jackie and Fred see a marriage counselor (Ellen DeGeneres) about their anger issues.
171	24	"The Birds and the Frozen Bees"	Gail Mancuso	David Forbes	May 10, 1995	822	17.4
When a girl that David likes accepts a date with him, Roseanne schemes to get him back with Darlene; the two reconcile after much poking and prodding.
172	25	"Couch Potatoes"	Mark K. Samuels	Eric Gilliland	May 17, 1995	825	17.2
The Conners are chosen as a Nielsen family, prompting Roseanne to only allow the family to watch PBS. Roseanne's nesting instincts disrupt the family routine. Jackie and Fred's marriage comes to an end.
173	26	"Sherwood Schwartz: A Loving Tribute"	Gail Mancuso	Story by : William Lucas Walker and Allan Stephan; Teleplay by : William Lucas Walker	May 24, 1995	824	16.3
Roseanne encourages Dan to go back to working on the boat he is building in the garage, bringing on a massive Gilligan's Island fantasy, transforming family members into the sitcom's characters. During the end credits, the original cast of Gilligan's Island switches roles with the Roseanne cast: Tina Louise as Roseanne, Bob Denver as Jackie, Dawn Wells as Darlene, and Russell Johnson as Mark, with Sherwood Schwartz appearing as himself.

=== Season 8 (1995–96) ===
Note: Starting with this season (and the rest of the series), Roseanne was moved back to Tuesdays, but to 8:00 p.m. instead of the original 9:00 p.m.

Roseanne, season 8 episodes
No. overall	No. in season	Title	Directed by	Written by	Original release date	Prod. code	US viewers (millions)
174	1	"Shower the People You Love with Stuff"	Gail Mancuso	Lawrence Broch	September 19, 1995	901	22.5
Becky and Darlene feud over Roseanne's baby shower when Darlene slacks off, leaving Becky doing most of the work. Roseanne wants to return baby shower gifts to have enough cash to buy a crib, though she is disappointed by what she is given. Note: This episode marks Lecy Goranson's return to the series as Becky.
175	2	"Let Them Eat Junk"	Gail Mancuso	Story by : Carrie Snow; Teleplay by : Matt Berry and Ed Yeager	September 26, 1995	902	19.0
Jackie has a bee in her bonnet over Roseanne feeding Andy junkfood. Dan is upset because D.J.'s image of him includes a can of beer.
176	3	"Roseanne in the Hood"	Mark K. Samuels	Story by : Allan Stephan; Teleplay by : Mike Costa and Drew Ogier	October 17, 1995	904	19.7
When a new, classier restaurant opens opposite the Lunch Box, Roseanne declares war. Pat Harrington, Jr. appears in this episode.
177	4	"The Last Date"	Gail Mancuso	Eric Gilliland and Daniel Palladino	October 24, 1995	905	20.5
The temptation to crash a stranger's bar mitzvah at a local hotel is too much for Roseanne to resist as she drags Dan out on the town for a "last hurrah" before the baby is born.
178	5	"Halloween: the Final Chapter"	Roseanne	Roseanne and Lois Bromfield	October 31, 1995	906	18.8
On Halloween, Roseanne reigns as "Queen of the Gypsies, consort of wizards and seer of souls." A Ouija board sends a message from "The Dead" that portends an unexpected event: Roseanne goes into labor. She delivers a baby boy she names Jerry Garcia Conner.
179	6	"The Fifties Show"	Gail Mancuso	Allan Stephan Blasband	November 7, 1995	907	17.8
The Conners find themselves going back in time in this spoof of 1950s sitcoms (shot mostly in black and white): Roseanne is a devoted housewife who selflessly guides her family, Dan is a hapless businessman stewing over "the Anderson account", and Jackie is the wacky neighbor with a secret agenda.
180	7	"The Getaway, Almost"	Gail Mancuso	Cynthia Mort	November 14, 1995	908	20.8
Jackie and Roseanne's shopping trip with Jerry turns into a version of Thelma & Louise when they pick up a rebel teenage hitchhiker and run a trucker off the road. Jenna Elfman appears as the hitchhiker.
181	8	"The Last Thursday in November"	Gail Mancuso	Ritch Shydner	November 21, 1995	909	17.9
When DJ's teacher gives his students free rein, the class Thanksgiving pageant takes on a decidedly modern, Pulp Fiction twist that offends many parents, but not the Conners. Roseanne invites some new Native American friends over for Thanksgiving, and they celebrate the holiday their way.
182	9	"Of Mice and Dan"	Gail Mancuso	Bob Nickman	November 28, 1995	910	16.4
Dan's old bandmate, Stingray Wilson (John Popper) rolls into Lanford to perform a concert, giving Dan a dose of regret, infused with a tad of depression. Roseanne talks Stingray into giving Dan a little stage time, which he fully enjoys.
183	10	"Direct to Video"	Gail Mancuso	Michael B. Kaplan	December 5, 1995	903	18.9
While Roseanne narrates a video time capsule for her unborn child, Becky and Darlene find Dan and Roseanne's old love letters. D.J. gets upset when he learns his parents never filled out his baby book, and Mark cooks up a 'special' dinner for the Conner clan. Note: This episode marks the final appearance of Michael O'Keefe as Fred, Jackie's ex-husband.
184	11	"December Bride"	Gail Mancuso	William Lucas Walker	December 12, 1995	911	21.1
Scott and Leon have trouble planning their wedding until Roseanne offers to take over for free. Leon's cold feet and self-doubt about his sexuality factor into the planning.
185	12	"The Thrilla Near the Vanilla Extract"	Gail Mancuso	Ed Yeager	January 2, 1996	912	19.3
Jackie realizes her hidden talent as a supermarket samples person as she and Roseanne take jobs at a grocery store. The sisters quickly become competitive. Meanwhile, Dan and David fight over Mark being D.J.'s role model.
186	13	"The White Sheep of the Family"	Gail Mancuso	David Raether	January 9, 1996	913	20.8
After the Conners receive a small inheritance from Great-Aunt Harriet, they decide to go out for a nice dinner, with their spending limits firmly set until Darlene unexpectedly pops in and wants to join them. Meanwhile, D.J. contemplates how to spend his $500 inheritance. Darlene alienates the family by hurling insults until they bite back. Darlene further upsets everyone by having turned down a good-paying job so she can finish college. D.J. uses part of his inheritance to buy a trombone and impress a girl in the school band.
187	14	"Becky Howser, M.D."	Gail Mancuso	Sid Youngers	January 16, 1996	914	17.6
Mark tries cheering up a depressed Becky by inviting family and friends over for a surprise get-together. Roseanne talks to Becky as the party does little to lift her spirits. Becky admits to wanting more out of life, which Roseanne supports, but is unaware that Becky's plans could hurt her marriage when Mark is left out of the decision.
188	15	"Out of the Past"	Gail Mancuso	Drew Ogier and Mike Costa	February 6, 1996	915	17.4
While Nana Mary amuses Roseanne and Jackie with a box of their childhood treasures, they take a walk down memory lane, discovering that Roseanne was always the queen to Jackie's minion status. Jackie finds her long-lost doll, "Mrs. Tuttle," that she thought had been 'doll-napped'. Roseanne tries to pin the disappearance on a napping Nana Mary, but Nana Mary reveals the truth.
189	16	"Construction Junction"	Gail Mancuso	Daniel Palladino	February 13, 1996	916	14.2
When Chuck and Bob show up with a great new construction prospect for the old dry wall crew, Dan must decide between keeping his secure but boring job at the garage or making a bid on the lucrative project. Meanwhile, Jackie gets hooked up to the Internet: her initial reluctance quickly vanishes and David soon needs to intervene as Jackie becomes addicted.
190	17	"We're Going to Disney World"	Gail Mancuso	Matt Berry	February 20, 1996	917	17.8
The family goes hog-wild with excitement as they plan to travel to Disney World with Dan's severance payout from the Lanford City Garage.
191	18	"Disney World War II"	Gail Mancuso	Allan Stephan Blasband	February 27, 1996	918	19.6
Fireworks and fanfare accompany the Conners on a whirlwind tour of the magical kingdom of Disney World. Darlene becomes practically euphoric upon meeting Winnie the Pooh.
192	19	"Springtime for David"	Mark K. Samuels	Garland Testa and David Forbes	March 12, 1996	919	16.9
David finally moves out and lands a job at a second-rate theme park in Lanford. During training, he becomes transformed into an eerily smiling automaton. The episode's name is a reference to Springtime for Hitler, a musical play within the Broadway musical, "The Producers." The episode itself is a satire of the Walt Disney Company, who, after having recently acquired the American Broadcasting Company (ABC), required the network's shows (including Roseanne) to film and air Disney-themed episodes, including the preceding episodes "We're Going to Disney World" and "Disney World War II".
193	20	"Another Mouth to Shut Up"	Mark K. Samuels	Story by : Eric Gilliland; Teleplay by : Janet Leahy and Richard Kaplan	March 26, 1996	920	21.4
Just weeks after their hot night in Disney World, Darlene proposes to David and announces that she is pregnant.
194	21	"Morning Becomes Obnoxious"	Gail Mancuso	Leif Sandaas	April 9, 1996	921	15.6
After an impromptu TV interview at the diner goes spectacularly well, Roseanne prepares to "Wake Up Chicago" on a morning TV talk show (with Jackie as her manager) as a news commentator with a unique and "opinionated blue-collar outlook". Meanwhile, David plans for his and Darlene's wedding, but offends Bev as well.
195	22	"Ballroom Blitz"	Gail Mancuso	Story by : Cathy Ladman; Teleplay by : Cathy Ladman and Carrie Snow	April 30, 1996	922	14.2
Bev's smitten with her passionate ballroom-dance instructor, but becomes angry when he flirts with the newly-divorced Jackie.
196	23	"The Wedding"	Gail Mancuso	Michael B. Kaplan and Lawrence Broch	May 7, 1996	923	23.0
Darlene and David's outdoor wedding ends with Dan having a heart attack.
197	24	"Heart & Soul"	Gail Mancuso	Daniel Palladino and William Lucas Walker	May 14, 1996	924	21.0
Roseanne tries in vain to be cool at the hospital. Dan learns that D.J. performed CPR on him, saving his life. Dan's hospital room is the venue for Darlene and David's scaled-down wedding reception. Note: This episode marks the final appearance of Lecy Goranson as Becky in the show's original run.
198	25	"Fights and Stuff"	Mark K. Samuels	Story by : Eric Gilliland; Teleplay by : Cynthia Mort and Sid Youngers	May 21, 1996	925	18.8
Dan returns home to a strict diet and exercise regimen that he soon violates behind Roseanne's back. When Roseanne finds out, it leads to a huge argument, unleashing old resentments, resulting in them trashing the house over their suppressed anger. When Roseanne walks out, her and Dan's marriage may collapse.

=== Season 9 (1996–97) ===
Roseanne, season 9 episodes
No. overall	No. in season	Title	Directed by	Written by	Original release date	Prod. code	US viewers (millions)
199	1	"Call Waiting"	Mark K. Samuels	Drew Ogier and Allan Stephan Blasband	September 17, 1996	1001	18.9
Regretting breaking his diet and fighting with Roseanne, Dan fixes the house after the huge fight and leaves a ton of messages on Jackie's answering machine. Roseanne finds herself in front of Jackie's TV, watching notable past sitcoms like That Girl, I Dream of Jeannie, and The Mary Tyler Moore Show (Cameo appearance by Ed Asner on the latter show), eventually finding her and Dan playing the roles of Ann and Don, Mary and Lou Grant, and Jeannie and Tony. Later, Jackie convinces Roseanne that Dan and Roseanne were meant for each other and, when she is finally alone with Andy and Jerry, makes a shocking discovery about her lottery ticket after watching the lottery drawings on TV.
200	2	"Millions from Heaven"	Mark K. Samuels	Nancy Steen and Cynthia Mort	September 24, 1996	1002	17.6
The lottery ticket mentioned in the last episode is a winner. The Conners, and also Jackie, have won $108 million. Amid the press bombardment, the family ponders what to do with all that money.
201	3	"What a Day for a Daydream"	Mark K. Samuels	Richard Kaplan and Garland Testa	October 1, 1996	1003	18.63
With a full dinner table and a home-cooked meal, Roseanne daydreams about the lottery winnings; from a riot on the Jerry Springer Show to a glamorous photo shoot with Jackie and Hugh Hefner.
202	4	"Honor Thy Mother"	Mark K. Samuels	Bob Nickman and Amy Welsh	October 8, 1996	1004	16.9
Dan announces that he is going to visit his mother, who is in a mental hospital in California. Jackie and Roseanne wait out the Conner house's renovation at a spa.
203	5	"Someday My Prince Will Come"	Mark K. Samuels	Carrie Snow and Janet Leahy	October 15, 1996	1005	15.7
Prince Carlos Charmaine (Jim Varney) from Moldavia, visits Jackie, with whom he is enamored after seeing her on television. Roseanne warns Jackie to remain distant, until Leon discovers that he is really a prince. The family are invited on a trip to New York with Leon in place of Dan, who is still in California.
204	6	"Pampered to a Pulp"	Mark K. Samuels	Stacie Lipp	October 22, 1996	1006	15.3
Roseanne and Jackie's spa trip subjects them to a strict diet, acid peels, skin toxins, and exhausting hikes. Tammy Faye Messner appears in this episode.
205	7	"Satan, Darling"	Roseanne	Story by : Roseanne and Ellen Quigley; Teleplay by : Roseanne and Jennifer Saunders	October 29, 1996	1007	17.7
Roseanne, Jackie, and Nancy visit New York City's Upper West Side, where they meet celebrities and are invited to Martha's Vineyard by a woman named Astrid Wentworth. After getting drunk with Edina Monsoon (Jennifer Saunders) and Patsy Stone (Joanna Lumley) of Absolutely Fabulous, Roseanne has a Rosemary's Baby-parody nightmare of Darlene giving birth to Satan.
206	8	"Hoi Polloi Meets Hoiti Toiti"	Mark K. Samuels	Leif Sandaas and Debbie Kasper	November 12, 1996	1008	13.3
Roseanne, Jackie, DJ, Mark, Bev, Becky, Andy, and Jerry go to the Wentworth estate to meet Astrid's family, who are unimpressed by Roseanne's trashy ways. When she finds the family's stash of "happy pills," Roseanne teaches them to scream out their anger. Dana Gould appears in this episode.
207	9	"Roseambo"	Gary Halvorson	R. Gaylor and Betsy Salkind	November 19, 1996	1009	19.0
In a parody of Under Siege 2: Dark Territory (starring Steven Seagal), Roseanne meets First Lady Hillary Clinton (Teresa Barnwell), after saving her family and Dr. Bakshmi from women-hating terrorists on a train to Washington D.C. Steven Seagal himself appears in this episode.
208	10	"Home Is Where the Afghan Is"	Gary Halvorson	Lawrence Broch	November 26, 1996	1010	15.0
Roseanne, Jackie, and the family finally arrive home after all the excitement. Roseanne is disappointed that Dan has not returned from California yet. The family's Thanksgiving dinner is being catered, so Roseanne and Jackie open the Lunch Box as a soup kitchen. Bev reveals more than she intended during the Thanksgiving feast and realizes she is gay.
209	11	"Mothers and Other Strangers"	Gary Halvorson	Roseanne and Cynthia Mort	December 3, 1996	1011	15.4
While Dan is in California, Roseanne worries how he will react to all the changes she has made to the house. Elsewhere, Bev seeks answers from her free-spirited mother, Mary, who finally mends her relationship with her daughter. Note: This episode marks the final appearance of Shelley Winters as Nana Mary, Roseanne and Jackie's grandmother.
210	12	"Home for the Holidays"	Mark K. Samuels	Story by : Roseanne; Teleplay by : Lawrence Broch	December 17, 1996	1012	14.6
After two months in California, Dan returns home for Christmas though he seems distracted and treats Roseanne coolly. Jackie later overhears Dan having an intimate conversation on the phone with another woman.
211	13	"Say It Ain't So"	Mark K. Samuels	Nancy Steen	January 7, 1997	1013	18.13
Jackie confronts Dan, who admits to having a relationship with his mother's nurse. She insists he tell Roseanne or else she will. Roseanne tells Jackie that Prince Carlos has married his maid. D.J. wants to film Darlene giving birth. Darlene says no, but David likes the idea. While watching Darlene and David's friends' birth video, D.J. faints. Dan finally confesses his affair to Roseanne. She kicks him out, though she is devastated.
212	14	"Hit the Road, Jack"	Mark K. Samuels	Roseanne	January 14, 1997	1014	18.79
A depressed Roseanne avoids Dan and drives around town eating fast food and listening to radio shows. She believes Dan had an affair because of her appearance. As Dan packs his bags to leave, he and D.J. have a falling out over Dan leaving. An angry D.J. goes to a video store and meets his soul mate, Heather (Heather Matarazzo). Dan is about to return to California, but cancels his flight and checks into a motel.
213	15	"The War Room"	Mark K. Samuels	Bob Nickman	January 28, 1997	1015	16.33
A depressed Roseanne locks herself and Jerry in her bedroom, soothing her sorrow with junk foods, trashy magazines, and TV. Friends and family stage an intervention in an attempt to entice her out, but ultimately fail. Mark finally succeeds by saying Dan not having left town means he wants her back.
214	16	"Lanford's Elite"	Gary Halvorson	Story by : Allan Stephan Blasband; Teleplay by : Richard Whitley and Bob Rubin	February 11, 1997	1016	13.49
Roseanne and Jackie attend an exquisite luncheon at the Lanford Country Club where they discuss politics and other topics with Lanford's elite. Roseanne meets Edgar Wellman (James Brolin), whose late father owned Wellman's Plastics where Roseanne and Jackie once worked. Edgar seeks Roseanne's financial help to keep Wellman Plastics open.
215	17	"Some Enchanted Merger"	Gary Halvorson	April Winchell	February 11, 1997	1017	13.49
Jackie believes that Roseanne and Edgar Wellman are an item. Though Roseanne says their relationship is purely business, she secretly wishes it was more. Jackie doubts Roseanne's claim. Roseanne fantasizes that the couple are from the movie Evita.
216	18	"A Second Chance"	Mark K. Samuels	Cynthia Mort	February 18, 1997	1018	16.26
Reluctant to leave town, Dan asks Jackie about Roseanne and Edgar Wellman's relationship, which Jackie confirms. Roseanne eventually agrees to see Dan. They reconcile, but receive a call from Jackie: Darlene has gone into premature labor and is being treated with a drug to stop her contractions.
217	19	"The Miracle"	Gary Halvorson	Story by : Roseanne; Teleplay by : Drew Ogier	February 25, 1997	1019	16.16
Darlene gives birth to a premature baby girl she names Harris Conner Healy. Roseanne consults with specialists from around the world, but what ultimately keeps the baby alive is Roseanne's own grandmotherly love and nurturing.
218	20	"Roseanne-Feld"	Mark K. Samuels	April Winchell and Richard Whitley	March 4, 1997	1020	13.98
Jackie and Mark attend a wrestling match, where Jackie ends up fighting the Black Widow (Dot Jones). D.J.'s first sexual experience looms and he consults Mark, who is unhelpful.
219	21	"The Truth Be Told"	Mark K. Samuels	Lawrence Broch and April Winchell	March 18, 1997	1021	12.90
Roseanne and Jackie learn that producers want to make a TV-movie about the Conners, but with distressingly drastic changes: gorgeous actors to play the Conners, fewer blue-collar plot twists, etc. Meanwhile, Bev, Leon, and Bev's friend Joyce naively reveal information about Roseanne's life to a tabloid reporter.
220	22	"Arsenic and Old Mom"	Mark K. Samuels	Carrie Fisher	May 13, 1997	1022	14.72
Dan's mother Audrey (now played by Debbie Reynolds, before played by Ann Wedgeworth in the 1989 Thanksgiving episode), visits unexpected. She tries to kill Dan for having put her in a mental hospital. Roseanne ends it all with a simple backyard battle.
221	23	"Into That Good Night"	Gary Halvorson	Story by : Roseanne; Teleplay by : Jessica Pentland & Jennifer Pentland	May 20, 1997	1023	16.57
222	24	"Into That Good Night"	Gary Halvorson	Roseanne and Allan Stephan Blasband	May 20, 1997	1024	16.57
Darlene and David bring baby Harris home. When Darlene wants to stay in the Conner nest, DJ begrudgingly moves to David's former space in the basement. When Mark and Becky visit baby Harris, it is revealed that they too are expecting though they keep it secret for now. Darlene worries about overstaying their welcome but Roseanne insists she wants them to stay. Leon and Scott announce they are adopting a little girl. In the first half, the family talks about life after winning the lottery. In a voice over, Roseanne reflects about her fictional life, revealing that the show itself has been her writing. While her book was based on her life, she changed details she disliked. For example: the Conners did not win the lottery; Dan died from his heart attack; Jackie—not Bev—was gay; and Mark and Darlene, and Becky and David, were the Conner-Healy couples. In the final moments, Roseanne discusses her depression after Dan's death and how it was Darlene's baby's nearly dying that snapped her back into reality. As the show fades to black, Phoebe Snow sings the show's theme song and Roseanne's trademark laugh is heard a final time.

=== Season 10 (2018) ===
Roseanne, season 10 episodes
No. overall	No. in season	Title	Directed by	Written by	Original release date	Prod. code	US viewers (millions)
223	1	"Twenty Years to Life"	John Pasquin	Bruce Rasmussen	March 27, 2018	1001	18.44
224	2	"Dress to Impress"	John Pasquin	Darlene Hunt	March 27, 2018	1003	18.44
225	3	"Roseanne Gets the Chair"	John Pasquin	Sid Youngers	April 3, 2018	1002	15.39
226	4	"Eggs Over, Not Easy"	John Pasquin	Morgan Murphy	April 10, 2018	1004	13.77
227	5	"Darlene v. David"	Gail Mancuso	Bruce Helford	April 17, 2018	1006	13.26
228	6	"No Country for Old Women"	Gail Mancuso	Dave Caplan	May 1, 2018	1009	10.42
229	7	"Go Cubs"	Andrew D. Weyman	Dave Caplan	May 8, 2018	1005	10.29
230	8	"Netflix & Pill"	Andrew D. Weyman	Betsy Borns	May 15, 2018	1007	10.73
231	9	"Knee Deep"	Gail Mancuso	Bruce Rasmussen	May 22, 2018	1008	10.58
