= Bubu =

Bubu or Bu Bu may refer to:

== Arts and entertainment ==
- Bubu music, a traditional Temne music of Sierra Leone
- Bubù (film), a 1971 Italian historical drama film
- Bubu, a 1970s Argentine rock band
- Bubu, a 2000s Romanian band who represented Romania in the Junior Eurovision Song Contest.

== People ==
- Bubu Mazibuko, South African actress
- Bubu Palo (born 1991), American basketball player nicknamed "Bubu"
- Ahmadu Hammadi Bubu (1776–1845), founder of the Massina Empire
- several kings of the Massina Empire
  - Bubu I (reigned 1544–1551)
  - Bubu II (reigned 1559–1583)
  - Bubu III (reigned 1603–1613)

== Other uses ==
- bubu, a traditional dance of Perak, Malaysia
- bubu, a type of fish trap
- Bubu, a brand name of PGO Scooters

== See also ==
- Al-bubu, a version of the boogeyman
- Boo Boo (disambiguation)
- Boubou (clothing), an African flowing garment
