= BO2 =

BO2 may refer to:

== Arts, entertainment, and media ==
- Blackout! 2, rap album by Method Man & Redman
  - BO2, first song of the Blackout! 2 album
- BO*2, MusiquePlus TV series by the Sckoropad Twins
- Call of Duty: Black Ops II, a 2012 first-person shooter game by Activision

== Other uses ==
- Bo.2, see List_of_aircraft_(B)#Borel
- Borate

== See also ==
- B_{2}O
- Bobo (disambiguation)
- Boo (disambiguation)
