= Boo language =

Boo language may refer to:

- Boo (programming language)
- Boo dialect, of the Teke-Ebo language
- Boko language (Benin), also called Boo language
- Bomu language, also called Boo, or Western Bobo Wule language
- Bozo language, ISO 639 code boo, spoken in Mali

== See also ==
- Boo (disambiguation)
