= Boo Boo =

Boo Boo or Booboo may refer to:

== People ==
- Boo Boo Davis (born 1943), American electric blues musician
- Booboo Stewart (born 1994), American singer, model, dancer and actor
- Alana "Honey Boo Boo" Thompson, star of the reality television show Here Comes Honey Boo Boo

== Arts and entertainment ==
- Boo-Boo Bear, a fictional cartoon character on The Huckleberry Hound Show and The Yogi Bear Show
- Boo Boo (album), the fifth studio album by Toro y Moi
- Boo-Boo, the debut EP from Boston band Big Dipper

== Other uses ==
- Boo Boo (dog), formerly the world's smallest dog

== See also ==
- Big Boo (disambiguation)
- Boo (disambiguation)
- Boubou (clothing), an African flowing garment
- Bubu (disambiguation)
