= H3adband =

American rapper (born 1995)

- Born: Jordan Randall; June 16, 1995 (age 31); Louisiana, U.S.
- Genres: Hip-hop
- Occupation: Rapper
- Years active: 2022–present
- Labels: WatchDatBaby; Hitmaker Distro

Jordan Randall (born June 16, 1995), known professionally as H3adband, is an American rapper from Baton Rouge, Louisiana. He was a former basketball player at Baton Rouge Community College, where he wore the jersey number 3. He began his musical career in 2022, with the release of his debut album Landlord. His 2025 song "Boo" went viral on the video-sharing platform, TikTok, and peaked at number 90 on Billboard's Hot 100.

In 2026, he signed with Tony Bucher's Hitmaker Music Group.

== Discography ==
=== Studio albums ===
Title	Album details
Landlord	Released: February 17, 2022; Label: WatchDatBaby, Hitmaker; Format: Digital download, streaming

=== Singles ===
Title	Year	Peak chart positions		Album
Title	Year	US	US R&B/HH	Album
"Boo"	2025	90	19	Non-album singles
"Stand on It"	2025	—	—	Non-album singles
"6-7"	2026	—	—	Non-album singles
"Shoulders (Remix)" (with 42brook/Pookielean)	2026	—	—	Non-album singles
"That's It"	2026	—	—	Non-album singles
"She Can Get It" (featuring DaBaby)	2026	—	—	Non-album singles
"Move Your Body"	2026	—	—	Non-album singles
"—" denotes a recording that did not chart or was not released in that territory.

=== Music videos ===
Title	Year	Director	Ref.
"Boo"	2025	Cali Kilo	
