= Big Boo =

Big Boo may refer to:

- Big Boo, a larger and stronger version of Boo in the Mario franchise
- Carrie "Big Boo" Black, a character in the television series Orange Is the New Black (2013)
- "Big Boo", a character in the television series Sunny Bunnies (2015)

== See also ==
- Boo (disambiguation)
- Big Bad Boo, Canadian production company
- Big Bam Boo, 1980s British pop/rock duo
- Boo Boo (disambiguation)
- "Bug a Boo" (song), a 1999 single by US pop group Destiny's Child
