= Boo (name) =

Boo is a given name, nickname and surname. It may refer to:

== People with the surname ==
- Ben Boo (1925–2021), American politician
- Bertil Boo (1914–1996), Swedish singer
- Boo Cheng Hau (born 1964), Malaysian politician
- Boo Junfeng (born 1983), Singaporean filmmaker
- Boo Seung-kwan (born 1998), South Korean member and main vocalist of boy group Seventeen
- Boo Soon-hee (born 1967), South Korean sport shooter
- Jim Boo (born 1954), American ice hockey player
- Karl Boo (1918–1996), Swedish politician
- Katherine Boo (born 1964), American journalist and MacArthur Fellow
- Kurt Boo, Swedish sprint canoer who competed in the late 1930s
- Prince Lee Boo (1764–1784), visitor to London from the Pelew Islands (now Palau)
- Sigrid Boo (1898–1953), Norwegian author

== People with the given name ==
- Boo Cook (born 1972), British comics artist
- Boo Kullberg (1889–1962), Swedish gymnast, member of the gold medal 1912 Olympics team
- Boo Saville (born 1980), British contemporary artist

== People with the nickname or stage name ==
- Boo Bradley (1972–2016), a stage name of American professional wrestler Jonathan Rechner also known as Balls Mahoney
- Orlando "Boo" Carter (born 2005), American football player
- Boo Ellis (1936–2010), American National Basketball Association player
- Boo Harvey (born 1966), American former college basketball player
- Boo Hewerdine (born 1961), British singer-songwriter
- Ronald "Boo" Hinkson, Saint Lucian jazz guitarist, co-founder of the Tru Tones in the 1960s
- Boo Jackson (born 1981), American retired basketball player
- Curley "Boo" Johnson (born 1965), former member of the Harlem Globetrotters
- Boo McLee (born 1983), American football player
- Boo Morcom (1921–2012), American track and field athlete, particularly in the pole vault
- Cristoval "Boo" Nieves (born 1994), American ice hockey player
- Boo Robinson (born 1987), American professional football defensive tackle
- Boo Weekley (born 1973), American golfer
- Boo Williams (born 1979), American retired National Football League wide receiver

== See also ==
- Boo (disambiguation)
