= Black Oxygen Organics =

Defunct multi-level marketing company

BlackOxygen Organics
- Industry: Multi-level marketing (MLM)
- Founded: 2015
- Founder: Marc Saint-Onge
- Defunct: November 23, 2021
- Website: blackoxygenorganics.com at the Wayback Machine (archived October 21, 2021)

Black Oxygen Organics was a Canadian multi-level marketing (MLM) company which sold dirt at a price of US$110 per package to customers in Canada and the United States.

== History ==
The company was founded in 2015 as NuWTR by Marc Saint-Onge, an evangelical Christian, conspiracy theorist, and entrepreneur from Casselman, Ontario, who has sold mud in various forms since the 1990s. Carlo Garibaldi served as President and Ron Montaruli served as vice president of business development.

Black Oxygen Organics experienced significant growth during the COVID-19 pandemic as misinformation relating to the pandemic led to a revival in alternative medicine. Facing a proposed class action lawsuit of its clients, the company announced its closure in November 2021, two days before American Thanksgiving.

== Product ==
The company marketed the dirt it sold as its product as fulvic acid. It encouraged buyers to consume it by dissolving it in water and drinking or bathing in it or using it as a facial mask. It claimed that the product had many health benefits, many of which were debunked by scientists and activists who monitor MLMs. Participants in the MLM scheme promoted the product on social media under the hashtag #BOO.

In September 2021, Health Canada announced a recall of Black Oxygen Organics tablets and powders, citing potential health risks and promotion of the products in ways that had not been evaluated or authorized. Between July and October 2021, the Better Business Bureau received sixteen consumer complaints against Black Oxygen Organics, the majority of which alleged difficulties reaching business representatives while seeking refunds or information regarding orders.

In November 2021, four residents of Georgia filed a class action complaint against the company which alleged that it sold a product contaminated with toxic heavy metals, based on laboratory tests by scientists which confirmed elevated levels of lead and arsenic based on levels of dosage recommended by the company. In December 2021, the US Food and Drug Administration advised consumers to stop using and throw away powder and tablet products from Black Oxygen Organics, citing elevated levels of lead and arsenic in powder sampled at the Canada–United States border.
