= The Little Sister (Roseanne) =

- Roseanne episode
- Episode no.: Season 2 Episode 2
- Directed by: John Pasquin
- Written by: Joss Whedon
- Production code: 303
- Original air date: September 19, 1989

"The Little Sister" is the second episode of the second season of the American sitcom Roseanne. Originally aired on September 19, 1989 on ABC, the episode is notable for being one of the first writing gigs of Joss Whedon's career.

== Production ==
During the first two seasons of the show, Joss Whedon got his first major jobs in the industry working as first a writer, then story editor.

== Plot ==
Jackie wants to become a policewoman, and Roseanne tries to dissuade her. In the end, Roseanne and Jackie have a physical confrontation and Roseanne makes Jackie realize how easily she could die in her new profession.

== Critical reception ==
The AV Club listed the episode as one of "10 episodes that show the heart and soul behind Roseanne’s cynical exterior", noting that this episode "fleshes out the relationship between Roseanne and Jackie and creates a subtle mirror image of them in Becky and Darlene". The site also noted that the episode has many Whedonisms including "witty dialogue" and "unexpected poignancy". Splitsider said the episode often "toe[s] the line between empowering and preachy", commenting that a discussion about pornography and body issues "while touching and progressive, is only marginally funny and not at all related to the main plot". The site added that the episode ends with one of Whedon's recurring motifs: a "well-choreographed fight scene". Philip Petre says the episode shows the first look at the loving and caring relationship between Roseanne and her sister, citing Roseanne pulling out a fake gun to demonstrate how easily her sister might die in her new profession as a "shocking moment". DVD Verdict graded the episode an A. InsidePulse referred to the ending fight as "surprisingly vicious (but hilarious)". At ErrorNotFound, both reviewers Evan and Matthew scored the episode an A−.
