= Brain-Dead Poets Society =

- Roseanne episode
- Episode no.: Season 2 Episode 10
- Directed by: John Pasquin
- Written by: Joss Whedon
- Production code: 310
- Original air date: November 28, 1989

"Brain-Dead Poets Society" is the tenth episode of the second season of the American sitcom Roseanne. Written by Joss Whedon and directed by John Pasquin, the episode first aired November 28, 1989, on ABC. The episode's title is a reference to the film Dead Poets Society.

== Plot ==
Darlene has an opportunity to recite her poem at a school performance, but she has doubts about doing it. This episode sees Darlene "properly dimensionalized" for the first time through her poem's "world-weary melancholy".

== Critical reception ==
HitFix deemed it the "most moving" episode of the series, featuring a "climax with one of the most quietly moving moments I've ever seen on a traditional family sitcom." The site argues that the episode could be read as "Roseanne's frantic attempt at bonding with a daughter whom she is suddenly and perhaps for the first time seeing something of herself in. SplitSider wrote that Whedon handles "potentially maudlin moments" like Darlene's recitation of a poem about her insecurities with "earnestness and heart." The site also thought that the "casual name-dropping of [poets] Edie Brickell, Chrissie Hynde, or Rickie Lee Jones" seemed out of character for a "middle aged working-class mother" and seemed to be entirely Whedon's work. TaylorColeMiller stated the episode showed a powerful expression of "stripping of agency" as Roseanne "forc[es] Darlene to participate in a cultural forum in which she has no interest".

DVD Verdict deemed it "the best episode of the season" due to featuring Darlene "at both her wittiest and her most vulnerable", and gave it an A. Roseanne is portrayed as a "soulful, unfulfilled artist" while her tomboyish daughter shows a "surprisingly tender and beautiful artistic side, by writing a heart-breaking poem". The moment where Roseanne creates a bond with her daughter by reading some of her own poetry was named one of the greatest moments on the show by A Crowded Bookshelf. The AV Club listed the episode as an honorable mention in its article 10 episodes that show the heart and soul behind Roseanne’s cynical exterior Vulture named it "the most humane and perfect exploration of tween girlhood I've ever seen." On the site ErrorNotFound, both reviewers Evan and Matthew gave the episode an A.

Hitfix also commented on the poetry-related fight between Roseanne and Darlene in the middle of the plot, which speaks volumes about the role of success and failure in parenting.

Their mid-episode mini-blowout in the kitchen rings entirely true because it zeroes in on an issue faced by parents the world over: whether to force their children to confront their greatest fears and risk screwing them up, or allow them to back down from their greatest fears and also risk screwing them up. It also incisively reflects the essential give-and-take that comes with raising children in a two-parent household

— Hitfix
