= Bubu (fish trap) =

Malaysian fish trapping device

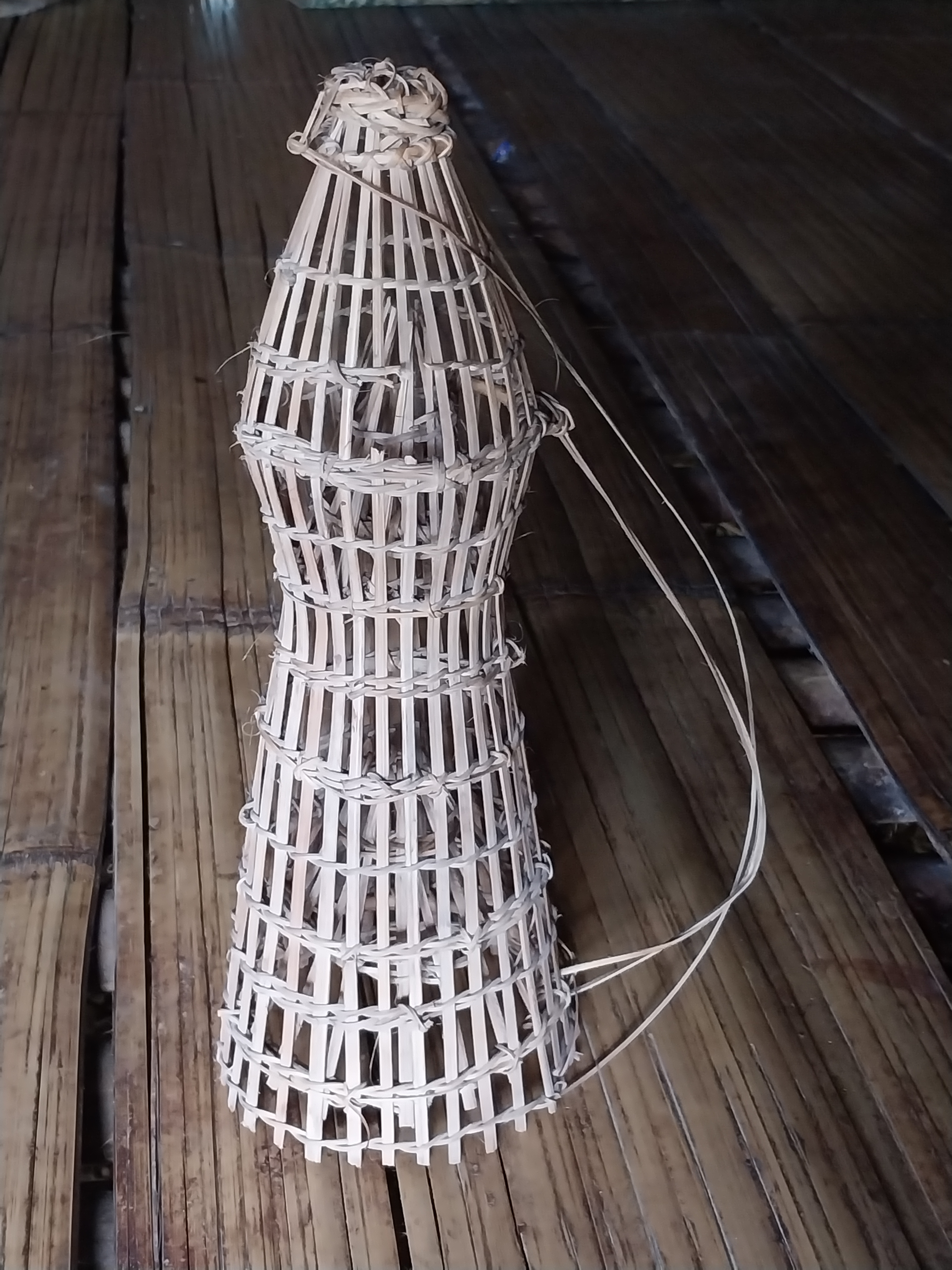
Small bubu used by the Mendriq people in Kelantan, Malaysia.

Bubu (Jawi: بوبو; also known as bubo, buwu, wuwu, and vovo) is a type of portable fish trap usually made from rattan, bamboo, or palm leaf midrib, commonly found in maritime Southeast Asia, such as Brunei, Indonesia, Malaysia, Singapore, as well as in Madagascar. The trap works akin to a long basket, with a narrow single-way funnel entry for the fish to enter, but not leave from. Bubus are often planted in shallow rivers or near aquatic vegeation where fish would swim through and be baited by the trap.

== History ==
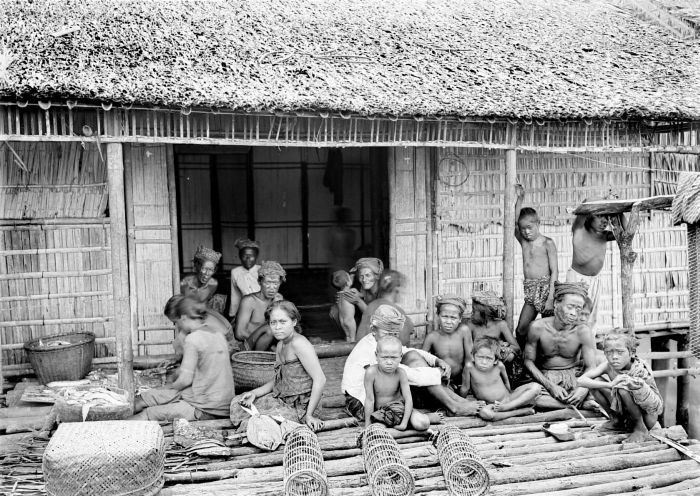
Locals preparing to fish using bubus in Dutch East Indies, early 1900s.

Bubus has long been used by fishermen across maritime Southeast Asia, and it is unclear where it specifically originated from. The usage of this trap has seen its spread throughout the world, reaching as far as Africa, East Asia, and the Polynesian islands, being persistent even until modern times. Its linguistic footprint, having so many languages using the same word or a similar variation of it, and being among the most persistent words, reflects its importance to the maritime people.

It is often preferred by the fishermen because of its passive nature, where its user does not need to actively attend to the fishing, and can leave the portable gear at any strategic point to be collected later once it has been filled with fish. It is also eco-friendly, harming neither the prey nor the environment. Despite this, overusage of the trap could still lead to overfishing due to the trap's efficiency, making it illegal in some designated areas under some jurisdictions to protect certain fisheries.

Among some tribes such as the Mendriq tribe, smaller bubus are made and given to children to play with land animals so they can learn how the trap works while they are entertained.

In modernised parts of Southeast Asia such as Singapore, bubu fishing is considered a dying tradition and is no longer commonly practised by fishermen who prefer modern tools over the traditional way.

== Terminology ==
Bubu is the term used among a lot of Southeast Asian languages, such as Malay, Indonesian, Kadazan-Dusun, Mendriq, and many more. It is unclear where the word comes from, but it is rooted all the way from at least Proto-Malayo-Polynesian as other languages inherited from it also use similar words such as Malagasy (vovo), Javanese (wuwu), Sundanese (buwu), and Tagalog (bubo), all referring to the same thing.

In the Minangkabau and Orang Rimba languages, they use lukah instead to refer to this type of fish trap.

== Characteristics ==
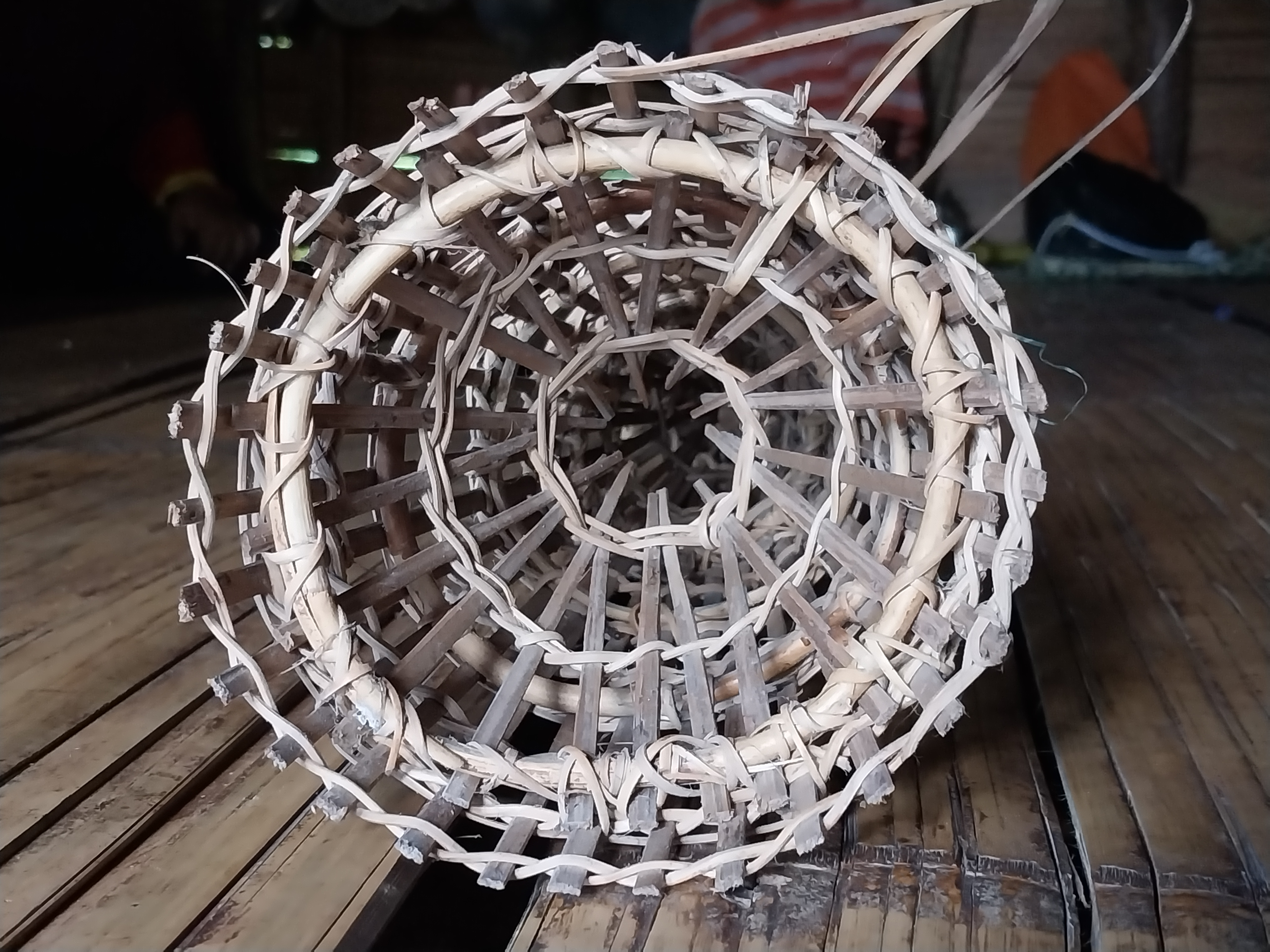
The narrow funnel entry of a bubu allows for the fish to enter but not leave the trap.

The bubu comes in various shapes, with the common characteristic being its basket-like build and the funnel entry. The shape is usually either cyllyndrical, boxed, or semi-cyllyndrical, depending on its usage. The most common form is a long cyllindrical shape, placed along the river flow to trap oncoming fish, with its length varying from 45 centimetres (18 inches) to 240 centimetres (96 inches) or more. Trapping larger fishes require larger bubus, and some bubus could even catch up to 12 1.5 kilogram fish at once.

It is traditionally and most commonly made from various types of soft thin wood such as rattan, bamboo, and palm leaf midrib. However, some modern variants are made using metal wires, usually repurposed from old wire fences. However, metal traps are prone to corrosion which may lead to pollution and cause fish to avoid the trap, compared to materials such as wood.

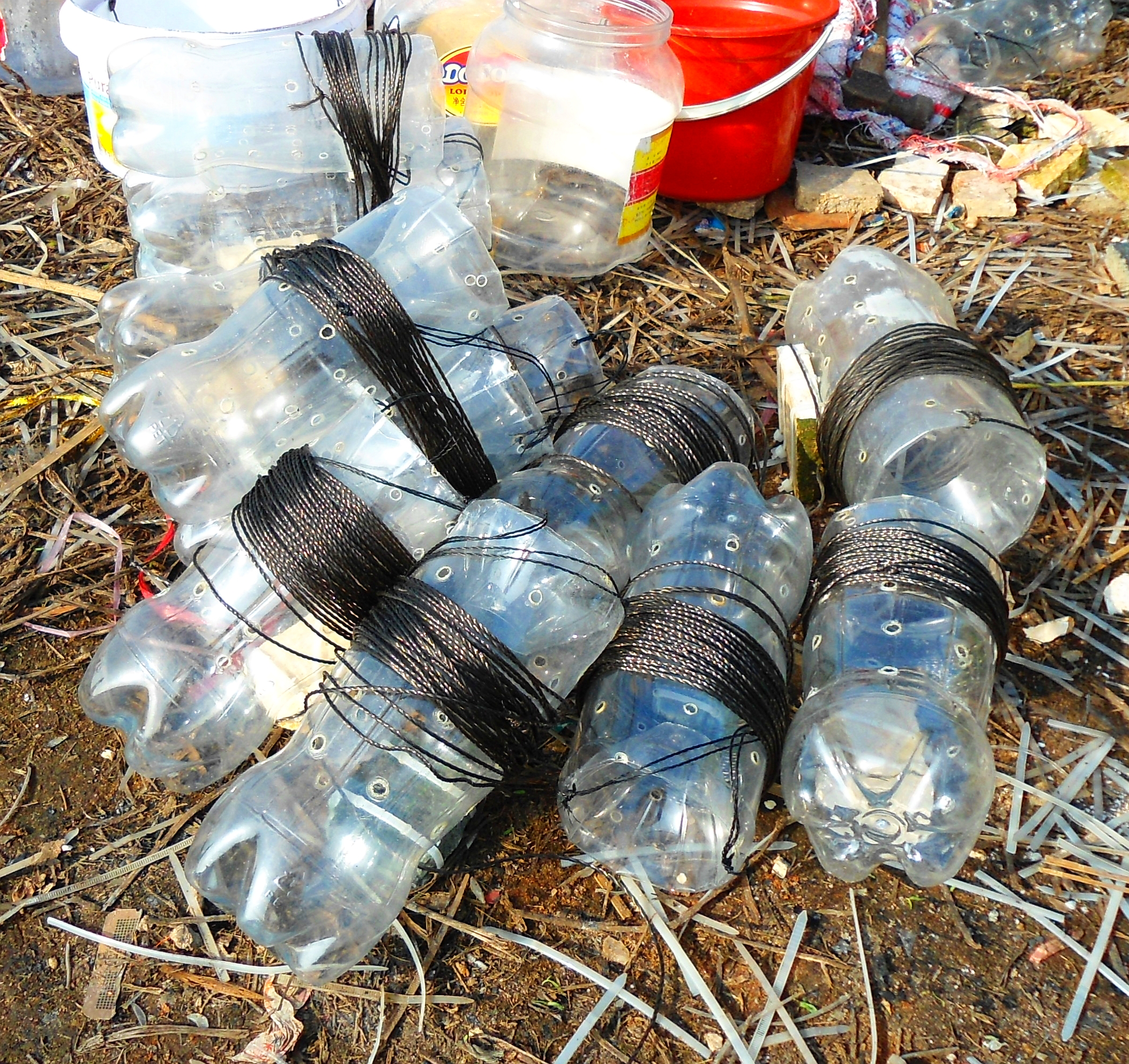
Plastic bottles turned into bubu traps used in Haikou, China.

In China, people have created modern iterations of the concept using plastic bottles, although this raises concerns relating to microplastic pollution in the waters.

Some bubus are used without bait, while other employ different types of natural bait including fermented palm kernel which attract fishes by its distinct scent.

The design of the bubu has also been used as architectural inspiration, such as for the Putra Heights LRT Station in Selangor, Malaysia.
