= Boo & Me =

Malaysian children's animated television series

Boo & Me is an animated television series, co-produced by KidsCo and Malaysian animation studio Inspidea.

The show tells the story of orphaned orang-utan Boo, and his adventures in the Malaysian rainforest with friends Aiman and Yasmin. Throughout the series, they learn valuable lessons about conservation, the importance of protecting the environment and how little things can have a big impact.

The first series launched in late 2009 and in November 2010, it was announced that a second season would be aired in spring 2011. On 9 May 2011, the channel aired a special version of its final episode, with the UK pop group Blue performing their song "I Can", which was the band's Eurovision Song Contest entry.

== Episodes ==
=== Season 1 ===
- Episode 1: "Recycling Tyres"
- Episode 2: "Plastic Bags"
- Episode 3: "Musical Cans"
- Episode 4: "Waste Not Want Not"
- Episode 5: "It's All Natural"
- Episode 6: "Do Not Litter"
- Episode 7: "Saving Batteries"
- Episode 8: "Don't Waste Water"
- Episode 9: "Recycling Paper"
- Episode 10: "Carpooling"
- Episode 11: "Too Much Fruit"
- Episode 12: "Replanting Is Sweet"
- Episode 13: "Boo to the Rescue!"

=== Season 2 ===
- Episode 1: "Save Water"
- Episode 2: "Plastic Bottle"
- Episode 3: "Deforestation"
- Episode 4: "Fire"
- Episode 5: "Good As New"
- Episode 6: "Sorting Out Recyclables"
- Episode 7: "Boo to the Rescue"
- Episode 8: "Poaching"
- Episode 9: "Noise Pollution"
- Episode 10: "Beach Day"
- Episode 11: "Boo Goes To School"
- Episode 12: "Reusing Glass"
- Episode 13: "Green Concert"

The music and underscore for each episode was composed and produced by Michelle Lee and Jon Brooks.
