= A Stash from the Past =

- Roseanne episode
- Episode no.: Season 6 Episode 4
- Directed by: Philip Charles MacKenzie
- Written by: Kevin Abbott
- Production code: 705
- Original air date: October 5, 1993

"A Stash from the Past" is the fourth episode of the sixth season of American sitcom Roseanne. Written by Kevin Abbott and directed by Philip Charles MacKenzie, the episode originally aired October 5, 1993 on ABC. Molly Eischel of The A.V. Club described it as "the show’s screwed-up version of a very special episode".

"A Stash from the Past" is a fan-favorite and is often considered one of the best episodes of the series. In 2012, star Roseanne Barr named it one of her twelve favorite episodes. The episode was ranked No. 21 on TV Guide's 100 Greatest Episodes of All-Time in 1997. In 2009, it moved to No. 33.

== Plot ==
While cleaning David's room, Roseanne is furious to find a small bag of marijuana. Meanwhile, Dan is unable to bring himself to discipline an employee who takes advantage of his good nature. By way of example, Roseanne allows Dan to watch while she sternly chastises David for bringing drugs under their roof, particularly around their 12-year old son. David meekly apologizes for doing so.

It is not until David leaves that Dan informs Roseanne that the marijuana is actually theirs, from twenty years ago. He recalls how they swore it off, when Roseanne became pregnant with Becky, and Dan was supposed to flush it down the toilet, but couldn't bring himself to do so, and hid it instead. Dan and Roseanne lament that they have grown up to be the authority figures against which they once rebelled. In a fit of nostalgia, they decide to smoke a joint while the kids are out of the house. Joined by Jackie, the three lock themselves in the bathroom and get high, but the experience is no fun as their sense of adult responsibility is too strong to allow them to relax. The reality hits when D.J. returns to the house asking for his sleeping bag, and Roseanne shouts out distorted directions to look in the garage. As she frets about what might happen to D.J. as a result of these directions, Dan flushes the remainder of the marijuana, and the three adults swear it off for good.

The following morning as Roseanne, Dan, and Jackie recover, David (who had only confessed to owning the marijuana because he assumed it was Darlene's, and was covering for her) summons the courage to tell Roseanne that the pot wasn't his, but the three adults are too hungover to respond.

== Critical reception ==
Phil Dyess-Nugent of The A.V. Club noted the episode's resonance in the context of the time period, an era in which those who grew up during the sexual revolution of the '60s now had to deal with the responsibilities of parenthood:

Roseanne was also one of the last of the TV shows and movies that came along in the Big Chill/thirtysomething ’80s that tried to define what it meant for the children of the ’60s to accept the responsibilities (and defeats) of adulthood. These are people for whom growing up sometimes feels like a defeat for reasons that go beyond selfish hedonism. They want to do what’s right for their kids, but does that have to mean surrendering the flag of Woodstock Nation?

— Phil Dyess-Nugent of The A.V. Club

Molly Eichel of The A.V. Club said one of the main appeals of the episode is that the drug-theme "feels so real...like a lived-in experience for these people", adding that "all of that humor is character-based" rather than caricature. The site's Genevieve Koski noted "Pot seems a lot less fun the older you get and the more responsibilities you take on." InsidePulse wrote that the episode "is considered one of the best episodes of the series", while The Cannabist deemed it "one of the all-time great episodes of Roseanne. Robert David Sullivan ranked it no. 81 in his "Top 100 Sitcom Episodes of All Time" list. Splitsider called it "one of television’s most honestly and hilariously handled pot-based family sitcom episodes". Marillow.com ranked it the third in their "Best Marijuana-Based Episodes in Television History." Roseanne Barr listed it as one of her 12 favorite episodes of the show, calling it "hilarious and subversive".
