= Boo (song) =

2025 single by H3adband

Single by H3adband
- Released: October 18, 2025
- Genre: Southern hip-hop
- Length: 2:18
- Label: Self-released
- Songwriter: Jordan Randall
- Producer: Randall

H3adband singles chronology
"Need It" (2025)	"Boo" (2025)	"Stand on It" (2025)

Music video
- "Boo" on YouTube

"Boo" is a single by American rapper H3adband, released on October 18, 2025. Described as a "Louisiana rap anthem" with "spooky" synths, it became his breakout hit after going viral on the video-sharing app TikTok.

== Promotion ==
The song was featured in a dance trend on TikTok that started at the end of October 2025. Many celebrities have since participated in the challenge, including Savannah James, DaBaby and Valentin Chmerkovskiy. Listeners noted the similarities between the voices of H3adband and fellow Baton Rouge rapper YoungBoy Never Broke Again, which also helped the song gain wider exposure.

== Commercial performance ==
According to Luminate, the song had 48,000 official on-demand U.S. streams in the week from October 31 to November 6, 2025. Over the next three weeks, it experienced a 1,882% increase in streams, reaching to 960,000 streams by the week of November 21–27.

== Charts ==
Chart performance for "Boo"
Chart (2025–2026)	Peak position
US Billboard Hot 100	90
US Hot R&B/Hip-Hop Songs (Billboard)	19
