= Mark Samuels =

Canadian choreographer, and dancer

- Born: Toronto, Ontario
- Occupations: Choreographer, dancer

Mark Samuels (born in Toronto, Ontario) is a Canadian choreographer, dancer and movement coach. As a professional dancer, he is known for performing with major recording artists such as Mariah Carey, Mary J. Blige, Missy Elliott, Mario, Maestro Fresh Wes, Jully Black and Shawn Desman. As a choreographer, Mark is best known for his contributions in Disneys Descendants, A Series of Unfortunate Events, The Magicians, An American Girl: Isabelle Dances Into the Spotlight, Honey Girls, Latin Pop boy band CNCO and Juno Award winner, Savannah Ré.

== Early life ==
Mark was born in Toronto, Ontario, Canada. Both his parents are of Indo-Jamaican descent. They moved from Kempshill, Jamaica to Toronto in 1973 to start a family. He has two siblings, Wayne Samuels and Jeff Samuels. Mark grew up in Jane and Finch, an area known as one of the roughest neighbourhoods in Canada. At 13 years old, Mark started his dance journey in middle school at a talent show, performing an impersonation of Kid 'N Play. In 1995, Mark joined Toronto's biggest and most recognizable dance troupe, Do Dat. He was hired to dance for many successful Canadian recording artists such as Maestro Fresh Wes, Jully Black, Glen Lewis, 2 Rude, B4-4, Shawn Desman, Deborah Cox and many more. He also performed on Canada's most notable award shows, The Juno Awards and the Much Music Video Awards (MMVAs).

In 1999, he left Canada to pursue a dance career in the US. Mark was one of the first commercial hip hop dancers from Canada to ever work in the United States. He was fortunate enough to dance for major recording artists such as Mariah Carey, Mary J. Blige, Missy Elliott, Mario, Rihanna, Kelis, Olivia, Nivea and others. In 2009, Mark returned back to Canada where he met fellow choreographer Paul Becker, who was instrumental in shifting Mark's career from dancer to choreographer.

== Career ==
In 2014, Mark was introduced to the world of musical theatre in TV & Film, landing his first major choreography role on the TV show Murdoch Mysteries (Season 7, Episode 10). Since 2015, Mark has been fully immersed in the Vancouver film scene. He was introduced to Kenny Ortega, who brought him on as the main hip hop choreographer for Disney's Descendants, starring Dove Cameron, Sofia Carson, Mitchell Hope, Cameron Boyce and Booboo Stewart. It was noted as one of the most-watched original movies on cable television. It also won a DGA, WGA and Primetime Emmy Award. In 2018, Mark helped choreograph three musical numbers on The Magicians - (Season 3 Episode 9, "All That Josh"). In 2017, he was the associate choreographer for A Series of Unfortunate Events, starring Neil Patrick Harris.

In 2021, Mark was the assistant choreographer on A Week Away, a Christian-based musical film. Later that year, he worked as the associate choreographer on Honey Girls, starring recording artist Ashanti. In 2022, Mark was the choreographer on the Hallmark movie, Just One Kiss. In addition to TV & Film, Mark provides movement coaching and performance direction for various recording artists. In 2010, he choreographed and worked directly with Shawn Desman for his music video, Money Shot. He worked again with Shawn in 2023 as a movement coach on the music video Love Me With The Lights On.

In 2022, Mark worked alongside Juno Award winner, Savannah Ré for her debut headlining show. He was the sole choreographer for Drake's OVO North Stars show, working with R&B group In Essence and solo recording artist, Dru Grange. Later that year, he also worked on performance direction with Leila Dey, who opened for Juno Award winner, Jessie Reyez on her headlining tour, Yessie.

=== Creative Direction ===
Mark was one of two creative directors on the CNCO World Tour. He was responsible for creating the visual concepts for the show. He also co-choreographed and staged the group. He coordinated with lighting, special effects and set design teams to bring key moments to life. He also was instrumental in producing music for the infamous breakdown dance sections that CNCO performed on The Latin Billboard Awards.

== Awards ==
- 2022 - Leo Award winner for Honey Girls
- 2010 - Much Music Video Of The Year Shawn Desman - Night Like This

== Work (choreography and movement, performance direction) ==
TV/Film (Choreographer/Associate Choreographer)

Year	TV/Film	Network	Director
2008	Pop It - Season 1 & 2	TVO	Paul Hart
2011	Ils Dansent	CBC	
2014	Dr Cabbie	E-One Entertainment	Jean Francois Pouliot
2014	American Girl: Isabelle Dances Into The Spotlight	NBC	Debra Martin Chase
2014	Rise	ABC Spark	
2014	Murdoch Mysteries - Season 7, Episode 10	CBC	Harvey Crossland
2016	Death of a Vegas Showgirl	Lifetime	Penelope Buitenhuis
2016	Taxi 22		
2017	Hot Street		Xiaomin Zhang
2017	A Series of Unfortunate Events - Season 1 - 3	Netflix	Barry Sonnenfeld
2022	Just One Kiss	W Network	Jeff Beesley
2022	Honor Society	Netflix	Oran Zegman
2022	Something Here		T.K. McKamy
2022	Scaredy Cats - Season 1, Episode 5	Netflix	Anna McRoberts

TV/Film (Assistant Choreographer/Choreography Team)

Year	TV/Film	Network	Director
2015	The Descendants	Disney	Kenny Ortega
2018	Overboard	Netflix	Rob Greenberg
2019	Tallboyz - Season 1, Episode 1	CBC	Bruce McCulloch
2020	Julie & The Phantoms	Netflix	Kenny Ortega
2020	Motherland: Fort Salem - Season 1, Episode 4	Freeform	Steven Adelson
2021	A Week Away	Netflix	Roman White
2021	Honey Girls	Apple TV	Trey Fanjoy
2022	Ivy & Bean: Doomed To Dance	Netflix	Elissa Down

Music Videos (Choreographer)

Year	Artist	Title	Director
2010	Shawn Desman	"Money Shot"	Randall "RT!" Thorne
2011	Lauren Elle	"Accessories"	Director X
2011	Guinevere	"Crazy Crazy"	Anton Josef
2012	Morgan Page feat. Tegan & Sara	"Body Work"	Lisa Mann
2013	Classified	"Pay Day"	Harvey Glazer
2013	Mandia Nantsios	"One Last Time"	David Mewa
2014	Kira Isabelle	"Shake It (If You Got It)"	The Young Astronauts
2014	Serani	"In My Arms"	David Mewa
2014	Mandia Nantsios	"Secret"	David Mewa
2014	Alyssa Reid	"Satisfaction Guaranteed"	Marc Andre Debruyne
2014	J-Diggz	"Just Push It"	
2015	Flosstradamus feat Lil Jon	"Prison Riot"	The Young Astronauts
2017	Belly	"Mumble Rap" (Assistant Choreographer)	Karena Evans
2018	CNCO	"Se Vuelve Loca"	David Rousseau
2019	FYI feat Busta Rhymes	"Bigger Better Faster"	Harvey Glazer
2019	Buju Banton	"Trust"	Kieran Khan
2019	Reptile feat. Jadakiss	"YO"	Danny Feighery
2021	Charmaine	"BBM"	Jacqueline Ashton
2021	Dru Grange	"Can't Get Enough"	Charlton Visuals
2023	Savannah Re feat. Mez	"Bands"	Nate Burland
2023	Shawn Desman	"Love Me With The Lights On" (Assistant Choreographer)	Dan LeMoyne
2024	Rachelle Show	"Better Off Alone"	Spoken By T

Commercials/Brands (Choreographer/Principal Dancer)

Year	Title/Artist	Brand	Director
2004	"I-Run"	Nike	
2008	So You Think You Can Dance Canada		
2012	Mini Pop Kids	K-Tel Records	
2016	"Cool Robot - Never Give Up"	Oxford Books	Drake Doremus
2019	"Be Bold, Be Great"	Bank Of Montreal	Lisa Mann
2021	"Be The Cheer"	Cheerios	Shaun Collings

Live Performances/Tours (Choreographer)

Year	Artist/Event	Show/Tour	Label/Network
2009	Danny Fernandes	Promo Tour	CP Records
2012	Dru Grange	Summerfest Flow 93.5 FM	
2012	Guinevere	Promo Tour	
2012	Kim Davis	Promo Shows	
2015	Closing Ceremony	Pan Am CC/Para Pan Am Games	CBC Sports
2015	Serena Ryder	Pan Am CC/Para Pan Am Games	CBC Sports
2015	World Thrombosis Day		
2017	CNCO	Mas Alla Tour	Sony Music Latin
2017	Dru Grange	Breakfast Television	City TV
2017	Night At The Movies	Dancing With The Stars	ABC
2022	In Essence	OVO North Stars	
2022	Dru Grange	OVO North Stars	
2022	Charmaine	Manifesto	Sony BMG
2023	Leila Dey	Yessie Tour	
2024	Dru Grange	Breakfast Television	City TV
2024	Dru Grange	Soul Nostalgia Residency	

Award Shows (Choreographer/Principal Dancer)

2000	The Source Hip Hop Music Awards	Mary J Blige	BET
2003	Video Game Awards	Kelis	Spike TV
2006	MuchMusic Video Awards	Nelly Furtado feat. Timbaland	MuchMusic
2011	MuchMusic Video Awards	Shawn Desman	MuchMusic
2011	Juno Awards	Shawn Desman & Danny Fernandez	CBC
2013	Juno Awards	The Barenaked Ladies	CBC
2018	Latin American Music Awards	CNCO (Co-Choreographer)	Telemundo
2022	The Legacy Awards	Various Artists (Assistant Choreographer)	CBC

Music Videos (Principal Dancer)

Year	Artist	Title	Director
1999	Mariah Carey feat. Da Brat & Missy Elliott	"Heartbreaker" Remix	Hype Williams
2000	Wyclef Jean feat. The Rock	"It Doesn't Matter"	Director X
2001	Mario	"Just A Friend 2000"	Diane Martel
2001	Olivia	"Are U Capable"	J Records
2001	Missy Elliott	"Get Ur Freak On"	Dave Myers
2009	Rihanna	"Pon De Replay"	Director X
2009	Jully Black	"Sweat Off Your Brow"	Lakeshore Records
2010	Shawn Desman	"Night Like This"	Randall "RT!" Thorne
2010	Naturi Naughton	"H8TRZ"	
2010	Shawn Desman	"Shiver"	Randall "RT!" Thorne
2011	Keshia Chante	"Shooting Star"	Marc Andre Debruyne
2012	Victoria Duffield	"Break My Heart"	Alon Isocianu
2012	Victoria Duffield feat Cody Simpson	"They Don't Know About Us"	Randall "RT!" Thorne
2012	Shawn Desman	"Nobody Does It Like You"	Randall "RT!" Thorne
2012	Victoria Duffield	"Feel"	Alon Isocianu
2013	Shawn Desman	"Too Young Too Care"	Marc Andre Debruyne
