= Knee Deep (Roseanne) =

- Roseanne episode
- Episode no.: Season 10; Episode 9
- Directed by: Gail Mancuso
- Written by: Bruce Rasmussen
- Production code: 1008
- Original air date: May 22, 2018

Guest appearances
- James Pickens Jr. as Chuck; French Stewart as Dean; Doug Stanhope as Ray; Drue Delio as Patron; Austin Brady as Man

Episode chronology
← Previous "Netflix & Pill"	Next → —
- Roseanne season 10

"Knee Deep" is the ninth and final episode of the tenth season of the American sitcom Roseanne, the 231st episode of the series overall and the finale of the show's revival. It aired in the United States on ABC on May 22, 2018. The episode was directed by Gail Mancuso, and written by Bruce Rasmussen.

Roseanne stars Roseanne Barr, John Goodman, Laurie Metcalf, Sara Gilbert, Lecy Goranson, Michael Fishman, Emma Kenney, Ames McNamara, and Jayden Rey as the Conner family. The series originally ran for nine seasons from 1988 to 1997, and was revived for a tenth season in 2018.

In the episode, Roseanne's knee gets worse and the family's basement is flooded. The episode received generally positive reviews from critics, and was watched live in the United States by 10.58 million viewers.

This episode marked the final appearance of longtime creator/namesake Roseanne Barr as a series regular. Within a week of the episode's airing, Roseanne was abruptly cancelled following Barr's firing, a tweet from the show's star which was construed as being racist, and was subsequently replaced with a spin-off, titled The Conners.

== Plot ==
Dan decides to hire cheaper illegal immigrants for a drywalling job to pay for Roseanne's knee surgery, but she is against it. Becky offers Darlene advice on getting more tips at work, while Roseanne and Jackie search the basement for valuable items to sell to pay for the surgery. While, Roseanne and Jackie are at an antique store attempting to sell their mother's vintage doll, Dan discovers that the basement has flooded from the recent storm. Chuck is upset that Dan has hired immigrants rather than his crew. The family is excited when the President declares a state of emergency which will provide money to fix the basement. Dan can do the repairs himself and have enough left over for Roseanne's surgery. Darlene starts writing again, Dan and Chuck form a partnership. Roseanne worries about the surgery.

== Production ==
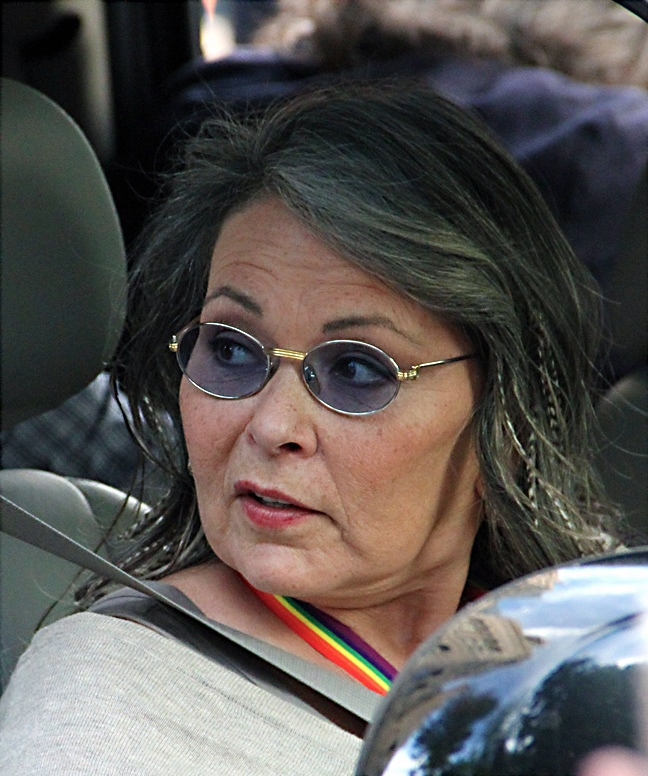
"Knee Deep" marks Roseanne Barr's final appearance as a regular on Roseanne before her show was subsequently cancelled by ABC, following controversial tweets about on Twitter.

The idea for Roseanne to have a knee problem was inspired by Roseanne Barr's own knee problem that she had prior to the start of the season, and she wondered how her character would deal with it. Barr also wanted to shed light on the health care issues in the United States, and the producers, including Barr, felt the best way to do this was to have Roseanne have a problem, because they felt that she "was going to get the most attention and [that they] could have easily put it onto any of the characters, but the fact that Roseanne is dealing with it [was their] way of speaking to the level of importance of this issue in America today".

== Reception ==
=== Viewing figures ===
In the United States, the episode was watched live by 10.58 million viewers, making it the second most watched show of the night in terms of number of viewers, behind only NCIS. It was the most watched show of the night in terms of 18-49 rating, with a 2.5, and in terms of ratings share, with a 12. Within seven days, the episode was watched by a total of 15.64 million viewers.

=== Critical response ===
Kimberly Potts with Vulture said, "A season-ender that would have been satisfying even if ABC hadn’t renewed Roseanne after this batch of nine episodes." She also gave the episode 5 out of 5 stars.

Kelly Lawler with USA Today said, "It's an uneven end to an uneven nine-episode season for the revival, with 13 more episodes due this fall. It doesn't really address the big revelation of Roseanne's addiction (she's still in pain, but there's no mention of popping pills, withdrawal or any side effects). But it brings the show back to the essence of the Conner family: their big dinner table with mismatched chairs. And there's room for improvement in a Season 11."

== Future ==
Roseanne was originally renewed for an eleventh season on March 30, 2018, three days after the tenth season premiere. However, on May 29, 2018, ABC reversed its decision and cancelled the series due to a tweet by Roseanne Barr which was construed as being racist, and the actress was fired from the show. The following day, it was announced that a spin-off series was in development. On June 21, 2018, it was announced that ABC had green-lit a spin-off, entitled The Conners, with the rest of the cast returning for it. The Conners premiered on October 16, 2018.
