= Keep On Truckin' (The Conners) =

- The Conners episode
- Episode no.: Season 1 Episode 1
- Directed by: Andy Ackerman
- Written by: Bruce Helford; Bruce Rasmussen; Dave Caplan
- Production code: 101
- Original air date: October 16, 2018

Guest appearances
- Estelle Parsons as Beverly; James Pickens Jr. as Chuck; Natalie West as Crystal; Mary Steenburgen as Marcy Bellinger

Episode chronology
← Previous —	Next → "Tangled Up in Blue"

"Keep On Truckin'" is the pilot episode of the American spin-off sitcom The Conners. It aired in the United States on ABC on October 16, 2018. The episode was directed by Andy Ackerman, and written by Bruce Helford, Bruce Rasmussen and Dave Caplan. This is the first episode not to feature the show's previous star Roseanne Barr.

The Conners, a sequel spin-off of the series Roseanne, stars John Goodman, Laurie Metcalf, Sara Gilbert, Lecy Goranson, Michael Fishman, Emma Kenney, Ames McNamara, Jayden Rey, and Maya Lynne Robinson as the titular family. The series was created following the abrupt cancellation of the successful Roseanne revival due to controversial tweets from star Roseanne Barr, who was officially fired from the show by ABC in this year.

The episode follows the Conner family as they begin to deal with the death of the family's matriarch Roseanne. The episode received generally positive reviews from critics, and was watched live in the United States by 10.56 million viewers.

== Plot ==
Three weeks after Roseanne's death, the family is still grieving. The family finds out that Roseanne didn't die from a heart attack as they had originally thought, but rather from an opioid overdose. Dan blames their neighbor Marcy Bellinger, who gave Roseanne the pills they found in her closet, for her death. Later after learning Roseanne had also gotten pills from other sources, and after talking with Marcy, Dan decides to stop blaming her. Dan also helps Mark decide which boy he likes, Jackie grieves by trying to reorganize the kitchen, and Geena returns home from Afghanistan. Lastly, Dan, after sleeping on the couch since Roseanne's death, decides to sleep in his bed again.

== Production ==
=== Development ===
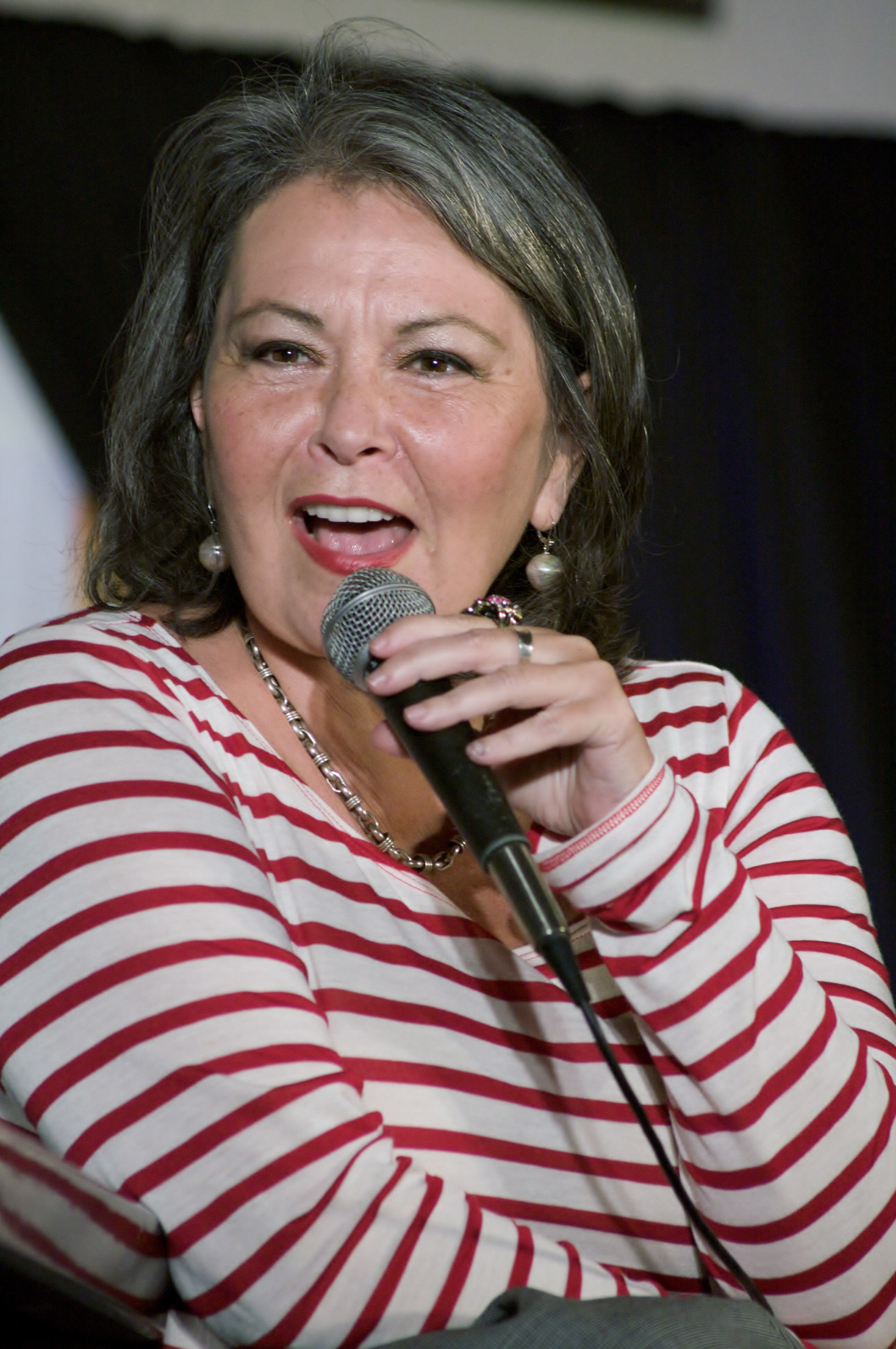
Roseanne Barr was fired from the show after she made a controversial statement on Twitter about Valerie Jarrett.

Due to the success of the tenth season of Roseanne, ABC renewed Roseanne for an eleventh season on March 30, 2018, three days after the premiere of the tenth season. However, on May 29, 2018, ABC cancelled Roseanne due to racist tweets by star Roseanne Barr. The following day, it was announced that a spin-off of Roseanne centered on the rest of the family was being discussed by the producers of the series, as the cast was already under contract for another season of Roseanne. On June 21, 2018, it was announced that ABC had ordered ten episodes of a Roseanne spin-off, The Conners, and that the other five principal cast members were all set to return for it. On August 31, 2018, it was announced that Barr's character Roseanne Conner, would be killed off. That same day, it was announced that production had begun on the episode.

=== Casting ===
On August 28, 2018, it was announced the remaining three cast members from the tenth season of Roseanne, Emma Kenney, Ames McNamara, and Jayden Rey, were all set to join John Goodman, Sara Gilbert, Laurie Metcalf, Lecy Goranson, and Michael Fishman on the new series. On September 14, 2018, it was announced that Maya Lynne Robinson had been cast as Geena Williams-Conner, replacing Xosha Roquemore who played the character in the tenth season of Roseanne.

== Reception ==
=== Viewing figures ===
In the United States, the episode was watched live by 10.56 million viewers, making it the second-most-watched show of the night in terms of number of viewers, behind only NCIS. It was the most-watched show of the night in terms of 18-49 rating, with a 2.4, and in terms of ratings share, with a 10. Within seven days, the episode was watched by a total of 13.65 million viewers.

=== Critical response ===
Kimberly Potts with Vulture said, "I’m still not totally sold on whether or not The Conners can continue to have a reason to exist without Barr. But the premiere shows they know why we’ve loved these characters for three decades now, and why we’re interested in seeing how they, as individuals and as a family, will maneuver their grief, evolve through it. That’s enough of a reason for the Conners, and The Conners, to soldier on, and enough to keep me tuning in." She also gave the episode 5 out of 5 stars.

Scott Collura with IGN said, "The Conners successfully moves on without Roseanne, focusing squarely on the family of the title who were always essential to the original show anyway. Do things feel different without Roseanne? Sure. Does The Conners suffer from her absence? So far, not at all." He also gave the episode an 8.3 of 10.

=== Accolades ===
Editor Brian Schnuckel was nominated for a Primetime Emmy Award, in the category of Outstanding Multi-Camera Picture Editing for a Comedy Series, at the 71st Primetime Emmy Awards, for his work on the episode.
