= Into That Good Night =

- Roseanne episodes
- Episode nos.: Season 9 Episodes 23/24
- Directed by: Gary Halvorson
- Production code: 1023/1024
- Original air date: May 20, 1997

Guest appearances
- Johnny Galecki as David Healy; Glenn Quinn as Mark Healy; Estelle Parsons as Beverly Harris; Martin Mull as Leon Carp; Sandra Bernhard as Nancy Bartlett; Fred Willard as Scott

Episode chronology
← Previous "Arsenic and Old Mom"	Next → "Twenty Years to Life"

"Into That Good Night" is the two-part season finale of the ninth season of the American sitcom Roseanne. The episode is the 23rd and the 24th episode of the season, the 221st and the 222nd episode overall and originally served as the show's series finale until Roseanne was revived in March 2018. The two-parter originally aired on May 20, 1997, on ABC, and was directed by Gary Halvorson.

After the negative reception season 9 had received, this episode undid all the plot progressions since the Conners winning the lottery by claiming it was all a fictionalization. This polarized many critics, and it remains one of the most controversial finales of all time, even after the revival season which effectively reversed all of the ill-received aspects.

The title refers to the poem "Do not go gentle into that good night" by Dylan Thomas.

This episode marked the final appearance of Glenn Quinn as Mark Healy, before his death in December 2002.

== Plot ==
The beginning of season nine saw the Conners win the lottery, which changed the dynamic of the show by increasing their socio-economic level. This finale "ripped out the rug from under viewers" by showing that the entire plot of the ninth season was in fact a dream that Roseanne Conner had concocted in her new career as a writer.

== Critical reception ==
Time listed it in its article That Was It?: 10 Controversial TV Series Finales, describing it as "off-the-rails loopy", and compared the finale to Barr's career at that point: "by becoming rich and famous, she’d turned into an unbearable diva who’d forgotten the little people". Uproxx wrote that it "almost made up for all the nonsense before it." The A.V. Club stated that the episode "makes either excuses or amends for the season that preceded it". The Independent thought that the "middling" finale did not do justice to the show, writing "This was less a farewell than a Viking funeral, and it was worth trying to remember, even as you stared in slack-jawed astonishment at the burning boats, how much the series had deserved a good send-off."
