= Twenty Years to Life =

- Roseanne episode
- Episode no.: Season 10; Episode 1
- Directed by: John Pasquin
- Written by: Bruce Rasmussen
- Production code: 1001
- Original air date: March 27, 2018

Guest appearances
- Sarah Chalke as Andrea; Marques Ray as Ramon

Episode chronology
← Previous "Into That Good Night"	Next → "Dress to Impress"
- Roseanne (season 10)

"Twenty Years to Life" is the tenth season premiere of the American sitcom Roseanne and the 223rd episode overall. It aired in the United States on ABC on March 27, 2018. The episode was directed by John Pasquin, and written by Bruce Rasmussen.

Roseanne stars Roseanne Barr, John Goodman, Laurie Metcalf, Sara Gilbert, Lecy Goranson, Michael Fishman, Emma Kenney, Ames McNamara, and Jayden Rey as the Conner family. The series originally ran for nine seasons from 1988 to 1997, and was revived for a tenth season in 2018. This is the first episode not feature original late star Glenn Quinn, who played Mark Healy in recurring role, died in 2002.

In the episode, Darlene moves back in with her parents, Roseanne and Jackie reconcile, and Becky tells the family that she is becoming a surrogate. The episode received generally positive reviews from critics, and was watched live in the United States by 18.44 million viewers.

== Plot ==
One week after Darlene and her kids, Harris and Mark, moved back in, Roseanne and Dan are still adjusting to not living alone. Now that there are kids in the house again, Dan tries to find where he hid his gun, and manages to find it. Roseanne finds out that Darlene didn't move in to take care of her and Dan as she had said, but that she actually moved in because she lost her job. Roseanne and Jackie are still mad at each other about the 2016 election, so Darlene tries to get them to work it out. Also, Becky announces to the family that she plans to become a surrogate, which Jackie supports, but Roseanne and Dan do not. Lastly, Roseanne and Jackie manage to reconcile, and Becky meets with Andrea, the woman for whom she plans to have the baby.

== Production ==
=== Development ===
On April 28, 2017, it was announced that an eight episode limited series revival of Roseanne was in development. On May 16, 2017, it was announced that the revival was picked up by ABC, and would air sometime in 2018. The table read of the episode occurred on October 17, 2017.

=== Casting ===
When the revival was picked up by ABC, it was announced that the entire original cast would return, Roseanne Barr, John Goodman, Laurie Metcalf, Sara Gilbert, Lecy Goranson, and Michael Fishman, with Sarah Chalke returning for a different role. On September 7, 2017, it was announced that Ames McNamara had been cast as Mark. On September 21, 2017, it was announced that Emma Kenney would play Harris. On October 17, 2017, it was revealed that Jayden Rey would portray the role of Mary. On December 21, 2017, it was announced that Chalke would play Andrea.

=== Release ===
The episode aired alongside the second episode of the season, "Dress To Impress", as a one-hour special premiere. On February 15, 2018, ABC aired a special episode of 20/20, titled "Roseanne: The Return", which looked back at the history of the show, and featured the entire cast sharing information about the revival.

== Reception ==
=== Viewing figures ===
In the United States, the episode was watched live by 18.44 million viewers, making it the most watched show of the night in terms of number of viewers. It was also the most watched show of the night in terms of 18-49 rating, with a 5.2, and in terms of ratings share, with a 21. Within seven days, the episode was watched by a total of 27.26 million viewers.

The number of live viewers was ten percent more than the original series finale, "Into That Good Night", in 1997, and the 18-49 rating was the highest for any comedy telecast since the eighth season premiere of The Big Bang Theory, "The Locomotion Interruption", in 2014. The 18-49 rating was also the highest for any Tuesday entertainment telecast in six years, and it was the second highest scripted telecast of the 2017–18 television season, behind only an episode of This Is Us, "Super Bowl Sunday", which aired immediately after Super Bowl LII.

=== Critical response ===
Kimberly Potts with Vulture said, "Times have changed, but the people haven’t, which is why it’s so good to have the Conners back." She also gave the episode 4 out of 5 stars.

Christine Laskodi with IGN said, "Classic Roseanne is still intact. If you were a fan of the original, it won't be a hard sell for you to comfortably enjoy it a second time around. If you're just discovering Roseanne for the first time, it will just feel comfortable. It's exactly the reboot that 2018 America needs." She also gave the episode a 7.5 out of 10.

The episode also received praise from President Donald Trump, who called Roseanne Barr to congratulate her on the success of the show, and the high ratings.
