= The Extra Man =

The Extra Man may refer to:

- The Extra Man, a 1998 novel by Jonathan Ames
- The Extra Man (film), a 2010 film based on Ames's novel
- "The Extra Man" (Law & Order: Criminal Intent), a 2001 TV episode
- Extra man offense, a situation in field lacrosse
