= The Roseanne Show =

American television talk show

- Genre: Talk show
- Presented by: Roseanne Barr
- Country of origin: United States
- Original language: English
- No. of seasons: 2
- No. of episodes: 281

Production
- Production locations: CBS Television City, Hollywood
- Running time: 42–43 minutes
- Production companies: Full Moon & High Tide Productions; King World

Original release
- Network: Syndication
- Release: September 14, 1998 – June 23, 2000

The Roseanne Show is an American first-run syndicated talk show that was hosted by Roseanne Barr. The show ran for two seasons from September 14, 1998, to June 23, 2000, in which it broadcast 281 episodes.

== Format ==
The show featured Barr interviewing guests. During some episodes there were live call-ins or web chats from viewers and celebrities. The set of the show consisted of a living room, a kitchen, and a garden scene. The set rotated to present a different interview setting. The show also featured skits with audience member participation. Skits included Judge Roseanne, The Dr. Is In-sane and a dating game-esque skit. Some skits also included her producer Mary Pelloni. Throughout the show's entire two-year run, Dailey Pike was Roseanne's warmup guy and sidekick regular on the show. In season one, Zach Hope was Roseanne's cyber sidekick. Later in season two, Michael Fishman, who portrayed D.J. Conner on Roseanne, replaced Hope as Roseanne's cyber sidekick.

Notable people who performed on The Roseanne Show were Enrique Iglesias, Sheryl Crow, Mick Foley, Janice Robinson, Lulu, LFO, Joan Jett, Pat Benatar, Anna Nicole Smith, and Tori Amos.

== Production ==
The show was taped before a live studio audience at CBS Television City stage 46 in Hollywood, California. It was produced by King World Productions under co-production of Roseanne's own company, Full Moon and High Tide Productions.

On October 7, 1999, John Lydon was scheduled to appear on the show but was removed before rehearsal for having his own camera crew backstage despite having written consent from the producer. The entire show with John Lydon was canceled, along with the rest of the week's tapings. After that week, the show continued production until June 2000.

== Broadcast history and release ==
The show cleared and aired in 85% of markets and ran from September 14, 1998 to June 23, 2000, with reruns airing until September 8 of that year. 281 episodes of the show were produced. The rights are now owned by CBS Television Distribution.

== Reception ==
The show received a negative reception from television critics
