= Roseanne season 10 =

Season of television series

Roseanne
- Season 10
- Promotional poster
- Starring: Roseanne Barr; John Goodman; Laurie Metcalf; Sara Gilbert; Lecy Goranson; Michael Fishman; Emma Kenney; Ames McNamara; Jayden Rey
- No. of episodes: 9

Release
- Original network: ABC
- Original release: March 27 – May 22, 2018

Season chronology
- ← Previous; Season 9

The tenth and final season of the American television sitcom Roseanne follows the Conners, a working-class family, struggling to get by on a limited household income in their home at 714 Delaware Street in the drab fictional mid-state exurb of Lanford, Illinois. The season was produced by Carsey-Werner Television, with Roseanne Barr, Bruce Helford, Whitney Cummings, Sara Gilbert, Tom Werner, and Tony Hernandez serving as executive producers.

Barr starred as Roseanne Conner, while John Goodman played Dan Conner. They were joined by principal cast members Laurie Metcalf, Gilbert, Lecy Goranson, and Michael Fishman, who reprised their roles from the previous seasons, with Emma Kenney, Ames McNamara, and Jayden Rey joining them. Development on a revival of Roseanne series, with Barr, Goodman, and Gilbert. ABC ordered a tenth season revival of the series, consisting of eight episodes, set to air as a mid-season replacement during the 2017–18 television season, with the original cast. Production on the season began in October 2017. An additional episode was ordered in November 2017.

The season premiere was watched by 18.44 million viewers and had a 5.2 rating in the 18–49 demographic, the highest rated Tuesday entertainment telecast in six years among adults 18–49, and television's highest rated comedy telecast on any night in 3.5 years, since The Big Bang Theory in September 2014. The season, which premiered on ABC on March 27, 2018, has received generally positive reviews from critics. The series was renewed for an eleventh season on March 30, 2018, just three days after the season premiere, but the series was subsequently cancelled by ABC on May 29, 2018, following Barr's remarks made on Twitter about Valerie Jarrett, a former advisor to President Barack Obama. This is the final season of Roseanne and the eleventh season was replaced by The Conners, a direct continuation whose cast excluded Barr.

== Cast and characters ==
=== Main ===
- Roseanne Barr as Roseanne Conner
- John Goodman as Dan Conner
- Laurie Metcalf as Jackie Harris
- Sara Gilbert as Darlene Conner
- Lecy Goranson as Becky Conner-Healy
- Michael Fishman as D.J. Conner
- Emma Kenney as Harris Conner-Healy
- Ames McNamara as Mark Conner-Healy
- Jayden Rey as Mary Conner

=== Guest ===
- Sarah Chalke as Andrea
- Judy Prescott as Miss Crane
- Estelle Parsons as Beverly Harris
- Sandra Bernhard as Nancy Bartlett
- Natalie West as Crystal Anderson
- Adilah Barnes as Anne Marie Mitchell
- Johnny Galecki as David Healy
- Christopher Lloyd as Lou
- James Pickens, Jr. as Chuck Mitchell

== Episodes ==
Roseanne, season 10 episodes
No. overall	No. in season	Title	Directed by	Written by	Original release date	Prod. code	US viewers (millions)
223	1	"Twenty Years to Life"	John Pasquin	Bruce Rasmussen	March 27, 2018	1001	18.44
Darlene Conner, long separated from husband David Healy, moves in with her aging parents, Roseanne and Dan Conner, ostensibly to help care for them. With her are her and David's two children, teen-daughter, Harris, and pre-teen son, Mark. Darlene eventually admits to losing her publishing job in Chicago. Darlene reunites Roseanne with her sister, Jackie Harris, after their year-long feud over the 2016 presidential election and Roseanne supporting Donald Trump. Meanwhile, widowed Becky, who waitresses at a Mexican restaurant, announces that a childless couple is paying her $50,000 to be a surrogate. However, she lied, claiming she is ten years younger. D.J. Conner, a military veteran, is married and has a young daughter, Mary. His wife, Gina, who is still in the military, is serving overseas.
224	2	"Dress to Impress"	John Pasquin	Darlene Hunt	March 27, 2018	1003	18.44
Dan and Roseanne have issues with Mark wearing female clothing. Mark gets into trouble at school after displaying a pocketknife that Dan gave him to another student. Mark later tells Darlene that he was being bullied. Her family's zany personalities make Becky reluctant to allow Andrea to interview them about their genetic history before approving Becky as her surrogate.
225	3	"Roseanne Gets the Chair"	John Pasquin	Sid Youngers	April 3, 2018	1002	15.39
Roseanne resists using the stair-lift chair Dan installed due to her bad knee, believing it makes her feel old. Dan and Roseanne criticize Darlene's lax parenting after Harris acts disrespectful and is careless around the house. Roseanne punishes Harris for continually hogging the washer and dryer with used clothing she sells on Etsy. Roseanne discovers some clothing items are stolen apparel that Harris bought from other students to resell. Darlene grounds Harris, forces her to close her Etsy store, and has her hand over passwords for all her online accounts. Harris admits she is unhappy living in Lanford and wanted to earn money to move back to Chicago.
226	4	"Eggs Over, Not Easy"	John Pasquin	Morgan Murphy	April 10, 2018	1004	13.77
Andrea and Jackie accompany Becky to her medical appointment. The doctor determines Becky's eggs appear too old to be fertilized, prompting Andrea to dissolve the surrogacy contract. Darlene helps Becky with her inability to move on from Mark's death. Roseanne later consoles Becky, saying it is still possible for her to have children, and reminds her that she herself had a child in her 40s. Meanwhile, Roseanne and Jackie retrieve a rescue dog that Becky adopted but was forced to return. Jackie wants to keep it, but the animal shelter claims she is too old and the dog would outlive her. They run off with the dog.
227	5	"Darlene v. David"	Gail Mancuso	Bruce Helford	April 17, 2018	1006	13.26
David, having left Darlene and the kids years before to do humanitarian work abroad, permanently returns to Lanford. He tells Darlene he has met someone and wants a divorce. He and Darlene spend the night together and decide to reconcile. Darlene reconsiders after Roseanne tells her the reason David said he left. Meanwhile, Roseanne and Jackie are dismayed when their mother, Bev, arrives after being ejected from her nursing home for having sex with residents and spreading STDs.
228	6	"No Country for Old Women"	Gail Mancuso	Dave Caplan	May 1, 2018	1009	10.42
Roseanne and Jackie stress over Bev's care, so they agree to have their mother live with them on alternate weeks. When Bev's perpetual nagging sets them off, Bev moves into Becky's apartment; Becky wants to move to her parents' house after discovering Bev having sex with an elderly man. Jackie stops Bev from a superficial suicide attempt and admits her life is better having her mother in it. She wants Bev to stay with her. Meanwhile, Mark helps Dan build a birdhouse for a client, but feels his creative design is unappreciated; Dan explains he appreciates Mark's creativity, but it is important to give the customer what they wanted. Darlene urges Mark to find a balance between his creativity and respecting a client's wishes.
229	7	"Go Cubs"	Andrew D. Weyman	Dave Caplan	May 8, 2018	1005	10.29
The Conners struggle financially when Dan and Chuck lose an important drywall contract after the prospective client hires a cheaper company that uses illegal immigrants. The Conners' Wi-Fi is cut off just as Mary is due to Skype with her mother, Gina (who is serving in Afghanistan), forcing Roseanne to overcome her prejudices about her new Muslim neighbors and wake them at 2:00 a.m. to ask for their Wi-Fi password. They agree, understanding the circumstances. D.J. tells Dan about his difficulty re-adjusting to civilian life after the Army denied him another tour of duty. Dan proposes an idea for D.J. to earn money.
230	8	"Netflix & Pill"	Andrew D. Weyman	Betsy Borns	May 15, 2018	1007	10.73
At Dan and Roseanne's 45th anniversary dinner, DJ and Darlene mention that their credit card has reward points. Dan discovers they have enough for one night at the Radford Suites and a honey-baked ham. The hotel requires them to register a credit card to pay for incidental charges, but their card is declined. They decide to enjoy the ham at home. Also, Roseanne claims that most of her pain pills have disappeared, but Dan later discovers she has been collecting and hiding other peoples' leftover medications, even ones for unrelated ailments. He insists she schedule the surgery for her bad knee, despite the $3,000 co-pay. Meanwhile, Crystal retires from her casino job and offers to recommend Darlene or Becky as her replacement. Darlene considers it an unsuitable career move, but Dan urges her to take it. A conflict arises when Becky, stuck in a dead-end restaurant job, also wants it; Darlene takes the job but offers Becky career advice as a peace offering.
231	9	"Knee Deep"	Gail Mancuso	Bruce Rasmussen	May 22, 2018	1008	10.58
To raise money for Roseanne's knee surgery, Dan risks his and Chuck's friendship by reluctantly hiring cheaper, non-documented workers rather than Chuck's crew. Roseanne and Jackie look for items to sell to help fund the surgery. A major flood hits Lanford, filling the Conners' basement with water and causing $20,000 in damage. When a Federal state of emergency is declared that provides funding for flood victims, Dan realizes he can do the repairs himself and have enough left over for Roseanne's surgery. Meanwhile, Darlene reluctantly utilizes Becky's advice for getting better tips at her new casino job, yielding mixed results. The night before Roseanne's surgery, the family prepares all her favorite foods. With the Federal funding providing plentiful construction jobs in the area, Dan and Chuck reconcile and form a partnership.

== Production ==
=== Development ===
During Roseanne's ninth season, Roseanne Barr was in negotiations with Carsey-Werner Productions to continue playing Roseanne Conner in a spin-off. ABC, which had an option on the spinoff, initially expressed interest but withdrew from negotiations due to the high cost, with a different network poised to pick up the project. However, after failed discussions with CBS and Fox, Barr and Carsey-Werner agreed "to call it a day" and discontinue the negotiations for the spinoff. In the fall of 2008, Barr commented on what the current whereabouts of the Conners would be, saying "I've always said now that if they were on TV, DJ would have been killed in Iraq and [the Conners] would have lost their house." She refused to reveal any more information on the rest of the Conners in the hope that it "may be developed later". In December 2009, Barr posted an entry on her website regarding what a possible Roseanne reunion would be like, which included: DJ getting published, Mark dying in Iraq; David leaving Darlene for a woman half his age, Darlene coming out and meeting a woman and having a test tube baby with her, Roseanne and Jackie opening the first medical marijuana dispensary in Lanford, Dan reappearing alive after faking his death [in the series finale], and Bonnie being arrested for selling crack.

In April 2017, reports circulated that an eight-episode revival of the series was being shopped to multiple networks including ABC and Netflix, spearheaded by Sara Gilbert with Roseanne Barr and John Goodman set to reprise their roles alongside Gilbert. On May 16, 2017, ABC announced that Roseanne would return for an eight-episode tenth season set to air as a mid-season replacement during the 2017–18 television season. An additional episode was ordered on November 13, 2017, bringing the total for the season to nine episodes.

=== Casting ===
Main cast members Roseanne Barr, John Goodman, Laurie Metcalf, Lecy Goranson, Sara Gilbert and Michael Fishman return from previous seasons as Roseanne Conner, Dan Conner, Jackie Harris, Becky Conner-Healy, Darlene Conner, and D.J. Conner, respectively. In September 2017, Ames McNamara was announced to be cast as Mark Conner-Healy, Darlene and David's 8-year-old son; while Emma Kenney was cast as Harris Conner-Healy, David and Darlene's teenage daughter. Jayden Rey joined the cast in October as Mary Conner, D.J.'s daughter. Sarah Chalke, who played Becky during the later seasons of the series, appears as Andrea, a married woman who hires Becky to be her surrogate. Also returning from earlier in the series are Judy Prescott as Miss Crane, Estelle Parsons as Beverly Harris, Sandra Bernhard as Nancy Bartlett, Natalie West as Crystal Anderson, James Pickens, Jr. as Chuck Mitchell, Adilah Barnes as Anne Marie Mitchell, and Johnny Galecki as David Healy. In December 2017, it was announced that Christopher Lloyd would guest star in the revival as a love interest of Parsons' character Beverly.

=== Filming ===
Production on the season began on October 17, 2017, and concluded on December 15, in Studio City, Los Angeles.

== Release ==
=== Broadcast ===
The season began airing on March 27, 2018, on ABC in the United States, and on CTV in Canada.

=== Marketing ===
The first trailer for the season premiered during the 90th Academy Awards on March 4, 2018, which Emily Longeretta for Us Weekly commented that "the comedy wasted no time when it came to cracking jokes about its ending." Shane Lou at Today said the message of the trailer was clear: "Nothing has changed,... it's the same Roseanne, right down to her unmistakable laugh."

To promote the return of the series, ABC partnered with NASCAR to sponsor the NASCAR Xfinity Series race at Auto Club Speedway in Fontana, California and rename it the "Roseanne 300". Branding appeared throughout the track, including the pace car, infield grass logo, and in the victory lane, with Michael Fishman serving as grand marshal.

== Reception ==
=== Critical response ===
The review aggregator website Rotten Tomatoes reported a 69% approval rating for the tenth season, based on 80 reviews, with an average rating of 6.72/10. The website's critical consensus reads, "Roseanne's return finds the show's classic format, original cast, and timely humor intact, even if the latest batch of episodes suffers from sporadically uneven execution." Metacritic, which uses a weighted average, assigned a score of 69 out of 100 based on 31 critics, indicating "generally favorable" reviews.

=== Ratings ===
After one day of DVR viewing, the premiere grew by 3.4 million viewers to a total of 21.87 million, and its 18-49 rating increased by a full point to a 6.2. After three days of DVR viewing, the premiere grew by 6.7 million viewers to a total of 25.04 million, setting a three-day DVR viewership record. The 18-49 rating also grew by 2.1, rising to a 7.3, the largest three-day DVR demo increase since 2015.

Viewership and ratings per episode of Roseanne season 10
No.	Title	Air date	Rating/share (18–49)	Viewers (millions)	DVR (18–49)	DVR viewers (millions)	Total (18–49)	Total viewers (millions)
1–2	"Twenty Years to Life" / "Dress to Impress"	March 27, 2018	5.2/21	18.44	2.9	8.81	8.1	27.26
3	"Roseanne Gets the Chair"	April 3, 2018	3.9/16	15.39	2.4	6.68	6.3	22.08
4	"Eggs Over, Not Easy"	April 10, 2018	3.5/15	13.77	2.3	6.34	5.8	20.11
5	"Darlene v. David"	April 17, 2018	3.4/15	13.26	2.1	6.24	5.6	19.51
6	"No Country for Old Women"	May 1, 2018	2.6/11	10.42	2.0	5.73	4.6	16.16
7	"Go Cubs"	May 8, 2018	2.6/13	10.29	2.0	5.47	4.6	15.76
8	"Netflix & Pill"	May 15, 2018	2.6/12	10.73	1.7	5.05	4.3	15.79
9	"Knee Deep"	May 22, 2018	2.5/12	10.58	1.7	5.06	4.2	15.64
