= The Extra Man (film) =

- Theatrical release poster
- Directed by: Shari Springer Berman; Robert Pulcini
- Screenplay by: Shari Springer Berman; Robert Pulcini; Jonathan Ames
- Based on: The Extra Man by Jonathan Ames
- Produced by: Anthony Bregman; Stephanie Davis; Rebecca Rivo
- Starring: Kevin Kline; Paul Dano; Katie Holmes; John C. Reilly
- Cinematography: Terry Stacey
- Edited by: Robert Pulcini
- Music by: Klaus Badelt
- Production companies: Wild Bunch; 3 Arts Entertainment; Likely Story; Tax Credit Finance
- Distributed by: Magnolia Pictures
- Release dates: January 25, 2010 (Sundance); July 30, 2010
- Running time: 108 minutes
- Countries: United States; France
- Language: English
- Budget: $7 million
- Box office: $457,867

The Extra Man is a 2010 comedy film based on Jonathan Ames' novel of the same name. Written and directed by Shari Springer Berman and Robert Pulcini, the film stars Kevin Kline, Paul Dano, Katie Holmes, and John C. Reilly.

== Plot ==
A failed playwright, Henry Harrison, develops an odd mentor relationship with Louis Ives, a troubled, cross-dressing, aspiring writer to whom Henry sublets a room in his New York apartment. Henry teaches Louis the art of being an "extra man", accompanying and entertaining wealthy older women in their fanciful social lives. Along the way, Louis encounters an environmentally conscious co-worker, Mary Powell, and a jealous, eccentric neighbor, Gershon.

== Cast ==
- Kevin Kline as Henry Harrison
- Paul Dano as Louis Ives
- Katie Holmes as Mary Powell
- John C. Reilly as Gershon Gruen
- Patti D'Arbanville as Katherine Hart
- Alicia Goranson as Sandra
- Marian Seldes as Vivian Cudlip
- Celia Weston as Meredith Lagerfeld
- Dan Hedaya as Aresh
- Alex Burns as Brad
- Jason Butler Harner as Otto Bellman
- Lynn Cohen as Lois Huber
- John Pankow as George
- Jackie Hoffman as Pushy woman
- Jonathan Ames as Gentleman

== Production ==
Filming took place in New York City between the end of February and the beginning of April 2009.

== Release ==
The film premiered at the 2010 Sundance Film Festival and was released theatrically on July 30, 2010.

== Reception ==
On Rotten Tomatoes, the film has a 40% approval rating based on reviews from 70 critics, with an average rating of 5.5 out of 10. On Metacritic, the film has a weighted average score of 56 out of 100 based on reviews from 26 critics.

Todd McCarthy of Variety gave it a positive review and wrote: "Although too devoted to matters literary, theatrical, operatic and sexually outre to make it with general audiences, this adaptation of Jonathan Ames' novel exudes the sort of smarts and sophisticated charm specialized audiences seek."
