= Maya Lynne Robinson =

American actress, writer and producer

- Born: Cleveland, Ohio, U.S.
- Occupations: Actress, writer, producer
- Years active: 2017–present
- Website: www.mayalynne.com

Maya Lynne Robinson is an American actress, writer and producer. She is best known for her portrayal of Geena, D.J. Conner's wife, in the Roseanne television spin-off The Conners and the role of Michelle on the CBS series The Unicorn.

== Life and career ==
Robinson was born and raised in Cleveland, Ohio. In 2012, she moved from New York City to Los Angeles, where she co-starred in the play In the Red and Brown Water.

In 2018, Robinson was cast in the series regular role of Geena on the Roseanne spinoff series The Conners. Geena is D.J. Conner's wife, the mother of their child Mary and a 2nd lieutenant in the Army recently returned from a tour in Afghanistan. She portrayed Geena for one season.

In 2019, she joined the starring cast of the sitcom The Unicorn, where she portrayed Michelle.

As of 2021, Robinson had a recurring role on the NBC comedy series Grand Crew, which was cancelled in 2023.

== Filmography ==
=== Film ===
Year	Title	Role	Notes	Refs
2018	Dead Women Walking	Helen		
2022	King Tweety	Officer Siedes		

=== Television ===
Year	Title	Role	Notes	Refs
2015	HTMAST	Nysa	Web series; also creator	
2017	Mondays	Marsha	1 episode	
2018	Mom	Amanda	1 episode	
2018–2019, 2021	The Conners	Geena Williams-Conner	Main role (season 1); guest (season 3)	
2017	Gurl.	T	Web series; also co-creator	
2019–2021	The Unicorn	Michelle	Main role	
2021–2023	Grand Crew	Kristen	Recurring role	

=== Theatre roles ===
Year	Title	Role	Company / Venue	Refs
2007	Insurrection: Holding History	Izzy Mae	Theater Alliance of Washington, DC	
2012	In the Red and Brown Water	Nia	The Fountain Theatre	
2016	Echo Location	Emmy	B Street Theatre	
2017	Disgraced	Jory	Coachella Valley Repertory	
2017	Runaway Home	Eunice	The Fountain Theatre	
2018	A Streetcar Named Desire	Stella	Boston Court Pasadena Theatre Company	

== Awards and nominations ==
Year	Award	Category	Work	Result	Refs
2008	Helen Hayes Award	The Canadian Embassy Award for Outstanding Ensemble, Resident Production	Insurrection: Holding History	Nominated	
2013	Los Angeles Drama Critics Circle Award	Best Ensemble	In the Red and Brown Water	Nominated	
2013	Ovation Award	Best Ensemble in a Play	In the Red and Brown Water	Nominated	
