= List of Roseanne and The Conners characters =

The 1996–97 (season 9) cast of Roseanne (from top left to top right): Glenn Quinn as Mark Healy, Johnny Galecki as David Healy, Martin Mull as Leon Carp, Estelle Parsons as Beverly Harris and Laurie Metcalf as Jackie Harris. (From bottom left to bottom right) Michael Fishman as D.J. Conner, Sara Gilbert as Darlene Conner-Olinsky, Roseanne Barr as Roseanne Conner, John Goodman as Dan Conner and Sarah Chalke as Becky Conner

The following is a list of major characters in the television series Roseanne and its successor, The Conners.

== Family tree ==
Sonny Anderson† | Crystal Anderson Conner | Ed Conner† d. 2020 | Audrey Conner | Al Harris † d. 1993 | Bev Harris b. 1929
Lonnie Anderson | Ed Conner Jr. | Angela Conner | Louise Conner | Dan Conner b. 1951 | Roseanne Conner†; 1952 – 2018 | Neville Goldufski | Jackie Harris b. 1956 | Fred
Emilio Rodriguez | Becky Conner-Healy b. 1975 | Mark Healy†; 1973 – 2002 | David Healy | Darlene Conner-Olinsky b. 1977 | Ben Olinsky | D.J. Conner b. 1981 | Geena Williams-Conner | Jerry Conner b. 1995 | Andy Harris b. 1994
Beverly Rose Conner b. 2019 | Harris Conner-Healy b. 2003 | Mark Conner-Healy b. 2005 | Mary Conner b. 2010

== Main characters ==
Main cast and characters of Roseanne and The Conners
| Actor | Character | Roseanne | | | | | | | | | | The Conners | | | | | | |
| Actor | Character | 1 | 2 | 3 | 4 | 5 | 6 | 7 | 8 | 9 | 10 | 1 | 2 | 3 | 4 | 5 | 6 | 7 |
Starring
| Roseanne Barr | Roseanne Conner † | Main | Main | Main | Main | Main | Main | Main | Main | Main | Main | | | | | | | |
| John Goodman | Dan Conner | Main | Main | Main | Main | Main | Main | Main | Main | Main | Main | Main | Main | Main | Main | Main | Main | Main |
| Laurie Metcalf | Jackie Harris | Main | Main | Main | Main | Main | Main | Main | Main | Main | Main | Main | Main | Main | Main | Main | Main | Main |
| Sal Barone | D.J. Conner | Main (Note: Barone only appears in the pilot episode, although credited as a main cast member.) | | | | | | | | | | | | | | | | |
| Michael Fishman | D.J. Conner | Main | Main | Main | Main | Main | Main | Main | Main | Main | Main | Main | Main | Main | Main | | | |
| Sara Gilbert | Darlene Conner | Main | Main | Main | Main | Main | Main | Main | Main | Main | Main | Main | Main | Main | Main | Main | Main | Main |
| Lecy Goranson | Becky Conner (Note: Chalke portrays Andrea in the 10th season of Roseanne and the 1st season of The Conners.) | Main | Main | Main | Main | Main | | | Main | | Main | Main | Main | Main | Main | Main | Main | Main |
| Sarah Chalke | Becky Conner | | | | | | Main | Main | | Main | Recurring | Guest | | | | | | |
| Natalie West | Crystal Anderson | Also starring | Also starring | Main | Main | | Guest | | Guest | | Guest | Guest | | | | | Guest | |
| Emma Kenney | Harris Healy | | | | | | | | | Guest | Main | Main | Main | Main | Main | Main | Main | Main |
| Ames McNamara | Mark Healy | | | | | | | | | | Main | Main | Main | Main | Main | Main | Main | Main |
| Jayden Rey | Mary Conner | | | | | | | | | | Main | Main | Main | Main | Main | Main | | |
| Maya Lynne Robinson | Geena Conner (Note: Geena is portrayed by Rae'Ven Larrymore Kelly in season 7 and Xosha Roquemore in season 10.) | | | | | | | Guest | | | Guest | Main | | Guest | | | | |
| Jay R. Ferguson | Ben Olinsky | | | | | | | | | | | Recurring | Recurring | Main | Main | Main | Main | Main |
Also Starring
| George Clooney | Booker Brooks | | | | Guest | | | | | | | | | Archive | | | | |
| Estelle Parsons | Bev Harris | Guest | Guest | Guest | Guest | Also starring | Also starring | Also starring | Also starring | Also starring | Guest | Guest | | Guest | | Guest | Guest | |
| Johnny Galecki | David Healy | | | | | Also starring | Also starring | Also starring | Also starring | Also starring | Guest | Recurring | Recurring | | | | | |
| Sandra Bernhard | Nancy Bartlett | | | | | Also starring | Also starring | Guest | | | Guest | | | | | | | |
| Danielle Harris | Molly Tilden | | | | | | | | | | | | | Guest | | | | |
| Mara Hobel | Charlotte Tilden | | | | | | | | | | | | | | | | | |
| Glenn Quinn | Mark Healy † | | | Guest | Recurring | Recurring | Also starring | Also starring | Also starring | Also starring | | | | | | | | |
| Michael O'Keefe | Fred | | | | | | Also starring | Also starring | Also starring | | | | | | | | | |
| Martin Mull | Leon Carp | | | Recurring | Recurring | Guest | Recurring | Recurring | Recurring | | | | | | | | | |
| Fred Willard | Scott | | | | | | | | | | | | | | | | | |

=== Roseanne Conner ===
Roseanne Conner (née Harris) is played by Roseanne Barr. Roseanne, in a takeoff of her stand-up comedic and presumed real-life persona, is a bossy, loud, caustic, overweight, and dominant woman. She is also portrayed as smart, resourceful, and witty. She strives to control the lives of her sister, husband, children, co-workers, and friends. Despite a domineering nature, Roseanne is depicted as being a loving wife and mother who works hard and makes as much time for her husband and children as possible. She and her younger sister, Jackie, are the daughters of Beverly and Al Harris. Roseanne is married to Dan Conner and when the series begins they have three young children: Becky, Darlene, and David Jacob ("D.J."); a fourth child, Jerry Garcia, is born in the eighth season of the series.

Roseanne and Dan mostly live paycheck-to-paycheck, raising a family amid the many hardships of poverty, obesity, and domestic troubles with love and humor. Roseanne works at the Wellman Plastics factory at the beginning of the show's run and quits after a conflict with her overbearing boss, Mr. Faber; she leads a walkout that includes Jackie and other co-workers. She is intermittently unemployed and holds jobs as a fast-food restaurant employee, a telemarketer, a bartender, and a shampooer/hair sweeper/receptionist at a beauty salon. Subsequently, she works for several years as a waitress in the luncheonette at Rodbell's department store located in the Lanford Mall (much to the chagrin of her daughters Becky and Darlene, who regularly hang out there).

Unlike her slender sister, Roseanne has always had difficulty controlling her weight, inspiring an episode in which she and Dan go on a diet. Her bad dietary habits are shown to be symptomatic of her emotional health, often overeating fattening foods for comfort when stressed or merely for pleasure and reward. Roseanne is happily married, though Dan's laziness in performing household chores occasionally causes friction. A loving mother, she raises her children to be independent, individualistic, and self-sufficient. She is also close to Jackie, who is neurotic, and insecure, and has many short-term romantic relationships. Her relationship with her parents is more complicated. Her passive-aggressive mother, Bev, dotes on her two daughters, but she is often critical, interfering, and sometimes pits Roseanne and Jackie against each other by exploiting their individual insecurities. Roseanne's father, Al, initially portrayed as jovial and easy-going, is later revealed as a philandering husband and an overly-strict father who used corporal punishment to discipline his daughters over minor offenses, leaving Roseanne unable to trust men, including Dan, for many years.

Roseanne later co-owns a moderately successful restaurant, the Lanford Lunch Box, along with Jackie, and her friend Nancy. She and Jackie reluctantly accept their mother Bev as a fourth partner when more money is needed to open the business. Her annoying former Rodbell's luncheonette boss, Leon Carp, becomes a partner after Bev sells him her share as retaliation against Jackie and Roseanne for diminishing her role.

In Season 9, Roseanne and Jackie win a state lottery in excess of $108 million. At the end of the season, it is revealed that they never won the lottery and most of what previously happened on the show is actually from a fictional book Roseanne wrote. Her account of Dan having an affair was false and he actually suffered a fatal heart attack at the end of Season 8. Roseanne explains that his death was as if he had been unfaithful and left her. However, in Season 10, set twenty years later, the events of Season 9 are ret-conned out of existence. By this time, Roseanne is still married to Dan and is now a grandmother of three and posthumously of four.

In 2018, Roseanne Barr was fired from the show after she wrote a racist tweet describing Valerie Jarrett, a black woman and one of President Barack Obama's senior advisers, as the offspring of the "Muslim Brotherhood & Planet of the Apes." In the spin-off The Conners, Roseanne has died of an accidental opioid overdose. The series, which ran for seven seasons, concluded with Dan suing the company which prescribed the opioid pills for Roseanne.

In June 2010, Entertainment Weekly named Roseanne one of the 100 Greatest Characters of the Last 20 Years. In 2009, she was listed in the Top 5 Classic TV Moms by Film.com. In May 2012, she was one of the 12 moms chosen by users of iVillage on their list of "Mommy Dearest: The TV Moms You Love". AOL named her the 11th Most Memorable Female TV Character.

=== Dan Conner ===
Daniel "Dan" Conner is played by John Goodman. Dan is Roseanne's husband and father of Becky, Darlene, D.J., and Jerry. Dan is a lovable, good-natured, blue-collar family man who works as a drywall contractor. Like Roseanne, he is overweight and leads a mostly sedentary life when not working. Although Dan is a steady provider, faithful husband, and a good father, he defers most child-rearing decisions to Roseanne. While Dan is a hard-working contractor, he often shirks household duties, preferring to watch TV when at home. He often seeks refuge in the garage, tinkering on various projects to escape family stresses. In Season 1, Life and Stuff, an overworked Roseanne berates Dan for not helping enough with domestic chores. When Dan indignantly states he will cook that night's dinner, Roseanne sarcastically exclaims that he "just fixed dinner three years ago".

Dan is the only child of Ed and Audrey Conner. When Dan is around forty years old, he gains a half-brother and half-sister after Ed marries Roseanne's friend, Crystal. Dan had an uneasy childhood, and his parents' divorce and his mother's mental illness has taken an emotional toll. Dan often suppresses his feelings, which can affect his reasoning. He unfairly claimed his father, Ed, caused his mother's psychiatric problems, though he gradually accepts that Ed was blameless and actually attempted to shield his son from the truth. Their relationship remains strained, however, and in The Conners, Ed and Dan no longer communicated. Dan learns of his father's death by reading about it in the obituary column. Ed's passing reunites Dan with his estranged half-brother, Ed, Jr.

During the final episode of Season 9, which was later retconned out of existence, Roseanne reveals that the entire series was written as a fictional book based on her life and family in which she selectively altered unpleasant events. Most notably, during the final season, Dan and Roseanne are shown as briefly separating after Dan has a short-lived dalliance with another woman while in California, though he had actually died from his heart attack near the end of Season 8. Writing that he was unfaithful was to express her feelings of anger, loss, and abandonment that his death caused. Dan's potential absence from all or most of season nine prompted Phil Rosenthal of the Los Angeles Daily News to describe it as a rare occasion where ending the show would be preferred to doing without. Rosenthal described Goodman's potential absence as leaving a tremendous void, owing to his ability to make those acting with him better. The revelation that Dan actually died and the series' being a work of fiction within the show was not well received.

In Season 10, which takes place twenty years after Season 9, Dan is alive, married to Roseanne, and now a grandfather of three. Dan is still a contractor and Roseanne earns money as an Uber driver. They struggle financially while navigating the difficulties of growing older amid exorbitant drug prices and rising medical costs. They are unable to afford Roseanne's knee surgery, leading her to abuse pain-killer drugs. The couple are still involved in their grown children's lives, but their "empty nest" grows crowded when Darlene, now a single mother, moves back home with her two children after losing her publishing job in Chicago, creating new conflicts and stresses.

In The Conners, Dan is now a widower, Roseanne having died from an accidental overdose of pain pills. He deeply mourns her death, but after two years begins dating Louise, a former high-school classmate. Dan also becomes a grandfather a fourth time after Becky gives birth to a daughter. Though Dan was the father of four in Roseanne, youngest son Jerry has been retconned out of existence, and there are only three Conner children. In Season 3, Dan realizes he is too old to continue working as a contractor and retires. He begins working at the hardware store owned by Darlene's boyfriend, Ben.

In an article about television dads, The Post and Courier editor Mindy Spar discussed how '90s TV dads became goofier than dads from earlier decades, calling Dan more like one of the children than the father. IGN editor Edgar Arce called Dan Conner a prototypical everyman.

An article in the Sarasota Herald-Tribune praised Dan and Roseanne's relationship, calling it realistic and commenting that while they mock each other, viewers can feel their love while they deal with the kinds of problems real families face. Daily News editor David Bianculli stated that while they were the most entertaining and realistic couple on television, they were one of the least during their separation. Their relationship was included in TV Guide's list of the best TV couples of all time.

=== Jackie Harris ===
Marjorie Jacqueline "Jackie" Harris Goldufski is played by Laurie Metcalf. Jackie is Roseanne's younger sister by three years. She is a neurotic but a loving, devoted aunt to her nieces and nephews, and later mother to Andy.

Jackie is an intelligent, warm, highly sensitive underachiever with chronic low self-esteem. Roseanne seems to be in charge of Jackie's life, which frequently causes conflict between the two sisters; however, Jackie sometimes enjoys having Roseanne mother her, especially when she feels vulnerable. Like Roseanne, Jackie's relationship with their mother is strained, chafing under Bev's constant criticism and disapproval of her life choices. She is closer to her father, but as his past abusive behavior is revealed in later seasons, Jackie is shown as having coped by using selective denial or justifying his behavior. Jackie's character becomes more animated and colorful as the series progresses. Jackie holds numerous jobs: working in the Wellman Plastics factory for several years until the walkout, then becoming a police officer until being injured on the job, then is a truck driver before finally opening the Lanford Lunch Box with Roseanne and Nancy, and also mother Bev as a fourth partner. In Season 10, Jackie is now a life coach. In The Conners, Jackie, along with Becky, revives the old Lanford Lunch Box when the previous restaurant occupying the space closes, then struggles to keep it afloat during the COVID pandemic, showing her adaptability and perseverance. Jackie often comes up with off-the-wall ideas, but many actually work. Her romantic relationships tend to be short-term and frequently unstable, including one with Fisher, a domestic abuser.

In a plot development that was later retconned out of existence, in Seasons 6/7 Jackie married Dan's city garage co-worker Fred, who impregnated her during a one-night stand. Jackie is initially uninterested in pursuing a further romantic relationship, but gradually warms to Fred and accepts his marriage proposal. Their son, Andy, is born two months before the wedding. The marriage is short-lived, and, though Fred is a stable husband and loving father, the couple share little in common. Jackie eventually finds Fred boring, predictable, and self-centered and briefly seeks out other male companionship, though it is mostly an innocent relationship. She and Fred see a marriage counselor, but Jackie eventually decides she is happier being single. They divorce and Jackie transitions into single motherhood while maintaining a relatively amicable post-divorce relationship with her ex-husband. In the Season 10 reboot and The Conners spin-off, there is no mention of her ever being married or having a son. In The Conners Jackie, still single, briefly lived with Peter, an unemployed academic who freeloaded off her until she threw him out for cheating. In Season 3, Jackie begins dating Neville, Louise Guldofski's veterinary brother, though Jackie was initially reluctant to date anyone. They eventually marry at the end of season 4.

In Season 6, while in labor, Jackie is shocked when Bev reveals Jackie's birth name is actually Marjorie; the family began calling her Jackie because Roseanne, unable to pronounce the name Marjorie, instead called her baby sister "my Jackie". But in Season 10, Jackie introduces herself to Andrea, the woman looking to hire Becky as her surrogate, as Jacqueline. Despite Jackie's apparent flightiness in the early episodes, she is actually the backbone of the Conner/Harris family in many ways, as Roseanne admits in the last episode of Season 9, and which also reveals that Jackie, not Bev, had come out as a lesbian during the final season and that Roseanne knew, but had just always pictured her with a man.

=== Darlene Conner-Olinsky ===
Darlene Conner-Olinsky is played by Sara Gilbert. She is Dan and Roseanne's second child and younger daughter, born in 1977. Darlene, who has inherited her mother's acerbic sense of humor, is artistic, tomboyish, and socially awkward. In the early seasons, Darlene mostly focuses on sports and, though highly intelligent, underperforms academically. She often mocks her older sister Becky for being a model student, her feminine pursuits, and for chasing boys. As a teenager, Darlene grows increasingly moody and withdrawn, her malaise gradually leading to a brief bout of depression. She is a strong animal rights activist and becomes a vegetarian, which closely reflects Gilbert's real-life views. In middle school, Darlene is generally uninterested in boys though she has a few dates. As a high school freshman, she begins dating David Healy (called Kevin Healy in his first appearance, though the name was changed). David (Johnny Galecki) is the younger brother of Becky's punk boyfriend (later husband) Mark. Darlene is sarcastic and domineering like her mother, often causing the two to clash. Her strong personality dominates the meek David, who usually defers to her. Darlene is a talented aspiring writer and David is a budding graphic artist, leading them to collaborate on a graphic novel.

Darlene's goal is to become a professional writer and is talented enough to be awarded early admission and a scholarship to an arts college in Chicago. After David's application to the same school is declined, he wants Darlene to remain in Lanford. Roseanne says Darlene must first finish high school, but after learning David threatened to break up with her if she goes, she demands Darlene attend, giving Darlene an opportunity to become the writer Roseanne wanted to be. Darlene, who had decided not to attend, reveals her real reason for declining admission is because she fears failing, but finally agrees to go. At college, Darlene begins dating Jimmy while still seeing David, who initially accepts this arrangement in order to be with Darlene. When he later demands she choose between them, Darlene chooses Jimmy, though he later breaks off their relationship due to Darlene's inability to be close. Darlene realizes she still loves David and they reconcile. Darlene and David marry after Darlene becomes pregnant, giving birth to a daughter, Harris Conner-Healy. Harris is born three months premature and David and Darlene must decide whether or not to keep her on life support or allow nature to determine her fate. Harris proves strong enough to survive on her own. In the final episode of Season 9, it is revealed that Darlene was actually dating Mark, and Becky was with David, though Roseanne had written in her book that Darlene being with David made more sense. However, by the start of Season 10, which takes place twenty years later, this revelation has been retconned out of existence.

In Season 10, Darlene is now a single mother of two children, teen daughter Harris and ten-year-old son Mark. Darlene has recently lost her publishing job, forcing her to move from Chicago back to Lanford to live with Roseanne and Dan in her childhood home. She initially claimed she moved back to care for her aging parents until Roseanne discovers the real reason. David and Darlene had separated some years before, though David also soon permanently returns to Lanford, wanting to reengage in his children's lives.

In The Conners, Darlene begins a relationship with her new boss, Ben, the editor/publisher of a crime magazine called "Lock 'Em Up". Unlike David, Ben's personality is equally as strong as Darlene's. Although Darlene and David briefly consider reconciling, they agree to divorce. During a joint counseling session with David, Darlene is forced to confront and assess her domineering personality after recognizing it was an underlying factor in David leaving her. When she admits to Ben that she had also been seeing David, Ben, already aware, breaks up with her. They reconcile after Ben loses his magazine to his new corporate partners and Darlene also quits. The two decide to publish their own online crime magazine. In Season 2, they struggle to raise capital for their new venture. When Ben is unsure he has the drive and energy to start over, Darlene offers to take the initiative. In Season 3, Darlene has concerns about their relationship, fearing they may have different goals. By the end of the 4th season, Darlene marries Ben Olinsky (reoccurring character in The Conners.) They move into a house together which is built by her father, Dan.

Sara Gilbert was almost rejected for the Darlene role for "not being cute enough."

=== Becky Conner ===
Rebecca "Becky" Conner (later Healy) is played by Lecy Goranson (Sarah Chalke in seasons 6–9). Born in 1975, Becky is the eldest of Roseanne and Dan's children. Becky is introduced to the series as a pre-teen, whose primary interests are centered around makeup, fashion, and boys. While she can be self-centered and occasionally acts spoiled, she actually is the least problematic of the Conner children, maintaining high grades and rarely causing issues for her parents beyond an occasional argument. However, as Becky matures, she grows moody and rebellious, resulting in her and a friend getting drunk on Roseanne and Dan's alcohol while alone in the Conner house. She has several clean-cut boyfriends, but soon prefers dating edgier, punkish guys that Roseanne and Dan disapprove of. They especially dislike her latest boyfriend (and future husband), Mark Healy, particularly after the young couple become sexually active. Becky's ultimate rebellion comes when she is seventeen and drops out of high school to elope with Mark and move to Minneapolis.

In the year before her elopement, Becky's life was stressful. In addition to schoolwork and working as a cashier to save for a car, she was responsible for maintaining the household and tending to her younger siblings while her parents worked long hours. Her breaking point began when she learnt her parents had used her college fund to pay household bills and, finally, when the family's bike shop failed, forcing her boyfriend Mark, who worked there, to move to Minneapolis for a new job. Unwilling to be without Mark, Becky elopes with him. Unfortunately, the move did not result in any long-term financial stability and the couple returned to Lanford. Mark began working at the city garage with Dan, and Becky found a job at a restaurant called Bunz. The two lived in the Conner house before moving into a shabby mobile home at a trailer park. While Mark is content in their marriage, Becky eventually feels constrained by their growing disparities. She wants to attend college, which Mark opposes, fearing it will lead to Becky leaving him. In the final episode of Season 9, it was revealed that Becky was pregnant. In Season 10 (set twenty years later), however, Becky is childless, though she says she and Mark had tried to have children.

In Season 10, Becky, now widowed, works as a server at a Mexican restaurant in Lanford. Mark's death has left her financially unstable. Becky also appears to be somewhat emotionally stunted and immature, with Darlene commenting she often behaves and dresses like a much younger person. Becky turns to egg donation and surrogacy, hoping to earn $50,000 from an affluent couple, though she told them she is ten years younger than her actual age. Her parents strongly oppose Becky's decision, saying she is giving up her child and their grandchild, though she strongly feels she must accept the offer. When the doctor later determines Becky has little chance of conceiving, the couple seek another candidate.

Lecy Goranson played the role of Becky from Season 1 to Season 5. Goranson left the show to attend Vassar College. Becky's absence is written as her dropping out of high school to elope with Mark and moving to Minneapolis. Producers, however, wanted the character to return but, with Goranson unavailable, they recast the role with Canadian actress Sarah Chalke. Chalke appeared as Becky starting mid-Season 6 and all of Season 7. Goranson returned as Becky for Season 8. When Goranson's school schedule occasionally conflicted with her filming schedule, Chalke filled in. Goranson, not wanting to put the show through more scheduling conflicts, declined to sign on for Season 9, and Chalke returned full time. In the series revival, Goranson once again played Becky. In Season 10, Goranson, as Becky, and Chalke, as a character named Andrea, meet and comment on how much they resemble one another. Andrea hires Becky to be her surrogate, but this arrangement fails due to Becky's age (43), making it unlikely she can conceive.

In Season 1 of The Conners, which deals with life after Roseanne's death from an accidental opiate overdose, Becky (who never expected to get pregnant) announces she is expecting. The child's father, Becky's restaurant coworker Emilio, is an undocumented immigrant from Mexico and unable to help out financially, as he is a small-wage earner. With her family's support, Becky proceeds with the pregnancy.

Becky likes but does not love Emilio, though she later warms to him and accepts his being part of her and her child's lives; Dan hires him as a drywall worker at his construction business, and Jackie tutors him in English. Emilio is subsequently deported in the cliffhanger ending to Season 1. In the Season 2 premiere of The Conners, Becky gives birth to a premature girl whom she names Beverly Rose, after her grandmother and mother, respectively. Becky becomes overwhelmed at the prospect of financially providing for her baby, and returns to work too early, risking her health. Darlene and Dan convince her to move into the house with them, fixing up the basement into a comfortable living space. Much to her family's later disapproval, Becky marries Emilio while visiting him in Mexico, though it is only so he can legally return to the U.S. in two years. She is furious when he illegally returns to Lanford to be with his daughter and risks being permanently deported.

The Conners also reveals that Becky is an alcoholic; she began abusing alcohol to cope with Mark's death. She stops drinking after becoming pregnant, but suffers a relapse following Beverly Rose's birth, overwhelmed by financial challenges and failed dreams. Her family insists she goes into rehab. During a counseling session, Becky admits that one reason she drinks is her anger at herself for allowing Mark to derail her life goals.

=== D.J. Conner ===
David Jacob "D.J." Conner is played by Michael Fishman (Sal Barone in the pilot episode). Born in 1981, David, better known by his initials D.J., is the youngest of Roseanne and Dan's children and their only son until the birth of Jerry Conner, in 1995. It is noted that D.J. does well in school, though he seems less intellectually astute than Darlene and Becky. He is naïve and more boisterous than his older sisters, who frequently taunt him. In the first episode of Season 3, it is stated that while Becky and Darlene were planned pregnancies, D.J. was a "surprise". As he grows older, D.J.'s storylines deal with more mature topics such as masturbation, sexuality, racism, child abuse, and religion. A growing rebelliousness leads him to become increasingly disrespectful, skipping school, and engaging in other minor mischiefs. When D.J., not yet a teenager, steals and wrecks the family car in Season 6, Roseanne's uncontrolled anger results in her severely hitting him. Later episodes depict D.J. developing a brotherly bond with Becky's husband Mark, who often dispenses incorrect or inappropriate advice. D.J. later shows an artistic side and develops an interest in filmmaking. He wants to videotape Darlene giving birth but continually faints while attempting to watch a childbirth video to prepare. He was among the few characters whose storylines were unaltered in the final episode of Season 9, which has since been ret-conned out of existence.

In Season 10, D.J. recently retired from the military and returned home after serving in Syria. He struggles to adapt to civilian life for which he sought counseling. He is the primary parent to his pre-adolescent daughter, Mary, while his wife, Geena Williams Conner, is still serving in the military abroad. D.J. lands a job with a vending machine company, improving his financial situation, but after receiving a promotion, he works long hours, often away from Lanford. He agrees to allow Mary to stay at the Conner house during the week so she will not be home alone.

=== Crystal Anderson-Conner ===
Crystal Anderson-Conner is played by Natalie West. Crystal is a close friend of Roseanne, having gone to high school with her and Jackie and later working together with them at Wellman Plastics. A mild-mannered, good-hearted woman, Crystal's kindness is often taken advantage of, even by Roseanne at times. Though Crystal is not oblivious to others using her, she seldom asserts herself, fearing she might lose others' favor or be perceived as unladylike.

Crystal's most poignant hallmark is her dating troubles. At the beginning of the series, she has been married three times. Both her marriages to Rusty and Travis, were fairly short and ended in divorce. (However, in season 1, episode 5, it is mentioned that she was widowed at 18.) Her third husband Sonny, the father of her son Lonnie, was killed in a bridge construction accident. After, Crystal endures years of bad relationships before gradually kindling a romance with Dan's father Ed, much to Roseanne's surprise and Dan's consternation. When Crystal and Ed become engaged in Season 3, she reveals she is pregnant. Dan is initially unhappy with either development, further straining his already-difficult relationship with his father. Crystal gives birth to Ed Junior, better known as Little Ed; the following year, she gives birth to her daughter, Angela.

Crystal made a few appearances in several revival-era episodes in 2018 and 2019. It is unmentioned if she is still married to Ed Conner. However, in The Conners, when Ed, Sr. dies, he was living alone in rather shabby circumstances.

Little is known about Crystal's background, other than her mother forcing her to leave home at 16 and that she married at 17, shortly after graduating high school, only to be widowed at 18. Although Crystal still mourns Sonny's death, she acknowledges that she always knew he was cheating on her. Crystal speaks with a Southern accent despite being a Lanford native; her explanation is that her father was from Arkansas.

=== Harris Conner-Healy ===
Harris Conner-Healy is played by Emma Kenney. She was born premature and was not expected to survive. Darlene names her Harris Conner-Healy as a tribute to all of the strong women in her family ("Harris" is Roseanne's maiden name) in the hopes that she'd have the same strength to survive.

The elder of Darlene's two children, Harris is now a teenager who inherited her mother and grandmother's sarcastic humor. Having grown up in Chicago, Harris is unhappy about moving to Lanford and is resentful and hostile towards her family members. As Harris continuously acts indifferent to the needs of others in the household, Roseanne does what Darlene has not: she confronts Harris about her disrespectful behavior. Though Darlene is initially upset, she accepts Roseanne's actions as justified when she discovers that Harris has been selling stolen goods on Etsy to raise money to move back to Chicago. While Darlene is sympathetic to Harris's unhappiness, she exerts more control over her daughter's life, grounding her and demanding passwords to all of her social media accounts.

There is some discrepancy in the series continuity with regard to the character's age. Darlene announced she was pregnant in a 1996 episode during season 8 of Roseanne, and Harris was born in a 1997 episode during season 9. This would make Harris 21, not a teenager, at the start of season 10 in 2018. Note that virtually everything that happened in seasons 7-9 of Roseanne—other than Harris' birth—has been retconned out of existence in the show's universe, and there is no reason to assume that the date of Harris' birth is not affected by this retcon.

=== Mark Conner-Healy ===
Mark Conner-Healy is played by Ames McNamara. The younger of Darlene's two children, Mark is a 10-year-old boy with a strong interest in fashion. His interest in things traditionally feminine, such as wearing makeup and skirts, is somewhat worrisome to his grandparents, with Roseanne worried that Mark will be bullied by his narrow-minded peers and Dan feeling that he needs to persuade the youngster to take on more masculine traits. Noticing a classmate make a snide comment to Mark on his first day at school in Lanford, Roseanne threatens his classmates by telling them she is a witch, while Dan gives Mark a pocket knife, which ultimately results in him being called to the principal's office and sent home from school for the day, much to Darlene's chagrin. Despite Roseanne and Dan's concerns, they express support and love for him. Mark is named after his deceased uncle, Mark Healy.

=== Mary Conner ===
Mary Conner is played by Jayden Rey. Mary is D.J. and Geena's daughter. Mary is named after her deceased great-great-grandmother, Nana Mary. In Season 3, D.J. begins a new job requiring him to work long hours and often in neighboring towns. Although Geena and D.J.'s friends are checking on her throughout the day, Mary tells Darlene she is lonely. Darlene and Becky decide to have her live at the Conner house during the week without first asking D.J. He is initially angry, but relents when Mary says she wants to stay.

=== Geena Williams-Conner ===
Geena Williams-Conner is played by Maya Lynne Robinson (Rae'Ven Larrymore Kelly in season 7 and Xosha Roquemore in season 10). The African-American wife of D.J. and mother of Mary; she is, like D.J., a military veteran.

The character was introduced in a 1994 Roseanne episode wherein D.J. must kiss her for a school play, but is reluctant to do so because she is black (race). D.J. overcomes his prejudices and kisses her for the play; she is not seen on the original show again.

In the Season 10 revival, it is revealed that Geena had married D.J., and while D.J. is home raising their daughter, she is still an active-duty soldier.

She was a main character in season one of The Conners, having been discharged from the military after a tour in Afghanistan. In Season 2, she is called into active duty again. In an interview with MEAWW, Robinson explained that the show did not have her character return as a regular, and that she was joining another sitcom as a main character in The Unicorn.

== Other major characters ==
=== Nancy Bartlett ===
Nancy Lynn Bartlett is played by Sandra Bernhard. Nancy is a part owner of the Lanford Lunch Box. She marries Arnie Thomas, but — after he eventually leaves her — she comes out as a lesbian. She frequently is seen dating women; her first girlfriend Marla is played by Morgan Fairchild. Nancy is never ashamed of her promiscuity, nor does she ever show any self-consciousness about her unusual behavior. She is one of the most self-confident characters in the series, often even more than Roseanne. Her tendency toward self-absorption seems to only be quelled while dating a woman or being around Jackie. Nancy turns out to be a loyal good friend to both Roseanne and Jackie throughout the series; however, she doesn't hesitate to reprimand them for their selfishness and cruelty when they treat their mother, Bev, so harshly that Bev ends up crying about it for days afterward while Nancy gives her support.

Nancy appeared in a revival-era episode in 2018 in season 10, but did not appear on The Conners.

=== Leon Carp ===
Leon Carp is played by Martin Mull. Leon, originally as Roseanne's boss at Rodbell's Luncheonette and later as her business partner in The Lanford Lunchbox, he is portrayed as a foe to Roseanne; although they have a contentious relationship at times, Leon gradually becomes a close friend of the Conners, ultimately becoming a surrogate family member. As a gay man, he is occasionally seen dating many men and having romantic troubles; however, he later marries his life partner Scott (Fred Willard) in a very public ceremony. In the ninth season, they visit the Conner residence bearing gifts for Darlene and David's new baby, Harris, proclaiming themselves as the infant's Aunt Scott and Aunt Leon. Near the end of the episode, they announce their plans to adopt a little girl. Leon's role in the series expands significantly in the eighth and ninth seasons, as he is featured in more episodes. He is especially upset when Roseanne wins the lottery, but Roseanne and Jackie end up relinquishing control of the restaurant to Leon and Nancy. Leon is a Republican, and holds George Bush in high regard. He also is shown throughout the series' run to be a fan of Liza Minnelli, as well as Broadway musicals.

Leon did not appear in season 10, nor did he appear on the spin-off series.

=== Chuckie Mitchell ===
Chuck "Chuckie" Mitchell is played by James Pickens Jr. Chuckie is married to Anne Marie Mitchell and is friends with Dan and Roseanne from high school, having played football with Dan. They reignite their friendship after a chance encounter in the season 3 episode, "Bird Is the Word". After, he and Dan regularly play poker together, watch football, as well as go into business together with Bob and Roger. His being of African-American descent is partially why they're approved for a construction job at a prison. He and Anne-Marie have one child, Chuckie Jr. He remains close to Dan throughout the series and also in "The Conners."

=== Anne-Marie Mitchell ===
Anne-Marie Mitchell is played by Adilah Barnes. Anne-Marie is married to Chuckie Mitchell, whom she met in high school. She recognizes Roseanne as their children are in trouble for giving the middle finger during a class photo, and they reminisce about spending time being mischievous in high school. After her introduction in the season three episode, "Bird Is the Word" she is seen regularly spending time with Roseanne and Jackie and their friend group gossiping. She has one child with her husband, Chuckie Jr. She remains friends with Roseanne and the family throughout the series and follow-up series "The Conners." Her sense of humor is similar to Rosanne's in the series.

=== Ed Conner ===
Ed Conner is played by Ned Beatty. Ed is Dan's father, a charming traveling salesman who always brings presents for the grandchildren. Dan has a troubled history with his father, and Roseanne tries to keep the peace between the two. The family likes Ed, but Dan grew up feeling neglected with Ed seldom being home and his mother's mental illness, in addition to verbal slights that Ed targets towards Dan (e.g., when Dan questions Ed dating Crystal, Ed makes a rude crack about Dan being "interested" in Crystal). It usually takes little to no time for Dan to become annoyed by his father's presence. All this was unknown to Dan until Crystal revealed it to Roseanne. Ed hoped to provide Dan with at least one stable parent as he would often be gone on sales trips during Dan's adolescence. He wants to learn from his past actions and be a better father and husband. He loves his son despite their troubled relationship, and also loves the rest of his family. He marries Crystal and has two children with her (Ed Jr. and Angela), who are significantly younger than their half-brother, Dan. He is said to have died in The Conners; it appears he was no longer with Crystal and was living alone.

=== Jerry Conner ===
Jerry Garcia Conner is played by Cole Roberts and Morgan Roberts. Jerry is the youngest of Roseanne and Dan's children, born in 1995 when the two are in their forties. Jerry's conception presented a struggle for Roseanne and Dan, who previously never experienced fertility issues. He was named after musician Jerry Garcia of the Grateful Dead, who had a fatal heart attack during Roseanne's pregnancy and of whom she and Dan were fans.

The decision to add a pregnancy storyline to the series coincided with Roseanne Barr's real-life pregnancy with her son, Buck Thomas. Barr, like her character, struggled with fertility, though Barr ultimately resorted to fertility drugs to conceive while her character became pregnant naturally. Initially, it was planned that the new cast addition would be a daughter, but when Barr gave birth to a boy, she decided the Conners should have a son instead, wanting her on-screen child's sex to match her newborn child's. Once it was decided the baby would be a boy, Barr named the character after Jerry Garcia and intended to have Roseanne give birth at a Grateful Dead concert. However, plans for a concert birth were scrapped when Garcia died unexpectedly.

Because he was so young, Jerry did not play a significant role in the series' initial run. Jerry never appeared in Season 10, nor did he appear on The Conners. In a season 10 episode, Roseanne briefly alluded to Jerry being on a fishing boat in Alaska, hence his absence. However, after that there was no mention of Jerry whatsoever, and it became apparent that the character—along with much of seasons 6 through 9 -- was simply retconned out of existence. In The Conners, various characters mentioned that there are only three Conner children.

=== Fred ===
Fred is played by Michael O'Keefe. Fred is a mechanic who works at the city garage with Dan when he is introduced to Jackie, leading to a one-night stand, accidental pregnancy, and subsequent marriage. After much encouragement, Jackie eventually warms to Fred and accepts him as the father of her child and therefore a part of their lives. At first, Fred assumes Jackie rebuffs him because she thinks he fails to understand she was previously in an abusive relationship, in addition to her dysfunctional childhood. Being conventional, Fred is somewhat mystified by the Conners' and Harris' offbeat ways and finds the inner workings of Jackie's eccentric family confusing. Their disparate personalities eventually strain his and Jackie's marriage. Despite attempts to make their marriage work and seeing a counselor, Jackie and Fred realize they have too little in common and divorce. They maintain a relatively cordial post-divorce relationship and share custody of their son, Andy.

Fred did not appear, nor was he mentioned, in the revival series or in The Conners. His son Andy was retconned out of existence, and Fred appears to have suffered the same fate.

=== Andy Harris ===
Andy Harris is Jackie and Fred's son, born in 1994 on the episode "Labor Day". Jackie breastfeeds Andy at the altar while marrying Fred ("Altar Egos"). Andy was the ringbearer at Darlene and David's wedding ("The Wedding"). Jackie occasionally dressed him in outfits Fred deemed to be feminine. D.J. made it a point to spend time with Andy because they were the only younger males in the family until Jerry's birth. Cousins Andy and Jerry took naps together in the same crib when they were babies.

Andy has been retconned out of existence in The Conners, with producer Bruce Helford explaining that the new show's producers have chosen to deliberately ignore certain developments of later seasons of Roseanne—including Andy's birth.

=== Bev Harris ===
Beverly Lorraine "Bev" Harris is played by Estelle Parsons. Beverly is the mother of Roseanne and Jackie, the wife of Al, and the daughter of Nana Mary. She has a half-sister named Sonya. Overbearing, critical, and shrill, she annoys her family members. She often nags them with a high-pitched whiny voice, often with good intentions but presenting them in an inappropriate manner. The family (especially Jackie) avoids spending time with Bev, and she is quick to inadvertently criticize how people run their lives. After the family plays back-and-forth tricks on each other in one Halloween episode, Roseanne ultimately prevails by faking a phone conversation in front of frantic Dan, pretending that Bev is coming for a three-week visit. Bev is traditional and conservative, as opposed to her daughters' more liberal and feminist philosophies. She is generous with the money she receives from her divorce settlement, often giving financial gifts to the family or to bail them out. She provides the seed money for Roseanne and Jackie's business venture, the Lanford Lunch Box, and later provides additional funding as a fourth partner. She is later forced into becoming a silent partner when Roseanne and Jackie are unable to work harmoniously with her. As revenge, Bev sells her share of the restaurant to Roseanne's disliked ex-boss, Leon Carp, making him their new partner. During the show's ninth season, which has subsequently been entirely retconned out of the series continuity, Bev comes out as a lesbian (according to one of Roseanne's fictional twists on her family, along with winning the lottery). In the finale, Roseanne states that it is her sister, Jackie, not Bev, who is a lesbian. This has also been retconned out of the series continuity.

From what is known of Bev's childhood and marriage, her life was emotionally difficult, plagued with instability and neglect. Her unrestrained mother Mary put her personal freedom ahead of her children. As a result of her promiscuity, Mary is uncertain about who Bev's father was. As a young woman, Bev found herself pregnant out of wedlock, as her mother had been. Unlike her mother, Bev married her baby's father, Al Harris. Their marriage lasted several decades, but Al treated their two daughters harshly and cheated on Bev, having a secret mistress for twenty years. Disappointed in her life, Bev grew bitter in her old age, making her critical of others.

Bev returned in season 10 of Rosanne, and in the subsequent follow-up series The Conners. In season 10 of Roseanne, Bev was kicked out of her retirement community for sleeping with others and spreading STIs; Jackie and Roseanne alternated keeping care of her at their respective homes. Darlene was granted power of attorney over Bev's finances, until late in the second season of The Conners, when the 94-year-old Bev, angry that Darlene allowed Jackie and Becky to re-open the Lunch Box restaurant (an asset Bev somehow secretly retained), revoked Darlene having power of attorney.

=== David Healy ===
David Maurice Healy is played by Johnny Galecki. David is Mark Healy's younger brother. He first appeared in "The Bowling Show" (episode 4.14). Whereas Mark was initially a rebellious delinquent, David is friendly and respectful to the Conners. He is shy, polite, thoughtful, sensitive, soft-spoken, artistic, and intelligent. Much of his passive behavior results from his difficult home life and his mother's abusive behavior. He is romantically involved with Darlene, becoming the submissive partner. They also collaborate artistically, with David illustrating graphic novels that Darlene writes. His sweet manner endears him to the Conners, who eventually consider him as part of the family and jokingly refer to him as being more welcome than Darlene. He moves in with the Conners after Roseanne, herself a victim of child abuse, witnesses how abusive David's mother is. David and Darlene break up three times throughout the series, each for a successively longer period of time, but always reunite. After Darlene becomes pregnant, she and David married. In the series finale, Roseanne reveals in her writing that David had actually been dating Becky in "real life", and that Roseanne simply wrote his relationship as being with Darlene because she felt it made more sense.

The series finale is retconned for season 10, where it is revealed that David and Darlene have been separated for some years and David has been away, traveling and doing volunteer work abroad, leaving Darlene to raise their two children, Harris and Mark, as a single mother. David eventually returns to Lanford and tells Darlene he wants to reenter his children's lives. After sleeping together, both Darlene and David consider reconciling until Roseanne tells Darlene the reason David said he left their marriage. She says it would be bad for their children, who resent David being an absent father. At Dan's urging, David agrees to get his life settled before seeing the kids again.

In The Conners, David is working at Trader Joe's and has moved in with a free-spirited woman named Blue. Darlene is furious to discover that during the kids' first weekend staying with David, Blue allowed Harris' boyfriend to sleep over and she lost her virginity. David defensively says he was working and was unaware, but Darlene demands he be a more attentive father. David eventually breaks up with Blue because she wants children. David and Darlene began sleeping together again while Darlene is also in a relationship with Ben. Darlene decides she wants to be with Ben, and she and David finally agree to divorce. Ben, already knowing the two were seeing each other, breaks up with Darlene, though he eventually forgives her. David began seeing a therapist, and, during a joint session with Darlene, reveals he feels Darlene never treated him as an equal and caused him to leave her.

When David was first introduced to the series, his name was Kevin, though it was subsequently changed to David. While applying for college, he uses his full name, David Maurice Healy. As a show inside joke, Roseanne comments in Season 6, "David's not even his real name. Darlene made it up!" However, Barr had reportedly wanted to name the character David from the beginning, but the idea was rejected as Galecki was starring on another show, Billy as a character named David.

=== Mark Healy ===
Mark Healy is played by Glenn Quinn. Mark begins dating Becky when she is about sixteen years old, much to the Conners' consternation. He comes from a dysfunctional family. Mark is mechanically inclined, but unlike his younger brother, David, he is not very intelligent, is a poor student, and has few goals in life. Mark elopes with Becky when she is only seventeen. She drops out of high school to be with him when he leaves town after losing his job at Dan's failed bike shop. They move to Minneapolis for his new mechanic's job. Despite Mark's tough-guy image and rebel persona, he is only occasionally seen engaging in minor criminal activity, such as underage drinking and using a fake I.D. Roseanne and Dan initially detest Mark, considering him a disrespectful and condescending punk. They grudgingly tolerate him as Becky's boyfriend and later son-in-law. Mark's choice to ride a British Triumph motorcycle rather than an American Harley-Davidson did cause particular tension with Dan. However, Dan comes to respect Mark's work ethic and hired him as a mechanic at his bike shop and later at the Lanford city garage. Mark's personality changes over the course of the series — starting off as a rebellious delinquent but ultimately softening and proving himself to be a caring and responsible (though comedically dull-witted) husband to Becky. He is also a loyal brother, though Mark enjoys tormenting the more intelligent David and mocks his artistic and sensitive personality. Unlike David, who was warmly welcomed as a family member, Roseanne and the rest of the family only grudgingly accept Mark into their clan while still insulting him. Mark is not ungrateful to the Conners, however, and reveals to David, just before David's wedding to Darlene, that he considers Dan and Roseanne as being their parents now. Mark and David have two younger sisters, Lisa and Nikki, who are briefly seen in the Season 5 episode, "No Place Like Home for The Holidays".

In season 10, Mark is now deceased, leaving Becky a financially-strapped and lonely widow. Actor Glenn Quinn had died between the original series and the revival, and it was decided not to recast his role. No further information was initially given about when and how Mark died, though Darlene and David's son, who was about ten years old during Season 10, was named in Mark's memory. It is eventually revealed in a Season 3 episode of The Conners that Mark was killed in a motorcycle crash.

=== Nana Mary ===
Nana Mary is played by Shelley Winters. Nana Mary is Beverly's mother and Roseanne and Jackie's grandmother, and first appears at a family barbecue in season three. She has another daughter named Sonya. She makes several appearances from season three onward, mostly during family occasions. She is a brash but caring, outspoken, lovable retiree who gambles with her grandchildren. Unlike Bev, she is popular with the family. She also disagrees with Bev in certain situations, such as siding with Jackie when Bev urges her to marry Fred, and revealing that she had two abortions, upsetting Bev. She outsmarts Bev and torments her, much to the amusement of Roseanne and Jackie, who usually endure the same treatment from Bev. Her character is often a comic relief for the family, as well as offering a balance between Roseanne and Jackie's relationship with their mother, and Bev's relationship with Nana Mary. She was promiscuous in her youth and claims that as a globe-trotting free spirit she knew Pablo Picasso, Louis Armstrong, Ernest Hemingway, Fidel Castro, and Meyer Lansky, among others. Mary had Bev with another man before marrying her deceased husband, Marvin. She tells Bev she was very young when she gave birth, admits to not knowing who the father is, and avoided the subject until Bev demanded to finally know. Mary is a fan of a local radio call-in show that revolves around sex: "If I don't call, they worry," she claims. Nana Mary's last appearance is midway through season nine, in which she finally has a heart-to-heart with Bev, thus closing the story on their relationship. Despite her absence, Mary appears at other family occasions, including the birth of her great-great-granddaughter. In the reboot and spin-off, D.J. and Geena's daughter is named after Nana Mary, who has since died.

=== Arnie Thomas ===
Arnold Shep "Arnie" Thomas is played by Tom Arnold. Arnie is an overweight, hot-tempered but jovial friend of Dan. Originally, he was written as a relative stranger to both Roseanne and Jackie, although this was later retconned, and he was subsequently written as having gone to high school with them. He frequently cheats on the women he dates and is occasionally ill-mannered. However, Arnie always tries to be a good friend to Dan. He marries Nancy but leaves her, claiming to have been abducted by aliens (later played upon in the fourth-season finale's end-credit sketch, where he is seen conversing with aliens on a spaceship). Before he and Nancy are engaged, he has a one-night stand with a drunk Jackie, who wakes up with no memory of their night together. Arnie is often seen wearing a yellow University of Iowa sweatshirt (Tom Arnold attended the University of Iowa in real life). He is last seen in season 5, where he unsuccessfully tries to win Nancy back, even after learning that she is a lesbian. Tom Arnold appears in the ending credits of a later episode but is now playing Jackie Thomas (in his role on The Jackie Thomas Show), and none of the characters know him.

== Minor/recurring characters ==
Main cast and characters of Roseanne and The Conners
| Actor | Character | Roseanne | | | | | | | | | | The Conners | | | | | | |
| Actor | Character | 1 | 2 | 3 | 4 | 5 | 6 | 7 | 8 | 9 | 10 | 1 | 2 | 3 | 4 | 5 | 6 | 7 |
|---|---|---|---|---|---|---|---|---|---|---|---|---|---|---|---|---|---|---|
| Charlayne Woodard | Vonda Green | Recurring | Guest | | | | | | | | | | | | | | | |
| Anne Faulkner | Sylvia Foster | Recurring | Guest | | | | | | | | | | | | | | | |
| Evelina Fernandez | Juanita Herrara | Recurring | Guest | | | | | | | | | | | Recurring | | | | |
| Judy Prescott | Miss Crane | Guest | | | | | | | | | Guest | | | | | | | |
| Josh C. Williams | Lonnie Anderson | Guest | | | | | | | | | | | | | | | | |
| Luke Edwards | Lonnie Anderson | | Guest | | | | | | | | | | | | | | | |
| Kristopher Kent Hill | Lonnie Anderson | | | Guest | Guest | | Guest | | | | | | | | | | | |
| Jared Rushton | Chip Lang | Recurring | | | | | | | | | | | | | | | | |
| Eric Allan Kramer | Bobo | Guest | | | | | | | | | | | | | | Guest | | |
| Ned Beatty | Ed Conner | Guest | Guest | Guest | | | Guest | | | | | | | | | | | |
| William Sadler | Dwight | Guest | | | | | | | | | | | | | | | | |
| John Randolph | Al Harris | Guest | Guest | | | | | | | | | | | | | | | |
| Tom Arnold | Arnie Thomas | | Recurring | Recurring | Recurring | Guest | | | | | | | | | | | | |
| Stephen Dorff | Jimmy Meltrigger | | Recurring | | | | | | | | | | | | | | | |
| Ann Wedgeworth | Audrey Conner | | Guest | | | | | | | | | | | | | | | |
| Debbie Reynolds | Audrey Conner | | | | | | | | | Guest | | | | | | | | |
| Debra Mooney | Meg Wellman | | Recurring | | | | | | | | | | | | | | | |
| Elizabeth Franz | Marsha | | Recurring | | | | | | | | | | | | | | | |
| Lori Tan Chinn | Iris | | Recurring | | | | | | | | | | | | | | | |
| Melora Walters | Debbie | | Recurring | | | | | | | | | | | | | | | |
| Brian Kerwin | Gary Hall | | Guest | Guest | | | | | | | | | | | | | | |
| Jay O. Sanders | Ziggy | | Guest | Guest | | | | | | | | | | | | | | |
| James Pickens, Jr. | Chuckie Mitchell | | | Guest | Recurring | Recurring | Guest | Guest | Guest | Guest | Guest | Guest | Recurring | Guest | Guest | | | |
| Adilah Barnes | Anne-Marie Mitchell | | | Recurring | Recurring | Recurring | | | Guest | Guest | Guest | | | | | | | |
| Bonnie Bramlett | Bonnie Watkins | | | Recurring | Recurring | | | | | | | | | | | | | |
| Danton Stone | Jerry Bowman | | | Guest | Recurring | | | | | | | | | | | | | |
| Meagen Fay | Kathy Bowman | | | Guest | Recurring | | | | | | | | Guest | | | | | |
| Troy Davidson | Todd Bowman | | | Guest | Guest | | | | | | | | | | | | | |
| Shelley Winters | Nana Mary | | | Guest | Guest | Guest | Guest | Guest | Guest | Guest | | | | | | | | |
| Noel Fisher | Ed Conner Jr. | | | | Recurring | | | | | | | | Recurring | | | | | |
| Dan Butler | Art | | | | Recurring | | | | | | | | | | | | | |
| Matt Roth | Fisher | | | | | Recurring | | | | | | | | | | | | |
| Morgan Fairchild | Marla | | | | | Recurring | | | | | | | | | | | | |
| Wings Hauser | Ty Tilden | | | | | Recurring | | | | | | | | | | | | |
| Joseph Gordon-Levitt | George | | | | | Guest | Guest | Guest | | | | | | | | | | |
| [unknown] | Andy Harris | | | | | | Guest | Recurring | Recurring | Recurring | | | | | | | | |
| John McConnell | Bob | | | | | | | Recurring | Recurring | Guest | | | | | | | | |
| Danny Masterson | Jimmy Phillips | | | | | | | Guest | | | | | | | | | | |
| Traci Lords | Stacey Flagler | | | | | | | Recurring | | | | | | | | | | |
| Buck Thomas | Jerry Conner | | | | | | | | Recurring | Recurring | Photos Only | | | | | | | |
| Stan Freberg | Mr. Parkin | | | | | | | | Recurring | | | | | | | | | |
| Heather Matarazzo | Heather | | | | | | | | | Recurring | | | | | | | | |
| Juliette Lewis | Blue | | | | | | | | | | | Recurring | | | | | | |
| Stephen Monroe Taylor | Dwight | | | | | | | | | | | Guest | Recurring | Guest | | | | |
| Matthew Broderick | Peter | | | | | | | | | | | Recurring | | | | | | |
| Rene Rosado | Emilio Rodriguez | | | | | | | | | | | Recurring | Recurring | Recurring | Guest | Guest | | |
| Katey Sagal | Louise Goldufski | | | | | | | | | | | Guest | Recurring | Recurring | Recurring | Recurring | Recurring | Recurring |
| Charlotte Sanchez | Beverlly Rose Conner | | | | | | | | | | | | Recurring | Recurring | Recurring | Recurring | Recurring | Recurring |
| Eliza Bennett | Odessa | | | | | | | | | | | | Recurring | | | | | |
| Nat Faxon | Neville Goldufski | | | | | | | | | | | | | Recurring | Recurring | Recurring | Recurring | Recurring |
| Alexandra Billings | Robin Shetsky | | | | | | | | | | | | | Recurring | Guest | Guest | | |
| Milo Manheim | Josh | | | | | | | | | | | | | Recurring | | | | |
| Candice Bergen | Barb Olinsky | | | | | | | | | | | | | Recurring | | | | |
| Patton Oswalt | Don Blansky | | | | | | | | | | | | | Guest | Guest | | | |
| Darien Sills-Evans | Mikey | | | | | | | | | | | | | Guest | Guest | | | |
| Brian Austin Green | Jeff | | | | | | | | | | | | | Guest | Guest | | | |
| Tony Cavalero | Aldo | | | | | | | | | | | | | | Recurring | | | |
| Travis Burnett | Logan | | | | | | | | | | | | | | Recurring | | | |
| Matt Walsh | Professor Glenn | | | | | | | | | | | | | | Recurring | | | |
| Sean Astin | Tyler | | | | | | | | | | | | | | | Guest | Recurring | Recurring |
| Seth Green | Chad | | | | | | | | | | | | | | | | | Recurring |

=== Other family members ===
- Audrey Conner (Ann Wedgeworth and Debbie Reynolds) – She is the mother of Dan Conner, and the ex-wife of Ed Conner. In Season 2 she is introduced in "We Gather Together" as a friendly, eccentric brunette woman who loves her son and her new boyfriend, as well as her successful career owning a travel agency. It's later revealed that she has a history of mental illness which Dan's father hid from him. She returns in person in season 9, angry at her son for putting her away, seemingly trying to kill him. Her nurse at the mental institution is who Dan had a relationship with while being married to Roseanne. Note, however, that as almost all of season 9 was retconned out of existence, this no longer can be assumed to be 'true' within the show's continuity. (Initially, Dan's affair was revealed to be false, and part of a story Roseanne was writing as a way to deal with Dan's heart-attack death in the previous season. By season 10, even Dan's death was retconned away.)
- Al Harris (John Randolph) – Al is portrayed as Roseanne and Jackie's henpecked yet humorous father with a knack for telling knock-knock jokes. Al initially appears to have a good relationship with his daughters, especially Jackie, and despite having more in common with her mother, Roseanne finds her father more bearable to be around. Randolph made two appearances as Al Harris during the show's first two seasons. In season four, however, his character changes dramatically. After being unable to secure Randolph for future shows, Al was written out of the series. It is revealed at the 1991 Thanksgiving dinner episode that the absent Al has had a mistress for over 20 years, for which Bev eventually divorces him. Around this time Roseanne Barr was in a public battle with her real-life parents, claiming that both had physically and sexually abused her. Barr insisted that parental abuse be incorporated into the series storyline, so it is revealed that her father was physically abusive to both her and Jackie, who lived in fear of him for most of their childhood. Upon his death, Roseanne meets with his mistress, Joan, who is unaware of Al's abusive behavior, as he had led her to believe that Roseanne and Jackie were ungrateful daughters despite his doing so much for them. At Al's funeral, after privately reading him a list of the things she hates him doing to her and Jackie, Roseanne thanks her father for giving her his humorous nature.

=== Wellman Plastics ===
All characters below appear in the first season and part of the second season before being written out altogether. Clooney would make one more appearance in a season four episode.

- Booker Brooks (George Clooney) – The original foreman at Wellman. Booker wasn't always taken seriously by the workers, but compared to their future boss, Roseanne and the others appreciate him more. He dated Jackie for a while, and they tried to keep it a secret. He set the quotas at Wellman at 5,500, much lower than the 8,000 set by their next boss Keith Faber (Fred Thompson).
- Vonda Green (Charlayne Woodard, credited as Charlaine Woodard)- Spirited and perky friend of Jackie and Roseanne, also has a great singing voice.
- Sylvia Foster (Anne Faulkner)- Older Wellman employee working there since the late 1950s, she occasionally hangs out with Jackie, Roseanne, and the rest of the gang at the Lobo. Has a husband named Joe who is hard of hearing.
- Juanita Herrara (Evelina Fernandez)- Hispanic co-worker who after leaving Wellman with the rest of the gang opens a successful small business in Lanford with her husband Emilio and their teenage son.
- Meg Wellman (Debra Mooney) – Owner of the Wellman factory, who believes she and Roseanne are good friends. Unaware she's getting their names wrong, she comically refers to Roseanne as "Roxanne Conway" and Jackie as Janet. Accidentally hits Roseanne's car with her car in one episode.

=== Art's Beauty Shop ===
All characters below appear in the show's second season only, when Roseanne takes a job as a receptionist and shampoo girl at Art's Beauty Salon.

- Marsha (Elizabeth Franz) – Good friend of Crystal's who is the owner of Art's Beauty Salon named after her late husband who she was only married to for eleven months between 1959 and 1960. Marsha hysterically quotes Arthur throughout her run on the show despite the fact that he has been gone nearly thirty years leading Roseanne to quip that maybe Marsha would not miss him so much if they had been married longer.
- Iris (Lori Tan Chinn) – Vietnamese beautician at the salon. Comically makes jokes throughout her run on the show about being a Vietnamese refugee held captive before emigrating to the United States. Often makes acerbic remarks about people being blown away by gun mortar attacks, which she reveals to Roseanne is her comic way of letting off steam. Chinn and Barr had appeared together in the 1989 movie She-Devil.
- Debbie (Melora Walters) – Manicurist at the salon who is a young naive newlywed.

=== Rodbell's Department Store ===
- Bonnie Watkins (Bonnie Bramlett, credited as Bonnie Sheridan) – Roseanne's coworker at Rodbell's, during season three and four. She has a daughter who lives in Oregon and enjoys traveling by motorcycle with her husband Duke (David Crosby). Bonnie had a drinking problem along with her husband Duke early on in her life that she has since brought under control.

=== Neighbors ===
- The Bowman family are the Conners' neighbors between season 3 and 4 who relocated from Chicago to Lanford. At the end of season 4 they move back to Chicago.
  - Jerry Bowman (Danton Stone) – Kathy's laid-back husband who loves the small-town atmosphere of Lanford, having moved there from Chicago to take a managers job at Wellman Plastics.
  - Kathy Bowman (Meagen Fay) – Roseanne's wealthy and tense neighbor who hates Lanford and its blue-collar atmosphere. Has an acrimonious relationship with Roseanne.
  - Todd Bowman (Troy Davidson, Adam Hendershott ) – Kathy and Jerry's son; friend of D.J.
- The Tilden family move into the Bowmans' old house in season 5.
  - Ty Tilden (Wings Hauser) – A neighbor of Roseanne's, who moved into Kathy's old house. He is a kind, laid-back, struggling single father of two daughters and owns a Winnebago.
  - Charlotte Tilden (Mara Hobel) – Ty Tilden's older daughter who acts responsibly, filling in the mother role for her sister Molly. Because of this, she finds that she has more in common with Roseanne than with Darlene or Molly.
  - Molly Tilden (Danielle Harris) – Ty Tilden's promiscuous daughter, who flirted with Darlene's boyfriend David and took Darlene to a rock concert then abandoned her to smoke weed with some guys in a van. She dies from brain cancer in season 3 episode 16 of The Conners, shortly after reconnecting with Darlene.
- In the season-10 revival, a Yemeni Muslim family lives next door to the Conners, rousing Roseanne's suspicions that the family might be terrorists. They are introduced in episode 7, "Go Cubs". They also appeared in The Conners.
  - Samir al-Harazi (Alain Washnevsky) – A Yemeni man who is very aware of Roseanne's suspicions and protective of his family. He also has a very dry sense of humor, choosing to come to Roseanne's house in the middle of the night to repay money she loaned his wife, in retaliation for Roseanne asking to borrow his Wi-Fi password at 2AM.
  - Fatima al-Harazi (Anne Bedian) – Samir's wife, she is soft-spoken and kind, but firm. She allows Roseanne's granddaughter to use their Wi-Fi password to FaceTime her mother in Afghanistan, believing that children should not be punished for adults' prejudices. In return, Roseanne defends her from a racist cashier and loans her money for groceries.
  - Kas'im al-Harazi (Callan Farris) – Samir and Fatima's young son, who has been a victim of racism and bullying since his family's move to Lanford and is now so terrified that he sleeps in a bulletproof vest.

=== Other characters ===
- Lonnie Anderson (Josh C. Williams, Luke Edwards, Kristopher Kent Hill) – Crystal's eldest child, born to her deceased husband, Sonny.
- Art (Dan Butler) – A divorced accountant to whom Roseanne and Jackie sell a motorcycle, and who provides tax services to Lanford Custom Cycle.
- Bob (John McConnell) – A close friend of Dan's.
- Dwight (William Sadler) – A buddy of Dan's who appears in the early seasons of Roseanne, who had a crush on Jackie. In The Conners, there is another character named Dwight who Dan appears to be friends with, but the character is not portrayed by William Sadler and might be a different character altogether.
- Fisher (Matt Roth) – Jackie's former long-time boyfriend, whom Dan ultimately went to jail for assaulting after learning he abused Jackie.
- Stacey Flagler (Traci Lords) – A waitress at the Lunchbox.
- George (Joseph Gordon-Levitt) – D.J.'s classmate.
- Gary Hall (Brian Kerwin) – Jackie's former fiancé.
- Heather (Heather Matarazzo) – D.J.'s girlfriend.
- Jimmy Meltrigger (Stephen Dorff) – Becky's former boyfriend from high school.
- Chip Lang (Jared Rushton) – Becky's former boyfriend from high school.
- Marla (Morgan Fairchild) – Nancy's girlfriend.
- Anne-Marie Mitchell (Adilah Barnes) – Roseanne's childhood friend, who is married to one of Dan's poker buddies, Chuckie. She and Chuck have a son, Chuck Jr., who is the same age as Lonnie and Darlene.
- Chuckie Mitchell (James Pickens Jr.) – Anne-Marie's husband, who occasionally worked with Dan. Pickens reprised the role in two episodes of the 10th season revival and currently (2019) appears on a recurring basis on The Conners.
- Mr. Parkin (Stan Freberg) – A highly qualified man who is frequently unemployed due to various incidents with the Conners.
- Scott (Fred Willard) – A probate attorney who marries Leon.
- Stinky (Matthew Fishman) – Roseanne's youngest child in an alternate reality, in the place of Jerry.
- Ziggy (Jay O. Sanders) – An old friend of the Conners. Roseanne reveals that his real name is Norbert, then asks, "does your mom still call you Norbie?" Ziggy helps Dan open Lanford Custom Cycle, then disappears.
- Jimmy Gartner (Danny Masterson) – Darlene's boyfriend, for whom she breaks up with David. In the 16th episode of season 7, Darlene confesses to Jackie that he broke up with her because he could not get close to her.
- Ronnie (Joan Collins) – Roseanne's rich cousin who persuades Darlene to get her GED and apply to art school.
