= Lecy Goranson =

American actress

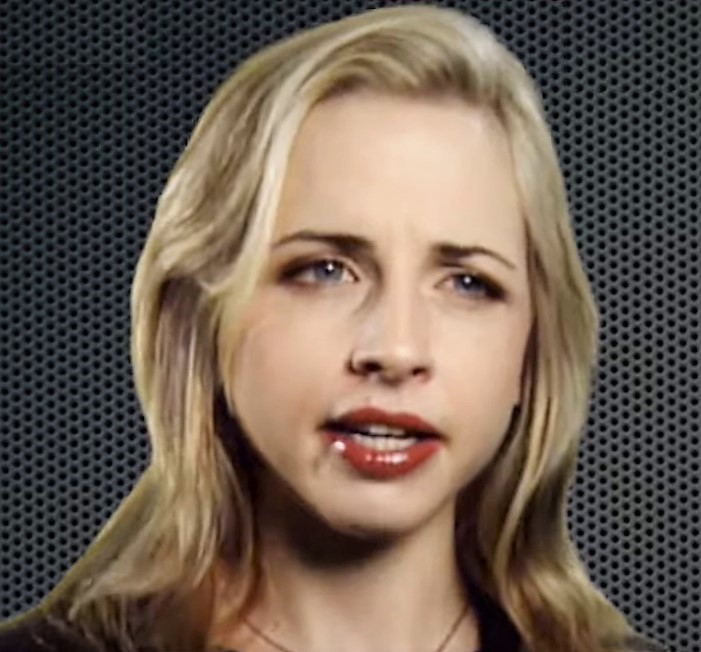
- Goranson in 2019
- Born: Evanston, Illinois, U.S.
- Education: Vassar College
- Occupation: Actress
- Years active: 1988–present

Goranson discussing Roseanne and going to college after being a child TV star

Lecy Goranson (/ˈliːsi/) is an American actress. She played Becky Conner in the television sitcoms Roseanne (1988–1997; 2018) and The Conners (2018–2025). She has also had supporting roles in the films How to Make an American Quilt (1995), Boys Don't Cry (1999), and The Extra Man (2010).

== Career ==
=== Roseanne ===
Goranson studied acting in Chicago and subsequently landed the role of Becky Conner. It was only the second time she had ever auditioned for any part. She played the character for five seasons, exiting the series in 1992, several episodes into the fifth season, to attend Vassar College. Her academic schedule allowed her to continue appearing part-time as Becky. Under her new arrangement, the show's producers and writers wrote scenes for Becky sparingly. Goranson's exit resulted in Becky's eloping with her boyfriend Mark.

During the following season, the producers wanted to bring back the character. Goranson was still unavailable, so Sarah Chalke auditioned and won the role.

Chalke played Becky for the remainder of the sixth season and all of the seventh season. When the show reached its eighth season, Goranson was able to play Becky again while still attending college, replacing Chalke. Goranson appeared in the show's eighth season, but by mid-season she had scheduling conflicts with school again. On two occasions, Goranson had to pull out of episodes in which the Becky character was necessary: Darlene's wedding and a family trip to Walt Disney World. Chalke played Becky for these episodes. Toward the season's end, Goranson returned to play Becky. When the series was renewed for a ninth season, Goranson, who was still in school, declined to continue in the role in order to not cause scheduling conflicts. Chalke returned for the ninth season, which was her last appearance in that role. Chalke appeared in season 10 as the new character Andrea who attempts to enlist Becky as a surrogate mother.

The appearances by Goranson vs. Chalke became a running gag. Goranson's first re-appearance was marked with a, "Where the hell have you been?" comment from several cast members while in character. Similarly, Chalke's sporadic appearances during Season 8 would be played for humor with an, "Aren't you glad you're here this week?" remark from Roseanne. There was even a glimpse into the future where a grown-up and somewhat catatonic DJ, played by John Goodman instead of Michael Fishman, repeatedly uttered to a psychiatrist (referring to Becky), "They say she's the same, but she isn't the same". One episode ended with both Beckys performing a parody of the opening theme of The Patty Duke Show, with similar music and lyrics to the "identical cousins song", and an appearance by William Schallert, who played the father on that show.

=== Post-Roseanne ===
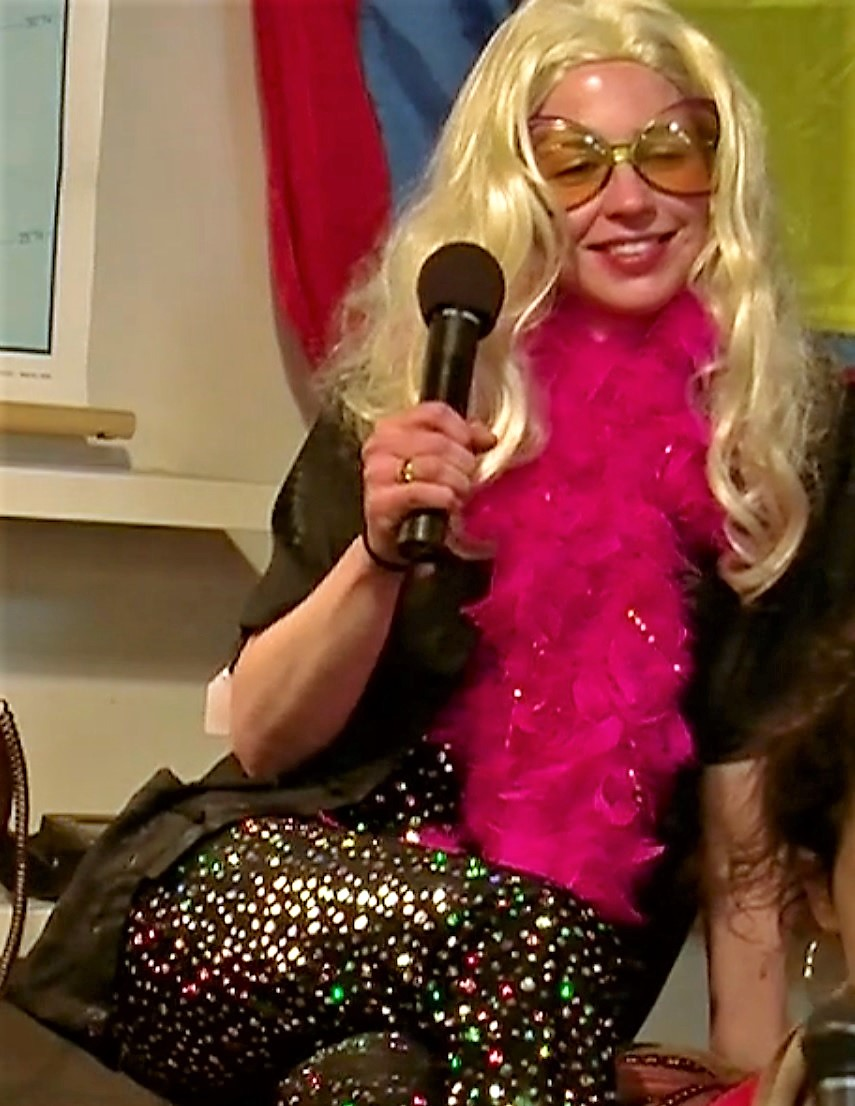
Goranson as Roz Chapman on Dale Radio in 2013

After the initial run of Roseanne, Goranson had supporting roles in the films How to Make an American Quilt (1995) and Boys Don't Cry (1999), and has guest starred in Law & Order: Special Victims Unit, Sex and the City, Damages and Fringe. In her post-Roseanne film roles, she is normally credited as Alicia rather than Lecy Goranson. She played the part of Sandra in The Extra Man which opened in limited release on July 30, 2010.

=== Roseanne revival and The Conners ===
On April 28, 2017, it was announced that a revival of Roseanne was in the works with most of the original cast and some of the original producers slated to return. In May 2017, it was confirmed that Goranson would be returning in the role of Becky. Chalke would also appear, playing a different role. The revival of Roseanne premiered on March 27, 2018, on ABC. On May 29, in the wake of controversial remarks made by Roseanne Barr on Twitter regarding Valerie Jarrett (an advisor of former president Barack Obama), ABC cancelled the revival after a single season.

On June 21, 2018, ABC announced a spin-off from Roseanne, entitled The Conners, with all the original cast of Roseanne to return, except for Barr herself. The new show premiered on October 16 and would air for seven seasons before concluding on April 23, 2025.

Goranson wrote season four's fourteenth episode, "Triggered", focusing on gun violence in the United States.

== Personal life ==
Goranson was born in Evanston, Illinois, to Stephen Goranson, who worked for the Environmental Protection Agency, and Linda Goranson, who taught English at Evanston Township High School. She has an older brother named Adam.

== Filmography ==
=== Film ===
Film work by Lecy Goranson
Year	Title	Role	Notes
1995	How to Make an American Quilt	Young Hy Dodd	
1999	Boys Don't Cry	Lisa "Candace" Lambert	
2004	Death 4 Told	Joyce	Segment: "The Psychic"
2005	Love, Ludlow	Myra	
2007	The Perfect Dress	Candace	Short film
2010	The Extra Man	Sandra	
2011	Monster Slayer	Sue	Short film
2013	The Wood House	Eleanore	Short film
2018	Hurricane Bianca 2: From Russia with Hate	Angela Jo	

=== Television ===
Television work by Lecy Goranson
Year	Title	Role	Notes
1988–1997, 2018	Roseanne	Becky Conner	120 episodes
2004	Sex and the City	Amber	Episode: "An American Girl in Paris, Part Deux"
2004	Law & Order: Special Victims Unit	Rosalin Silvo	Episode: "Poison"
2009	Fringe	Tattoo Girl	Episode: "Inner Child"
2011	Naked in a Fishbowl	Blossom Barney	Episode: "Blossom Barney Crystal Healer"
2012	Damages	Sally	Episode: "Something's Wrong With Me"
2015	Co-operation	Bonnie	2 episodes
2016	Inside Amy Schumer	Amy #3	Episode: "Psychopath Test"
2018–2025	The Conners	Becky Conner	112 episodes Nominated–Critics' Choice Television Award for Best Supporting Actress in a Comedy Series
