= Roseanne Conner =

Roseanne Harris Conner
- Roseanne character
- First appearance: "Life and Stuff" (1988)
- Last appearance: "Knee Deep" (2018)
- Created by: Roseanne Barr
- Portrayed by: Roseanne Barr

In-universe information
- Gender: Female
- Family: Al Harris (father; deceased); Beverly Harris (mother); Jackie Harris (sister)
- Spouse: Dan Conner
- Children: Rebecca "Becky" Conner-Healy; Darlene Conner-Healy; David Jacob "DJ" Conner; Jerry Garcia Conner
- Relatives: Mary (grandmother; deceased); Sonya (aunt); Shirley (aunt); Barbara (aunt); Harriet (aunt; deceased); Andy Harris (nephew); Harris Healy (granddaughter); Mark Healy II (grandson); Mary Conner (granddaughter); Beverly Conner (granddaughter)
- Home: Lanford, Illinois

Roseanne Harris Conner is the title character of the TV series Roseanne, created and portrayed by comedian and namesake Roseanne Barr. Roseanne is bossy, loud, caustic, overweight, and dominant. She constantly tries to control the lives of her sister, husband, children, co-workers, and friends. Despite her domineering nature, however, Roseanne is a loving wife and mother and loyal friend who works hard and makes as much time for her family as possible.

Roseanne Conner reappeared in the first season of the 2018 revived series, but was written out of the series after Barr was fired in 2018. In the spinoff series The Conners, the character is portrayed as having died of an opioid overdose.

== Creation and conception ==
In 1987, coming up with ideas for new shows, Marcy Carsey and Tom Werner of Carsey-Werner Productions decided to look into the concept of the working mother as a central voice. Up until that point, there had been shows with working mothers, but only as an adjunct to the father in the family. Werner had suggested that they take a chance on Barr whom they had seen on The Tonight Show. This was because he saw the unique "in your face" voice that they were looking for, and he contacted her agent and offered her the role. Barr's act at the time was the persona of the "domestic goddess", but as Carsey and Werner explains, she had the distinctive voice and attitude for the character and she was able to transform her into the working class heroine they envisioned. Barr immediately took the role. Barr has stated she had crafted the "fierce working-class domestic goddess" persona in the eight years preceding the sitcom and wanted to do a realistic show about a strong mother who was not a victim of patriarchal consumerism.

Barr, who was born into a working-class Jewish family in Salt Lake City, played a "nominally half-Jewish, working-class wife and mother" in the series. Although some commentators have mistakenly claimed that Jewishness was not mentioned on the show, Roseanne Conner was depicted as having a Jewish father. The Jewishness of Barr and her character on the show has often been overlooked, a fact that some commentators have claimed is because of public perceptions that Jewishness is at odds with being part of the white working class, and in part because of antisemitic stereotypes that depict Jews as wealthy, along with Jewish self-representations of Jews as being middle class. Barr has referred to Roseanne Conner as a "Jewish mother".

Barr became outraged when she watched the first episode of Roseanne and noticed that Matt Williams was listed as the creator in the credits. The series had originally been called Life & Stuff. She told Tanner Stransky of Entertainment Weekly, "We built the show around my actual life and my kids. The 'domestic goddess', the whole thing". In the same interview, Werner said, "I don't think Roseanne, to this day, understands that this is something legislated by the Writers Guild, and it's part of what every show has to deal with. They're the final arbiters." During the first season, Barr sought more creative control over her character, opposing Williams' authority. Barr refused to say certain lines and eventually walked off set. She threatened to quit the show if Williams did not leave. ABC let Williams go after the thirteenth episode.

== Biography ==
Roseanne Harris Conner is a lifelong resident of Lanford, a fictional mid-sized city in Illinois, stated to be about two hours from Chicago. She and her younger sister, Jackie Harris (Laurie Metcalf), are the daughters of Beverly (Estelle Parsons) and Al Harris (John Randolph). Roseanne married her high-school sweetheart Dan Conner (John Goodman), who works as an independent drywall contractor. When the series begins, they have been married for fifteen years and have three children: adolescent Becky (Alicia Goranson), pre-teen Darlene (Sara Gilbert), and young D.J. (Michael Fishman); a fourth child, Jerry Garcia, is born late in the series. Roseanne and her family deal with the many hardships of poverty, obesity, and domestic troubles with love and humor.

=== Season 1 ===
Roseanne is a line worker at Wellman Plastics, along with Jackie and their friend Crystal (Natalie West). Roseanne's parents, Bev and Al, arrive for an unannounced visit, sending the family into an uproar when they announce they may move to Lanford. Much to Roseanne and Jackie's relief, their parents say they are actually not moving. Roseanne also deals with tomboy Darlene's burgeoning puberty amid her daughter's own ideas of femininity. She also copes with boy-crazy Becky's dating issues, including first boyfriend, Chip (Jared Rushton). Roseanne is close to her youngest child, son, D.J., while Dan constantly frets if he expresses interest in anything other than masculine activities. Season one also finds the Conners experiencing, and surviving, a tornado. In the episode "Death and Stuff", a door-to-door salesman dies in the Conners' kitchen, and in the season finale, Roseanne stands up to the new overbearing foreman, then leads Jackie, Crystal, and other coworkers to quit Wellman Plastics.

=== Season 2 ===
Now that they have quit Wellman Plastics, Roseanne and Jackie look for new jobs. Jackie joins the Lanford Police Department, though Roseanne thinks it too dangerous. Roseanne cycles through a variety of menial jobs including telemarketer, secretary for Dan's boss, bartender, cashier at a fast-food restaurant, and, finally, sweeping floors at a beauty parlor. At home, Dan's poker buddy Arnie Thomas (Tom Arnold) shocks Roseanne when he plants a kiss on her, though it is only meant platonically. The Conners celebrate an outrageous Halloween that becomes an annual feature of the series. Roseanne wants ten minutes to herself to soak in the bathtub; this turns into a bizarre dream sequence in which the entire cast sings parodies of songs from musical comedies. Later, Becky increasingly rebels against Roseanne and Dan's parental authority as she becomes attracted to edgier guys. When old biker buddy Ziggy (Jay O. Sanders) appears in town, it reminds Roseanne and Dan of their own anti-establishment past. Darlene shows a talent for writing after winning recognition at school for her poem. Roseanne's own writing talents receive a boost when the family creates a basement writer's den for her birthday. This is the first season where the audience hears Roseanne thinking aloud.

=== Season 3 ===
The season opens with Roseanne confronting a possible unplanned pregnancy, though the test turns out negative. Roseanne lands a waitress job at the Rodbell's department store luncheonette. She likes her job and co-worker, Bonnie, but despises her strict boss Leon Carp (Martin Mull). Later, she locks horns with snooty new neighbor, Kathy Bowman. In the season finale, Ziggy reappears, proposing to open a motorcycle repair shop with Dan and Roseanne. While in the process of getting the business off the ground, Ziggy backs out, not wanting to feel responsible if the business fails and Dan and Roseanne lose their house. However, he leaves his share of the money for Dan to open it by himself. Dan, semi-estranged from his father, Ed, is dismayed that Crystal is marrying him and is pregnant. Becky defies her parents by dating Mark Healy, a punkish rebel teen they forbid her from seeing. Jackie breaks up with her boyfriend Gary who wants her to quit the police force after she is injured on duty. Jackie quits anyway because she would be confined to a desk job. Crystal gives birth to Dan's half-brother, Ed, Jr.

=== Season 4 ===
Roseanne and Dan open their new motorcycle repair shop business, Lanford Custom Cycle, while Roseanne continues working at Rodbell's luncheonette. Becky is still dating Mark, who now works for Dan at the bike shop. Becky shocks Roseanne by asking for birth control. Roseanne and Dan deal with Darlene's personality shifting into a withdrawn, sullen goth teen. Later Roseanne gets breast reduction surgery due to chronic back problems. After a drunken one-night stand with Arnie she is unable to remember, Jackie reevaluates her life and signs up for truck driving school. Dan and Roseanne accompany Arnie and Nancy when they elope to Las Vegas. Jackie and Roseanne's mother, Bev, tells them that their father has been having a 20-year affair with a woman named Joan. At the end of the season, the Conners face severe economic problems as Lanford Custom Cycle fails and Rodbell's Luncheonette closes.

=== Season 5 ===
After closing the bike shop, Dan returns to drywalling. Roseanne and Jackie each receive $10,000 from their mother, Bev who divorced her husband, Al. The sisters, along with friend Nancy (Sandra Bernhard), decide to open a diner. Bev becomes a fourth partner to provide the additional money they need. Seventeen-year-old Becky elopes with unemployed boyfriend Mark (Glenn Quinn), who gets a new job in Minneapolis. Jackie moves in with boyfriend Fischer, who later physically abuses her; Roseanne and Dan help Jackie leave him, though Dan is briefly jailed for assault. Jackie and Roseanne's father dies, and Roseanne confronts Joan, his longtime mistress, as well as the abuse she and Jackie suffered as children. Roseanne's rich cousin Ronnie (Joan Collins) visits and encourages Darlene to apply to an arts college. Darlene, now dating Mark's younger brother, David (Johnny Galecki), wants him to move into their house when his mother is about to move to a new town. Roseanne and Dan initially refuse, but Roseanne relents after witnessing Mrs. Healy's abusive behavior. Darlene is accepted to a Chicago arts college but decides to decline after David is rejected for the same school. Roseanne wants Darlene to wait a year, then reconsiders after learning David threatened to break up if she goes. When Darlene admits she fears failing, Roseanne convinces her to go. Dan enters a new business venture of flipping houses for profit, but nearly goes under after new partner Roger (Tim Curry), skips town as the first mortgage payment is coming due. Jackie saves Dan from financial ruin by buying the house.

=== Season 6 ===
When Roseanne and Jackie insist their troublesome mother stay away from the Lunch Box, Bev retaliates by selling her share to Roseanne's odious former boss, Leon Carp (Martin Mull). Roseanne discovers marijuana hidden in her basement and accuses David until Dan says it is her old stash. They, along with Jackie, smoke it. Roseanne's past as an abuse victim arises when she reacts violently to D.J. after he joyrides in her car and wrecks it. Becky and Mark return to Lanford and move into the Conners' house. Roseanne discovers David has been living with Darlene in Chicago. She forces David to return to Lanford, keeping the truth from Dan, who later finds out and briefly evicts him. Roseanne and Dan struggle to have another baby but Jackie becomes pregnant after a one-night stand with Fred (Michael O'Keefe), Dan's co-worker at the city garage where he now works. Jackie gives birth to a son. At the end of the season, Roseanne coordinates Jackie and Fred's wedding.

=== Season 7 ===
Roseanne gives Mark and Becky until May to move out, then tells Dan she is pregnant. Both harbor doubts about having a baby at their age, and there is an initial medical scare, but the pregnancy progresses normally. Darlene wants an open relationship with David while also seeing Jimmy. When David gives Darlene an ultimatum, she chooses Jimmy and they break up. Dan and Roseanne, Jackie and Fred, and Becky and Mark, all experience marital problems. D.J. has difficulties at school, including being bullied, having erections in class, and dealing with prejudice when he refuses to kiss a black girl in a school play. When Bev is arrested for drunk driving, she realizes she is an alcoholic and begins attending AA meetings. Becky and Mark move into a trashy trailer park. David has difficulty moving on from Darlene, but begins dating other girls. Roseanne wants David and Darlene to get back together. Dan and Roseanne worry about the way D.J.'s girlfriend bosses him around. After Jimmy breaks up with Darlene, she and David get back together.

=== Season 8 ===
Season eight addresses the arrival of Roseanne and Dan's son, Jerry Garcia Conner, who is born on Halloween night. (In a continuity error, the baby had been revealed to be a girl in Season 7. Barr explained: although originally the baby was going to be a girl, she subsequently got pregnant in real life and, when they discovered it was going to be a boy, they changed the show baby to a boy.) Dan decides to quit his secure city job to work with Chuck and Bob to help build the new prison being constructed outside of Lanford. With the pension, final check, and retirement money he receives for leaving his job, Dan gives his family the vacation to Walt Disney World. Beverly comes out as a lesbian. The season climaxes with a rushed wedding for David and Darlene, who is pregnant. Immediately after the ceremony, Dan suffers a heart attack. The season concludes with Dan and Roseanne having a bitter fight after Dan refuses to stick to his new diet and exercise plan. They end up wrecking their living room in the process. The credits fade as Roseanne walks out on Dan.

=== Season 9 ===
Roseanne and Jackie win the state lottery jackpot of $108 million; This allows Roseanne and her family to live an extravagant lifestyle, traveling to an expensive spa, visiting wealthy people in the Hamptons, and refurbishing the family home. Roseanne and Jackie use their wealth to help others. They turn over their ownership in The Lunchbox to Nancy and Leon, and help save Wellman Plastics in an employee buyout. Dan is absent for much of the season, taking his mother to a medical clinic in California to treat her mental illness. While there, he has a brief, non-sexual relationship with another woman. He and Roseanne separate but later reconcile. In the season's final episode, Roseanne reveals that season nine is actually a fictional story that she wrote about her life. To cope, Roseanne twisted major elements of her life for the story, which the audience does not discover until the final moments of the series. In reality, Dan's heart attack near the end of Season 8 was fatal and the Conner family did not win the lottery. Also, Jackie is now a lesbian and Beverly is straight. Darlene is now with Mark, and Becky and David are a couple. The series' original run ends with Roseanne writing her life story.

=== Season 10 ===
The television program was revived in 2018 on ABC, where it had originally aired, with all main cast including Roseanne Barr returning.

The events that Roseanne claimed were true in the final episode of Season 9 were retconned as being fictional elements of Roseanne's book: in the revival, Dan is still alive, the girls did not end up with the opposite romantic partners, the family did not win the lottery and neither Jackie nor Bev is a lesbian.

Roseanne and Dan have lost weight and Roseanne suffers from chronic knee pain. Roseanne and Jackie's diner "The Lunch Box" has since gone out of business; it is later revealed on an episode of The Conners it became an Asian restaurant sometime after 1996. Dan is still a contractor while Roseanne is retired from any salaried job. Despite her chronic pain, she sometimes works as an Uber driver.

Roseanne's knee is such a focal point this season that there are entire episodes devoted to it: "Roseanne Gets the Chair", "Netflix & Pill", and "Knee Deep". There is also a storyline involving Roseanne taking opiate medication for the pain, much of which she receives from friends, and becoming addicted to the drug.

Roseanne has three grandchildren; Darlene's children with David, daughter Harris and son Mark and D.J.'s daughter, Mary. D.J. is married to Geena, an active-duty military operative still serving overseas; D.J. also served in the military but was honorably discharged. Becky has no children and her husband, Mark, died about ten years earlier. Roseanne's younger son Jerry is explained away as working on a fishing boat in Alaska.

Amid other important plot points, near the end of the season, Roseanne's knee degenerates further, requiring surgery. She and Dan are unable to afford this but after some fortunate circumstances she will be able to have the surgery.

The program was initially renewed for an 11th season but was rapidly cancelled on May 29, 2018, when Barr was fired from the show after she wrote a racist tweet describing Valerie Jarrett, a black woman and one of President Barack Obama's senior advisers, as the offspring of the "Muslim Brotherhood & Planet of the Apes."

=== The Conners ===
One month after Barr was fired, the other cast members and ABC agreed to create an entirely new program entitled The Conners. In the series premiere in October 2018, it was revealed Roseanne Conner died from an opioid overdose. The Conners, which ran for seven seasons, concluded with Dan suing the company which prescribed the opioids.

== Reception ==
Critical reception of the character has been positive. In 2009, she was listed in the Top 5 Classic TV Moms by Film.com. In June 2010, Entertainment Weekly named Roseanne one of the 100 Greatest Characters of the Last 20 Years. In May 2012, she was one of the 12 moms chosen by users of iVillage on their list of "Mommy Dearest: The TV Moms You Love". AOL named her the 11th Most Memorable Female TV Character. In May 2015, BuzzFeed posted the article 26 Times Roseanne Was The Funniest TV Mom. The relationship between Roseanne and Dan Conner has received praise. An article in the Sarasota Herald-Tribune called their relationship realistic, commenting that while they mock each other, viewers can feel their love while they deal with the kinds of problems real families face. For her role as Roseanne, Barr won an Emmy, a Golden Globe, a Kids Choice Award, and three American Comedy Awards.
