= Michael Fishman =

American actor, writer and producer

- Born: Michael Aaron Fishman; October 22, 1981 (age 45); Los Angeles County, California, U.S.
- Occupations: Actor, Writer, Producer, Director
- Years active: 1988–present
- Spouse: Jennifer Briner Fishman (m. 1999; div. 2019)
- Children: 2

Michael Aaron Fishman (born October 22, 1981) is an American actor, writer, and producer known for playing D.J. Conner on the long-running series Roseanne and its spin-off show The Conners.

== Early life ==
Fishman was born in Los Angeles County, California, to a family of Jewish descent.

He grew up in Cypress, California, and attended Arnold Elementary School.

== Career ==
=== Roseanne: 1988–1997, 2018 ===
Fishman's acting career began after he met Roseanne Barr during an early audition. She asked him to tell her a joke. He said, "Why did the turtle cross the road? It was the chicken's day off." She was impressed, and although he had no experience, Barr fought for Fishman to play D.J. Conner. He worked on Roseanne from age six to fifteen.

On April 28, 2017, it was announced that an eight-episode revival of Roseanne was in the works and being shopped around to various networks and that it would feature most of the original main cast. However, at the time, it was unknown if Fishman would reprise his role as D.J. Conner. On May 16, 2017, it was confirmed that Fishman had signed on to appear in the revival, to air mid-season in 2018 on ABC.

=== 1997–2017 ===
Fishman continued to act while attending the Orange County High School of the Arts at Los Alamitos High School in the Musical Theater and Technical Theater departments.

He appeared in guest roles on Walker, Texas Ranger and Seinfeld, and earned a recurring role alongside Andrew Dice Clay on Hitz just before it was canceled. Fishman also appeared in films, including Steven Spielberg's A.I. Artificial Intelligence. He then reconnected with Barr as a co-host of The Roseanne Show, which ran for two years before it was canceled in 2000.

Fishman has also worked on many television shows and films in other roles aside from acting, including executive producing, writing, directing, set building, production staff and camera operating. Some of his credits include Great Job, Thanks!, The Real Roseanne Show, and Sport Science.

In 2013, he was cast in Joseph Mazzello's directorial debut sports comedy-drama film Undrafted as Antonelli. The film was released on July 15, 2016.

=== The Conners: 2018–2022 ===
On June 21, 2018, ABC announced a spin-off from Roseanne, titled The Conners, with all the original cast (excluding Barr) to return; the show premiered on October 16, 2018. On March 22, 2019, ABC announced that the show had been renewed for a second season. Fishman was not listed as part of the returning main cast, but the network press release said that additional cast would be announced at a later date.

On October 5, 2020, Fishman announced he would be directing the seventh episode of the show's third season. Although it was the seventh episode to be filmed, it aired in the second week of the show, as the Halloween special.

Fishman was told he would not return for season 5 of The Conners.

=== 2023 ===
In 2023, Fishman starred in Abducted By My Teacher: The Elizabeth Thomas Story as part of Lifetime's "Ripped From the Headlines" feature films where he portrayed Tad Cummins, who was responsible for the kidnapping of Elizabeth Thomas.

== Personal life ==
Fishman and Jennifer Briner married on October 22, 1999. They were separated as of June 16, 2017, according to a formal application for legal separation Briner filed on December 27, 2018. On April 22, 2019, Briner officially filed for divorce. The couple have two children.

== Filmography ==
=== Film ===
Year	Title	Role	Notes
1997	Little Bigfoot 2: The Journey Home	Mike Holliday	
2001	A.I. Artificial Intelligence	Teen in Van	
2016	Undrafted	Antonelli	

=== Television ===
Year	Title	Role	Notes
1988–1997, 2018	Roseanne	D.J. Conner	220 episodes
1991	Little Rosey	Little D.J. (voice)	Episode: "Roseanne, Not Rosey"
1992	The Jackie Thomas Show	D.J. Conner	Episode: "The Joke"
1993	The Jackie Thomas Show	Jake	Episode: "One Flu Over the Cuckoo’s Nest"
1996	Hey Arnold!	Joey (voice)	Episode: "Spelling Bee"
1997	Seinfeld	Gregg	Episode: "The Apology"
1997	Hitz	Jimmy	2 episodes
1999	Walker, Texas Ranger	Snake	Episode: "Lost Boys"
1999	The Roseanne Show	Himself	38 episodes
2011	Roseanne's Nuts	Himself	Episode: "Passover"
2018–2022	The Conners	D.J. Conner	36 episodes
2023	Abducted By My Teacher: The Elizabeth Thomas Story	Tad Cummins	Television film

== Awards and nominations ==
Emmy Award

- 2007: Nominated, "Outstanding Production Design / Art Direction" – Sports Science

TV Land Award

- 2008: Won, "Innovator Award" – Roseanne

Young Artist Award

- 1989: Nominated, "Best Young Actor Under Nine Years of Age" – Roseanne
- 1991: Nominated, "Best Young Actor Under Nine Years of Age" – Roseanne
- 1995: Won, "Best Performance: Young Actor in a TV Comedy Series" – Roseanne

YoungStar Awards

- 1997: Nominated, "Best Performance by a Young Actor in a Comedy TV Series" – Roseanne
