= List of The Conners episodes =

The Conners is an American sitcom television series created by Matt Williams for ABC as a spin-off continuation of the series Roseanne. It stars John Goodman, Laurie Metcalf, Sara Gilbert, Lecy Goranson, Michael Fishman, Emma Kenney, Ames McNamara, Jayden Rey, Maya Lynne Robinson, and Jay R. Ferguson. The series premiered on October 16, 2018. On May 10, 2024, The Conners was renewed for a seventh and final season, which premiered on March 26, 2025.

During the course of the series, 112 episodes of The Conners aired, concluding on April 23, 2025.

== Series overview ==
Season	Episodes	Originally released		Rank	Avg. viewers (millions)
Season	Episodes	First released	Last released	Rank	Avg. viewers (millions)
1	11	October 16, 2018	January 22, 2019	31	9.53
2	20	September 24, 2019	May 5, 2020	37	7.73
3	20	October 21, 2020	May 19, 2021	48	5.64
4	20	September 22, 2021	May 18, 2022	51	4.76
5	22	September 21, 2022	May 3, 2023	46	4.96
6	13	February 7, 2024	May 22, 2024	52	4.11
7	6	March 26, 2025	April 23, 2025	TBA	TBA

== Episodes ==
=== Season 1 (2018–19) ===
No. overall	No. in season	Title	Directed by	Written by	Original release date	Prod. code	U.S. viewers (millions)
1	1	"Keep On Truckin'"	Andy Ackerman	Bruce Helford, Bruce Rasmussen & Dave Caplan	October 16, 2018	101	10.56
In a tragic turn of events, Roseanne has suddenly died following knee surgery. Three weeks later, the family learns her death was due to an opioid overdose, leading them to uncover her hidden drug dependency due to chronic pain. Dan blames neighbor Marcy (Mary Steenburgen) for Roseanne's death by giving her prescription pain pills. Marcy says she, Roseanne, and other friends often exchanged medications to help each other out due to prohibitive drug costs. The family learns later that Roseanne obtained pills from multiple sources. Also, DJ's military wife, Geena, is on leave from Afghanistan. Darlene's adolescent son, Mark, tells Dan he has a crush on a boy at school.
2	2	"Tangled Up in Blue"	Bob Koherr	Darlene Hunt	October 23, 2018	103	8.00
Darlene is annoyed by unexpectedly meeting David's free-spirited girlfriend, Blue (Juliette Lewis), at Mark's parent-teacher conference. During a weekend visit with David and Blue, Harris loses her virginity. An angry and upset Darlene demands that David be more attentive with the children and that Blue be uninvolved in parenting issues; Dan offers Becky a part-time job with his construction company. He discovers her drinking problem and insists she get help. Darlene begins dating again and tells David it is time they divorced.
3	3	"There Won't Be Blood"	Bob Koherr	Jana & Mitch Hunter	October 30, 2018	104	7.83
After Mark's school bans his Frida Kahlo Halloween costume for culture appropriation, Darlene clashes with administrators, believing the policy is too politically correct. Harris passes her driving test and pressures Dan to let her use Roseanne's old car. Darlene interviews for a waitress job at an insult restaurant, then offends her potential boss with overly-insulting comments. Jackie introduces the family to new boyfriend, Peter (Matthew Broderick), an unemployed academic.
4	4	"The Separation of Church and Dan"	Andy Ackerman	Sid Youngers	November 13, 2018	102	6.94
Jackie and Darlene discuss how to celebrate the upcoming holidays, the first without Roseanne. At his family's urging, Dan reluctantly attends a grief support group. Geena, home on leave, insists Mary attend church after learning DJ has not taken her in two years. Jackie helps Mark poll mall patrons about the upcoming elections for a school project.
5	5	"Miracles"	Bob Koherr	Liz Astrof	November 20, 2018	105	6.86
Becky announces she is pregnant. To Dan's dismay, she intends to raise the baby without the father, Emilio, her co-worker at La Casita Bonita restaurant. She tells Jackie that Emilio may be unable to financially support their child. Darlene lands a job with a local crime magazine called, "Lock 'Em Up", but new boss, Ben, resists her creative ideas.
6	6	"One Flew Over the Conners' Nest"	Fred Savage	Ali Liebegott	November 27, 2018	106	7.32
Bridget and Maria, a lesbian couple Becky went to high school with, want to adopt Becky's baby; Jackie obtains a city permit to build a chicken coop in Dan's backyard, using it as an excuse to spend more time with the family. Dan assures her she is always welcome at the Conner house. Darlene, working as a server at the casino, copes with a frequent patron who continually harasses her.
7	7	"Hold the Salt"	Kimberly McCullough	Dave Caplan	December 4, 2018	107	6.63
Darlene begins a romantic relationship with new boss, Ben, but their similarly controlling personalities soon clash. Peter asks Dan to restore his Vespa motor bike, but Dan is reluctant after learning Jackie is paying for everything; Dan tells Jackie that Peter is using her in the relationship.
8	8	"O Sister, Where Art Thou?"	Rebecca Asher	Sid Youngers	December 11, 2018	108	6.68
A cop brings Harris home after catching her drinking underage. Becky warns her to stop but agrees not to tell Darlene. Darlene finds out anyway and is angry at Becky, unleashing Becky's pent-up resentment over her sister's absence when her husband, Mark, died. Dan's old high school friend, Louise, is romantically interested in him, though he is still grieving Roseanne. Jackie participates in Peter's educational project simulating Norwegian medieval life.
9	9	"Rage Against the Machine"	Fred Savage	Jana & Mitch Hunter	January 8, 2019	111	6.85
Dan substitutes for DJ when he is out sick for his vending-machine service job. When an improperly secured machine falls on Dan, injuring him, Darlene hires an attorney to sue the company for medical damages. Becky's boss warns her about flirting with the customers on the job.
10	10	"Don't Shoot the Piano Teacher"	Kimberly McCullough	Kimberly Altamirano & Simone Finch	January 15, 2019	109	6.65
Darlene asks Ben to give Mark piano lessons then objects to his strict teaching style. Mark finds it challenging and says that Darlene's constantly praising him is ineffective. Dan and Jackie try to convince Becky that Emilio would be a good father to their baby. Ben wants Darlene to move to Chicago and live with him after receiving an offer to relocate the magazine there.
11	11	"We Continue to Truck"	Bob Koherr	Bruce Helford	January 22, 2019	110	7.74
Jackie discovers Peter is cheating on her and throws him out. Without Roseanne to help her navigate the aftermath, she drunkenly invades the old "Lunch Box" restaurant. David breaks up with Blue because she wants children and he does not. Darlene reconsiders moving to Chicago with Ben. After an ICE raid on a number of local restaurants, Emilio is arrested and deported to Mexico.

=== Season 2 (2019–20) ===
No. overall	No. in season	Title	Directed by	Written by	Original release date	Prod. code	U.S. viewers (millions)
12	1	"Preemies, Weed and Infidelity"	Gail Mancuso	Bruce Helford & Bruce Rasmussen & Dave Caplan	September 24, 2019	201	5.77
Becky goes into premature labor during Dan's poker game and is rushed to the hospital. Darlene confides to Jackie that she has rekindled her relationship with David while still dating Ben and is uncertain how to proceed. Harris has been baking and selling marijuana-laced cookies, resulting in Darlene grounding her. Becky delivers a baby girl that she names Beverly Rose, honoring her grandmother and deceased mother.
13	2	"A Kiss Is Just a Kiss"	Gail Mancuso	Darlene Hunt	October 1, 2019	202	5.58
Darlene and David meet with the school principal after Mark and another boy are caught kissing, breaking the school's strict rules against PDA (Public Displays of Affection). Mark is disappointed when the other boy blames him and denies being gay. Becky struggles to produce enough breast milk and worries that her age and past drinking are against her being a good mother. Meanwhile, Darlene has a close call when Ben unexpectedly arrives at the house while David is upstairs in her bedroom after spending the night.
14	3	"The Preemie Monologues"	Gail Mancuso	Jana & Mitch Hunter	October 8, 2019	203	5.69
As the family take turns sitting with Beverly Rose in the neonatal ICU, Becky returns to work before she is physically able, stressed about earning enough money to support her child. Harris confronts Darlene about her seeing both David and Ben, and insists she choose one. Otherwise, she will tell her father the truth. Dan grows closer to his platonic friend, Louise, finally asking her out, his first date since Roseanne died. In the end-credits scene, the Conner family surprise Becky by renovating the basement into a comfortable living space for her and Beverly Rose.
15	4	"Lanford... Lanford"	Gail Mancuso	Bruce Helford & Bruce Rasmussen & Dave Caplan	October 15, 2019	204	5.50
Jackie helps Darlene realize her true feelings about David and Ben. David insists he and Darlene attend family therapy together. Darlene intends to use the session to end their relationship, but it is David who breaks-up with her, saying they have always been unequal partners. Darlene tells Ben about also seeing David, but he already knows and breaks-up with her, though she can keep her job. Dan worries about Becky's sobriety when she wants the bartender job after Louise's promotion to restaurant manager. Becky notes that despite Dan always having ample beer in the house, she has remained sober.
16	5	"Nightmare on Lunch Box Street"	Gail Mancuso	Debby Wolfe	October 29, 2019	205	6.03
When the old Lunch Box café space becomes vacant, Jackie wants to reopen it with Becky. They discover that Bev owns the property and has been collecting rent income for years, despite claiming poverty. Jackie and Becky confront Bev, who says Darlene has power of attorney over all her affairs. Jackie, angry, orders her mother to move out, forcing Bev to go to Dan's house. Meanwhile, Ben and Darlene's work relationship becomes strained. Mary feels like an outsider after a woman believes she is adopted.
17	6	"Tempest in a Stew Pot"	Fred Savage	Sid Youngers	November 12, 2019	206	5.48
Jackie and Becky present Darlene with their comprehensive Lunch Box business plan. Darlene considers the venture too risky and already has a potential new tenant. Jackie storms out and an angry Becky claims Darlene does not want her to succeed, then moves in with Jackie. Mark designs personalized turkey place settings for the family's upcoming Thanksgiving dinner. After Harris and her perpetually-stoned friend, Odessa, attempt to take Dan's motorcycle out for a ride, damaging it, Dan bans Odessa from the house. Harris ignores Darlene telling her she can no longer see Odessa.
18	7	"Slappy Holidays"	Gail Mancuso	Emily Wilson	November 19, 2019	207	5.68
Jackie and Becky, still angry at Darlene, agree to attend Thanksgiving dinner at the Conner house. Dan invites Louise and also allows Odessa to come, despite having banned her from the house. During the celebration, Jackie and Darlene feud over re-opening the Lunch Box, their respective family roles, and other long-buried resentments, resulting in Jackie angrily slapping Darlene. Harris, upset by the family turmoil, leaves to stay with Odessa, who is later discovered to have been living on her own for five years. Darlene allows Harris to stay overnight to cool off. Dan persuades Darlene to let Becky and Jackie reopen the restaurant. Becky moves back into the house.
19	8	"Lanford, Toilet of Sin"	Gail Mancuso	Bruce Helford	November 26, 2019	208	5.74
While breaking through drywall to install the new pizza oven, Dan discovers excessive non-toxic mold. Repairs will cost Jackie her remaining savings, so she decides against opening. After a newspaper article about her predicament, the community rallies to help and Jackie moves ahead with opening the café. Becky tries to get her old waitress job back, but the position has been filled. Undeterred, Becky persuades Louise to extend the bar's hours to 4 a.m., with herself working the late shift for tips, which is surprisingly successful. Ben drops off Darlene's work laptop, then stays to help Mark with a school project while Darlene employs desperate measures to see Harris, who is still at Odessa's. When Harris refuses to see her mother, Darlene is arrested for disturbing the peace. Ben bails Darlene out of jail.
20	9	"Smoking Penguins and Santa on Santa Action"	Jody Margolin Hahn	Kimberly Altamirano & Simone Finch	December 10, 2019	209	5.72
Everyone except Becky forgets Dan's birthday. Dan invites Louise to join the family's annual Santa photo (minus Harris). When Jackie insults Louise, believing she is trying to take Roseanne's place, Dan bans Jackie from the photo and restricts her to Christmas Eve at the house. Louise assures Jackie that she and Dan are only platonic friends. Meanwhile, in a cost-cutting move, Ben is fired as publisher of "Lock 'Em Up". Darlene is promoted at half Ben's salary then fired after demanding more money. As Ben and Darlene commiserate at a local bar, they renew their romance. The family apologizes for forgetting Dan's birthday and give him a special gift; Becky volunteers to remind everyone when it is Dan's birthday. In a post-episode scene, Jackie pastes the absent Harris' picture onto the family Santa photo and cuts off Louise's image before mailing it as a Christmas card.
21	10	"Throwing a Christian to a Bear"	Michael Arden	Teleplay by : Bruce Helford & Bruce Rasmussen & Dave Caplan; Story by : Lecy Goranson	January 21, 2020	211	5.40
The family gathers to watch the Bears-Packers football game. Becky brings her new boyfriend, Wyatt, a devout Christian and avid Green Bay Packers fan. Ben's depressed, defeatist attitude may derail his and Darlene's chance to obtain a start-up loan for a new mugshot-type magazine. Becky dumps Wyatt after he criticizes the Conner family for being overly-zealous sports fans and their unhealthy lifestyle. Ben thinks he lacks the energy and desire to build a new magazine and worries about the risk for Darlene and the kids. Darlene is willing to assume the risk and wants to head the magazine's operation. Dan comforts a despondent Becky, saying she will find the right man.
22	11	"Mud Turtles, a Good Steak and One Man in a Tub"	Gail Mancuso	Dave Caplan	January 28, 2020	210	5.31
Louise rescues Dan, who gets stuck in the bathtub. Becky suspects Dawn, the Lunch Box's new food vendor, is befriending Jackie to oversell them supplies. Harris lands a job at Price Warehouse that helps employees earn online college degrees; Darlene instead wants Harris to attend Central Illinois State College but the school's financial aid package is a twenty-year-loan, rather than grants or scholarships. Louise and her band are offered a three-to-six-month Midwest tour. Louise will decline it if Dan engages in a fully romantic relationship. Dan, still grieving, cannot commit, and Louise leaves. After reducing the food order, Jackie is surprised that Dawn still wants to be friends. Darlene tells Harris she supports her educational plan.
23	12	"Live from Lanford"	Jody Margolin Hahn	Bruce Helford & Bruce Rasmussen & Dave Caplan	February 11, 2020	218	6.21
Mark and Harris watch the 2020 New Hampshire Democratic primary on TV for Mark's school assignment, prompting other family members to express their political opinions and stress the importance of voting. Mark resents assumptions that he supports Pete Buttigieg because he is gay. The family throws Louise an impromptu going-away party, believing it will compel Dan to ask her to stay. Their plan backfires, forcing Dan to admit that he and Louise broke up. Dan consults a priest about his inability to move past Roseanne's death, then determines he will do so when ready. Mark expresses anger over Harris leaving home, leading her to take time to discuss his and Austin's renewed, though troubled, relationship. The episode was performed live for both East and West Coast airings and incorporated actual updates on the primary results.
24	13	"Brothers, Babies and Breakdowns"	Timothy Busfield	Debby Wolfe	February 18, 2020	212	5.51
On the eve of the Lunch Box reopening, Jackie recruits Dwight to replace her cook who injured his hand. After babysitting Beverly Rose, Ben wants a baby with Darlene, though she is reluctant. Dan reads in the obituary column that his estranged father, Ed, has died. He later receives a phone call from someone wanting a drywall estimate. The caller is Dan's half-brother, Ed Jr., who bitterly resents Dan for ignoring him and his sister while they were growing up and who claims Ed was always a good father. Jackie employs an unorthodox relaxation technique after Dwight suffers a panic attack on opening day. Dan and Ed Jr. reconcile after Dan proves that Ed, Sr. blocked his attempts to contact his siblings over the years. Darlene agrees to have a baby with Ben. As the Conner clan celebrates the Lunch Box's successful first day, Dan arrives with Ed Jr. to reunite him with the family.
25	14	"Bad Dads and Grads"	Jody Margolin Hahn	Sid Youngers	February 25, 2020	213	5.11
Dan and Ed Jr. bond as brothers, though Dan is dismayed that their father paid for Ed Jr.'s education. Harris and Mark disapprove of Darlene and Ben wanting a baby. Mark worries Darlene's age makes it too risky and suspects she is just trying to keep Ben. Jackie meets Ron and Janelle, a friendly, middle-aged married couple. They invite Jackie to be their relationship "partner", a situation Becky calls a "thrupple". Becky says it is unfair for Dan to blame his brother for Ed Sr. failing him as a father. She suggests he needs closure. Dan reconciles his conflicted feelings by blowing up Ed Sr.'s beloved old car that Ed Jr. gave him. The ending scene is from the series, "Roseanne", season 4, episode 13, "Bingo" and shows Dan babysitting infant Ed Jr.
26	15	"Beards, Thrupples and Robots"	Gail Mancuso	Bruce Helford & Bruce Rasmussen & Dave Caplan	March 17, 2020	214	6.49
Darlene and Ben need to raise money to launch their new magazine. Darlene is hired at Price Warehouse, creating tension with Harris, who becomes Darlene's boss. Ben shocks everyone by shaving his beard to look more professional to potential magazine advertisers. Harris fires Darlene after catching her working on the magazine during work hours. Jackie discovers Ron and Janelle are an angry, unhappy couple and ends their "thruple" arrangement before it starts. Ben lands a big advertising account for the magazine. Harris loses her job and college assistance replaced after being replaced by a robot. Ozzy and Sharon Osbourne make a cameo appearance as another couple interested in Jackie.
27	16	"Tats and Tias"	Don Scardino	Jana & Mitch Hunter	March 24, 2020	215	6.40
A jobless and dejected Harris moves back home. When Becky needs affordable childcare for Beverly Rose, Emilio recommends his two aunts. Darlene cheers up Harris by them making prank phone calls, including pranking Jackie. Emilio's aunts make insulting remarks about Becky and Jackie in Spanish, unaware Jackie speaks the language. Dan runs into old biker buddy, Lord Tony, at his newly-opened bike shop. When Tony mentions needing to hire more help, Dan recommends Harris. Darlene delays telling Harris about the job, claiming she is still too depressed to work but Dan accuses her of being an overly-protective mother. Becky confronts Emilio's aunts about their insulting remarks. They blame her for Emilio's deportation and want her to marry him so he can return to the US. Harris starts working at the bike shop and suggests the family get matching Conner tattoos. Humorous suggestions include: a sinking ship, a burning house, and an atomic mushroom cloud.
28	17	"The Icewoman Cometh"	Don Scardino	Amy Fox	April 7, 2020	216	6.18
When Bev offers to give Mark $5000 for tech camp, Darlene asks her to also pay for Harris' tattoo school tuition. Bev agrees, but will then not pay for Mark's camp. Dan's poker buddies encourage him to reconnect with Louise, who is still on tour. Bev tells Mark that Darlene wants the $5000 for Harris instead of him. Mark angrily confronts Darlene, complaining she always focuses on Harris' troubles while ignoring him. Dan, still grieving Roseanne's death, feels guilty having feelings for Louise. Darlene is angry when Bev reveals the $5000 was always intended for Mark; she only wanted to create turmoil to punish Darlene for giving Jackie the restaurant against her wishes. Darlene is tempted to withdraw an additional $5000 from Bev's bank account for Harris while she still has power of attorney, though Harris dissuades her from committing an illegal act. Dan goes to where Louise is performing to say he is ready to move on from Roseanne. He sees her kissing her bandmate, Zack, and leaves.
29	18	"Pilot Lights & Sister Fights"	Fred Savage	Daniel Talbott	April 14, 2020	217	5.94
Dan returns to the bar and tells Louise he wants a committed relationship. She says it is too late and she is with someone else now. Harris weighs in about Darlene and Ben starting a family together. Darlene thinks Becky and Ben are spending too much time together and wrongly thinks Becky is attempting to steal Ben. Darlene worries that if she is unable to conceive, Ben will leave her. Jackie consoles Dan and offers helpful advice about moving on from Roseanne's death. Louise returns and she and Dan reconcile. Becky and Darlene make-up.
30	19	"CPAPs, Hickeys and Biscuits"	Lynda Tarryk	Kimberly Altamirano	April 28, 2020	219	5.96
Dan's poker buddies chide him about his and Louise's upcoming first official date. When Darlene spends the night in jail after refusing to sign a traffic ticket, Ben stays over to watch the kids. Mark and his female classmate, Harper, are working late on their science project. Darlene is furious and blames Ben after discovering the two kids gave each other hickeys. Mark says he and Harper were only practicing hickeys before she tries it with her boyfriend. Dan sleeps over with Louise, but wakes up during the night needing his CPAP machine. He is embarrassed but Louise assures him it is a normal part of aging. Emilio's aunts pressure Becky to marry him so he can return to the US, but she resists a sham marriage. Ben and Darlene argue over their stalled relationship. The bank issues a house foreclosure notice after Dan falls $4000 behind on his mortgage.
31	20	"Bridge Over Troubled Conners"	Gail Mancuso	Emily Wilson	May 5, 2020	220	6.05
Ben and Darlene find a perfect apartment. When Darlene learns Dan is facing foreclosure, she wants to use their deposit money to bail him out and for her and Ben to live at the house. Ben says Dan will only fall behind again due to his advancing age and slowing business. He relents after Darlene becomes distraught over losing her childhood home. Dan then stubbornly refuses to allow them to take over the mortgage. Elsewhere, Becky and Jackie drive to the Mexican border so Emilio can meet Beverly Rose. Becky later stuns the family by announcing she married Emilio, although he must remain in Mexico for two years. Shortly after, Emilio illegally enters the country and shows up at the Conner house. Becky demands he return to Mexico before getting caught.

=== Season 3 (2020–21) ===
No. overall	No. in season	Title	Directed by	Written by	Original release date	Prod. code	U.S. viewers (millions)
32	1	"Keep On Truckin' Six Feet Apart"	Jody Margolin Hahn	Bruce Helford	October 21, 2020	301	4.90
Mark oversees home health protocols as the Conners cope with the COVID pandemic. Jackie keeps the Lunch Box afloat doing take-out orders but cannot afford Becky's salary. Emilio, hiding from ICE (and Dan), secretly works at the restaurant. A neighbor, who is a process server, serves Dan an eviction notice. Jackie discovers Dan laid off his crew and is doing drywall jobs by himself to make more money, risking his health. Darlene and Ben lose all advertising for their online crime magazine and, nearly broke, consider ending it. Louise convinces Dan to allow everyone living in the house to pay him rent so he can pay the mortgage. Darlene and Becky are hired at the newly reopened Wellman Plastics plant.
33	2	"Halloween and the Election vs. the Pandemic"	Michael Fishman	Bruce Helford	October 28, 2020	307	4.36
Mark and Mary are disappointed when all Lanford Halloween 'Trick or Treating' is canceled due to the pandemic. Mark clashes with classmates over social distancing. Mary is home alone all day while D.J. works long hours. Without consulting D.J., Becky and Darlene decide Mary should live with them during the week until D.J.'s work schedule stabilizes. Mark is suspended after an altercation with another student about COVID. The Conners surprise Mark and Mary by transforming the Conner home into a Haunted House. D.J. is angry that Mary was moved without his permission. He relents when Mary says she wants to stay with family. Darlene and Dan discuss their differing views on the current political climate.
34	3	"Plastics, Trash Talk & Darlene Antoinette"	Jody Margolin Hahn	Dave Caplan	November 4, 2020	302	4.00
Becky makes friends at Wellman's, but Darlene, feeling the job is beneath her, remains aloof, offending co-workers. When the Lanford Lotus restaurant closes, Jackie considers serving Thai food. During a family poker game, Louise goads Harris into making a large bet. Harris loses and, upset with Louise, storms off. After Darlene finds an unflattering drawing depicting her as Marie Antoinette, her co-workers reject her excuses. They contrast her snobbishness to her late mother, Roseanne's, friendliness. Louise, isolating at the Conner house, tells Dan she needs her own space and is keeping her apartment. Mark struggles with online school because he needs a new computer. Darlene's co-workers help her realize that her job enables her to support her family. Louise makes up with Harris.
35	4	"Birthdays, Babies and Emotional Support Chickens"	Fred Savage	Bruce Rasmussen	November 18, 2020	303	3.65
Louise's veterinarian brother, Neville, asks Jackie out. She declines, uninterested in dating anyone. Dan is furious to discover Emilio is in the country illegally. Jackie accepts a coffee date with Neville but only to explain how emotionally damaged she is. Darlene and Ben's excitement over Darlene being pregnant is short-lived when the doctor says it is a false positive due to Darlene's early-stage menopause (at 43). Darlene is no longer fertile. Emilio goes overboard for Beverly Rose's first birthday party and demands to be more involved in her life. Becky agrees to Beverly Rose being baptized. Darlene and Ben are the godparents, and Dan, who boycotted the event, shows up.
36	5	"Friends in High Places and Horse Surgery"	Fred Savage	Jana & Mitch Hunter	November 25, 2020	305	3.85
Darlene wants Robin, a Wellman supervisor, to mentor her for a management position. Becky receives multiple warnings for excessive video chatting with Beverly Rose during work hours. Neville pursues Jackie, but his small gift evokes an unhappy childhood memory and an extreme reaction. Louise advises Jackie on how to discourage Neville, explaining his excessive determination about everything. Becky wants Darlene to persuade Robin to expunge her work infractions. Robin instead tasks Darlene with deciding Becky's discipline. Darlene docks Becky's pay for missed work time, infuriating Becky, even though it is a lesser sanction than management intended. Jackie asks Neville to stop pursuing her, and they agree to be friends.
37	6	"Protest, Drug Test and One Leaves the Nest"	Lynda Tarryk	Debby Wolfe	December 2, 2020	306	3.58
The family watches the televised Chicago "Share the Wealth" protest. At Wellman's, staff must undergo supervised drug testing. Robin disagrees with the policy and is resigning. Jackie suspects Robin is really quitting because she may be using drugs. Robin tells Becky she is not an addict but transgender and wishes to keep it confidential. Darlene supports Harris protesting but insists she not skip work and must help pay rent. Jackie leads a protest at Wellman's against supervised drug. Wellman's appoints Becky as the drug supervisor and she becomes the union rep, satisfying the employees and preserving Robin's privacy. Craving privacy, Louise has returned to her own apartment, but returns to spend the night with Dan.
38	7	"A Cold Mom, a Brother Daddy and a Prison Baby"	Michael Arden	Jana & Mitch Hunter	January 13, 2021	312	3.89
When Ben's father dies, he is remorseful about their unresolved, troubled relationship. His mother, Barb, stuns Darlene by confiding that Ben's dad was not his biological father. She wants Darlene to tell Ben, and leaves him a note saying Darlene has something important to share. To spare Ben the upsetting truth, Darlene concocts a preposterous story. Barb finally confesses she had a one-night encounter with Ben's deceased biological father and never knew his last name or anything about him. Her husband found out and agreed to raise Ben as his son. Emilio babysits Beverly Rose when Becky goes on a date. Both admit they dislike dating others and begin spending more time together, though Emilio wants more than friendship.
39	8	"Young Love, Old Lions and Middle-Aged Hyenas"	Gail Mancuso	Sid Youngers	January 20, 2021	308	3.18
Harris introduces her fellow "Share the Wealth" protester, Josh, to the family. Becky, Jackie, and Darlene discover Josh regularly attends national protests, live streaming the events and being photographed with a different girl for each cause. The family believes Josh uses women as protest props and is showcasing Harris as the 'poor girl' to symbolize wealth inequality. Harris dismisses Darlene's warning about Josh. Ben starts building Becky a closet for her basement living space, only to incur Dan's wrath. He criticizes Ben's workmanship and claims Becky thinks him too old to build it. Becky insists she just wants Dan to relax after working hard all day; Ben and Dan later compromise about working on the house. Dan privately tells Josh the family knows his history and strongly cautions him to be gentle when breaking-up with Harris.
40	9	"Promotions, Podcasts and Magic Tea"	Gail Mancuso	Amy Fox	January 27, 2021	309	3.52
Darlene is promoted to line supervisor at Wellman Plastics, causing Ben to become dejected over his own stalled career. He reacts by quitting his grocery job and spends $400 on media equipment to produce a regular web podcast about food and true crime. Darlene is dismayed that Ben never consulted her but later supports the endeavor, realizing its importance to him. During a family poker game, Louise mentions having used a "magic" herbal tea during her rock band touring days. Jackie and Neville later try the hallucinogenic brew, causing extreme reactions in both. After recovering, Jackie, appreciating Neville having helped her, sees them possibly having a future together.
41	10	"Who Are Bosses, Boats and Eckhart Tolle?"	Lynda Tarryk	Erica Montolfo-Bura	February 3, 2021	310	3.63
Dan expresses little enthusiasm for his business partner Chuck Mitchell's new boat, inwardly resentful he can barely afford to keep his house. Chuck, offended by Dan's lukewarm reaction, wants to dissolve their partnership. Jackie makes it to the audition phase for Jeopardy. Darlene hires new assistant, Lisa, without thoroughly vetting her, swayed by Lisa's hard-luck story. Darlene soon regrets her decision after Lisa zealously implements stringent employee rules and otherwise takes inappropriate action on Darlene's behalf without permission. Dan and Chuck resolve their issues, but Chuck wants to retire. Darlene fires Lisa after learning she lied to get hired.
42	11	"Panic Attacks, Hardware Store and Big Mouth Billy Bass"	Jude Weng	Bruce Helford & Dave Caplan & Bruce Rasmussen	February 24, 2021	311	3.79
Darlene suffers an extreme panic attack when Robin unexpectedly calls on her during a Wellman's teleconference. Barb asks Ben to take over his late father's hardware store, which would interrupt his new podcast production. Dan's impaired hearing forces him off construction jobs. He accepts a temp job at Ben's hardware store and surprisingly likes it until he and Ben clash over who knows more. Robin gives Darlene a spa gift certificate as an apology for imposing on her during the teleconference. The gift triggers another panic attack when Darlene books an appointment, feeling the spa is too swanky for someone like her. A psychiatrist determines Darlene suffers from feeling unworthy and having unrealized goals and career setbacks. He encourages finding a balance between her new role and old self. Jackie offers advice when Dan admits being too old to continue drywalling. Dan and Ben resolve their differences. Mark colors Jackie's grey hair to prepare for her Jeopardy audition.
43	12	"A Stomach Ache, a Heartbreak and a Grave Mistake"	Michael Arden	Emily Wilson	March 3, 2021	304	3.56
Becky thinks Josh is deliberately avoiding Harris, though Harris defensively claims he is probably protesting elsewhere. Dan claims that Darlene constantly discussing the pandemic is stoking Mark's COVID fears, while she believes being open and truthful is healthier. When Mark's continual stomach pains are diagnosed as extreme anxiety, Darlene promises less COVID talk. Becky learns Josh is deliberately avoiding Harris. Becky and Harris confront Josh and he admits he is no longer interested in Harris. A furious Jackie discovers that Roseanne's neighboring grave, occupied by a once-feuding neighbor, has a disparaging remark about her late sister on the tombstone. When Don Blansky, the cemetery director, says it cannot be changed, Jackie has Roseanne moved to a new plot, reserving the vacated one for her mother, Bev. Dan buys used hearing aids that improve his hearing.
44	13	"Walden Pond, a Staycation and the Axis Powers"	Jody Margolin Hahn	Emily Wilson	March 24, 2021	313	3.45
Jackie reopens the Lunch Box while Dan refurbishes a vintage trailer for him and Louise to travel in. Louise contracts COVID and self-isolates at her apartment. When Jackie suggests the family be tested. Darlene worries she may have infected Louise. Jackie suspects that the nearby Italian, German, and Japanese restaurant owners wrote the negative Yelp reviews about the Lunch Box after she added ethnic dishes to the menu. Neville impresses Jackie with his assertiveness after he intimidates one owner into removing a false review. Everyone tests negative for COVID, but Dan and Ben are angry that Darlene risked infecting the family. Darlene tells Ben she visited a hotel pool to relieve stress, leading to a deeper discussion about their relationship.
45	14	"Money, Booze and Lies"	Lynda Tarryk	Debby Wolfe	March 31, 2021	314	3.26
The family prepares a "care" package for Louise, who is still isolating with COVID. Dan wants a raise after doubling business at Ben's hardware store, then later demands a 25% share in the business. Ben refuses, causing a rift between Dan and Darlene, who attempts to mediate. Becky's old high-school honors rival, Mike Withers, is in town and invites her to dinner. Intimidated by his successful career and embarrassed about her own lackluster life, Becky lies about herself and drinks some wine to avoid revealing she is alcoholic. Becky later tells Darlene about drinking the wine, but insists she is committed to sobriety. Dan again demands that Ben make him a partner, causing a fight. Ben fires Dan, who then evicts Ben.
46	15	"An Old Dog, New Tricks and a Ticket to Ride"	Jude Weng	Erica Montolfo-Bura	April 7, 2021	315	3.39
Dan works odd jobs to pay the mortgage. He refuses to ask Ben for his job back, but tells Darlene he can move back into the house. Ben, living at the hardware store, refuses, wanting him and Darlene to have their own place. Emilio and his cousin, Lupe, care for Beverly Rose while Becky works double shifts to save money for business classes. Becky, despondent that Beverly Rose is more attached to Lupe than her, relapses into drinking. Dan returns to the hardware store after Ben offers him 10% ownership. Ben then gives Darlene six months to allow Dan to become financially stable so they can then find their own place. When former neighbor Molly Tilden returns to Lanford, she and Darlene resolve their old conflicts. Molly has two first-class tickets to Hawaii and offers to take Darlene.
47	16	"A Fast Car, a Sudden Loss and a Slow Decline"	Jean Sagal	Bruce Helford	April 7, 2021	316	3.37
When Darlene suspects Becky is drinking again, Becky claims it is just fatigue and stress from work and caring for Beverly Rose. Darlene decides to accept Molly's Hawaii offer, but after hearing nothing further from her, goes to the Tildens' house. Mrs. Tilden says Molly died the previous night following a seizure from brain cancer. Darlene's driver license is suspended after speeding in a sporty loaner car. Molly has left the Hawaii tickets to Darlene. Ben wants Darlene to cash them in and pay off Dan's bills so they can get their own place sooner, but Darlene wants them to go to Hawaii. Becky, depressed over finances, drinks until passing out, leaving Beverly Rose unattended in her crib. When Jackie finds Becky passed out and Beverly Rose crying, the family demands Becky go into rehab.
48	17	"Regrets, Rehabs and Realtors"	Lynda Tarryk	Dave Caplan	April 14, 2021	317	3.94
The family bids Becky goodbye as she heads to rehab. As a compromise about the Hawaii trip, Darlene proposes a less expensive vacation, expressing her need to get away. Ben refuses, insisting all the money go towards Dan's mortgage so they can move into their own place sooner. Ben's mother, Barb, returns to Lanford and is dismayed to find Ben living in the store. Barb infuriates Dan by suggesting he sell his house, claiming he has a co-dependent relationship with his children so they will support him. When Becky prematurely leaves rehab, saying her drinking problem is not serious, Dan and Jackie insist she return. As Dan considers selling the house, Darlene says she is unsure about moving in with Ben, feeling they have different goals.
49	18	"Cheating, Revelations and a Box of Doll Heads"	Lynda Tarryk	Bruce Rasmussen	April 21, 2021	318	2.98
Mark intensively studies for an entrance exam to a magnet high school. During his online exam, a well-intentioned Darlene sneaks into Mark's room with prompt cards. The examiner discovers what she is doing and immediately disqualifies Mark, devastating him. Dan, Darlene, D.J., and Jackie attend a family therapy session with Becky. Dan blames Becky's late husband, Mark, for selfishly derailing her life. Becky admits her own anger at Mark, but also at herself for abandoning her goals just to be with him. Mark is allowed to retake the exam after it is determined that he had correctly answered the disputed question before Darlene interfered. Robin visits Becky in rehab, saying she is a good person who just needs help staying on track; she expresses appreciation for Becky previously helping her. This episode reveals that Mark died in a motorcycle accident.
50	19	"Jeopardé, Sobrieté and Infidelité"	Jody Margolin Hahn	Dave Caplan & Bruce Helford & Amy Fox	May 12, 2021	319	3.58
Still fuming over Ben's refusal to go to Hawaii, Darlene instead invites her co-worker, Jeff. Barb finds out and confronts Darlene, who insists the trip is platonic. Louise recovers from COVID and returns to the family. Becky completes rehab, then annoys everyone by incessantly preaching about addiction. After Becky embarrasses Mark with an impromptu anti-addiction presentation to his health sciences class, the family insists she stop. Jackie's Jeopardy! episode airs. She finished in the red, then disputed the results on-camera to host Aaron Rodgers (the segment was taped when Rodgers was hosting; at the time this episode aired, Bill Whittaker was hosting Jeopardy! since hosts only did two weeks at the time). She further humiliated herself off-camera and was escorted away in handcuffs. Neville suggests turning her failure into a new goal for success. Darlene sells the Hawaii tickets to put the money towards Dan's mortgage so she and Ben can have their own place.
51	20	"Two Proposals, a Homecoming and a Bear"	Jody Margolin Hahn	Dave Caplan & Bruce Helford & Bruce Rasmussen	May 19, 2021	320	3.38
Darlene is saving money for her and Ben to move in together but worries Dan still needs financial help. Dan and Louise make travel plans after he finishes refurbishing the trailer. Jackie obsessively re-watches her failed Jeopardy appearance, which has made her a minor online sensation. Neil suggests using her notoriety to promote the Lunch Box. Louise accepts Dan's marriage proposal. Darlene proposes to Ben, who says no, saying Darlene puts everyone else and herself ahead of him. He wants time to consider their relationship. Geena decides to retire from the Army to be with family. When Jackie wants to expand the Lunch Box with a beer & wine license and big-screen TVs for sports but thinks it too expensive, Neville offers to finance her plans. Becky quits Wellman Plastics to resume working for Jackie, allowing her to take online classes and spend more time with Beverly Rose.

=== Season 4 (2021–22) ===
No. overall	No. in season	Title	Directed by	Written by	Original release date	Prod. code	U.S. viewers (millions)
52	1	"Trucking Live in Front of a Fully Vaccinated Studio Audience"	Jody Margolin Hahn	Bruce Helford	September 22, 2021	404	3.51
A rift develops over Dan's preference for an inexpensive wedding and Louise wanting a fancier affair. While Becky is at an AA retreat, Harris helps Jackie prepare for the Lunch Box relaunch as a sports bar. Mark is curious about the family's genetic disposition of alcoholism and other issues and begins cold-calling distant Conner relatives to poll them about their own histories. Darlene puts a deposit on an apartment as proof she wants to be with Ben. He agrees to consider reconciling but permanently ends their relationship upon discovering that Darlene invited Jeff to go to Hawaii, despite Darlene's claims it was platonic. A psychic advises Darlene to seek a higher power to find spiritual peace. This episode was performed live twice for Eastern and Pacific time zones. The episode featured several fourth wall breaks, including a segment where Sara Gilbert (Darlene) sprints across the sets. The episode also included segments where Mark calls distant Conner relatives for a school project. The distant family members were played by people selected by a contest organized by ABC who were selected and called live on air. There were two sets of calls for the two live performances.
53	2	"Education, Corruption, Damnation"	Lynda Tarryk	Bruce Helford & Bruce Rasmussen & Dave Caplan	September 29, 2021	401	3.47
Mark and Becky start their respective new schools. Becky is intimidated by much younger college classmates, while Mark is challenged by a rigorous curriculum. Ben drops off Darlene's personal items, leaving her despondent. An avowed atheist, Darlene attends church with Becky, hoping to connect to God. She abruptly leaves during Pastor Phil's sermon after finding Roseanne's note inside her old bible: Roseanne pleaded for God's help to overcome her opioid addiction. Darlene believes God abandoned her mother but Becky has a different opinion. Meanwhile, cemetery owner/city councilmember Don Blansky will expedite Jackie's delayed liquor license in exchange for a $500 "donation" to his "cemetery beautification" fund. Jackie refuses to be extorted, but Dan urges her to pay after the liquor permit for his and Louise's wedding is declined. It later appears that Neville made the donation, but Jackie admits to paying it.
54	3	"Sober Sex, Plastic Silverware and Losing My Religion"	Michael Fishman	Bruce Rasmussen	October 6, 2021	402	3.15
After Darlene abruptly left Pastor Phil's sermon, he advises she can find spiritual guidance outside of religion. Darlene overly-injects herself into the wedding plans, causing Louise to exclude her from wedding dress shopping, Darlene angrily shows up at the bridal shop, then storms off. Becky works on her sobriety steps, including making amends to anyone she wronged or deceived. She contacts Mike, her old high school friend, and confesses to lying about her life. Becky says she is ready for sober sex, but when Mike wants to pursue a relationship, she says it is too soon in her recovery. Louise and Darlene make amends after Dan points out that Darlene, upset over Ben, was attempting to plan what her own wedding would have been.
55	4	"The Wedding of Dan and Louise"	Jody Margolin Hahn	Dave Caplan	October 13, 2021	403	3.59
Louise nearly cancels the wedding when plans continually goes awry. Learning Ben is bringing a "plus one", Darlene invites Jeff, who she invited to go to Hawaii. She then discovers Ben's date is his mother. The family barely make it to the church during a severe storm. Everyone bickers while waiting for Louise to arrive. Becky panics and fears a relapse after accidentally sipping champagne; her friend Mike calms her, and they end up having sex in the men's bathroom. Harris surprises Darlene by introducing Aldo, her 38-year-old, tattoo-artist boyfriend. Louise finally arrives, but a tornado warning siren interrupts the ceremony. Everyone scrambles for cover when the chapel's windows are blown out. Dan wants to continue the ceremony, and Jackie, an Internet-ordained minister, steps in to officiate.
56	5	"Peter Pan, the Backup Plan, Adventures in Babysitting and a River Runs Through It"	Robbie Countryman	Jana & Mitch Hunter	October 27, 2021	405	3.33
When Dan and Louise's honeymoon is postponed due to the tornado, Darlene and Becky give them a virtual one instead. Darlene meets Aldo's odd adolescent sons. Darlene and Jackie go to a spiritual bookstore/vegan café. The owner, Darlene's old high-school classmate, recommends a Tao lecture to help Darlene's spiritual healing. Incorporating Tao principles, Darlene tries to scare off Harris from moving in with Aldo off, but the plan backfires. While Emilio and Becky work out Beverly Rose's schedule, Becky is dismayed that Emilio is dating someone. Dan advises Darlene and Becky to move on from their respective failed relationships. Jackie copes with rowdy customers after turning the Lunch Box into a sports bar.
57	6	"Young Love, Old Love and Take This Job and Shove It"	Lynda Tarryk	Emily Wilson	November 3, 2021	406	3.09
Dan and Louise cancel their honeymoon after learning insurance does not cover tornado damage. As the Lunch Box flourishes, Becky finds balancing work and school difficult. She also believes younger classmates are excluding her from study groups and confronts a group leader. Mark meets 14-year-old Logan, who is staying with Neville while his parents' divorce. Logan is also gay and, during Conner movie night, the boys make out in Mark's bedroom. Mark worries that if he is unwilling to do more, Logan will lose interest. Ben encourages a reluctant Mark to talk to Darlene, then advises Darlene to just listen to her kids and allow them to make decisions. Jackie is frustrated that Becky's education interferes with work. Becky decides to work part-time. Ben and Darlene gradually become friendlier.
58	7	"Let's All Push Our Hands Together for the Stew Train and the Conners' Furniture"	Jody Margolin Hahn	Erica Montolfo-Bura	November 17, 2021	407	3.47
Louise wants to replace Dan's shabby furniture with her own, but the Conner kids are sentimentally attached to everything. Louise agrees to store her belongings if Dan buys them a new bedroom set. Darlene meets Nick, a former stockbroker and recovering addict, now working at the metaphysical bookstore/vegan café. He attempts to mediate between Darlene and Harris, but their conflict escalates when Darlene criticizes Harris for paying Aldo's rent, in addition to providing free childcare. Harris storms out, intending to move in with Aldo, but he claims their relationship is causing his boys' behavioral problems and suggests she stay elsewhere. Harris tries returning home, but Darlene insists she move out to save their mother/daughter relationship. Meanwhile, Jackie's attempts to make the restaurant more unique fail badly. Darlene and Nick start dating.
59	8	"Yard Sale, Phone Fail, and a College Betrayal"	Jody Margolin Hahn	Mark Kunerth	December 1, 2021	408	3.31
Dan has a yard sale to raise cash for a new bedroom set but overprices everything, scaring off potential buyers. Nick's refusal to own a phone sows Darlene's doubt about his trustworthiness. She gives him a burner phone, but Nick turns the tables by challenging Darlene to go without hers for one day. Becky discovers that Harris is not living with Aldo and is paying to sleep on a stranger's sofa. Jackie helps Darlene realize that her trust issues are about herself, not Nick. Becky is angry after a young, single mother she has been mentoring takes advantage; Jackie tells Becky that not every person wants help and she is projecting her own past failures onto others. Dan ceremonially burns his and Roseanne's old bedroom set to free himself from the past. Nick agrees to keep the phone so he and Darlene can text each other.
60	9	"Three Exes, Role Playing and a Waterbed"	Michael Fishman	Dave Caplan	January 5, 2022	409	2.92
Jackie's planned romantic evening with Neville dissolves when he brings Logan, who attempted to sneak beer. Neville says Logan's mother, Helen, is moving to Lanford and Logan will soon be living with her. While Louise and her band are on tour, Dan buys a waterbed, though Becky thinks it is outdated. Darlene spends the night with Nick, who lives above the bookstore. Ben meets Nick and invites him for a beer at the Lunch Box. While there, Darlene and Ben squabble over their past relationship issues. Nick concludes they have unresolved feelings and breaks up with Darlene. Jackie discovers Helen is far more attractive than Neville described, is working at his vet clinic, and that they were once engaged.
61	10	"Spills, Pills and the Midnight Lasagna"	Lynda Tarryk	Bruce Helford	January 12, 2022	410	3.27
After Mark makes the Dean's list at magnet school, Darlene discovers he is illegally taking ADHD medication, partly supplied by Logan. Mark confesses magnet school is demanding and the pills helped improve his "C" average. Jackie, insecure about Neville and Helen, acts like a decrepit old lady while recuperating from a sprained ankle. Neville assures Jackie their age difference is irrelevant; he arranges a job for Helen in another town that will be closer to Logan's father. Darlene re-enrolls him in public school after discovering he had replaced the HDHD medication with massive quantities of caffeine to keep up with his schoolwork. When Dan and Becky discover Harris living in Dan's backyard trailer, they promise to keep it secret from Darlene.
62	11	"Patriarchs and Goddesses"	Michael Fishman	Jana & Mitch Hunter	January 19, 2022	411	3.01
Aldo's father, Jesse, surprises Dan by saying that Aldo is an immature, unstable 38-year-old man-child who is too old for the teen-aged Harris. While at a movie with Becky, Darlene sees Ben with a date. Darlene continually goes over to talk to them, making the encounter so awkward that the couple leave. Darlene later tells Ben that she is having difficulty seeing him with someone else. Ben is understanding but prefers an easier relationship to their volatile one. Darlene assures Ben she is ready to move on emotionally. Ignoring everyone's advice, Harris and Aldo decide to move in together.
63	12	"Hot for Teacher and Writing a Wrong"	Lynda Tarryk	Bruce Rasmussen	February 2, 2022	412	3.26
Mark struggles to readjust to public school. Becky suspects her psychology professor, Glen Davis, is romantically interested in her. When Darlene finds $500 hidden in Mark's bedroom dresser, Harris thinks he may be selling drugs; other family members mention recently seeing strange kids coming to the house. Darlene confronts Mark, who explains he earns money for college by writing other students' application essays. Darlene forces him to stop, saying it is unethical and could jeopardize his own college admission if found out. She suggests an alternative means to affording college. When Glen tells Becky he is attracted to her, she suggests they have dinner. Becky also, during her conversation with Mark, takes a shot at Jackie's appearance on Jeopardy! by referring to the vaccination status of its host when she made an appearance.
64	13	"Sex, Lies and House Hunting"	Michael Arden	Amy Fox	February 23, 2022	413	3.01
Darlene's hope to buy a house are dashed when the realtor says single women are less likely to secure a loan. Glen and Becky are spotted together by two students. To hide their relationship, Becky accepts the girls' invitation to attend a singles event. Darlene asks Ben to pose as her partner to improve chances of securing a loan. When another couple outbids her, Ben offers to co-sign for a loan. Darlene declines, saying she needs to be completely independent. At the singles event, Becky is coerced into accepting a date with a guy she meets. She later apologizes to Glen, who understands it was to cover up their relationship.
65	14	"Triggered"	Michael Arden	Lecy Goranson	March 2, 2022	414	3.27
Louise returns from touring just as the police put the neighborhood on lockdown after a shooting at the Lanford Mall. As the family shelters at home, Becky is frantic about Beverly Rose, who is with Emilio at the mall; Emilio calls saying they are safe. Mary uses her school shooter drill training to help secure the house, while Dan gets his gun. The TV news identifies the shooter as James McNulty, Harris' former high school classmate. The entire family is traumatized seeing James fatally shot on live TV. The next day, Becky is overly protective of Beverly Rose, Mary refuses to go to school, and Jackie is generally distraught over the constant misery and violence on her social media. Dan is angry that Harris sold his gun to the police without his knowledge. When neighbors stop by collecting donations for the shooting victim's family, Dan donates the money Harris was paid for his gun.
66	15	"Messy Situation, Miscommunication and Academic Probation"	Michael Fishman	Shelley Dennis	March 16, 2022	415	2.93
Glen quits his teaching job after Becky's careless text message exposes their relationship. Glen, trying to be upbeat, says he can now write a novel, though he has no ideas for a plot and doubts his abilities. Darlene and Dan stop by Chuck Mitchell's house, finding both it and Chuck in disarray. Chuck reveals that Anne Marie had a stroke and is in the hospital. Chuck refuses their help, claiming Chuck Jr. will soon be there. Darlene later learns that Chuck Jr. lives too far away to come. She insists Dan reach out to Chuck. Becky tells school administrators that she sent Glen the text message because she was romantically infatuated and there was no relationship. Glen is rehired and Becky receives academic probation. Becky realizes Glen is just too passive and unfocused and ends their relationship. Dan returns to Chuck's house, insisting he is going to help out.
67	16	"Gas Pump, House Dump and Stew Volcano"	Jody Margolin Hahn	Cory Caplan	March 23, 2022	416	3.02
Louise gradually moves her belongings into the house as more Conners prepare to move out. Mortician Don Blansky is relocating his business to a larger place and offers Darlene a fantastic deal on his hard-to-sell Victorian house/funeral home. After Ben's "gas pump" commercial increases his hardware sales, he offers to help produce one for the Lunch Box; he soon clashes with Jackie over her zany ideas. When Jackie admits how overwhelming running the Lunchbox is and considers selling it, Ben offers some labor-saving suggestions. Darlene passes on the Victorian house, considering its history too sad to live there. Louise suggests that Darlene buy it and, with Dan's help, tear it down and build a new house.
68	17	"Big Negotiations and Broken Expectations"	Lynda Tarryk	Jana & Mitch Hunter	April 13, 2022	417	2.77
Louise storms out, claiming Dan always puts the family before her after he cancels their going to a rock concert to babysit for Becky at the last minute. Darlene asks her boss Robin for a raise after failing to calculate all homeowner for her new house. Robin says they both deserve raises and together confront Wellman manager Marcus with an ultimatum: more money or else they quit. Marcus agrees they are deserving but says only line workers are receiving raises to retain them. Darlene and Robin resign; Robin is certain the company will negotiate, though a distraught Darlene is skeptical. Dan apologizes to Louise and agrees to help the family less often. Wellman's offers Robin and Darlene their jobs back at higher salaries.
69	18	"The Best Laid Plans, a Contrabassoon and a Sinking Feeling"	Robbie Countryman	Emily Wilson	May 4, 2022	418	3.04
Darlene resents Ben making suggestions about building a new house. While inspecting the old Victorian's roof, they argue about their failed relationship. Darlene suddenly falls through a rotted portion, landing on the first floor; Ben rushes Darlene to the E.R., though she is not seriously hurt. Ben realizes he loves Darlene and proposes, which Darlene accepts. Meanwhile, to increase his chances for a college scholarship, Mark starts contrabassoon lessons with Bev's friend, Lou (Christopher Lloyd). Dan objects to Lou's overly strict and demanding teaching method and fires him. Mark is upset that his scholarship hopes are jeopardized, forcing Dan to persuade Lou to continue teaching Mark.
70	19	"Three Ring Circus"	Lynda Tarryk	Amy Fox	May 11, 2022	419	2.74
Ben and Darlene arrive home, but before announcing their engagement, Neville proposes to Jackie, which inspires Aldo to spontaneously ask Harris; the two couples plan a double wedding. Overshadowed by the commotion, Darlene and Ben keep their renewed relationship secret. Later, Becky, Louise, and Jesse unsuccessfully attempt to persuade Harris she is too young to get married and that Aldo is the wrong man, leaving Darlene to unhappily accept the situation. When Dan discovers Ben and Darlene about to elope, he guilts them into a triple wedding ceremony with Jackie & Neville and Harris & Aldo. Harris is taken aback by Aldo wanting a baby right away.
71	20	"A Judge and a Priest Walk into a Living Room..."	Jody Margolin Hahn	Bruce Helford, Bruce Rasmussen & Dave Caplan	May 18, 2022	420	2.92
Darlene & Ben, Jackie & Neville, and Harris & Aldo, opt for a triple wedding at the Conner house. After discovering Aldo changed their wedding registry to a baby shower, Harris breaks up with him, not ready to have children. Neville wants a priest to officiate for him and Jackie, while a non-secular judge will perform the other ceremony. Ben alters the plans to the new house, changing Becky's quarters into a music room. Becky assumes he does not want her to move in, but Darlene assures Becky she wants her and Beverly Rose to be there. Harris is a bridesmaid along with Becky, as Darlene & Ben and Jackie & Neville are married. Louise consoles Dan, who is sad that everyone will be moving out. Final Appearance of Michael Fishman as DJ Conner.

=== Season 5 (2022–23) ===
No. overall	No. in season	Title	Directed by	Written by	Original release date	Prod. code	U.S. viewers (millions)
72	1	"Double Honeymoon and Seeing Double"	Jody Margolin Hahn	Bruce Helford	September 21, 2022	501	3.73
Mark is upset that Harris wants to live with Dan & Louise rather than at the new house. To economize, Darlene & Ben and Jackie & Neville share a vacation cottage for their respective honeymoons only to discover the two bedrooms are not entirely separate, allowing little privacy. Darlene is jealous that Jackie and Neville are more romantically demonstrative than her and Ben. Darlene offends Jackie with unfunny remarks about Jackie's long wait to find a husband. While Louise is touring, the remaining family spends the weekend at a waterpark. Upset about Logan's new boyfriend, Mark consoles himself with beer from the motel room minifridge. Harris tries stopping him, then joins in, even though Mark is underage. They become drunk and leave the bathtub faucet running, causing a flood. Darlene has a stern talk with Harris and Mark about responsible drinking.
73	2	"Scenes from Two Marriages: The Parrot Doth Protest Too Much"	Robbie Countryman	Dave Caplan	September 28, 2022	503	3.47
Darlene squashes Ben's plans for an artsy evening out, preferring TV and take-out food. To mollify him, Darlene agrees to attend a "Drunk Romeo & Juliet" play, but abruptly leaves mid-performance. After Dan encourages Darlene to more fully live life, she apologizes to Ben and proposes going out twice a week, each picking an activity. Meanwhile, Neville has been bringing animals home from the clinic. When Jackie finally objects, Neville confesses he only brought them home because he fears they will run out of things to talk about and she will leave him. Jackie assures Neville they do not need to talk all the time to be happy.
74	3	"Driving, Dating and Deceit"	Jody Margolin Hahn	Jana & Mitch Hunter	October 5, 2022	502	3.61
Darlene believes Mark is considering distant colleges to escape her, but Dan says him wanting to leave Lanford is a positive thing. Becky realizes that Harris' online dating match is Steve, a man she dated one time and that ended badly, though Becky is unable to remember why. Darlene annoys Mark while helping him practice for his driving test. With Ben's help, Mark secretly takes the test to prevent Darlene interfering. Becky has mixed feelings when Emilio, who received his green card, gives her their divorce papers and invites her to his wedding. Becky meets with Steve who says their date ended badly because she became drunk. After they agree to a "do over" date, Harris is initially annoyed, then gives her approval. Mark assures Darlene his college choices are only about exploring new horizons.
75	4	"Parent Traps and Heart Attacks"	Robbie Countryman	Bruce Rasmussen	October 12, 2022	504	3.63
When Neville and Louise's estranged brother, Aaron, dies suddenly, they resist taking in his troubled son, Caleb. Jackie decides Caleb should live with her and Neville. Darlene and Becky worry that a reclusive Mary may be depressed due to her parents' extended absence. Caleb is hostile and surly and resents Louise and Neville ignoring him despite knowing Aaron was unstable and troubled. He appears to bond with Harris, only to hit on her for sex. Jackie demands that Caleb return stolen items from the house. Mary is not depressed but has been hiding that she has a boyfriend, fearing the family will embarrass her. Neville and Jackie give written permission for underaged Caleb to join the U.S. Marines.
76	5	"A Little Weed and a Bad Seed"	Lynda Tarryk	Emily Wilson	October 19, 2022	505	3.62
Beverly Rose's kindergarten teacher says she is overly-interactive in class, preventing other students from participating. Jackie tries psychic healing for Dan's bursitis pain while Harris recommends edible pot. When Becky tells Beverly Rose to be less assertive in class, Darlene claims the teacher is molding Beverly Rose into a passive female afraid to express an opinion or show intelligence. Jackie helps Dan after he consumes too many pot edibles. Becky eventually agrees with Darlene and confronts the teacher.
77	6	"Book Bans and Guillotine Hands"	Lynda Tarryk	Cory Caplan	October 26, 2022	506	3.93
The family claims they are too busy for Halloween decorating, leaving a frustrated Becky to do it alone. Darlene's future new neighbors complain about certain books containing flyers regarding school censorship that were left in Darlene's new mini-lending library. Harris says she put the flyers in and is upset when Darlene appeases the neighborhood rather than support her. With everyone soon moving out, Dan worries the Conner Halloween tradition will die. After Louise chastises the family, they surprise Dan by turning Darlene and Ben's unfinished residence into a Halloween haunted house. Darlene proves that she does support Harris protesting banned books. A montage of past Conner Halloweens ends the episode.
78	7	"Take This Job and Shove It Twice"	Jody Margolin Hahn	Shelley Dennis	November 2, 2022	507	3.72
Darlene is promoted as Wellman Plastics' new public relations spokesperson, despite lacking experience. Louise loses her manager job at Casita Bonita after the owners close the restaurant, saying they can no longer be profitable if employees unionize. Darlene learns Wellman's only promoted her to be a "trustworthy face" to publicly deny the company is polluting Lanford's water supply. Refusing to cover up the scandal, Darlene quits. Conflicts arise after Louise starts working at the Lunchbox and irritates Jackie by offering too many ideas on improving business.
79	8	"Of Missing Minds and Missing Fries"	Robbie Countryman	Jana & Mitch Hunter	November 16, 2022	509	3.96
Darlene interviews for two managerial positions. She loses one after Mr. Wellman, Darlene's former boss, gives her a bad reference. Darlene is offered the other job for a low salary. When Darlene's counter-offer is rejected, she lambasts the owner for being greedy and exploiting workers. Harris thinks Bev has dementia, but Jackie claims her mother is faking for sympathy. Jackie confronts Bev about her being so critical and negative to her all her life, but quickly realizes Bev is genuinely cognitive impaired. Jackie resolves to look after her mother. Vegan Darlene surprises the family by cooking a turkey for Thanksgiving dinner.
80	9	"Crumbs and Couch Surfers"	Robbie Countryman	Emily Wilson	November 30, 2022	510	4.19
After moving into their house, Darlene forbids anyone from eating or drinking on the new white couch, though the family says spills are inevitable. Harris meets Kai, a penniless itinerant poet. Harris gives Kai money to photocopy and distribute his poems. When Kai steals Dan's pot stash, Louise says he is using Harris, though she brushes it off. Darlene is furious after Becky and Ben panicked and blamed Beverly Rose for a juice spill on the couch. Jackie helps Darlene understand why she is over-protecting the couch. Meanwhile, Harris discovers Kai misused the money she gave him and stole additional cash, prompting Louise to throw him out. Darlene promises to be less uptight and controlling.
81	10	"The Dog Days of Christmas"	Trevor Kirschner	Bruce Rasmussen	December 7, 2022	511	3.82
During Louise's tour break, her estranged mother, Doris, unexpectedly arrives at the Conner house, announcing that her husband has left her. Doris has bought a new RV and wants to drive Louise when she is on tour to prove she supports her daughter's music career. Louise suspects her mother's offer is because she fears being alone but agrees an RV would make touring easier. Beverly Rose starts acting like a puppy when Becky decides to skip Emilio's wedding. Darlene helps Becky understand that Beverly Rose's dog-like behavior is about Emilio re-marrying and Becky being alone; Becky assures Beverly Rose she is fine and agrees to attend the wedding. Jackie warns off Doris when she wants to take Neville on a cross-country trip to visit zoos.
82	11	"Two More Years and a Stolen Rose"	Jody Margolin Hahn	Bruce Helford & Bruce Rasmussen	January 11, 2023	508	4.15
Dan receives a $6000 increased mortgage payment. Meanwhile, Smitty (William H. Macy), Dan's high school rival for Roseanne, arrives for their high school English teacher's funeral. At the Lobo Lounge, wealthy Smitty gives Dan a check for the mortgage, which Dan promises to repay. Smitty then deliberately humiliates Dan by falsely claiming to the entire Lobo crowd that Dan begged him for the money. Smitty tells Dan it is payback for him stealing Roseanne. Meanwhile, Becky asks to live with Ben and Darlene for an additional two years to pursue a Master's degree. At the funeral, Mrs Willen's former students read letters she assigned them to write to their future selves. Dan reads his and realizes he is successful in what matters in life. He apparently rips up Smitty's check, then secretly tells Louise he already cashed it and actually tore up a $2.00 cable rebate. Smitty later apologizes.
83	12	"Stuck in the Middle and Stuck in the Past"	Jody Margolin Hahn	Teleplay by : Dave Caplan & Emily Wilson; Story by : Bruce Helford & Jana Hunter & Mitch Hunter	January 18, 2023	512	4.19
Darlene and Ben argue over his long hours at the hardware store and working at home. Becky gets dragged into the dispute, causing her class assignment to be electronically submitted late, affecting her grade. Meanwhile, Dan insists he gave Jackie the family's home movies and videos to be digitized. Jackie denies he gave them to her and claims Dan's memory is faulty. After Becky's class grade is lowered, she confronts Ben and Darlene about respecting personal boundaries, then helps them understand what they are really arguing about. Jackie finds the videos stashed in Dan's kitchen cupboard, which he apparently forgot. To make peace, Jackie secretly takes them, then tells Dan that she had forgotten they were at her house and will have them digitized.
84	13	"New Pipes and Old Secrets"	Lynda Tarryk	Teleplay by : Bruce Helford & Jana Hunter & Mitch Hunter; Story by : Dave Caplan & Emily Wilson	February 8, 2023	513	4.21
Dan agrees to fix the plumbing in Darlene's house but will only come after his and Chuck's "guy's night out". The next morning, Darlene finds Dan sleeping on the couch. Dan says the job is more complicated and continually arrives late at night, then falls asleep on the couch without repairing anything. Meanwhile, Jackie interviews a licensed caretaker for Bev, but determines she is too expensive. The nurse offers a free one-week trial. Dan admits having trouble sleeping since Roseanne died and constantly worries about the family after everyone moved out. After the nurse discovers Bev's decades-old, improperly healed broken arm, Bev reveals that Al, her abusive late husband, broke it; she prevented him hitting Jackie and Roseanne. Jackie hires the nurse, and the family takes turns spending nights at Dan's house until his sleep issue is resolved.
85	14	"Adding Insult To Injury"	Robbie Countryman	Cindy Caponera	February 15, 2023	514	3.57
Dan says Darlene's combative and condescending nature is preventing her getting a job. After a minor fall at work, Becky wants to falsely file a Worker's Comp claim so she can spend more time at home with Beverly Rose. Neville warns Jackie that Becky's scheme is insurance fraud and both could face serious consequences if caught. Becky is furious after Jackie refuses to file the claim, saying she is overwhelmed and needs help. Neville tells Becky the family often supports her and she is overly co-dependent. Meanwhile, Darlene alters her appearance and demeanor for the next job interview. When offered the position, she feels disingenuous and declines it, showing the interviewer her true self. He then offers her a managerial position in accounts receivables suitable to her assertive personality.
86	15	"Possums, Pregnancy and Patriarchy"	Robbie Countryman	Susan McMartin	February 22, 2023	515	3.75
Harris is pregnant and says the father is Kai, the itinerant poet who stole from the family (in Episode 9). Ben is stressed with too many family demands and responsibilities and worries about falling behind on the house mortgage. When Dan scores a big construction order for the hardware store, Ben's financial concerns seemingly disappear until he discovers Dan gave the customer a huge discount, claiming it will generate more business. After much family input, Harris decides to have the baby. Darlene is disappointed with Harris' decision but fully supports her.
87	16	"Hiding In and Moving Out"	Jody Margolin Hahn	Molly Kiernan	March 1, 2023	518	3.44
Shortly after moving in with Darlene and Ben, Harris suffers a miscarriage. Even though Darlene is supportive and sympathetic, Harris claims her mother is actually glad she lost the baby; she then moves back to Dan's house. Louise retires from touring, but is depressed by no longer having a specific purpose in life. Dan offers suggestions, including teaching music, which Louise considers. Darlene assures Harris she truly regrets her loss and convinces her to move back with her and Ben, leaving Mark with the living room alcove as his bedroom.
88	17	"The Contra Hearings and The Midnight Gambler"	Jody Margolin Hahn	Teleplay by : Bruce Helford & Emily Wilson; Story by : Jana Hunter & Mitch Hunter	March 8, 2023	516	3.74
Jackie installs a lottery machine to increase business at the Lunch Box. When another contrabassoon player transfers to Mark's high school, Mark must audition to remain in the school's chamber orchestra, possibly lessening his chances for a college scholarship. The family goes all-out to impress Miss Glen (Whoopi Goldberg), Mark's prickly music teacher. Complicating matters, Glen holds a grudge against Jackie from their high school days. Meanwhile, Becky spends an entire paycheck secretly playing the lottery machine, hoping to win the big prize. When Dan confronts her, saying it is another addiction, Becky promises to stop. After the music audition, Miss Glen chooses the new student. She says Mark is equally proficient but the competitor won because he is passionate about music while Mark only wanted a college scholarship.
89	18	"Road Trip and Guilt Trip"	Jody Margolin Hahn	Daniel Spector	March 15, 2023	517	3.87
Jackie borrows a friend's big rig to drive Dan to a huge hardware liquidation sale in Tulsa, Oklahoma. During the trip, Dan and Jackie squabble over Jackie's refusal to loan Dan money to buy more inventory. Jackie confides she lacks funds because Neville separates their finances, stoking fears he eventually intends to leave her. When Becky complains about more housework heaped on her, Darlene admits being jealous over Becky and Harris spending time together. Darlene hoped she and Harris would grow closer. At Dan's urging, Jackie calls Neville, who explains he separates their finances only to prevent the Conner family from grifting money. Jackie is reassured and asks that $1,000 be transferred to her account, which she secretly loans to Dan. Neville is unaware that Dan overheard the conversation.
90	19	"Text Thread and The Marital Bed"	Jody Margolin Hahn	Susan McMartin	April 5, 2023	519	3.64
Jackie, Darlene, and Louise celebrate their collective one year of marriage; Darlene later confides to Jackie that lately, she and Ben are rarely intimate. As the family prepares to celebrate Easter, Louise mistakenly sends an unflattering text about Becky to the Conner's family thread. Becky is furious and rebuffs Louise's apology. When Darlene tries enticing Ben, he remains uninterested. Meanwhile, Dan mediates between Louise and Becky by reading aloud unkind text messages that all family members have occasionally sent. He encourages everyone to be nicer. Darlene confronts Ben about their tepid love-life. He feels going from publishing his own magazine to running a hardware store is a personal and professional setback. The many family and business responsibilities have left him stressed and feeling unsexy. They agree to work on being more romantic.
91	20	"What's So Funny About Peas, Love and Understanding?"	Robbie Countryman	Teleplay by : Hunter Rasmussen; Story by : Bruce Rasmussen	April 19, 2023	520	3.66
Mark delays telling Darlene he lost the music scholarship, not wanting to ruin her celebrating the new job. When Ben mentions some schools offer reduced tuition for employees' children, Darlene applies to the nearby college where Mark was accepted. The only available job is as a cafeteria line worker, which Dan discourages Darlene from accepting, saying it is too big a career setback at her age. Meanwhile, Jackie and Louise maneuver to find Becky a date, resulting in her meeting Tyler, a pleasant FedEx pilot who asks her out. Knowing how much Darlene wants to help Mark, Ben encourages her to take the cafeteria job, allowing Mark to attend college tuition-free.
92	21	"Dating, Drinking and Grifter Logic"	Jody Margolin Hahn	Teleplay by : Cameron Griggs-Posey; Story by : Bruce Rasmussen	April 26, 2023	521	3.24
Dan confronts Neville for previously calling the family "grifters." Neville storms out, furious that Jackie revealed that and lying about loaning Dan money. When Neville fails to come home, Jackie demands that Dan find him. Meanwhile, Darlene introduces Mark to James, her student cafeteria co-worker; Mark quickly realizes James is too emotionally needy. Dan finds a drunken Neville at the Lobo Lounge. Dan apologizes and says Jackie was only doing him a favor and that families help each other, something Neville and Louise rarely experienced growing up. Dan is wrongly arrested for DUI after forcefully preventing Neville driving drunk. Dan later says he was protecting Neville who is family, and a DUI arrest could have ended his veterinary practice. A grateful Neville agrees to pay Dan's legal expenses.
93	22	"The Grad Finale"	Jody Margolin Hahn	Teleplay by : Dave Caplan & Emily Wilson; Story by : Bruce Helford & Jana Hunter & Mitch Hunter	May 3, 2023	522	3.65
Mark can only invite three people to his High School Graduation. Darlene is upset that he asks his absent father, David rather than Ben. Louise offers to host a graduation party at the Lunch Box, then contends with everyone requesting different fun activities. Mark realizes how much Ben has done for him and disinvites David. Mark and Louise hold a family graduation ceremony for Dan, Becky, Jackie, and Harris, who either had disappointing commencements or earned a GED. The family then heads to a game arcade to enjoy their preferred activity.

=== Season 6 (2024) ===
No. overall	No. in season	Title	Directed by	Written by	Original release date	Prod. code	U.S. viewers (millions)
94	1	"The Publisher Cops Show Pilot"	Jody Margolin Hahn	Bruce Helford & Bruce Rasmussen & Dave Caplan	February 7, 2024	603	3.59
Tired of Jackie slacking off at the Lunch Box, Becky contacts Restaurant 911, a reality TV show that helps struggling businesses. While in Chicago with Dan, Darlene runs into Amanda, an old publishing colleague who is now a successful writer. Later, Darlene claims Dan "talked her up" in front of Amanda because he is embarrassed that she works at a cafeteria. Dan says Darlene was tearing herself down to Amanda and insists Darlene has accomplished much, always puts family first, and will pursue her goals once Mark graduates. Meanwhile, "911" host Chef Chestnut says Jackie must choose between running a business or a personal life. Jackie admits having lost the passion for the restaurant since marrying Neville. Chef Chestnut suggests Harris manage the Lunch Box, citing her good suggestions and insights.
95	2	"Valentine's Day Treats and Credit Card Cheats"	Jody Margolin Hahn	Shelley Dennis	February 14, 2024	601	3.38
Tyler tries to bribe Beverly Rose into accepting him as Becky's boyfriend. Darlene and Ben plan for a romantic Valentine's Day in Chicago. Jackie thinks Bev's credit card number was stolen, then discovers she is making outlandishly expensive purchases. When Darlene later remembers that Roseanne's credit card debt was eliminated after she died, the family decides to cash in. Becky stops Tyler giving cash to Beverly Rose, who is becoming greedy and entitled. Becky assures Tyler that Beverly Rose will like him for himself. The family panics when the credit card company investigate the recent expensive purchases on Bev's card.
96	3	"Moms and Rats"	Jody Margolin Hahn	Bruce Helford	February 21, 2024	602	3.47
When the credit card company actively investigates the unauthorized purchases on Bev's card, Darlene urges Dan to convince Bev that she made them. Bev's memory and cognition have greatly improved due to an experimental drug. She surprises Jackie by wanting to spend a quality mother-daughter day together in Chicago. At Union Station, Bev boards a train, wanting a final grand adventure. Before leaving, Bev tells Jackie that she notified the credit card company that she made the charges and wants the family to enjoy what they scammed. Meanwhile, Darlene insists Ben only use humane traps to catch a rat in the house. When Ben sets out a kill trap, Darlene angrily claims he often dismisses her views and concerns. Ben promises to be more attentive.
97	4	"Shrinks Don't Talk and Kids Don't Sing"	Robbie Countryman	Dave Caplan	February 28, 2024	604	3.36
Becky recruits Louise to teach music appreciation at Beverly Rose's school. The principal interrupts Louise singing an ABBA song, saying some parents may complain it is about gay people. Louise intends to follow the school's ban to continue teaching, but Jackie is outraged and Becky is disappointed by Louise's neutral stance. Meanwhile, Darlene worries after seeing Mark leaving the college psychologist's office. Mark later admits being unhappy he is unable to make school friends and join college groups because being a "commuter student" restricts his time on campus. Louise decides to run for the school board to make changes. Darlene finds Mark a student job which provides a small salary and free student housing.
98	5	"When Sisters Collide and The Return of the Grifters"	Jody Margolin Hahn	Cory Caplan	March 13, 2024	608	3.41
Darlene and Becky spar over who is better educated. When the family discovers Dan is serving community service, Neville becomes angry that he used the $500 he gave him for the DUI case for another purpose. Darlene, insulted by Mark's condescending classmates, competes at their pub trivia night to prove she is more knowledgeable. Becky is competing with another team and the two sisters tie for top score. When they start squabbling, both are ejected. After, Becky assures Darlene that her cafeteria job does not mean she is intellectually inferior and that Darlene inspired her to overcome personal problems to achieve an education. Neville learns that Dan gave the $500 to Crystal, his father's widow, to pay for her heart medication.
99	6	"Hanging in Dorms with Boys and The Secret Life of Men"	Robbie Countryman	Molly Kiernan & Daniel Spector	March 20, 2024	605	3.32
Ben dreads turning 50, so Darlene suggests talking with other middle-aged men. Tyler and Becky become more intimate. Harris agrees to buy alcohol for Mark and his under-aged dorm mates. While Ben, Tyler, Neville, and Dan are at the Lobo, Darlene, Becky, and Jackie enjoy "girls night" at the Conner house. They soon discover the men are somewhere else, and speculate on everything from bowling to a strip club. Mark gets upset with Harris spending too much time hanging out with him and his college friends. Meanwhile, Ben, Neville, Tyler, and Dan camp out at Neville's clinic, discussing their romantic relationships. Darlene confronts Harris about crowding Mark, causing Harris to express regrets about never attending college and having doubts about running the Lunch Box. Ben tells Darlene that talking with the other guys has been helpful.
100	7	"Smash and Grab and Happy Death Day"	Michael Arden	Cindy Caponera	April 10, 2024	606	3.23
Becky is unable to afford nicer birthday gifts for Beverly Rose, so Dan hides the presents for a fun scavenger hunt. Rowdy teens commit a "smash and grab" robbery in Ben's hardware store; Dan and Jackie apprehend a girl thief, but police delay responding, considering it a minor property crime. During the scavenger hunt, Beverly Rose finds old photographs of deceased relatives. Darlene's age-inappropriate explanation about death frightens Beverly Rose, angering Becky. Darlene faults Becky for never honestly discussing death with her daughter. Becky admits that, having lost Mark, the topic is too painful and she fears breaking down in front of Beverly Rose. Jackie, sympathetic that the girl thief was coerced by a manipulative boy, lets her go. Dan is angry but Jackie says that growing up, she was always desperate for male approval. Becky, aided by Darlene, finally discusses death with Beverly Rose.
101	8	"Toilet Hacks and The Management Track"	Jody Margolin Hahn	Jana & Mitch Hunter	April 17, 2024	607	3.33
Dan starts collecting social security and his union pension to pay off his home mortgage sooner. Louise suggests Dan teach home repair classes but they become so popular that he grows exhausted teaching them and working full-time at the hardware store. When Darlene approaches the college nutritionist about improving the cafeteria food, she is promoted to manager. Darlene learns the promotion makes Mark ineligible for free tuition, but the nutritionist says it is too late to revert to her old job. Darlene wants to improve efficiency and garner cost-saving ideas, but most cafeteria workers are disinterested students with irregular hours. Jackie suggests Darlene use an outside food service to portion, prep, and deliver daily food supplies. Darlene hires Harris, who immediately becomes overwhelmed until Jackie helps out. Louise convinces an exhausted Dan to slow down so they have more time together.
102	9	"Manifesting, Marriage Testing and Cheeseballs"	Robbie Countryman	Emily Wilson	April 24, 2024	609	3.19
Becky and Jackie compete to diagnose why Harris is having difficulty completing work tasks. To keep up with household bills, Ben extends the hardware store's business hours, leaving less time for him and Darlene. When Ben makes time for them, Darlene is too tired for romance. Becky warns Darlene about neglecting her marriage when Ben spends more evenings at The Lobo. Darlene asks Dan to work additional hours at the hardware store so Ben can be home more, but Louise opposes him working more and always trying to fix his children's problems. As Jackie and Becky spar over Harris' emotional problems, she suffers a panic attack, resulting in a trip to Urgent Care. A mental health professional helps Harris understand her underlying emotional issues. Darlene revs up for a romantic evening with Ben, but he backs off. Louise agrees to Dan working a few longer shifts so Darlene and Ben have more time together.
103	10	"Campaign U-Turn and a Hard Write"	Robbie Countryman	Shelley Dennis	May 1, 2024	610	2.21
Jackie officially retires and hands the Lunch Box management to Harris. To spend more time with Jackie, Neville hires an assistant vet. "Hardware" magazine asks Dan to write an article about a small-town hardware store. When Ben doubts Dan's writing ability, Darlene wants him to help. Neville fires the new assistant vet, leaving him less time for Jackie. Jackie volunteers to help with Louise's school board campaign. Ben's offer to help with the article offends Dan. Louise ejects Jackie from the campaign after she oversteps boundaries. Neville advises Jackie to slow down and stop controlling everything. Jackie makes peace with Louise and promises to limit her activity. Ben, who misses writing professionally, writes his own article. Dan secretly submits it to the "Hardware" editor, who publishes it. Ben is then offered a monthly column.
104	11	"Fire and Vice"	Robbie Countryman	Lecy Goranson	May 8, 2024	611	2.23
Louise wins the school board race. Darlene and Jackie tease Ben about his Hardware magazine article, which Ben takes seriously. While interning at the counseling center, Becky becomes overly-involved helping patients, straining her relationship with Tyler and affecting her own mental health. Ben's hardware store is destroyed in a fire. Insurance covers the loss but Ben wants to use the insurance money to buy Hardware magazine. Darlene thinks the venture is too risky and it will leave Dan unemployed. Becky is offended when Jackie warns she is too emotionally involved helping others. After Mark points out how Ben has sacrificed his dreams to help the family, Darlene gives Ben her blessing to buy the magazine. Ben gives Dan, a part owner, 10% of the hardware store insurance money to pay off his home mortgage. Jackie persuades Becky to step back from the clinic and see a therapist.
105	12	"Flying, Applying and Rassling Gators"	Jody Margolin Hahn	Teleplay by : Hunter Rasmussen; Story by : Bruce Rasmussen	May 15, 2024	612	2.02
The family celebrates Dan paying off his mortgage. Becky secretly submits Mark's unsent University of Chicago online application. Mark is accepted as a transfer student but is dejected he cannot afford the $150,000 tuition. While Neville and Louise are visiting their mother, Dan and Jackie head to New Orleans for a weekend jazz festival. Just before their plane departs, Dan peacefully defuses an unruly passenger. The airline rewards Dan with flight vouchers, but the obnoxious passenger then harasses Dan and insults Jackie. An unseen altercation ensues, and Dan and Jackie are removed from the plane. They take a bus to New Orleans. The police bring home a drunk Mark, who is despondent over being unable to attend the UChicago. Darlene later gives Mark her blessing to quit S.A.D. University to work and save money for UChicago.
106	13	"Less Money, More Problems"	Jody Margolin Hahn	Teleplay by : Molly Kiernan & Daniel Spector; Story by : Cameron Griggs-Posey	May 22, 2024	613	2.15
After Mark leaves S.A.D. University, Darlene intends to quit the cafeteria job. Becky changes her counseling focus and is moving in with Tyler. Becky and Harris moving out will create a financial strain for Darlene and Ben. Ben finalizes buying Hardware magazine. To save for UChicago, Mark takes a car repo job but quits after the first assignment requires repossessing a needy young mother's vehicle. Dan and Jackie offer to help pay for UChicago, but Mark refuses, not wanting either to give up retirement. Dan, bored being at home, still wants a job. Mark is drawn into lucrative but illegal computer hacking but tells the family it is a legitimate job. Darlene is stressed coping with the many family changes. Becky wants her and Tyler to first live together at Ben and Darlene's house. Darlene agrees to co-sign for Harris's apartment.

=== Season 7 (2025) ===
No. overall	No. in season	Title	Directed by	Written by	Original release date	Prod. code	U.S. viewers (millions)
107	1	"It's Gonna Be A Great Day"	Jody Margolin Hahn	Emily Wilson & Mitch Hunter	March 26, 2025	701	3.24
After buying Hardware magazine, Ben spends all his time setting up the new office while neglecting Darlene. Meanwhile, Darlene receives a big promotion after her supervisor dies. Jackie learns the family can sue the pharmaceutical company for causing Roseanne's fatal overdose; Dan, still affected by her death, opposes the idea, claiming it is "blood money." Becky and Tyler reach a compromise after she finds his constant romantic gestures exhausting and he is stressed trying to impress her. Both Dan and Darlene separately consult Louise about their respective personal issues. Jackie considers reapplying to the Lanford Police Force. Jackie confronts Mark after discovering he is a computer hacker, but he refuses to quit.
108	2	"Fame, Flying Fists, and Cold Feet"	Jody Margolin Hahn	Cory Caplan	April 2, 2025	702	2.95
After the Restaurant 911 episode airs, the Lunch Box garners over a thousand Instagram followers. This inspires Becky to become a social media influencer and live streams from the restaurant. Dan introduces Jackie to Jean, an attorney who can represent her in the pharmaceutical lawsuit, though Dan still declines to participate. Jackie is ineligible to be the plaintiff and pressures Dan to take up the case, which Jean calls a "slam dunk" win. With Ben working 24/7 on Hardware magazine, Darlene spends time alone at the Lobo. There she meets Chad, an attractive, recently separated man. Becky's live stream receives derogatory viewer comments, causing her to quit. Jackie shows Dan one of Roseanne's old emails that shows she worried he would be physically and financially burdened if something happened to her. Dan agrees to pursue the case.
109	3	"Applications, Accusations and a Man-Bag"	Jody Margolin Hahn	Shelley Dennis	April 9, 2025	703	3.02
After Neville takes a second job as a zoo vet, Jackie announces she applied to the police department, though the family thinks it too dangerous and her too old. Dan asks Darlene and Becky to help fill out the lawsuit paperwork, causing Becky to speculate whether the family did enough to recognize and prevent Roseanne's pill addiction. Neville offers to quit the zoo if Jackie gives up becoming a cop, but she remains determined. Neville eventually realizes its importance to her and gives his approval. After discovering Mark is buying expensive designer brands, Darlene learns about his hacking job. She issues him an ultimatum to quit or leave the house, causing Mark to angrily storm out.
110	4	"Danny Boy, the Interview, the New Hire, and the Hanging Chad"	Jody Margolin Hahn	Molly Kiernan & Daniel Spector	April 16, 2025	704	2.84
Jackie warns Darlene that Mark will eventually be caught for computer hacking. While preparing Dan for his deposition, Jean is concerned about his inability to show emotion. While Ben works non-stop setting up the magazine, lonely Darlene spends nights at the Lobo with Chad. Ben introduces his journalism intern, Riley, to Harris, who finds him cute; she immediately hires him to work at the Lunch Box. Becky worries that she revealed too much personal information during an interview for a corporate counseling job. Jackie works out to prepare for the police physical. Chad brings his estranged wife to the Lobo to prove he is not meeting women there. When Darlene introduces herself as Chad's friend, his suspicious wife storms out, wanting a divorce. The bartender convinces Chad that Darlene is pursuing him. Harris fires Riley for bad job performance but wants to date him. Becky is hired to head the Mental Health Wellness Division at a tech company.
111	5	"Exercise Bands, Money Plans, and Faraway Lands"	Jody Margolin Hahn	Cory Caplan	April 23, 2025	705	3.35
Jackie, Darlene, and Harris prepare Dan for his deposition. Meanwhile, all the focus on Roseanne's death and how it affected Dan leaves Louise feeling marginalized. When Becky and Tyler agree to co-mingle their finances, Tyler wants them to save for a house; Becky, who now has a well-paying job, wants a new truck, saying it is for her to have something new for the first time in her life. Jackie gets Mark into a cybersecurity firm's training program with a guaranteed job. Darlene is elated until learning that Mark never intends to return to college and the job is in New York. Mark convinces Darlene it is the career path he truly wants and leaves for New York with her approval. Harris and Riley are now a couple.
112	6	"The Truck Stops Here"	Jody Margolin Hahn	Bruce Helford & Bruce Rasmussen	April 23, 2025	706	3.14
The corporate lawyers harshly grill Dan at the deposition, but he makes a convincing counter argument about the company's culpability. Darlene continues meeting Chad nightly at the Lobo until realizing the relationship has gone too far and ends it. After Becky confronts Ben about neglecting his marriage, he apologizes to Darlene and promises to be more attentive. Dan assures Louise that she is now the love of his life. The pharmaceutical company sends a settlement check without admitting any liability. Dan gathers the family at Roseanne's grave before opening the envelope to reveal the amount. The check is only for $700, causing everyone to laugh while reaffirming their commitment to the family. Each pays their respects to Roseanne, and Jackie announces that she was accepted to the Lanford Police Department. Dan orders pizza to be sent to the house. In the last scene, after the family disperses, Dan, sitting on the couch, bids the audience goodnight.

== Ratings ==
=== Season 1 ===
Viewership and ratings per episode of List of The Conners episodes
No.	Title	Air date	Rating (18–49)	Viewers (millions)	DVR (18–49)	DVR viewers (millions)	Total (18–49)	Total viewers (millions)
1	"Keep On Truckin'"	October 16, 2018	2.4/10	10.56	0.8	3.08	3.2	13.65
2	"Tangled Up in Blue"	October 23, 2018	1.7/7	8.00	0.8	2.64	2.5	10.65
3	"There Won't Be Blood"	October 30, 2018	1.8/8	7.83	0.7	2.43	2.5	10.26
4	"The Separation of Church and Dan"	November 13, 2018	1.5/7	6.94	0.8	2.66	2.3	9.60
5	"Miracles"	November 20, 2018	1.4/6	6.91	0.8	2.58	2.2	9.44
6	"One Flew Over the Conners' Nest"	November 27, 2018	1.4/6	7.32	0.8	2.32	2.2	9.64
7	"Hold the Salt"	December 4, 2018	1.3/6	6.63	0.8	2.51	2.1	9.14
8	"O Sister, Where Art Thou"	December 11, 2018	1.4/6	6.68	0.7	2.31	2.1	8.98
9	"Rage Against the Machine"	January 8, 2019	1.4/6	6.85	0.7	2.25	2.1	9.10
10	"Don't Shoot the Piano Teacher"	January 15, 2019	1.3/6	6.65	0.7	2.33	2.0	8.99
11	"We Continue to Truck"	January 22, 2019	1.5/7	7.74	0.7	2.32	2.2	10.06

=== Season 2 ===
Viewership and ratings per episode of List of The Conners episodes
No.	Title	Air date	Rating (18–49)	Viewers (millions)	DVR (18–49)	DVR viewers (millions)	Total (18–49)	Total viewers (millions)
1	"Preemies, Weed and Infidelity"	September 24, 2019	1.3/7	5.77	0.5	2.06	1.8	7.84
2	"A Kiss Is Just A Kiss"	October 1, 2019	1.2/6	5.58	0.5	2.02	1.7	7.60
3	"The Preemie Monologues"	October 8, 2019	1.2/6	5.69	0.5	2.05	1.7	7.75
4	"Lanford...Lanford"	October 15, 2019	1.1/6	5.50	0.5	2.13	1.6	7.63
5	"Nightmare on Lunch Box Street"	October 29, 2019	1.2/6	6.03	0.6	1.97	1.8	8.00
6	"Tempest in a Stew Pot"	November 12, 2019	1.0/5	5.48	0.6	2.05	1.6	7.55
7	"Slappy Holidays"	November 19, 2019	1.0/6	5.65	0.6	2.03	1.6	7.71
8	"Lanford, Toilet of Sin"	November 26, 2019	1.2/6	5.74	0.5	1.99	1.7	7.73
9	"Smoking Penguins and Santa on Santa Action"	December 10, 2019	1.1/5	5.72	0.5	1.84	1.5	7.56
10	"Throwing a Christian to a Bear"	January 21, 2020	1.0/5	5.40	0.5	2.03	1.5	7.43
11	"Mud Turtles, A Good Steak and One Man in a Tub"	January 28, 2020	0.9/5	5.31	0.6	1.99	1.5	7.30
12	"Live From Lanford"	February 11, 2020	1.1/6	6.21	0.5	1.60	1.6	7.85
13	"Brothers, Babies and Breakdowns"	February 18, 2020	1.1/6	5.51	0.5	1.86	1.6	7.38
14	"Bad Dads and Grads"	February 25, 2020	0.9/5	5.11	0.5	1.97	1.4	7.08
15	"Beards, Thrupples and Robots"	March 17, 2020	1.2/6	6.49	0.5	1.88	1.7	8.39
16	"Tats and Tias"	March 24, 2020	1.1/5	6.40	0.5	1.78	1.6	8.02
17	"The Icewoman Cometh"	April 7, 2020	1.0/5	6.18	0.6	1.88	1.6	8.01
18	"Pilot Lights & Sister Fights"	April 14, 2020	1.0/5	5.93	0.5	1.83	1.6	7.73
19	"CPAPs, Hickeys and Biscuits"	April 28, 2020	1.0/5	5.96	0.6	1.95	1.5	7.86
20	"Bridge Over Troubled Conners"	May 5, 2020	0.9/4	6.05	TBD	TBD	TBD	TBD

=== Season 3 ===
Viewership and ratings per episode of List of The Conners episodes
No.	Title	Air date	Rating (18–49)	Viewers (millions)	DVR (18–49)	DVR viewers (millions)	Total (18–49)	Total viewers (millions)
1	"Keep On Truckin' Six Feet Apart"	October 21, 2020	0.9	4.90	0.5	2.08	1.4	6.98
2	"Halloween and the Election vs. The Pandemic"	October 28, 2020	0.8	4.36	0.5	2.01	1.3	6.37
3	"Plastics, Trash Talk & Darlene Antoinette"	November 4, 2020	0.7	4.00	TBD	TBD	TBD	TBD
4	"Birthdays, Babies and Emotional Support Chickens"	November 18, 2020	0.6	3.65	0.6	2.16	1.2	5.81
5	"Friends in High Places and Horse Surgery"	November 25, 2020	0.7	3.66	TBD	TBD	TBD	TBD
6	"Protest, Drug Test and One Leaves the Nest"	December 2, 2020	0.6	3.58	0.6	2.26	1.2	5.84
7	"A Cold Mom, A Brother Daddy and a Prison Baby"	January 13, 2021	0.6	3.89	TBD	TBD	TBD	TBD
8	"Young Love, Old Lions and Middle-Aged Hyenas"	January 20, 2021	0.6	3.18	TBD	TBD	TBD	TBD
9	"Promotions, Podcasts and Magic Tea"	January 27, 2021	0.6	3.52	TBD	TBD	TBD	TBD
10	"Who Are Bosses, Boats and Eckhart Tolle?"	February 3, 2021	0.6	3.63	TBD	TBD	TBD	TBD
11	"Panic Attacks, Hardware Store and Big Mouth Billy Bass"	February 24, 2021	0.6	3.79	TBD	TBD	TBD	TBD
12	"A Stomach Ache, A Heartbreak and a Grave Mistake"	March 3, 2021	0.6	3.56	TBD	TBD	TBD	TBD
13	"Walden Pond, A Staycation and The Axis Powers"	March 24, 2021	0.6	3.45	TBD	TBD	TBD	TBD
14	"Money, Boozes and Lies"	March 31, 2021	0.5	3.26	TBD	TBD	TBD	TBD
15	"An Old Dog, New Tricks and a Ticket to Ride"	April 7, 2021	0.7	3.39	TBD	TBD	TBD	TBD
16	"A Fast Car, A Sudden Loss and a Slow Decline"	April 7, 2021	0.6	3.37	TBD	TBD	TBD	TBD
17	"Regrets, Rehabs and Realtors"	April 14, 2021	0.6	3.94	TBD	TBD	TBD	TBD
18	"Cheating, Revelations and A Box of Doll Heads"	April 21, 2021	0.5	2.98	TBD	TBD	TBD	TBD
19	"Jeopardé, Sobrieté and Infidelité"	May 12, 2021	0.6	3.58	0.4	1.86	1.0	5.44
20	"Two Proposals, a Homecoming and a Bear"	May 19, 2021	0.6	3.38	0.4	1.66	0.9	5.04

=== Season 4 ===
Viewership and ratings per episode of List of The Conners episodes
No.	Title	Air date	Rating (18–49)	Viewers (millions)	DVR (18–49)	DVR viewers (millions)	Total (18–49)	Total viewers (millions)
1	"Trucking Live in Front of a Fully Vaccinated Studio Audience"	September 22, 2021	0.7	3.51	TBD	TBD	TBD	TBD
2	"Education, Corruption, Damnation"	September 29, 2021	0.5	3.47	TBD	TBD	TBD	TBD
3	"Sober Sex, Plastic Silverware and Losing My Religion"	October 6, 2021	0.5	3.15	TBD	TBD	TBD	TBD
4	"The Wedding of Dan and Louise"	October 13, 2021	0.6	3.59	0.3	1.48	0.9	5.07
5	"Peter Pan, The Backup Plan, Adventures in Babysitting and A River Runs Through It"	October 27, 2021	0.5	3.33	TBD	TBD	TBD	TBD
6	"Young Love, Old Love and Take This Job and Shove It"	November 3, 2021	0.5	3.09	TBD	TBD	TBD	TBD
7	"Let's All Push Our Hands Together for the Stew Train and The Conners Furniture"	November 17, 2021	0.5	3.47	0.3	1.59	0.8	5.06
8	"Yard Sale, Phone Fail, And a College Betrayal"	December 1, 2021	0.5	3.31	0.3	1.43	0.8	4.74
9	"Three Exes, Role Playing and A Waterbed"	January 5, 2022	0.5	2.92	TBD	TBD	TBD	TBD
10	"Spills, Pills and The Midnight Lasagna"	January 12, 2022	0.6	3.27	TBD	TBD	TBD	TBD
11	"Patriarchs and Goddesses"	January 19, 2022	0.5	3.01	TBD	TBD	TBD	TBD
12	"Hot for Teacher and Writing a Wrong"	February 2, 2022	0.6	3.26	TBD	TBD	TBD	TBD
13	"Sex, Lies and House Hunting"	February 23, 2022	0.5	3.01	TBD	TBD	TBD	TBD
14	"Triggered"	March 2, 2022	0.5	3.27	TBD	TBD	TBD	TBD
15	"Messy Situation, Miscommunication and Academic Probation"	March 16, 2022	0.5	2.93	TBD	TBD	TBD	TBD
16	"Gas Pump, House Dump and Stew Volcano"	March 23, 2022	0.5	3.02	TBD	TBD	TBD	TBD
17	"Big Negotiations and Broken Expectations"	April 13, 2022	0.4	2.77	TBD	TBD	TBD	TBD
18	"The Best Laid Plans, A Contrabassoon and A Sinking Feeling"	May 4, 2022	0.4	3.04	TBD	TBD	TBD	TBD
19	"Three Ring Circus"	May 11, 2022	0.4	2.74	TBD	TBD	TBD	TBD
20	"A Judge and A Priest Walk Into A Living Room..."	May 18, 2022	0.4	2.92	TBD	TBD	TBD	TBD

=== Season 5 ===
Viewership and ratings per episode of List of The Conners episodes
No.	Title	Air date	Rating (18–49)	Viewers (millions)	DVR (18–49)	DVR viewers (millions)	Total (18–49)	Total viewers (millions)
1	"Double Honeymoon and Seeing Double"	September 21, 2022	0.5	3.73	0.2	1.29	0.7	5.02
2	"Scenes From Two Marriages: The Parrot Doth Protest Too Much"	September 28, 2022	0.5	3.47	0.2	1.19	0.7	4.66
3	"Driving, Dating and Deceit"	October 5, 2022	0.5	3.61	0.2	1.18	0.7	4.79
4	"Parent Traps and Heart Attacks"	October 12, 2022	0.5	3.63	0.2	1.13	0.7	4.76
5	"A Little Weed and a Bad Seed"	October 19, 2022	0.5	3.62	0.3	1.23	0.8	4.84
6	"Book Bans and Guillotine Hands"	October 26, 2022	0.6	3.93	0.2	1.12	0.8	5.05
7	"Take This Job and Shove It Twice"	November 2, 2022	0.5	3.72	0.2	1.23	0.7	4.94
8	"Of Missing Minds and Missing Fries"	November 16, 2022	0.6	3.96	0.2	1.24	0.8	5.20
9	"Crumbs and Couch Surfers"	November 30, 2022	0.6	4.19	TBD	TBD	TBD	TBD
10	"The Dog Days of Christmas"	December 7, 2022	0.5	3.82	TBD	TBD	TBD	TBD
11	"Two More Years and a Stolen Rose"	January 11, 2023	0.6	4.15	0.2	1.30	0.8	5.45
12	"Stuck in the Middle and Stuck in the Past"	January 18, 2023	0.5	4.19	0.2	1.20	0.7	5.39
13	"New Pipes and Old Secrets"	February 8, 2023	0.6	4.21	TBD	TBD	TBD	TBD
14	"Adding Insult to Injury"	February 15, 2023	0.5	3.57	TBD	TBD	TBD	TBD
15	"Possums, Pregnancy and Patriarchy"	February 22, 2023	0.5	3.75	TBD	TBD	TBD	TBD
16	"Hiding In and Moving Out"	March 1, 2023	0.4	3.44	TBD	TBD	TBD	TBD
17	"The Contra Hearings and The Midnight Gambler"	March 8, 2023	0.4	3.74	TBD	TBD	TBD	TBD
18	"Road Trip and Guilt Trip"	March 15, 2023	0.5	3.87	TBD	TBD	TBD	TBD
19	"Text Thread and The Marital Bed"	April 5, 2023	0.5	3.64	TBD	TBD	TBD	TBD
20	"What's So Funny About Peas, Love and Understanding?"	April 19, 2023	0.5	3.66	TBD	TBD	TBD	TBD
21	"Dating, Drinking and Grifter Logic"	April 26, 2023	0.5	3.24	TBD	TBD	TBD	TBD
22	"The Grad Finale"	May 3, 2023	0.5	3.65	TBD	TBD	TBD	TBD

=== Season 6 ===
Viewership and ratings per episode of List of The Conners episodes
No.	Title	Air date	Rating (18–49)	Viewers (millions)
1	"The Publisher Cops Show Pilot"	February 7, 2024	0.5	3.59
2	"Valentine's Day Treats and Credit Card Cheats"	February 14, 2024	0.5	3.38
3	"Moms and Rats"	February 21, 2024	0.4	3.47
4	"Shrinks Don't Talk and Kids Don't Sing"	February 28, 2024	0.4	3.36
5	"When Sisters Collide and The Return of the Grifters"	March 13, 2024	0.4	3.40
6	"Hanging in Dorms with Boys and The Secret Life of Men"	March 20, 2024	0.4	3.32
7	"Smash and Grab and Happy Death Day"	April 10, 2024	0.3	3.23
8	"Toilet Hacks and The Management Track"	April 17, 2024	0.4	3.33
9	"Manifesting, Marriage Testing and Cheeseballs"	April 24, 2024	0.3	3.19
10	"Campaign U-Turn and a Hard Write"	May 1, 2024	0.3	2.21
11	"Fire and Vice"	May 8, 2024	0.3	2.23
12	"Flying, Applying and Rassling Gators"	May 15, 2024	0.2	2.02
13	"Less Money, More Problems"	May 22, 2024	0.3	2.15

=== Season 7 ===
Viewership and ratings per episode of List of The Conners episodes
No.	Title	Air date	Rating (18–49)	Viewers (millions)	DVR (18–49)	DVR viewers (millions)	Total (18–49)	Total viewers (millions)	Ref.
1	"It's Gonna Be A Great Day"	March 26, 2025	0.3	3.24	0.1	1.08	0.5	4.32	
2	"Fame, Flying Fists, and Cold Feet"	April 2, 2025	0.3	2.95	TBD	TBD	TBD	TBD	
3	"Applications, Accusations and a Man-Bag"	April 9, 2025	0.3	3.02	TBD	TBD	TBD	TBD	
4	"Danny Boy, the Interview, the New Hire, and the Hanging Chad"	April 16, 2025	0.3	2.84	TBD	TBD	TBD	TBD	
5	"Exercise Bands, Money Plans, and Faraway Lands"	April 23, 2025	0.4	3.35	TBD	TBD	TBD	TBD	
6	"The Truck Stops Here"	April 23, 2025	0.3	3.14	TBD	TBD	TBD	TBD	

=== Seasons 1–4 ===
The Conners : U.S. viewers per episode (millions)

Season	Episode number																			
Season	1	2	3	4	5	6	7	8	9	10	11	12	13	14	15	16	17	18	19	20
1	10.56	8.00	7.83	6.94	6.86	7.32	6.63	6.68	6.85	6.65	7.74	–								
2	5.77	5.58	5.69	5.50	6.03	5.48	5.68	5.74	5.72	5.40	5.31	6.21	5.51	5.11	6.49	6.40	6.18	5.94	5.96	6.05
3	4.90	4.36	4.00	3.65	3.85	3.58	3.89	3.18	3.52	3.63	3.79	3.56	3.45	3.26	3.39	3.37	3.94	2.98	3.58	3.38
4	3.51	3.47	3.15	3.59	3.33	3.09	3.47	3.31	2.92	3.27	3.01	3.26	3.01	3.27	2.93	3.02	2.77	3.04	2.74	2.92

Audience measurement performed by Nielsen Media Research

=== Seasons 5–7 ===
The Conners : U.S. viewers per episode (millions)

Season	Episode number																					
Season	1	2	3	4	5	6	7	8	9	10	11	12	13	14	15	16	17	18	19	20	21	22
5	3.73	3.47	3.61	3.63	3.62	3.93	3.72	3.96	4.19	3.82	4.15	4.19	4.21	3.57	3.75	3.44	3.74	3.87	3.64	3.66	3.24	3.65
6	3.59	3.38	3.47	3.36	3.41	3.32	3.23	3.33	3.19	2.21	2.23	2.02	2.15	–								
7	3.24	2.95	3.02	2.84	3.35	3.14	–															

Audience measurement performed by Nielsen Media Research
