= Live from Lanford =

- The Conners episode
- Episode no.: Season 2 Episode 12
- Directed by: Jody Margolin Hahn
- Written by: Bruce Helford; Bruce Rasmussen; Dave Caplan
- Production code: 218
- Original air date: February 11, 2020

Guest appearances
- Katey Sagal as Louise; Jay R. Ferguson as Ben; Stephen Monroe Taylor as Dwight

Episode chronology
← Previous "Mud Turtles, A Good Steak and One Man in a Tub"	Next → "Brothers, Babies and Breakdowns"

"Live from Lanford" is the twelfth episode of second season of the American sitcom television series The Conners, and the 23rd episode overall. It first aired live on February 11, 2020 on ABC, the night of the 2020 New Hampshire Democratic primary. The episode was performed twice; once for each coast.

The episode was written by Bruce Helford, Bruce Rasmussen, and Dave Caplan, and was directed by Jody Margolin Hahn. It was the series' first episode to be broadcast live.

== Plot ==
Mark and Harris watch the live coverage of the 2020 New Hampshire Democratic primary for Mark's school assignment, prompting the rest of the family to chime in with their own political opinions and stress the importance of voting. Mark resents assumptions that he supports Pete Buttigieg because he is gay. The family throws an impromptu going-away party for Louise, believing it will compel Dan to ask her to stay. Their plan backfires, forcing Dan to admit that he and Louise have broken up. Dan consults a priest about his inability to move past Roseanne's death, then determines he will when he is ready. Mark's anger over Harris leaving home comes out, leading her to take time to discuss his and Austin's renewed, though troubled, relationship.

== Production ==
The episode was first announced at the TCA Winter Press Tour on January 8, 2020. The episode also incorporated updates from the 2020 New Hampshire Democratic primary into the story live as they happened, including naming Bernie Sanders as the winner of the primary. Due to the fact that the Conner family television is located on the wall not shown on camera, and because the television was an important part of the plot of the episode, it was moved temporally to a new location in the family's living room. To practice for the episode, the cast did a live commercial during the 92nd Academy Awards, on February 9, 2020. The script for the episode was shorter than normal, to allow for enough time to add in updates on the primary. To help eliminate the chance of a power outage, the crew brought in generators.

== Reception ==
=== Viewing figures ===
In the United States, the episode was watched live by 6.21 million viewers. Within seven days, the episode was watched by a total of 7.85 million viewers.

=== Critical response ===
Robyn Bahr of The Hollywood Reporter wrote: "The episode couldn't have gone more smoothly, which is a feat for the production but actually somewhat of a letdown for the shark-like audience, constantly on the hunt for that little taste of blood... Overall, the cast and crew pulled off a flawless execution, which I attest to Helford's veteran producing skills and the trust between the castmembers, many of whom have been working together for more than 30 years. Goranson, in particular, is the MVP of the episode, delivering zinger after zinger with her signature serrated verve and impeccable timing. The next time The Conners attempts this format, I hope they inject a little more acid into the proceedings. In the words of Becky Conner, 'Take a hint and move on!'"
