= Debmar-Mercury =

US television syndication company

Debmar Mercury, LLC
- Type: Subsidiary
- Industry: Television syndication
- Predecessors: Debmar Studios; Mercury Entertainment
- Founded: 2005; 21 years ago
- Founder: Mort Marcus; Ira Bernstein
- Headquarters: 2700 Colorado Avenue, Santa Monica, California, United States
- Area served: Worldwide
- Parent: Lionsgate Television (2006–present)
- Website: debmarmercury.com

Debmar-Mercury, LLC is a television syndication company. A wholly-owned subsidiary of Lionsgate Television, it was formed from a merger of Debmar Studios and Mercury Entertainment in 2005.

== History ==
=== Debmar Studios ===
Debmar-Mercury's history begins on October 31, 1993, when Mort Marcus founded Debmar Studios (named for his wife, Debbie's, first name & his own last name), with financial backing from The Walt Disney Company (where he had worked as senior vice president of sales at its Buena Vista Television syndication arm). Debmar signed a deal with CBS to distribute a handful of films and specials, such as My Fair Lady, Gunsmoke telefilms, the first two feature length Peanuts films (A Boy Named Charlie Brown and Snoopy Come Home) and some Dr. Seuss/DFE animated specials.

The company also planned to distribute a court show called I Accuse (produced by Mark Goodson Productions and co-distributed by Viacom Enterprises), which never materialized. As well as distributing syndicated reruns of Supermarket Sweep, which Debmar acquired distribution rights to from Al Howard Productions, the series was distributed to stations by ITC Entertainment.

The first iteration was folded into Buena Vista Television on August 15, 1994 after Marcus became president of its syndication arm.

The company was revived in 2002 after Marcus left Miramax Television, with its first rights picked up being that of the animated sitcom South Park for off-net syndication, in association with Mercury Entertainment. Tribune Entertainment was then attached as South Park's advertising sales agent in 2004. This was followed by the syndicated launch of Farscape, in association with Mercury Entertainment in 2004.

=== Mercury Entertainment ===
Mercury Entertainment was formed in 1999 by Ira Bernstein after his employer Rysher Entertainment sold its distribution operations to Paramount Domestic Television. The company handled advertising sales of the television show Tracker. In 2000, the company struck a deal with Paramount to co-distribute the series Queen of Swords. In 2001, Bernstein joined Lionsgate Television, temporarily folding Mercury into the company. After Bernstein left Lions Gate, the company was reestablished to partner with Debmar Studios to handle sales of its programming, such as South Park and Farscape.

=== Debmar-Mercury ===
In 2005, the two companies were merged into the new studio Debmar-Mercury. The company started its relationship with Lions Gate Entertainment, obtaining the syndication rights to its movie library, followed by the distribution rights to the television show The Dead Zone.

On July 12, 2006, Lions Gate Entertainment acquired Debmar-Mercury as part of its expansion into television distribution. In November 2006, the company was awarded the syndication rights to Family Feud starting in the 2007–2008 season, and industry rumors suggested that the company could also syndicate some classic Goodson-Todman shows. On January 11, 2007, 20th Television picked up ad-sales for select Debmar-Mercury series in syndication.

In April 2019, Debmar-Mercury moved its advertising sales deal from Disney's 20th Television to the CBS Corporation's CBS Television Distribution Media Sales.

== "10–90" model ==
Debmar-Mercury was known in the past for pioneering a unique syndication model known as the "10-90" approach, where the syndicator sells the program to a cable network for a 10-episode test run. If those 10 episodes achieve acceptable ratings, the show would be renewed for an additional 90 episodes. This allows the show to have a profitable life in off-network syndication, in which achieving 100 episodes is considered the desired number for a show to begin entering daily reruns. This unique broadcast syndication model for television was used with the TBS and OWN cable television networks for multiple sitcoms created by the multihyphenate Tyler Perry, and for multiple series with the FX cable television network, featuring the likes of actors Charlie Sheen (Anger Management), Kelsey Grammer and Martin Lawrence (Partners), and George Lopez (Saint George).

The model eventually broke down, with Saint George and Partners failing to reach the threshold for a 90-episode renewal (along with Comedy Central's 2010 series Big Lake, a co-production with Lionsgate and Funny or Die), and Anger Management quietly being de-emphasized by FX after middling scripts that went against that network's 'premium' image and accompanying low ratings, and actress Selma Blair accusing Lionsgate of maintaining a hostile workplace and departing the series. The series also performed poorly in its later run in broadcast syndication. The rise of streaming video providers such as Netflix, Hulu and Amazon Prime Video and their minimum quality standards also made the 10/90 model untenable in the long run. Tyler Perry also departed Lionsgate in 2011 for more creative freedom on his own in other arrangements with OWN and BET.

== List of series ==
=== In-house shows ===
Title	Years	Network	Notes
Tyler Perry's House of Payne	2006–2012	TBS	co-production with Tyler Perry Studios
The Wendy Williams Show	2008–2022	Syndication	co-produced with Perler Productions and Just Wendy
Trivial Pursuit: America Plays	2008–2009	Syndication	co-production with Hasbro and Wheeler/Sussman Productions
Tyler Perry's Meet the Browns	2009–2011	TBS	co-production with Tyler Perry Studios; Co-distributed with Warner Bros. Television Distribution (via Turner Broadcasting System)
Big Lake	2010	Comedy Central	co-production with Gary Sanchez Productions and Motron Productions
Are We There Yet?	2010–2013	TBS	co-production with Revolution Studios, 5914 Entertainment and Cube Vision
The Jeremy Kyle Show	2011–2013	Syndication	co-produced with and distributed outside of the United States by ITV Studios
Anger Management	2012–2014	FX	co-production with Mohawk Productions, Revolution Studios, Estevez/Sheen Productions, and Twisted Television
Saint George	2014	FX	co-production with Wind Dancer Films, Travieso Productions, and 3 Arts Entertainment
Partners	2014	FX	co-produced with the production companies of Robert L. Boyett, Robert Horn, Kelsey Grammer, and Martin Lawrence
T.D. Jakes	2015-2017	Tegna	co-production with 44 Blue Productions, TDJ Enterprises, and EnLight Productions; syndication handed to Flow Media Partners in 2016
Caught in Providence	2018–2020	Syndication	
Ambitions	2019	OWN	co-production with Will Packer Media and Harpo Films
Jerry O'	2019	Syndication	co-production with Funny or Die and 3 Arts Entertainment
Nick Cannon	2021–2022	Syndication	co-produced with NCredible Entertainment
Sherri	2022–2026	Syndication	

=== Third party distribution ===
Title	Years	Network	Notes
Really Wild Animals	1994–1997	Direct-to-video	produced by National Geographic Society
E! True Hollywood Story	1996–2021	E!	produced by Comcast Entertainment Studios
South Park	1997–present	Comedy Central	produced by Comedy Partners and South Park Studios; Syndicated by Debmar-Mercury from 2005 to 2015
Farscape	1999–2003	Sci-Fi Channel	American syndication rights produced by Hallmark Entertainment and The Jim Henson Company
Family Feud	1999–present	Syndication	produced by Fremantle North America previously distributed by Pearson Television from 1999 to 2001 and Tribune Entertainment from 2001 to 2007
RoboCop: Prime Directives	2001	Space	produced by Rigel Entertainment and Fireworks Entertainment in association with CHUM Television
The Dead Zone	2002–2007	USA Network	produced by The Segan Company and Piller² in association with Lionsgate and Paramount
American Chopper	2003–2010	Discovery Channel; TLC	produced by Pilgrim Films & Television; distributed under license by Discovery Communications for syndication
Animal Atlas	2004–2015	Syndication	produced by Midori Entertainment and Bellum Entertainment Group
Safari Tracks	2005	Syndication	produced by Bellum Entertainment Group
Deadliest Catch	2005–present	Discovery Channel	produced by Original Productions; distributed under license by Discovery Communications for syndication
Tosh.0	2009–2020	Comedy Central	produced by Black Heart Productions and Comedy Partners
The Fran Drescher Show	2010	Syndication	produced by Uh Oh Productions and Scott Sternberg Productions
Celebrity Name Game	2014–2017	Syndication	produced by Fremantle North America, Entertain the Brutes, Green Mountain West, Coquette Productions and CBS Television Studios
BoJack Horseman	2014–2020	Netflix	produced by Tornante Television, Boxer vs. Raptor and ShadowMachine
Schitt's Creek	2015–2020	CBC	produced by Not a Real Company Productions; American distribution under license from ITV Studios
iWitness	2017	FOX	produced by Entertain the Brutes, Queen Bee Productions and Fremantle North America
The Conners	2018–2025	ABC	Worldwide distribution rights produced by Werner Entertainment, Jax Media and Mohawk Productions

== List of movies ==
A deal was reached with Revolution Studios to distribute their movies to syndication, which took effect on January 5, 2005. Most other films were originally distributed by Lionsgate.

Title	U.S. Release	Distributor	Producers
The Arrival	5/31/1996	Orion Pictures	Live Entertainment, Interscope Communications, PolyGram Filmed Entertainment, Steelework Films
Held Up	5/12/2000	Trimark Pictures	Minds Eye Entertainment, Original Film
The Animal	6/1/2001	Sony Pictures Releasing	Columbia Pictures, Revolution Studios, Happy Madison Productions
Black Hawk Down	1/18/2002	Sony Pictures Releasing	Columbia Pictures, Revolution Studios, Jerry Bruckheimer Films, Scott Free Productions
WiseGirls	10/19/2002	Lions Gate Entertainment	Leading Pictures, Intermedia Films, Monarc Films
Daddy Day Care	5/9/2003	Sony Pictures Releasing	Columbia Pictures, Revolution Studios, Davis Entertainment
The Missing	11/26/2003	Sony Pictures Releasing	Columbia Pictures, Revolution Studios, Imagine Entertainment
Peter Pan	12/25/2003	Universal Pictures	Universal Pictures, Columbia Pictures, Revolution Studios, Red Wagon Entertainment, Allied Stars Ltd.
Hellboy	4/2/2004	Columbia Pictures (through Sony Pictures Releasing)	Lawrence Gordon/Lloyd Levin Productions, Dark Horse Entertainment
The Punisher	4/16/2004	Lions Gate Films	Marvel Enterprises, Valhalla Motion Pictures, Artisan Entertainment
13 Going on 30	4/23/2004	Sony Pictures Releasing	Columbia Pictures, Revolution Studios, Roth/Arnold Productions, Gina Matthews Productions
Godsend	4/30/2004	Lions Gate Films	2929 Entertainment, Atmosphere Pictures
Christmas with the Kranks	11/24/2004	Sony Pictures Releasing	Columbia Pictures, Revolution Studios, 1492 Pictures
XXX: State of the Union	4/29/2005	Sony Pictures Releasing	Columbia Pictures, Revolution Studios, Original Film
Rent	11/23/2005	Sony Pictures Releasing	Columbia Pictures, Revolution Studios, 1492 Pictures, Tribeca Productions
The Benchwarmers	4/7/2006	Sony Pictures Releasing	Columbia Pictures, Revolution Studios, Happy Madison Productions
Little Man	7/14/2006	Columbia Pictures (through Sony Pictures Releasing)	Revolution Studios, Wayans Bros. Entertainment
Rocky Balboa	12/20/2006	MGM Distribution Co.	Metro-Goldwyn-Mayer Pictures, Columbia Pictures, Revolution Studios, Chartoff Productions, Winkler Films
Slow Burn	4/13/2007	Lionsgate	DEJ Productions, GreeneStreet Films
Perfect Stranger	4/13/2007	Sony Pictures Releasing	Columbia Pictures, Revolution Studios
Next	4/27/2007	Paramount Pictures	Revolution Studios, Initial Entertainment Group, Virtual Studios, Saturn Films
The Brothers Solomon	9/7/2007	Screen Gems	TriStar Pictures, Revolution Studios, Carsey-Werner Productions
The Water Horse: Legend of the Deep	12/25/2007	Columbia Pictures (through Sony Pictures Releasing)	Revolution Studios, Walden Media, Ecosse Films, Beacon Pictures

== See also ==
- Lionsgate Television
