= Robert Horne =

Robert Horne may refer to:

== Politicians ==
- Bob Horne (born 1939), Australian politician
- Robert Horne (MP), son of MP Henry Horne
- Robert Horne, 1st Viscount Horne of Slamannan (1871–1940), British politician

== Sports ==
- Robert Horne (cricketer), Olympic cricketer
- Robert Horne (wrestler) (born 1964), American wrestler
- Rob Horne (born 1989), Australian rugby union player
- Robert Van Horne (American football), American football coach

== Others ==
- Robert Horne (bishop) (c. 1510s-1579), bishop of Winchester
- Robert Van Horne (born 1948), American pianist and composer
- Rob Horne (professor), professor of behavioural medicine
- Robert Horne (virologist) (1923–2010), virologist and microscopy expert

== See also ==
- Robert Horn (disambiguation)
