= The Conners =

American television sitcom (2018–2025)

- Genre: Sitcom
- Created by: Matt Williams
- Based on: Roseanne by Matt Williams
- Developed by: Bruce Helford; Bruce Rasmussen; Dave Caplan
- Showrunners: Bruce Helford; Bruce Rasmussen; Dave Caplan
- Starring: John Goodman; Laurie Metcalf; Sara Gilbert; Lecy Goranson; Michael Fishman; Emma Kenney; Ames McNamara; Jayden Rey; Maya Lynne Robinson; Jay R. Ferguson
- Theme music composer: Antonio Beliveau
- Composer: Antonio Beliveau
- Country of origin: United States
- Original language: English
- No. of seasons: 7
- No. of episodes: 112 (list of episodes)

Production
- Executive producers: Tom Werner; Tony Hernandez; Sara Gilbert; Dave Caplan; Bruce Rasmussen; Bruce Helford
- Cinematography: Donald A. Morgan; John Simmons
- Editor: Brian Schnuckel
- Camera setup: Multi-camera
- Running time: 22 minutes
- Production companies: Mohawk Productions; Jax Media; Gilbert TV; Werner Entertainment (Season 1 along with Gilbert TV); Sara + Tom (Seasons 2-7)

Original release
- Network: ABC
- Release: October 16, 2018 – April 23, 2025

Related
- Roseanne

The Conners is an American television sitcom created by Matt Williams and developed by Bruce Helford, Bruce Rasmussen, and Dave Caplan for ABC as a direct continuation of the series Roseanne. The series is produced by Werner Entertainment, with Helford, Rasmussen, Caplan, Tom Werner, Tony Hernandez, and co-star Sara Gilbert serving as executive producers, and features John Goodman, Laurie Metcalf, Gilbert, Lecy Goranson, Michael Fishman, Emma Kenney, Ames McNamara, Jayden Rey, Maya Lynne Robinson, and Jay R. Ferguson.

A planned renewal for Roseanne's eleventh season was cancelled in May 2018, due to controversial tweets by its star Roseanne Barr on Twitter. The next month, ABC ordered a spin-off and confirmed the adult principal cast's involvement, while Kenney, McNamara and Rey were confirmed in August.

The series premiered on October 16, 2018, airing in the Tuesday 8:00 p.m. slot its predecessor was scheduled to hold during the 2018–19 television season. ABC ordered an extra episode on October 26, 2018, bringing the episode number to eleven.

On March 22, 2019, the series was renewed for a second season of 13 episodes. ABC ordered six extra episodes on May 14, 2019, expanding the number to 19. An additional episode was then ordered, with season 2 totaling 20 episodes. The second season premiered on September 24, 2019. ABC renewed the series for a third season on May 21, 2020, and it was announced that season 3 would move from Tuesday to Wednesday, which premiered on October 21, 2020. The series was renewed for a fourth season on May 14, 2021, which premiered on September 22, 2021.

On May 13, 2022, the series was renewed for a fifth season, which premiered on September 21, 2022. ABC expanded the series' fifth season on October 12, 2022, to feature its largest season to date, ordering 22 episodes for the 2022–23 television season, which concluded on May 3, 2023. The series was renewed for a sixth season on May 16, 2023, which premiered on February 7, 2024. On May 10, 2024, the series was renewed for a seventh and final season consisting of six episodes, which premiered on March 26, 2025. The series concluded with the final episode airing on April 23, 2025.

== Premise ==
The show follows the Conners, a working-class family struggling to get by on modest household incomes. After the death of the original show's lead character, Roseanne, they continue to face the daily struggles of life in the fictional mid-state exurb of Lanford, Illinois.

While the show follows on from the series Roseanne, producer Bruce Helford has explained that the creative staff have chosen to deliberately ignore certain developments from the sixth season of Roseanne onwards. This includes Jackie's marriage to Fred and the birth of her son Andy; the birth of Roseanne and Dan's fourth child, Jerry; and nearly all of Roseanne's ninth season.

== Cast and characters ==
=== Main ===
- John Goodman as Dan Conner, Roseanne's widower
- Laurie Metcalf as Jackie Harris-Goldufski, Dan's sister-in-law
- Sara Gilbert as Darlene Conner-Olinsky, Dan's second daughter
- Lecy Goranson as Becky Conner-Healy, Dan's first daughter
- Michael Fishman as D.J. Conner (seasons 1–4), Dan's son
- Emma Kenney as Harris Conner-Healy, Darlene & David's daughter
- Ames McNamara as Mark Conner-Healy, Darlene & David's son
- Jayden Rey as Mary Conner (seasons 1–5), D.J. & Geena's daughter
- Maya Lynne Robinson as Geena Williams-Conner (season 1; guest season 3), D.J.'s wife
- Jay R. Ferguson as Ben Olinsky (seasons 3–7; recurring season 1 & 2), Darlene's former boss and, as of the end of season four, her husband

=== Recurring ===
- Katey Sagal as Louise Conner (née Goldufski), a former high school classmate of Roseanne, Dan and Jackie. She is Becky's co-worker who plays music on the side, and is eventually Dan's second wife.
- James Pickens Jr. as Chuck Mitchell (seasons 1–4), Dan's best friend
- Rene Rosado as Emilio Rodriguez (seasons 1–5), the father of Becky's daughter Beverly Rose
- Estelle Parsons as Beverly Harris (seasons 1–3, 5–6), Jackie and Roseanne's mother
- Johnny Galecki as David Healy (seasons 1 & 2), Darlene's ex-husband
- Natalie West as Crystal Anderson (seasons 1 & 6), a longtime family friend who married Dan's father, Ed, Sr. and is mother of Dan's two half siblings, Ed Jr. and Angela, and his stepbrother, Lonnie
- Matthew Broderick as Peter (season 1), Jackie's freeloader boyfriend
- Eliza Bennett as Odessa (season 2), Harris' friend whom she temporarily moves in with
- Noel Fisher as Ed Conner Jr. (season 2), Dan's half brother
- Alexandra Billings as Robin (seasons 3–5), a supervisor at Wellman Plastics and Darlene's mentor
- Nat Faxon as Neville Goldufski (season 3–7), Louise's younger brother who is a veterinarian and who later becomes Jackie's second husband
- Evelina Fernandez as Juanita (season 3), a co-worker of Darlene and Becky's at Wellman's who worked with Roseanne and Jackie
  - Fernandez had previously recurred as Juanita in the first season of Roseanne
- Brian Austin Green as Jeff (seasons 3 & 4), a co-worker of Darlene's at Wellman's
- Andrew Leeds as Nick (season 4), Darlene's boyfriend
- Matt Walsh as Glen (season 4), Becky's professor and boyfriend
- Christopher Lloyd as Lou (season 4), Bev's retirement home boyfriend and later Mark's contrabassoon teacher
- Sean Astin as Tyler (season 5–7), Becky's boyfriend.
- Charlotte Sanchez as Beverly Rose (season 4, Ep 9.–7), Becky's daughter with Emilio Rodriguez.

=== Guests ===
- Mary Steenburgen as Marcy Bellinger, a neighbor from whom Roseanne obtained prescription pills
- Juliette Lewis as Blue, David Healy's new girlfriend Lewis and Galecki previously played siblings in National Lampoon's Christmas Vacation.
- Justin Long as Neil, Darlene's brief love interest. She later breaks up with him when she realizes she is attracted to Ben.
- Sarah Chalke as Andrea, the woman for whom Becky was planning to be a surrogate in the tenth season of Roseanne
  - Chalke had portrayed Becky Conner in seasons 6 & 7 (after Lecy Goranson left the show to attend college), three episodes of 8 (when Lecy Goranson came back but was unavailable) and all of nine (when Lecy Goranson left again)
- Peter Gallagher as Brian Foster, lawyer for Dan in episode "Rage Against the Machine"
- Lucy Punch as Kyle's mom
- Patrick Fabian as James
- Dan Aykroyd as one of Dan's poker buddies in "The Preemie Monologues"
  - Aykroyd had co-starred with John Goodman in the 1998 film Blues Brothers 2000
- Paul Reubens as Sandy Bitensky, a local newspaper reporter
- Cheryl Hines as Dawn, a food vendor for the Lunch Box whom Jackie befriends
- Clark Gregg and Jennifer Grey as Ron and Janelle, a married couple who befriend Jackie and want her to engage in a "throuple" relationship with them
- Ozzy Osbourne and Sharon Osbourne as themselves
- Paul Hipp as Zack, keyboard player and Louise's brief love interest
- Joel Murray as Jim, Dan's longtime contact at the local bank
- Danny Trejo as Tito, a neighbor of the Conners suffering from expensive health bills
- Candice Bergen as Barb Olinsky, Ben's aloof mother, who reveals Ben's late dad was not his biological father
- Sarah Baker as Helen
- Milo Manheim as Josh, Harris' activist boyfriend
- Steve Agee as Tony
- Patton Oswalt as Don Blansky, the manager of the local cemetery
- Fred Savage as Dr. Harding
- Danielle Harris as Molly Tilden
  - Harris had previously recurred as Molly Tilden during the fifth season of Roseanne
- Aaron Rodgers as himself, appearing as a guest host on Jeopardy!
- Jason Alexander as Pastor Phil
- Darien Sills-Evans as Mike
- Tony Cavalero as Aldo, Harris' surprise wedding date
- Andrea Anders as Helen
- Joe Walsh as Jesse, Aldo's father
- Ethan Cutkosky as Caleb
- Ever Carradine as Pamela Finch
- Barry Livingston as Mr. Nelson
- Jane Curtin as Doris Goldufski
- William H. Macy as Smitty
- Eric Allan Kramer as Bobo
- Jack McBrayer as Jack Fudderman
- Jaime Pressly as Tire Shop Manager
- Whoopi Goldberg as Ms. Glen
- Nick Offerman as Adam Chestnut, a restaurateur and host of the reality show Restaurant 911.
- Parvesh Cheena as Trivia Game Host
- Charlie Korman as Caleb
- Zoe Perry as Officer Binkowski, a police officer
- Seth Green as Chad, Darlene's friend
- Jane Lynch as Jean, the Conners' lawyer

== Episodes ==
Season	Episodes	Originally released		Rank	Avg. viewers (millions)
Season	Episodes	First released	Last released	Rank	Avg. viewers (millions)
1	11	October 16, 2018	January 22, 2019	31	9.53
2	20	September 24, 2019	May 5, 2020	37	7.73
3	20	October 21, 2020	May 19, 2021	48	5.64
4	20	September 22, 2021	May 18, 2022	51	4.76
5	22	September 21, 2022	May 3, 2023	46	4.96
6	13	February 7, 2024	May 22, 2024	52	4.11
7	6	March 26, 2025	April 23, 2025	TBA	TBA

== Production ==
=== Development ===
On May 29, 2018, ABC cancelled Roseanne despite initially renewing it for an eleventh season, following racist Twitter posts made by Roseanne Barr (who starred as Roseanne Conner) about Valerie Jarrett, a former advisor to former president Barack Obama. In June, reports swirled that the show could possibly continue under a different title and focus on the Darlene character; the show ultimately continued but focused on the Conner family as a whole, becoming more of an ensemble cast. Around June 15, 2018, reports emerged that ABC was close to making a deal to indeed continue the show. Barr is not involved in any way in the new program, and likely received a one-time payment in return. John Goodman had stated that Roseanne Conner would be killed off, which indeed was the case.

On June 21, 2018, ABC ordered a 10-episode spin-off tentatively titled The Conners, and that rather than focusing on Darlene, it would involve every cast member except Barr. On August 28, 2018, Emma Kenney, Ames McNamara, and Jayden Rey, who starred as Harris Conner-Healy, Mark Conner-Healy, and Mary Conner, respectively, throughout the tenth season of Roseanne, were officially confirmed as series regulars for The Conners. On December 15, 2018, it was reported by Deadline Hollywood that preliminary negotiations were underway with the cast for a second season. Deadline later reported on March 21, 2019, that renewal was close. On March 22, 2019, ABC renewed the show for a 19-episode second season, which premiered on September 24, 2019.

On May 21, 2020, ABC renewed the series for a third season, which premiered on October 21, 2020. On March 18, 2021, the show's sound engineer and boom operator Terrel Richmond died after suffering a medical event on set. On May 14, 2021, ABC renewed the series for a fourth season, which premiered on September 22, 2021, with a live episode.

Katey Sagal plays John Goodman's character Dan Conner's wife on the series. Both Sagal and Roseanne Barr were serious considerations by producers in 1987 for the role of Peggy Bundy on the series Married... with Children, one year before the Roseanne series went into development. The role of Peggy Bundy was ultimately won by Sagal, who would then later replace Barr on The Conners as Dan's second wife.

On May 13, 2022, ABC renewed the series for a fifth season. which premiered on September 21, 2022. In August 2022, Michael Fishman confirmed that his character D.J. Conner would be written out of the show for the fifth season. He did not give an explanation for the character's departure, but stated it was not his decision. On October 12, 2022, ABC expanded the series' fifth season to feature its largest season to date, ordering 22 episodes for the 2022–23 U.S. TV season, which concluded on May 3, 2023. On May 16, 2023, ABC renewed the series for a sixth season, which premiered on February 7, 2024. On May 10, 2024, ABC renewed the series for a six-episode seventh and final season, which premiered on March 26, 2025.

=== Filming ===
Production on the series began on August 31, 2018, at the Warner Bros. Studios lot in Burbank, California. On October 26, 2018, ABC announced it had ordered an additional episode, bringing the first season's total number to 11. Production on the third season began on August 17, 2020.

== Release ==
=== Broadcast ===
The series premiered on October 16, 2018, on ABC in the United States, on CTV in Canada and on Network 10 in Australia. It began being shown in the United Kingdom on Sky Comedy on January 2, 2023.

=== Syndication ===
On August 8, 2023, Werner Entertainment has signed a global licensing deal with Lionsgate’s Worldwide Television Distribution Group and Debmar-Mercury to make past episodes of The Conners available in syndication, which began in September 2024. Reruns of The Conners debuted on The CW on January 4, 2024. Deadline Hollywood reported on February 14, 2024, that reruns of The Conners will air in syndication, starting September 2024.

=== Streaming ===
The Conners is available on The CW app since January 5, 2024. The first five seasons were released on Netflix in the US on March 27, 2024. As of January 2024, all seasons that have previously aired can be seen for free, with ads, on the CTV app in Canada. In July 2024, the series' first five seasons were added to Prime Video in Canada, accessible via a subscription.

== Reception ==
=== Ratings ===
The Conners has been a strong and consistent performer for ABC, ranking as the #1 new comedy for the 2018 TV season in both the key demographic of adults 18–49 (2.2 rating) as well as in total viewers (9.5 million). When compared to all other broadcast network TV shows, The Conners finished the 2018–19 TV Season as the 16th highest rated program in the 18–49 demo, the third highest-rated comedy in the 18–49 demo (behind the final season of The Big Bang Theory at #1, and its spin-off Young Sheldon at #2), 31st place overall in total viewers and as the #4 comedy in total viewers (behind The Big Bang Theory, Young Sheldon, and Mom on CBS).

Even with the overall solid ratings performance of The Conners, it is worth noting that viewership has decreased drastically. The Roseanne revival finished the 2017–18 TV season with a 5.0 rating in the 18–49 demo, and 17.8 million viewers, making it the #3 show overall in both the 18–49 demo as well as in total viewers. Still, The Conners has been an undeniable hit for ABC, with its first season ratings nearly doubling the average rating of all prime time shows to air on ABC during the 2018–19 season. ABC finished that season in last place among the "big four" TV networks in the 18–49 demo (1.2 average rating) and second-to-last in total viewers with an average of just 5.6 million.

The 2019–2020 TV season was a turbulent one for the industry, with most networks and programs seeing a rather dramatic decline in ratings. Viewership across the board has been "paltry" and "inauspicious"—a "rude awakening" for the television industry, according to Deadline. Bucking the industry trend in its second season, however, The Conners ratings were remarkably consistent from one episode to the next, down only slightly from season one. The show actually improved its rank with younger viewers; it was the #2 highest rated comedy in the 18–49 demo (with the final season of Modern Family edging it out for the top spot by around 275,000 young viewers per week). The Conners remains by far the highest-rated comedy on ABC.

Viewership and ratings per season of The Conners
Season	Timeslot (ET)	Episodes	First aired		Last aired		TV season	Viewership rank	Avg. viewers (millions)
Season	Timeslot (ET)	Episodes	Date	Viewers (millions)	Date	Viewers (millions)	TV season	Viewership rank	Avg. viewers (millions)
1	Tuesday 8:00 p.m.	11	October 16, 2018	10.56	January 22, 2019	7.74	2018–19	31	9.53
2	Tuesday 8:00 p.m.	20	September 24, 2019	5.77	May 5, 2020	6.05	2019–20	37	7.73
3	Wednesday 9:00 p.m.*	20	October 21, 2020	4.90	May 19, 2021	3.38	2020–21	48	5.64
4	Wednesday 9:00 p.m.*	20	September 22, 2021	3.51	May 18, 2022	2.92	2021–22	51	4.76
5	Wednesday 8:00 p.m.	22	September 21, 2022	3.73	May 3, 2023	3.65	2022–23	TBD	TBD
6	Wednesday 8:00 p.m. (1–9); Wednesday 9:32 p.m. (10–13)	13	February 7, 2024	3.59	May 22, 2024	2.15	2023–24	TBD	TBD
7	Wednesday 8:00 p.m. (1–5); Wednesday 8:30 p.m. (6)	6	March 26, 2025	3.24	April 23, 2025	3.14	2024–25	TBD	TBD

- Note: The eighth and sixteenth episodes of the third season aired out their regular timeslot at Wednesday 10 pm and 9:30 pm respectively.

=== Critical response ===
The review aggregator website Rotten Tomatoes reports a 93% approval rating for season 1 based on 55 reviews from critics, with an average score of 7.9/10. The site's consensus reads, "The Conners offers the comforts of its source show, but more focus on the family's ever-evolving dynamics adds a welcome layer of working-class empathy without losing any of the laughs." Metacritic, which uses a weighted average, assigned a score of 75 out of 100, based on 24 critics, indicating "generally favorable reviews". As part of the conditions of receiving an advance release, critics were forbidden from divulging how Roseanne Conner was written out of the series.

Roseanne Barr said having her character killed by an opioid overdose "lent an unnecessary grim and morbid dimension to an otherwise happy family show."

Lecy Goranson received particular praise from critics for her performance in the season one episode "Miracles".

=== Accolades ===
Year	Award	Category	Nominee(s)	Result	Ref.
2019	Critics' Choice Television Awards	Best Supporting Actress in a Comedy Series	Laurie Metcalf	Nominated	
2019	Primetime Creative Arts Emmy Awards	Outstanding Multi-Camera Picture Editing for a Comedy Series	Brian Schnuckel (for "Keep On Truckin'")	Nominated	
2020	Primetime Creative Arts Emmy Awards	Outstanding Multi-Camera Picture Editing for a Comedy Series	Brian Schnuckel (for "Slappy Holidays")	Nominated	
2021	Critics' Choice Television Awards	Best Supporting Actress in a Comedy Series	Lecy Goranson	Nominated	
2021	Primetime Creative Arts Emmy Awards	Outstanding Cinematography for a Multi-Camera Series	Donald A. Morgan (for "A Stomach Ache, a Heart Break and a Grave Mistake")	Nominated	
2021	Primetime Creative Arts Emmy Awards	Outstanding Multi-Camera Picture Editing for a Comedy Series	Brian Schnuckel (for "Jeopardé, Sobrieté and Infidelité")	Won	
2022	Primetime Creative Arts Emmy Awards	Outstanding Cinematography for a Multi-Camera Series	Donald A. Morgan (for "The Wedding of Dan and Louise")	Nominated	
2024	Primetime Creative Arts Emmy Awards	Outstanding Cinematography for a Multi-Camera Series (Half-Hour)	Donald A. Morgan (for "Fire and Vice")	Nominated	
2025	Primetime Creative Arts Emmy Awards	Outstanding Picture Editing for a Multi-Camera Comedy Series	Brian Schnuckel (for "The Truck Stops Here")	Nominated	

== See also ==
- The Hogan Family, the revamp of sitcom Valerie, after star Valerie Harper was fired and her eponymous character was killed off.
