= Jerry O' =

- Presented by: Jerry O'Connell
- Country of origin: United States
- Original language: English
- No. of seasons: 1
- No. of episodes: 15

Production
- Camera setup: Multi-camera
- Running time: 60 minutes
- Production companies: Funny or Die; 3 Arts Entertainment; Debmar-Mercury

Original release
- Network: Syndication
- Release: August 12 – August 30, 2019

Jerry O' is an American television talk show hosted by actor Jerry O'Connell. He used The Wendy Williams Show studio to record the show as a test pilot.

The show was only broadcast 15 episodes (all in August 2019).
