= Nick Cannon (talk show) =

American syndicated talk show (2021–2022)

- Genre: Talk show
- Directed by: Rob George
- Presented by: Nick Cannon
- Opening theme: "Hey Nick" by Nick Cannon
- Country of origin: United States
- Original language: English
- No. of seasons: 1
- No. of episodes: 129

Production
- Executive producers: Nick Cannon; Katy Davis; Michael Goldman; Matt Strauss
- Production locations: Metropolitan Studios; New York, New York
- Running time: 42 minutes
- Production companies: Debmar-Mercury; NCredible

Original release
- Network: First-run syndication
- Release: September 27, 2021 – May 27, 2022

Nick Cannon is an American syndicated daytime talk show hosted by Nick Cannon that ran from September 27, 2021, to May 27, 2022.

== Production and development ==
In September 2019, it was announced a new talk show hosted by Cannon with Debmar-Mercury and Cannon's production company NCredible, set to premiere in 2020. The announcement came after he was a fill-in host on The Wendy Williams Show while she took an extended hiatus to focus on her heath. Cannon said in an interview about the show: "After leaving ‘America’s Got Talent,’ I wanted to focus on developing my own talk show. I’ve always dreamed of a platform where I can speak to America and discuss pop culture, as well as the topics on everyone’s minds."

In April 2020, Debmar-Mercury confirmed that the talk show's premiere date was set for September 21 and cleared in more than 90% of the U.S.

=== Controversy and delay ===
In July 2020, the talk show was postponed after Cannon made antisemitic comments on his podcast, which he later apologized for. Despite the comment, Debmar-Mercury and its parent company Lionsgate Television still stood by Cannon, as they believed it did not "reflect his true feelings and his apology is heartfelt and sincere".

In January 2021, it was announced thaf the show was set to debut in the fall.

=== Cancellation ===
In March 2022, it was announced that the show had been cancelled due to low ratings. Out of the daytime talk shows in syndication at the time, it was the lowest-rated one, averaging a 0.4 rating (roughly about 400,000 viewers) and ranking in the bottom three in first-run syndication. It was also announced that The Jennifer Hudson Show would take its place.

Production ended on March 10 with the finale airing on May 27.
