= Robert Van Horne =

Robert Van Horne (born April 23, 1948) is an American composer and concert pianist. One of the most influential jazz pianist teachers during his musical training was George Shearing.

He studied Classical music at the Philadelphia Academy of Music graduating with double degrees in Piano performance and Music education. Afterwards, he continued his musical education with popular and jazz styles of composing and improvisation.

He has recorded 6 piano albums, entitled, "Piano & Memories," "Rhapsody," "Moonlight Piano," "Embraced by a Dream," "China Love" and "Forever Amor" as well as 2 piano music books under WPI Records label.

In addition, he has composed a concerto for piano and orchestra, called "The Great Wall Concerto," after visiting China's wonder of the world.

Robert has performed both in Asia and the U.S.

Since 1993, Robert has been a Writer & Publisher Member of ASCAP (American Society of Composers, Authors, and Publishers). He is also member of MTAC (Music Teachers Association of California). In 2001, he joined Toastmasters International.

He was awarded the MTAC Composer Today awards in 1998 and 2010.
