= Robert Horn =

Robert Horn (or variants) may refer to:

- Robert Horn (water polo) (1931–2019), American water polo player
- Robert Horn (writer), American playwright and screenwriter
- Robert E. Horn (born 1933), American political scientist and professor
- Robbie Horn (born 1977), Scottish footballer
- Bob Horn (broadcaster) (1916–1966), radio and TV presenter
- Bob Horn (American football) (born 1954), National Football League linebacker

== See also ==
- Robert Horne (disambiguation)
- Robert T. Van Horn (1824–1916), American lawyer and publisher
