= Dave Caplan =

American television writer and producer

- Born: Los Angeles, California, U.S.
- Education: BA, California State University, Northridge (CSUN); MA, Fielding Graduate University (psychology)
- Occupations: Television / film producer, director
- Years active: 1990-present

Dave Caplan (born May 6, 1959) is an American television writer and Executive Producer of prime-time comedies. He co-developed and serves as writer/executive producer of ABC's The Conners. He was a writer/co-Executive on the reboot of Roseanne, which was the most-watched scripted TV show of the 2018–2019 season.

== Education ==
Born in Los Angeles, California, Caplan graduated from the TV/Film school at California State University, Northridge (CSUN) with a Bachelor of Arts (BA) degree. Caplan began his career when he was accepted into the prestigious Warner Brothers Writers Workshop in 1989, having his script chosen out of thousands of submissions. Caplan also holds a doctoral degree in psychology, with a specialty in media psychology, from Fielding Graduate University.

== Writing career ==
Caplan's early career saw him writing for such critically lauded comedies as Roseanne and Parker Lewis Can't Lose. He was promoted to writer/Producer on the acclaimed hit ABC-TV series Dinosaurs. Based on his work on that show, Caplan was rewarded with the first of three "overall" talent deals with Disney Television.

Moving on to Warner Brothers Television, Caplan served as writer/Executive Producer on the ABC hit comedies George Lopez and The Drew Carey Show. In addition to comedy, Caplan helped to launch the record-setting TNT drama Rizzoli & Isles by serving as Consulting Producer. Most recently, Caplan was writer/Executive Producer/co-showrunner for the unprecedented 90-episode pickup of FX comedy Anger Management, starring Charlie Sheen.

== Awards ==
Caplan was awarded the Humanitas Certificate for the George Lopez episode, “The Kidney Stays in the Picture”. The award was for addressing the pressing need for organ donation. The Writers Guild of America West recognized Caplan for his writing contribution to Roseanne, which was feted as one of the 101 best written TV series. In 2011, Caplan was honored with the Cinematheque Award for Alumni by California State University, Northridge.
