= Bruce Rasmussen =

American television producer and writer (born 1961)

- Born: March 18, 1961 (age 64); Bridgeport, Connecticut, U.S.
- Occupation(s): Producer, writer
- Years active: 1989–present

Bruce Rasmussen (born March 18, 1961) is an American television producer and writer. He was the supervising producer with the hit TV series Roseanne in 1992, for which he was awarded a Golden Globe, a Peabody, and a Humanitas Prize, and went on to produce The Drew Carey Show in 1995 and co-create Freddie in 2005. His other television credits include The Norm Show, Raines, Cane, Without a Trace, Trauma, The Middle, and The Defenders.
