= Drew Live =

- The Drew Carey Show episode
- Episode no.: Season 5 Episode 8
- Directed by: Gerry Cohen
- Written by: Clay Graham
- Production code: 225410
- Original air date: November 10, 1999

Guest appearances
- John Carroll Lynch as Steve Carey; Colin Mochrie as Eugene; Wayne Brady as himself; Brad Sherwood as himself; Laura Hall as herself; Arturo Brachetti as himself; Steven Whitaker as the Stripper

Episode chronology
← Previous "Red, White and Drew"	Next → "Drew Cam"

"Drew Live" is the eighth episode of the fifth season of the American sitcom The Drew Carey Show, and the 109th overall. The episode's plot focuses on Drew (Drew Carey) trying to stop his friend, Kate (Christa Miller), from pursuing a relationship with a mystery man, as Drew is in love with her. However, Drew is unaware that he is stopping Kate from pursuing him. Meanwhile, Drew's brother Steve Carey (John Carroll Lynch) and his fiancée Mimi Bobeck (Kathy Kinney) hold a joint bachelor and bachelorette party.

The episode was written by Clay Graham and directed by Gerry Cohen. It first aired on November 10, 1999 on the ABC network in the United States. Executive producer and series co-creator, Bruce Helford came up with the idea for "Drew Live" after seeing medical drama ER's live episode in 1997. To make "Drew Live" stand out, two-minute improvisational segments, in which the cast had to invent their own lines, were added in during filming. The cast and crew performed the episode live three times for the Eastern, Mountain and Pacific time zones. It was shot on tape and broadcast with a small delay. Performers from Whose Line Is It Anyway? also made guest appearances.

"Drew Live" was seen by 19.1 million viewers, finishing inside the Top 10 in the ratings for the week of November 8–14, 1999. It was the third highest-rated show on ABC that week and the most watched episode of The Drew Carey Show in 44 weeks. It received mixed reviews from critics, with The Boston Globe's Matthew Gilbert calling it "gimmicky" and "a smug mess". David Bianculli from the Daily News branded it "a hoot", and Bill Brioux of Canoe.ca praised the cast for being "fearless".

== Plot ==
Steve Carey stops at The Winfred-Lauder department store to ask his brother, Drew about the plans for his bachelor party. Steve becomes upset with his fiancée, Mimi when she reveals the plans for her bachelorette party include a visit to a strip club. Steve later finds Mimi at The Warsaw Tavern and they make up by deciding to combine their bachelor and bachelorette parties together. Kate O'Brien tells Lewis Kiniski that since Drew is dating again, she is finally going to confess her feelings for him. Drew and Oswald Lee Harvey overhear Kate and Lewis talking, but Drew does not realise Kate is talking about him and believes he may have lost his chance to be with her. He then decides that during Steve and Mimi's party, he will try to make Kate fall out of love with the mystery man.

At the party, Drew nervously waits for Kate, while Steve is worried about the men making the ladies feel uncomfortable with their bad behavior. However, his fears are swept aside when the women hire a male stripper. Drew asks Lewis to tell him who Kate is in love with. Lewis tries to give Drew a series of clues, but Drew does not get them. When Kate arrives, Drew believes that she is in love with Wayne Brady and tries to confront him. Drew's co-worker, Eugene sings a love song to him, but Drew thinks he is singing it to Kate. Eugene eventually kisses Drew, revealing his crush on him. When Drew finally gets the chance to speak with Kate, he tells Oswald that he does not feel that he is ready to be in a serious relationship with her because he has behaved badly.

== Production ==
=== Conception and development ===
On July 28, 1999, Don Aucoin from The Boston Globe reported that The Drew Carey Show would film a live, partly unscripted episode in November that year. Aucoin said the cast would also take part in improvisational comedy during the episode and it would be performed three times for different time zones. Executive producer and series co-creator, Bruce Helford commented "It's live, there's gonna be improv, anything can happen. I just hope they don't tap the keg until the third show." Since The Drew Carey Show began airing in 1995, several stunts were implemented to keep the show "fresh". Helford believed television had become stale and he and Carey wanted to "shake it up" with their various stunt episodes. Helford also described the live episode as having a similar feel to the live television shows from the past. Carey joked that the live episode meant he and the other cast members did not have to do multiple retakes. He added that he was doing it for the "publicity, ratings and for kicks".

Helford was inspired by the NBC medical drama ER, who aired their own live episode two years prior. When he approached Carey with the idea for the episode, Carey was initially dismissive, until Helford informed him of the improvisational segments. Carey liked the idea, as it would make the show stand out from previous live television episodes. Helford thought the ER episode was interesting, but that the fun had been lost. By adding in the element of improv, Helford said viewers would be "getting their money's worth" as anything could happen on the night. Carey decided against becoming involved with the planning of the episode as he believed it would ruin the spontaneity. "Drew Live" was written by Clay Graham and directed by Gerry Cohen. The plot centers on the characters Kate (Christa Miller) and Drew (Carey). When Drew learns Kate is trying to pursue a romantic relationship with a man, he tries to stop her because he loves her. However, he does not realise that he is stopping her from going after him.

=== Filming ===
The cast and crew performed the live episode three times for the Eastern, Mountain and Pacific time zones. Jamie Tarses, the head of ABC entertainment, stated that Helford and Carey had wanted the episode to be "live everywhere". Tarses tried to convince Carey to perform the episode twice for each coast, but he wanted all the viewers to share the same experience. To ensure each version of the episode was different, producers added in two-minute improvisational segments in which the actors had to invent their own lines. They did not know beforehand where the improv segments would appear, as the timing of the segments were decided during filming. The cast members were made aware of an upcoming improv scene when lights on the set flashed. They rehearsed with "a skeletal storyline" in the lead up to transmission.

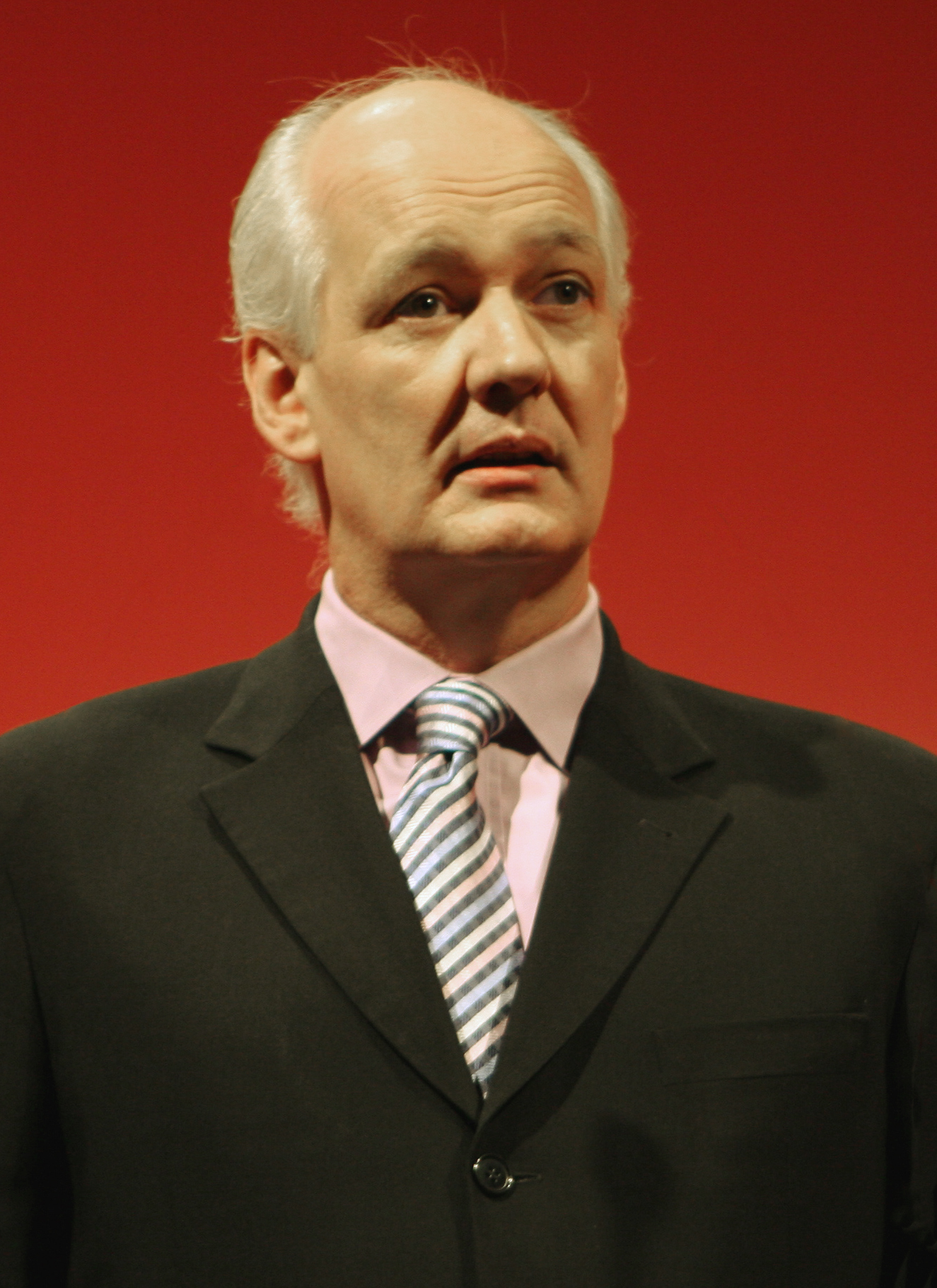
Improvisational comedian Colin Mochrie reprised his role as Eugene during the episode.

Unlike previous episodes, which were all shot on film, the live episode was shot on videotape. A production truck was used for the shoot, with Helford explaining, "We had to coordinate our timing of the show around when this truck is available. It is like a mobile coordinating room for directing and editing. We're editing it as you are seeing it." Security on the set was increased and the episode was broadcast with a small delay in case one of the actors said an offensive word. After "Drew Live" aired, a columnist for People reported that the three versions of the episode were performed without "many mistakes". However, a network censor used the delay to edit a scene involving a character who flashed his buttocks.

=== Cast ===
Carey admitted that he did not feel much pressure about the live episode because he was used to performing in front of live audiences during his stand-up career. He also had experience with improvisational comedy from his time hosting Whose Line Is It Anyway?. Similarly, Ryan Stiles was also a regular on Whose Line Is It Anyway?, and he and Kathy Kinney had performed live improv for over 20 years. Kinney thought they were the "least daunted" by the episode. As Miller and Diedrich Bader were not improv comics and more likely to struggle, Stiles told Susan King from the Los Angeles Times that he was on "damage control" during filming.

Joining the cast for "Drew Live" were several Whose Line regulars. Colin Mochrie reprised his role as Eugene from the previous season of The Drew Carey Show. Mochrie's agent stated that he and Carey would "test the limits of live TV" during the live episode. Brad Sherwood acted as the host and introduced the improv scenarios, while Wayne Brady and musician Laura Hall appeared during the various improv moments of the episode. Italian quick change artist Arturo Brachetti made a guest appearance.

== Reception ==
In its original broadcast, "Drew Live" was watched by 19.1 million viewers and finished 10th in the ratings for the week of November 8–14, 1999. It was the third highest-rated show on ABC that week, following episodes of Monday Night Football and Who Wants to Be a Millionaire? The episode also achieved the show's biggest audience in 44 weeks.

"Drew Live" received mixed reviews from critics. Bill Brioux, writing for Canoe.ca, thought that the live episode was "a high-wire act that few other shows could even contemplate." He went on to call the cast "fearless" and believed that they were more likely to pull the episode off successfully compared to cast members from other television shows. David Bianculli of the Daily News also enjoyed the episode, giving it three and a half stars out of five. He branded the episode "a hoot", and observed that Carey, Bader, Stiles, Sherwood and Mochrie handled the live element the best. He also said that Cohen had "captured the action perfectly", which was "a rather amazing achievement, considering how freewheeling much of it was".

The Boston Globe's Matthew Gilbert was not a fan of the episode, calling it "gimmicky", "a smug mess", and a "not-too-subtle" promotion for Whose Line Is It Anyway? An Akron Beacon Journal reporter was dismissive of the episode, saying "Well, it's good they got that out of their system." They thought there were a "few laughs", but branded it an "ill-fitting melding" of The Drew Carey Show and Whose Line Is It Anyway?. Greg Hassall from The Sydney Morning Herald gave the episode a thumbs up and said it was "Little more than a blokey version of theatresports, the format suits the show's ramshackle, self-congratulatory style. It's only intermittently funny, but fans should enjoy it."

In his list of notable prime-time live episodes, Mark Dawidziak from The Plain Dealer noted that the episode was "so much fun for the cast and fans" it led to the format being revisited in November 2000 and 2001. An Entertainment Weekly writer included the episode in their "7 Scripted TV Shows That Went Live" feature, saying "Drew Carey's history with improvisation went a long way as he steered his cast through three performances of the same episode."
