= Drew Carey's Back-to-School Rock 'n' Roll Comedy Hour =

- The Drew Carey Show episodes
- Episode nos.: Season 7 Episodes 1 and 2
- Directed by: Gerry Cohen
- Written by: Bruce Helford; Drew Carey; Clay Graham; Bruce Rasmussen; Les Firestein; Mike Teverbaug; Dan O'Keefe; Dave Caplan; Jana Hunter; Mitch Hunter; Julie Ann Larson; Sam Simon; Terry Mulroy; Linda Teverbaugh
- Production code: 227301/227302
- Original air date: September 26, 2001

Guest appearances
- Jenny McCarthy as Sketch Player; Amanda Bynes as Sketch Player; Adeline Allen as Six-Year-Old Girl; Roz Witt as Fifty-Year-Old Woman; Helen Slayton-Hughes as Eighty-Year-Old Woman; Nikki Vickers as the Little Girl; Peter Frampton as Himself; Chad Cromwell as Himself; Bob Mayo as Himself; John Regan as Himself; SHeDAISY as Themselves; Smash Mouth as Themselves; Sugar Ray as Themselves; Uncle Kracker as Himself

Episode chronology
← Previous "Bananas"	Next → "Drew Gets Out of the Nuthouse"

"Drew Carey's Back-to-School Rock 'n' Roll Comedy Hour" is a double-episode of the American television comedy series The Drew Carey Show, covering the first and second episodes of the seventh season, and the 155th and 156th episodes overall of the series. It first aired on September 26, 2001 on the ABC network in the United States. The episode, which does not follow the ongoing narrative of the sitcom, is formatted as a variety show, featuring the members of the cast along with guest stars Jenny McCarthy and Amanda Bynes performing comedy sketches out of character, loosely oriented around a middle/high school theme. Interspersed between sketches are musical performances from Sugar Ray, SHeDAISY, Smash Mouth, Uncle Kracker, and the Peter Frampton band.

The episode was first teased by Carey during an interview in July 2001. Filming for the episode had to be delayed after Carey fell ill and had to undergo an angioplasty. The music sequences had to be shot without Carey and a planned dance number could not be filmed until Carey was well enough. Carey returned to work two weeks after surgery and the episode was filmed on August 20, 2001.

"Drew Carey's Back-to-School Rock 'n' Roll Comedy Hour" was seen by an estimated 10 million viewers, making it the lowest season opener for the show at the time. It finished in 52nd place in the ratings for the week it aired. Critical response was mostly, but not universally, positive. The episode's sound editors received a nomination for Best Sound Editing in Television – Music, Episodic Live Action at the 49th Golden Reel Awards.

== Plot ==
The episode opens with Drew Carey and Jenny McCarthy planning a fishing trip. Ryan Stiles tells Drew that they have a show to do, but Drew does not want to return to work yet, so Stiles suggests they do something new and give the episode a back-to-school theme with sketches and music. A teenage Drew visits the doctor and learns about his "changing body". SHeDAISY perform at The Warsaw Tavern and Oswald and Lewis try to convince the band to let them be their back up singers. At a slumber party, Kate O'Brien and Jenny McCarthy practice kissing on each other, but stop the sketch after noticing the male crew members watching them. Oswald tries to impress McCarthy with his sports injury, but a flashback reveals he injured himself cheerleading. Meanwhile, Mimi Bobeck asks Smash Mouth not to steal her idea for a speed metal version of "The Wreck of the Edmund Fitzgerald".

Drew hosts a short educational film about cooties, while Kate presents a segment about how useful cheerleading is after high school. Uncle Kracker performs and Mimi asks him for his help with a crossword puzzle. Oswald tries going undercover at a school, but is not successful as he wears his police uniform. He tries going undercover with the mob and gets shot. After Peter Frampton performs, he shows Mimi a tattoo of her face on his chest, in the hope she will take him back, but Mimi rejects him. Drew practices talking to girls in the mirror and notices a zit on his forehead. The zit has the face and voice of Mr. Wick, and gives Drew some bad advice about talking to his crush. Sugar Ray leave with Mimi after their performance when they realise she is the woman on Frampton's chest. Drew tells the children at home to respect their teachers, except for one – his grade school teacher. He rants that he does not need math, but then misses out on a party when the lead singer of Sugar Ray tells him the location in the form of a word problem.

== Production ==
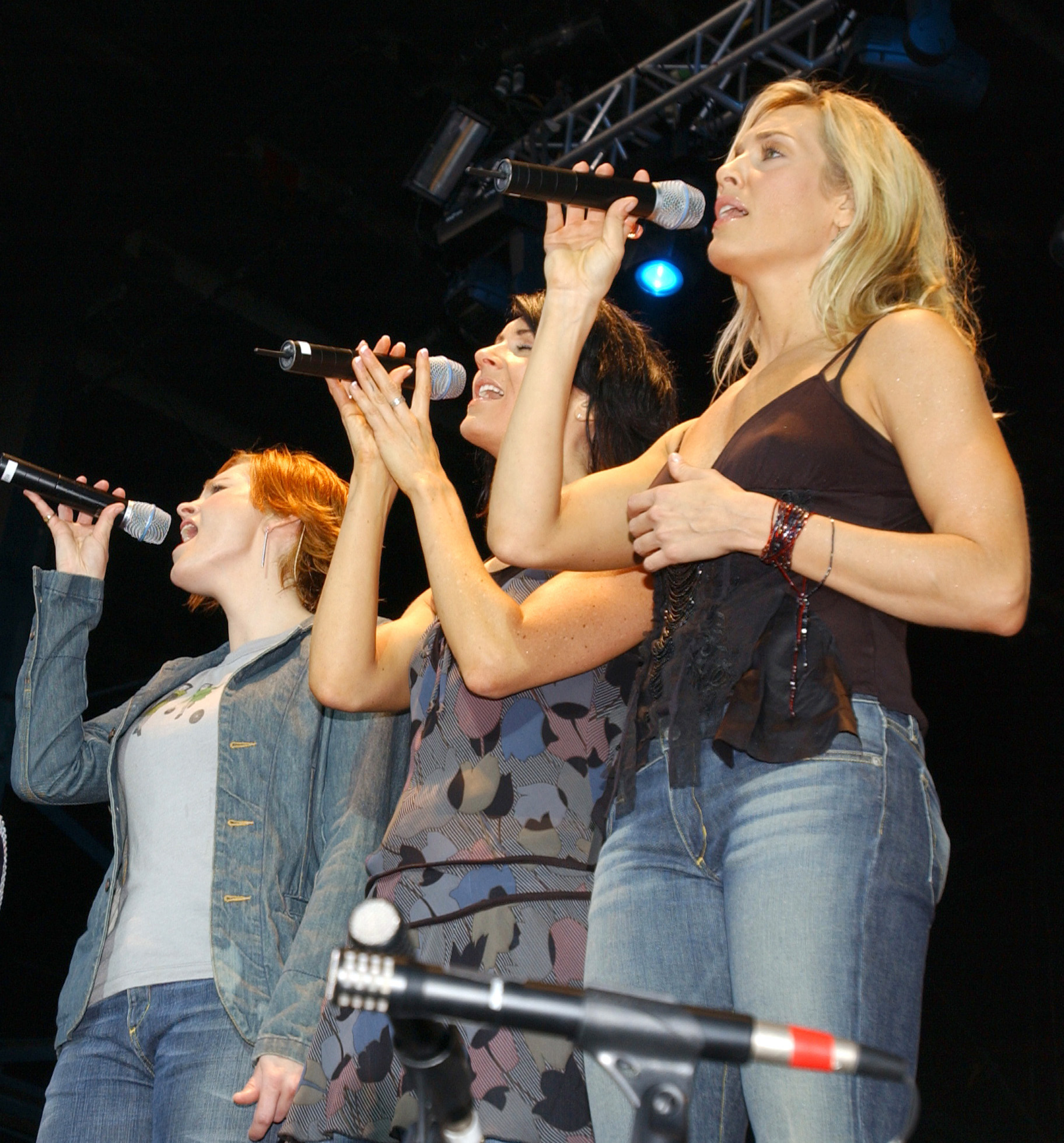
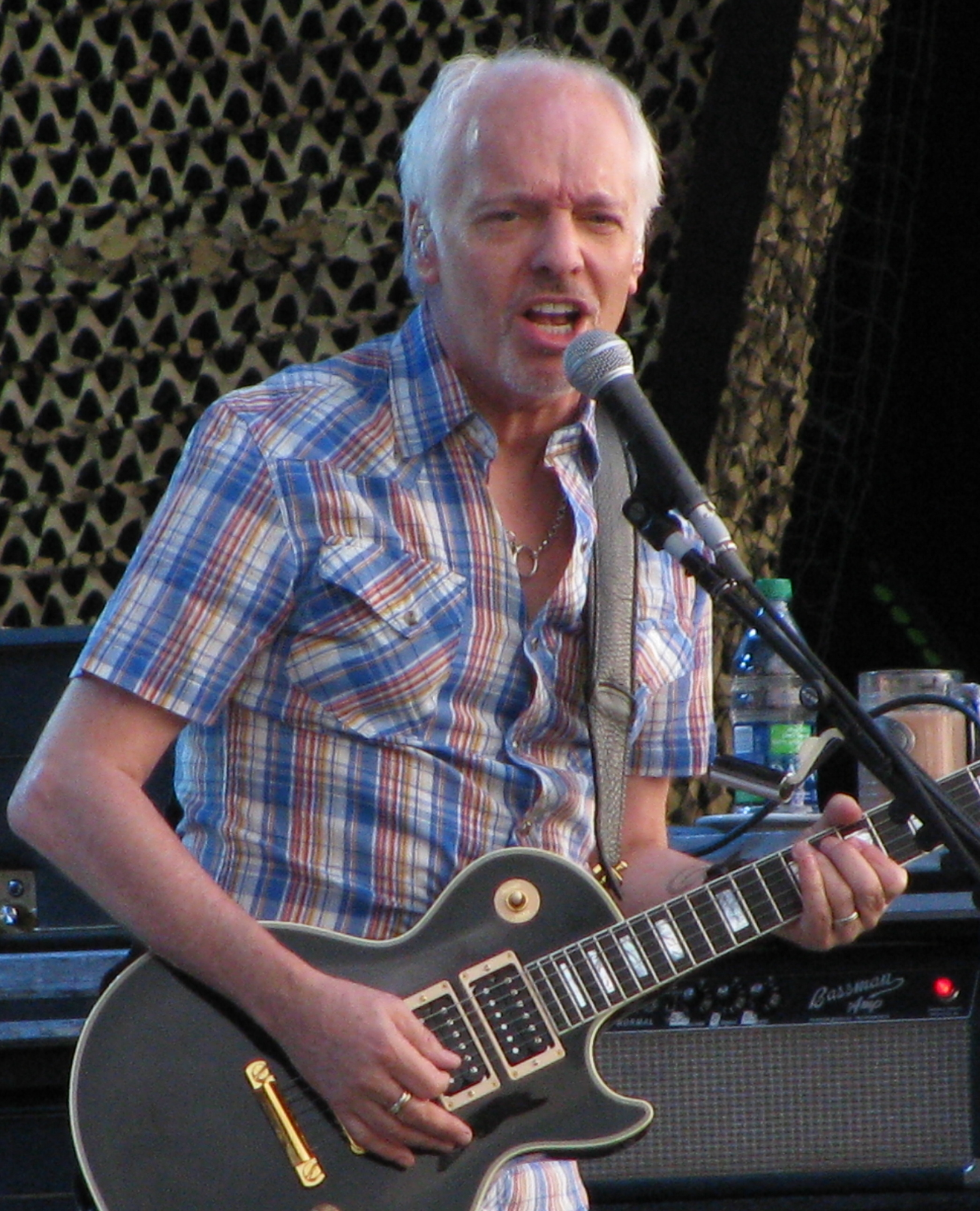
SHeDAISY and Peter Frampton were two musical acts who performed in the episode.

The episode was first teased by Drew Carey on July 25, 2001, during an interview with the Akron Beacon Journal's R.D. Heldenfels. Carey admitted that he was disappointed in the sixth season of The Drew Carey Show, which ended with Carey's character locked up in an asylum. Several changes and new ideas were implemented in a bid to improve the show and falling ratings ahead of the seventh-season premiere in September 2001. Carey announced that the new season would open with an hour-long back-to-school episode, featuring music performances. Carey said, "It's not going to be a regular show. It's going to be sketches about going back to school where we're going to play different people." In the same month, Atlantic Records announced that Uncle Kracker would be appearing in the episode.

On August 9, 2001, while working with the show's writers, Carey fell ill with chest pains and had to be taken to the hospital by ambulance. The following day, he underwent an angioplasty to help clear a blocked artery. Production on the show continued while Carey recovered and filming on the episode was due to start during the week commencing August 13, 2001. Executive producer Bruce Helford told Richard Huff of the Daily News that some things had to be moved around to accommodate Carey's absence, such as the music sequences, which had to be shot without Carey. Helford added that Carey's planned appearance in a dance number could not be shot until the comedian received the okay from his doctor. Carey returned to work two weeks later and the episode was eventually filmed on August 20, 2001.

"Drew Carey's Back-to-School Rock 'n' Roll Comedy Hour" featured guest appearances from actresses Amanda Bynes and Jenny McCarthy. In addition to Uncle Kracker, music performances also came from Sugar Ray and The Peter Frampton Band. Country music group SHeDAISY sang a re-mixed version of their song "I Will… But". Rock band Smash Mouth also filmed an appearance, performing their track "Pacific Coast Party". The band's vocalist Steve Harwell commented, "That was fun. That appearance, and a few lines in the film Rat Race, rekindled a childhood dream. I always said I wanted to be either a rock star or a comedian or an actor."

== Reception ==
In its original broadcast, "Drew Carey's Back-to-School Rock 'n' Roll Comedy Hour" finished 52nd in the ratings for the week of September 24–30, 2001, with a 4.8 rating/8 share among households with televisions. It was seen by a total of 10 million viewers, which made it the lowest season opener for the show and a significant decrease from the previous season's average audience of 12.8 million. The Washington Post's Lisa de Moraes reported that the show lost a large percent of its lead-in audience and commented "It also has absolutely no excuse for the lousy number, since it debuted opposite squat on the other networks."

The Charleston Daily Mail's Kevin McDonough chose the episode as a television "Highlight" for September 26, 2001. While a journalist named it the day's "Best Bet". A reporter for the Beaver County Times chose the repeat of the episode as their Highlight of the day on September 4, 2002, noting that it featured "a less-weighty Drew". A writer for Ain't It Cool News enjoyed the episode, giving it a maximum of five stars. The writer observed that it was not a typical episode, calling it "bizarre". They praised Stiles and Bader for their skit during the SHeDAISY performance, and they said "but more than that, the entire cast just kills! The writing, the acting, all are just hilarious." The writer added that the musical performances were the only thing from stopping the episode from being perfect, as they were not quite as good as the performances featured on Saturday Night Live or similar shows.

M.J. Wilde of The Augusta Chronicle noted, "Drew pumps up the volume in an hourlong season premiere that departs the format," and added, "You go, boy." Lisa Bettinger from BG News enjoyed the music performances and graded them a B−, saying that they were "worth watching". However, she disliked the episode's comedy sketches, giving them a C−. She said "The skits were odd and there was no cohesion to them, except for the fact that they were all related to going back to school. After a few minutes of bad sketches, I decided to go over to VH1 and watch a repeat of Behind the Music or something like that. Anything was better than what this episode of Drew Carey had to offer."

The sound editors for the episode earned a nomination for Best Sound Editing in Television – Music, Episodic Live Action at the 49th Golden Reel Awards, presented by the Motion Picture Sound Editors.
