= In Ramada Da Vida =

- The Drew Carey Show episode
- Episode no.: Season 4 Episode 2
- Directed by: Gerry Cohen
- Written by: Clay Graham
- Production code: 467502
- Original air date: September 30, 1998

Guest appearance
- List of guest stars: Nan Martin as Mrs. Louder; Joe Walsh as Ed; Pauley Perrette as Darcy; Joe Ho as Translator; Ian Gomez as Larry Almada; Rick Scarry as Hotel Manager; Roy Clark as himself; Jim Fox as himself; Dusty Hill as himself; Jonny Lang as himself; Lisa Loeb as herself; Dave Mustaine as himself; Rick Nielsen as himself; Dale Peters as himself; Joey Ramone as himself; Slash as himself; Michael Stanley as himself; Matthew Sweet as Himself

Episode chronology
← Previous "Drew and the Conspiracy"	Next → "Golden Boy"

"In Ramada Da Vida" is the second episode of the fourth season of the American sitcom The Drew Carey Show, and the 77th overall. It first aired on September 30, 1998 on the ABC network in the United States. The plot of the episode sees Drew (Drew Carey) and his friends form a band to play at a Ramada Inn. After they are offered a regular gig by the hotel manager, they realise they need a guitarist and audition several hopefuls. Meanwhile, Kate O'Brien (Christa Miller) decides to quit her job to find something more fulfilling.

The episode was written by Clay Graham and directed by Gerry Cohen. It was filmed in Los Angeles during the week commencing August 24, 1998. The episode's usual theme tune sequence was replaced by an elaborate opening that shows the characters carrying out a series of repetitive actions. "In Ramada Da Vida" featured guest appearances from several musicians chosen by Carey, including Lisa Loeb, Slash, Joey Ramone, Dave Mustaine, and James Gang members Joe Walsh, Jim Fox and Dale Peters. The episode also marked the first of five guest appearances by Pauley Perrette as Drew's groupie girlfriend Darcy.

"In Ramada Da Vida" was seen by an estimated 11.4 million viewing households, finishing in 11th place in the ratings for the week it aired. Critical response was mixed to positive. Steve Johnson from the Chicago Tribune thought it demonstrated a "shaggy charm" and observed that Carey worked well with the plot. While Neal Justin of the Star Tribune enjoyed Walsh's "hilarious" performance and the opening sequence. However, he did not think the jokes were quite good enough. While The Sydney Morning Herald's Bruce Elder did not care for the episode beyond the opening minutes.

== Plot ==
Drew is tasked with entertaining some Vietnamese investors, who are thinking of opening a Winfred-Louder department store in Hanoi. During drinks at a Ramada Inn, Drew and his friends, Lewis Kiniski and Oswald Lee Harvey, notice the house band is on a break and take to the stage to entertain the investors. The hotel's manager enjoys their performance and asks them to play at the Inn for the rest of the week. Drew thinks it would be a distraction, but changes his mind when he meets Darcy, a groupie who finds him attractive. The guys audition for a guitar player and after turning down a number of guitarists, they hire Ed, believing that his skills will not show them up. Meanwhile, Drew's friend, Kate O'Brien, tries to get herself fired as she hates her job. Drew allows Kate to quit, but promises that he will re-hire her if she cannot find another job in a week.

Mimi Bobeck comes to the Inn to inform Drew that he is expected to appear at a party hosted by Mrs. Louder, as they have closed the Vietnam deal. Mimi laughs at Drew when he chooses to skip the party and continue playing with the band. The hotel manager invites the Horndogs to become the Inn's new permanent house band, but Oswald and Lewis have to quit because they cannot handle having two jobs. When Drew's boss, Mr. Wick, asks him to set up the new store in Vietnam, Drew decides to turn down the promotion to stay with the band, which continues with two new members. When Kate asks for her old job back, Drew breaks their deal, telling her that he wants her to find something she loves, like he has with his band.

== Production ==
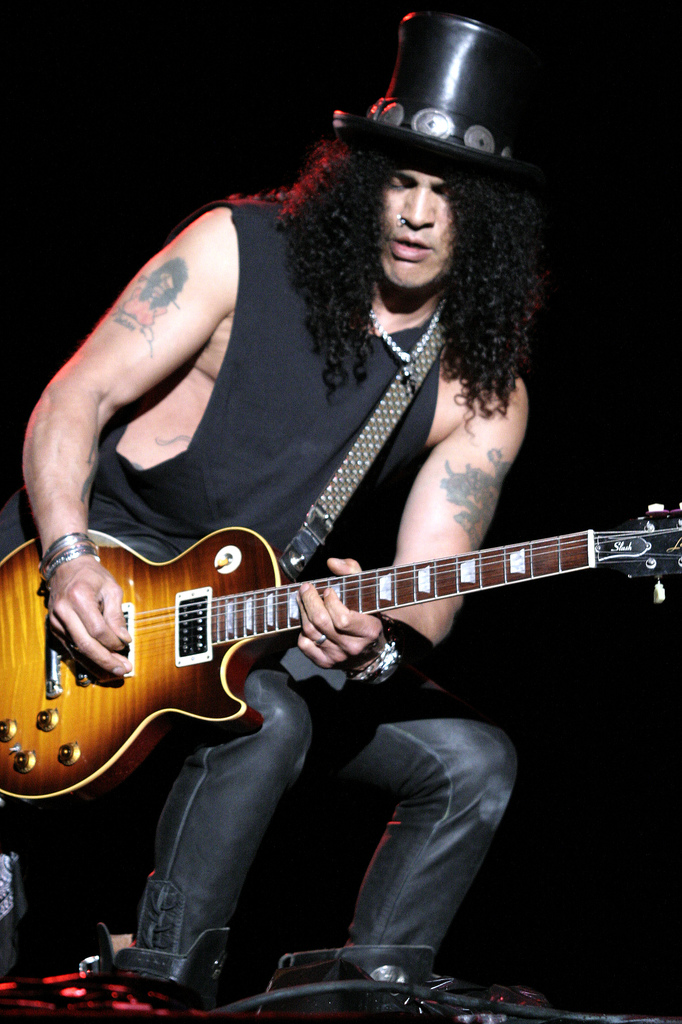
The episode featured appearance from several musicians, including Slash.

Carey first teased the plot of the episode on August 3, 1998 during an interview with Phil Rosenthal of the Chicago Sun-Times. Carey mentioned that the episode would see his character holding auditions for his band and turning down a number of famous guitarists. A reporter for MTV.com said that various musicians had been approached to appear in the episode, including Lisa Loeb, Slash, Joey Ramone and Jonny Lang. Further details were released on August 15, when Carey confirmed that there would be a new musical number featured in the episode. He said, "it's something somebody did in the '80s that we're going to make a humorous version of. I can't tell you anything because it's not finalized, but it involves special effects and really cool music." It was later announced that James Gang musicians Joe Walsh, Jim Fox and Dale Peters would be guest starring in the episode as members of Drew's band. Commenting on his casting, Walsh said "I guess I'm going to see myself on television. I'm going to turn the sound down and pretend it's the Joe Walsh show with special guest Drew Carey."

"In Ramada Da Vida" was written by Clay Graham and directed by Gerry Cohen. It was filmed in Los Angeles during the week commencing August 24, 1998. The episode's plot sees Drew and his friends form a band to play at their local Ramada Inn, and hold auditions for a guitarist in Drew's back garden. The episode's theme tune sequence was replaced by an elaborate opening showing the characters repeating a series of "off-kilter office images" in homage to the 1981 Oscar-winning short film Tango while Leo Kottke's cover of Fleetwood Mac's "World Turning" is heard. The guitarists and musicians that audition for the position in the band are Joey Ramone, Slash, Lisa Loeb, Jonny Lang, Matthew Sweet, Dave Mustaine, Dusty Hill, Rick Nielsen, Roy Clark and Michael Stanley. Carey chose all of the musical guest stars himself. Ramone, who was better known for being a lead vocalist, relished the chance to play the guitar again and he was allowed to smash it up at the end of his scene. After his rejection, Ramone also improvised a line, which the crew found "hysterical". The episode also marked the first of five appearances by Drew's season four love interest Darcy, played by Pauley Perrette. Darcy was described as being "an ultra-hip and sexy rock groupie" by Marilyn Beck and Stacy Jenel Smith from the Los Angeles Daily News.

== Reception ==
In its original broadcast, "In Ramada Da Vida" finished 11th in the ratings for the week of September 28–October 4, 1998, with a Nielsen rating of 11.4, equivalent to approximately 11.3 million viewing households. It was the third highest-rated show on ABC that week, following episodes of 20/20 and Home Improvement.

"In Ramada Da Vida" was chosen as a "highlight" for the day of September 30, 1998 by a reporter for The Washington Post. Steve Johnson from the Chicago Tribune enjoyed the episode, despite not having liked the sitcom previously. He thought the opening was "oddly poetic" and said that the episode went on to exhibit "the shaggy charm that others have tried to convince me is typical." Johnson also said there were better jokes than usual and Carey worked well with the plot. However, he maintained that he still disliked Mimi and the show was "no more than a pleasant distraction". The Sydney Morning Herald's Bruce Elder loved the opening minutes of the episode, saying "marvel either at the organisation that went into constructing this wonderful, one-shot piece of frippery or, more likely, at the computer technology which can create a seamless single scene which looks like a one-shot." Elder found that he could not watch the rest of the episode.

The Star Tribune's Neal Justin gave the episode three out of five stars, and commented that Walsh should have his own show as he was "hilarious", while the opening was "complex" and "neat". However, Justin thought the "vaudeville bits" and jokes were not good enough, and added "Carey's self-deprecating fat jokes and Mimi's outrageous wardrobe are starting to grow tired." MTV Hive's Kenneth Partridge included Ramone's appearance in the episode to his list of "Great Moments in Joey Ramone TV". Partridge noted that Ramone "displays some previously unseen guitar heroics" and thought that he "looks darn cool in his leather pants and Misfits t-shirt." Erin Whitney and Christopher Rudolph from The Huffington Post included "In Ramada Da Vida" in their feature on the "14 Musician Cameos That Stole The Spotlight On Your Favorite Shows". Whitney and Rudolph observed that "Slash is too good for them, they turn down Dusty Hill of ZZ Top for his beard, and Joey Ramone is just too tall and skinny."
