= Drew Cam =

- The Drew Carey Show episode
- Episode no.: Season 5 Episode 9
- Directed by: Sam Simon
- Story by: Michael Becker
- Teleplay by: Holly Hester
- Production code: 225406
- Original air date: November 17, 1999

Guest appearance
- Rosa Blasi as Isabel

Episode chronology
← Previous "Drew Live"	Next → "Drew's Stomachache"

"Drew Cam" is the ninth episode of the fifth season of the American sitcom The Drew Carey Show, and the 110th overall. The episode sees Drew (Drew Carey) becoming a 24-hour salesman for the Winfred-Louder department store. Webcams are installed in his house and he has to promote the store's range of appliances. While Drew is out, the webcams continue to stream events that occur in his house. When the viewers become bored of Drew's life, Kate O'Brien (Christa Miller) is hired to play his girlfriend for the show. She is soon replaced by Isabel (Rosa Blasi), who Kate becomes jealous of. She eventually tells Drew that she loves him during the webcast.

The episode was written by Holly Hester, based on an idea by Michael Becker, and directed by Sam Simon. It first aired on November 17, 1999 on ABC in the United States. Parts of the episode were broadcast simultaneously on television and the Internet, a first for a primetime show. As ABC did not own the online rights to The Drew Carey Show, the company had to work with Warner Bros. Television to produce the webcast. Negotiations between the two companies began in June 1999. ABC and Warner Bros. Television hoped to target around 500,000 viewers of the estimated 4 million US households with Internet access that regularly watched the show.

"Drew Cam" was seen by an estimated 11.2 million viewers, finishing inside the top 20 in the ratings the week it aired. It was the second highest-rated episode of the fifth season. The webcast attracted one of the largest online audiences watching a streaming media event, with the website receiving almost two million visits and 650,000 streams. "Drew Cam" received mixed reviews from critics, with some calling it ambitious, while others thought it was nothing more than a marketing gimmick.

== Plot ==
At the Winfred-Louder department store, Mr. Wick tells Drew that Mimi Bobeck has had the idea of putting webcams in her apartment, so potential customers can watch her interact with the store's range of appliances in an attempt to increase sales. Mr. Wick then informs Mimi that the board felt she might overshadow the appliances, therefore the webcams will be installed in Drew's house. While Drew is working to advertise the various appliances, his friends Lewis and Oswald come over. Lewis is called outside by Kate O'Brien, who shows him a letter she wrote to Drew detailing her love for him. Lewis reminds Kate that Drew's therapist told him he is not ready for a relationship until he learns to love himself. The following day, Mr. Wick tells Drew that the viewers dislike his boring life and he plans to get a woman to live with him for the show. Lewis suggests Kate for the role and Mr. Wick accepts. Both Drew and Kate work hard to advertise the products, but Mr. Wick soon tells them that the viewers do not think they have chemistry, so he replaces Kate with Isabel, a Winfred-Louder employee.

Mimi asks to be on Drew's show, so she can promote her talents, but Drew denies her request. Online shopping for Winfred-Louder increases and Mr. Wick extends the promotion for another two weeks. Kate becomes jealous of Drew and Isabel's closeness. When Drew tells Kate that he is going to ask Isabel on a date, she gets upset and tries to put him off the idea. Lewis almost tells Drew what is going on with Kate, but he gets drunk and falls asleep before doing so. The next day, Kate visits Drew and notices Isabel wearing Drew's shirt. Kate confronts her, causing Isabel to leave. Kate finally admits to Drew that she is in love with him. Drew experiences happiness, surprise, and confusion, so Kate leaves him alone to think about it. Drew breaks up with Isabel, meaning he has to give back all the appliances. While Drew is out, Lewis and Oswald decide to use the new washer before it goes. They strip off, but noticing the camera, Lewis covers it with a shirt. When it falls off, the viewers see Oswald washing Lewis in a small bath tub.

== Production ==
"We want to see how the viewers respond to it and see how far we can push the internet in terms of simultaneous viewers to a stream."

— Patricia Vance, the senior vice president of ABC's Internet Group, on the episode.

On October 11, 1999, ABC and Warner Bros. Television announced that parts of the November 17 episode of The Drew Carey Show would be broadcast simultaneously on television and the internet, a first for a primetime show. The event would also mark the first time the internet arms of ABC and Warner Bros. would work together. The companies hoped to target around 500,000 viewers of the estimated 4 million U.S. households with internet access that regularly watched the show. Richard Tedesco of Broadcasting & Cable reported that the video would be streamed using Microsoft's Windows Media Player. ABC opted against simulcasting the full episode online as they were worried about a backlash from advertisers. The webcam footage was free of advertisements and audio, which would have caused the broadcast to fall out of sync.

The premise of the episode saw webcams installed in Drew's house after he becomes a 24-hour salesman for the Winfred-Louder department store where he works. When Drew leaves his house, the webcams continue to stream events involving other characters that the television audience does not get to see. Sequences include: Mr. Wick being tempted into his office by a woman wearing a dominatrix-cowgirl outfit; Ed McMahon bringing Drew a check for $10 million, only to find Drew is not home; the neighborhood dogs holding a party in the kitchen, dancing ghosts re-enacting a murder, and Oswald's "Belly Button Theater."

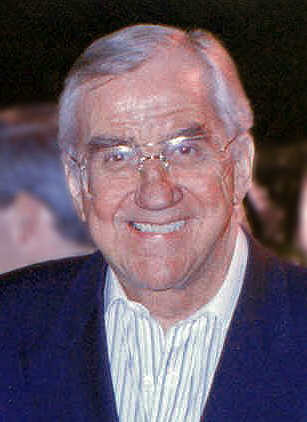
Ed McMahon makes a cameo appearance during the webcast.

The idea for the episode came from Michael Becker, an ABC creative consultant. Bruce Helford, co-creator of The Drew Carey Show, ran with it, aware that a large number of the show's viewers had internet access. The previous year, ABC.com's servers became overwhelmed when viewers went to the site to participate in an April Fools' Day competition. After being given the green light, Helford prepared scenes for the webcast, but most of his ideas rejected by the director, Sam Simon, and Carey himself. Helford commented, "You can't do regular scenes for the Web. It's a tiny little picture. Little jokes get lost." The episode was written by Holly Hester, based on Becker's idea. Keeping the connection speeds in mind, Simon got the actors to slow down their movements for the pre-taped webcast, so they would not create a blurry effect on-screen.

Since ABC did not own the online rights to The Drew Carey Show, the company had to negotiate with Warner Bros., where the show was produced. Helford, executive producer Deborah Oppenheimer and ABC.com representatives met with Jim Banister and John Kaufman from Warner Bros. to discuss the event in June that year. Banister and Kaufman thought The Drew Carey Show webcast would be "a great promotional opportunity." John Geirland of Network World reported that companies spent more than six weeks debating who would host the webcast, how the web traffic would be shared and the details of promotion and advertising the event. The production companies set up Winloud.com to host the webcast, while their respective websites linked to it. The websites also hosted interactive features, exclusive features, cast biographies, photo galleries and video clips.

Media company RealNetworks entered into negotiations to distribute the webcast, but talks collapsed and ABC and Warner Bros. decided to go with Microsoft instead. Since "Drew Cam" was going to be broadcast in three time zones, bringing in potentially thousands of online viewers, other partners were brought on board to help out. These included: Akamai Technologies, Don Mischer Technologies, E-Media, Enron Communications, Globix, Ibeam, InterVu, SandPiper-Digital Island and Sonic Foundry Media Services. Geirland observed that it took "an unprecedented degree of collaboration among the various network providers" to create the episode. Helford predicted the event would be the biggest "in the history of the internet", even outperforming the Victoria's Secret Fashion Show webcast that aired earlier in the year. Despite a small pre-air mistake, the episode and the webcast aired without any problems.

== Reception ==
=== Ratings ===
In its original broadcast, "Drew Cam" finished 19th in the ratings for the week of November 15–21, 1999 and was viewed by an estimated 11.2 million viewers. It received an 8.6 ratings share among adults between the ages of 18 and 49, and was the second highest-rated episode of the fifth season, following "Drew Live", which aired the week before. The webcast had more viewers than many cable networks on the same night. It attracted one of the largest online audiences watching a streaming media event in internet history. The website had close to two million visits, with 650,000 streams. In three hours, 277,000 video segments were downloaded.

=== Critical response ===
The episode received a mixed response from critics. Entertainment Weekly's Noah Robischon said the premise "sounds like typical high jinks for The Drew Carey Show." Robischon also said, "Sure, it's gimmicky. But it's also a preview of TV's future." Rik Fairlie from The New York Times branded the episode "one of the most ambitious, and winning, forays into Web/TV convergence." Network World's John Geirland concurred, calling the episode "one of the most ambitious experiments in convergence programming to date." David Bloom of the Sun-Sentinel thought the webcast was humorous.

Patti Hartigan from The Boston Globe found the webcast "was little more than a marketing gimmick." Tony Davis of The Sydney Morning Herald included the episode in his "TV previews" feature, but gave it a negative review. He stated, "Nineteen minutes of tosh masquerading as half an hour of comedy. The basic premise is that Drew and his mates are selling everyone (including themselves) via the Internet. A preamble on our preview tape advises you to see www.winloud.com if you want to have more fun. How you'd have less fun is hard to imagine."

The Orlando Sentinel's Nancy Imperiale Wellons disliked the webcast and thought the episode was enough. She said, "While it was a novel idea, and a tip of the hat to tomorrow's convergence of television and the Web, the gimmick was hampered by today's technological limitations." Wellons thought the webcast was "too small and dark to have much visual oomph". She also found the characters' dialogue during the episode was out of sync with the webcast.
