= Drew Live II =

- The Drew Carey Show episode
- Episode no.: Season 6 Episode 5
- Directed by: Gerry Cohen
- Written by: Brian Scully
- Production code: 226360
- Original air date: November 8, 2000

Guest appearances
- Wayne Brady as Wayne; Charles Esten as Chip; Kathy Greenwood as Kathryn; Laura Hall as Laura; Colin Mochrie as Eugene; Greg Proops as Greg; Brad Sherwood as Brad; Jay Leno as Lewis' Boss; Reggie Currelley as the Bartender; Elea Bartling as the Cashier

Episode chronology
← Previous "Mimi's a Partner"	Next → "The Pregnancy Scare"

"Drew Live II" is the fifth episode of the sixth season of the American sitcom The Drew Carey Show, and the 132nd overall. It first aired on November 8, 2000, on the ABC network in the United States. The episode's plot sees Drew (Drew Carey) open an employment agency, but he has trouble finding jobs for his friends Lewis Kiniski (Ryan Stiles) and Oswald Lee Harvey (Diedrich Bader).

The episode was written by Brian Scully and directed by Gerry Cohen. It was conceived after the success of the first live Drew Carey Show episode, which aired the previous year. Improvisational segments were added to a basic plot, and producers chose to keep many elements of the episode a secret from the cast. The episode was performed live three times for the Eastern/Central, Mountain and Pacific time zones. It featured guest appearances by several Whose Line Is It Anyway? cast members and talk show host Jay Leno.

"Drew Live II" was seen by an estimated 15.2 million viewers, finishing just outside the Top 20 in the ratings for the week of November 6–12, 2000. It was the sixth highest-rated show on ABC that week. Production mixer Klaus Landsberg was recognised for his work on the episode with a Primetime Emmy Award nomination.

== Plot ==
Drew returns to the Winfred-Louder department store to speak with his former boss Mr. Wick about his rejected unemployment claim. Wick tells him that he should not have quit his job, but Drew argues that he was fired. Mr. Wick tells him to take it up with the assistant director of personnel, which was Drew's former job. They go back and forth, until Drew gives up and Wick declares to the other employees that the show is over. Drew's co-worker, Eugene does not join in with the applause and tells Wick that he thinks what he did to Drew was cruel, so Wick fires him. Drew vows to help Eugene find a new job, before deciding to open his own employment agency.

Drew's friends Lewis Kiniski and Oswald Lee Harvey tell Drew that they are unhappy in their current jobs, so Drew offers to recommend them for mystery diner positions at Shenanigans restaurant. Drew later reveals that there is only one position available, but Lewis and Oswald have already quit their jobs. Drew cannot decide whom to pick, so Kate O'Brien suggests they go to Shenanigans to see who is better at the job. Both Lewis and Oswald are terrible, so Drew tells them they can work for him. Oswald realises that he went into the wrong office when he quit his job and returns to work. Lewis and Drew visit Lewis' boss at DrugCo to ask him to give Lewis his job back.

== Production ==
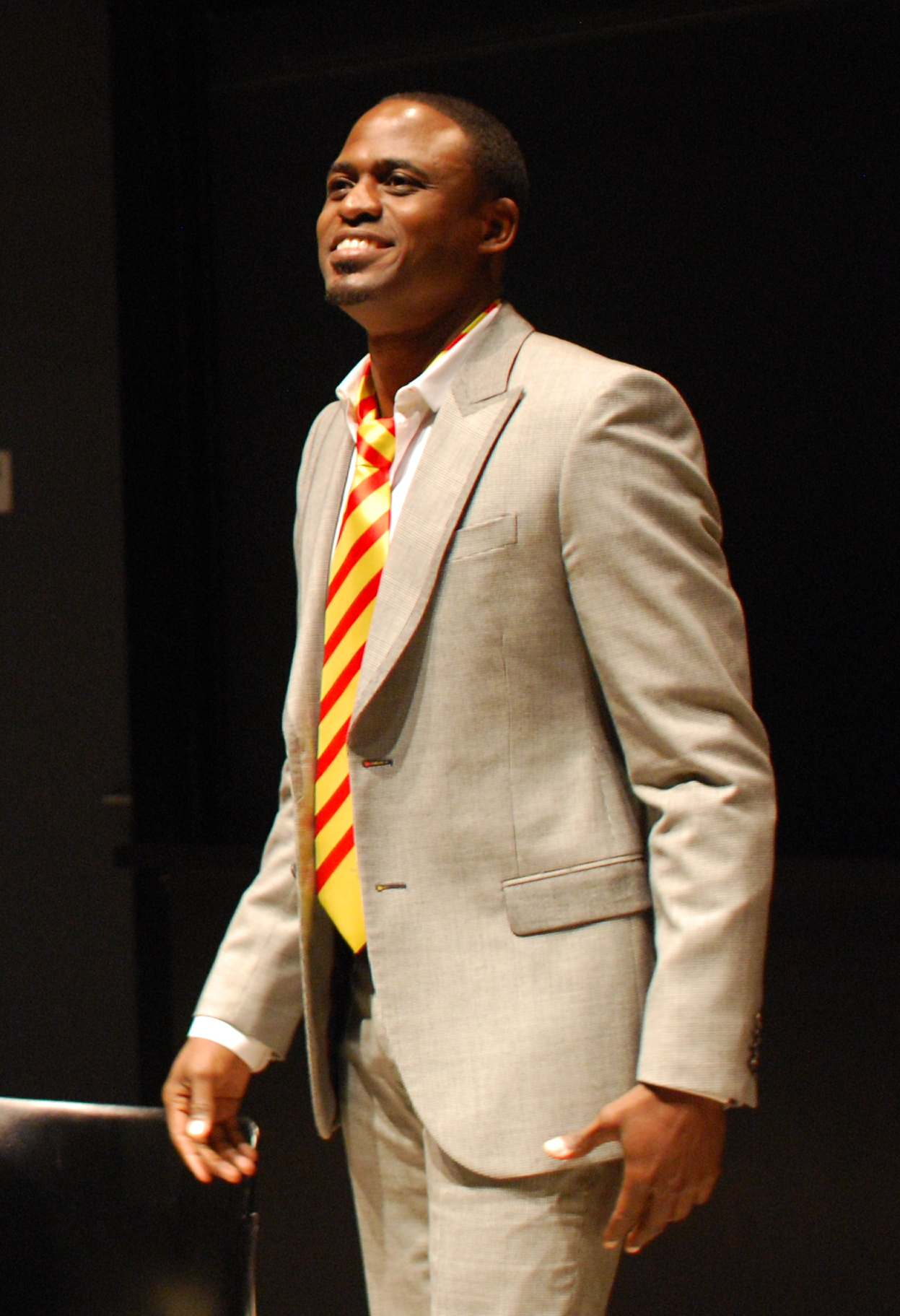
Wayne Brady appears with other Whose Line Is It Anyway? cast members in the improvisational segments.

Following the first live episode of The Drew Carey Show in 1999, which achieved high ratings, a second live episode was conceived in a bid to repeat that success and capitalise on the November sweeps ratings period. The producers also wanted to "push the envelope even further" than before, so they decided to keep many elements of the episode a secret from the cast. Improvisational segments were added to the basic plot, allowing the producers to throw the cast "a few curve balls". Executive producer Bruce Helford stated, "The actors don't know what's coming at them. They don't know what's behind every door."

Helford planned to bring in guest stars during the recordings, as well having the studio audiences come up with suggestions on how the episode should end, leaving the cast with little time to prepare before they act it out. Neil Conrad, the channel's Broadcast and Standard Practices editor, admitted that he was scared about the episode, especially after the first live broadcast, in which a guest cast member was caught with a handwritten message to his mother on his buttocks. Helford joked that Conrad had a right to be worried, but he also said that if the cast were to mess up, then it just adds to the fun.

As with the first live episode, the cast and crew performed "Drew Live II" three times for the Eastern/Central, Mountain and Pacific time zones. Several cast members from the improvisational comedy series Whose Line Is It Anyway? made guest appearances in the episode. Colin Mochrie once again reprised his role as Eugene, while Wayne Brady, Brad Sherwood, Charles Esten, Greg Proops, Kathy Greenwood and Laura Hall appeared in the various improv segments. Talk show host Jay Leno also makes a cameo appearance. To coincide with the episode, ABC planned to air live promos featuring actors coming by The Drew Carey Show studio to promote their ABC shows.

To prove to the viewers that the episode was live, some of the actors were seen watching and improvising the dialogue for that night's broadcast of Felicity, which aired in the same time slot on The WB. Helford had originally chosen an episode of The West Wing, but the show's producers rejected the idea and Felicity was chosen instead, as long as the actors did not make any jokes about Keri Russell's hairstyle. Felicity creator J. J. Abrams praised the segment, saying "The idea of characters on a live show tuning in to another network to see what's on was brilliant. My only hope is that it reminded people: 'What the hell am I doing not watching The WB?'"

== Reception ==
In its original broadcast, "Drew Live II" was watched by 15.2 million viewers, finishing in 22nd place in the ratings for the week of November 6–12, 2000. It was the sixth highest-rated show on ABC that week, following episodes of Who Wants to Be a Millionaire?, NFL Monday Night Football, The Practice, NFL Monday Showcase, and ABC's coverage of the presidential election.

A writer for Warner Bros. stated that the episode showed The Drew Carey Show was "one of the most consistently unique comedies on television", and that the show would "go where no other comedy has gone and put new twists on the series' second annual live episode". Joel Brown of The Spokesman-Review chose the episode as one of his television "Highlights" for November 8, 2000. Of the cast, he commented, "expect them all to crack themselves up, as usual". A critic for The Orlando Sentinel included the episode in the newspaper's "Prime Picks" feature, and commented that it was "a dangerously unpredictable episode."

Sandra P. Angulo from Entertainment Weekly included "Drew Live II" in her feature on "the splashier sweeps events" for the week, commenting "In what's becoming an annual event, Drew and company – including the improv aces from Whose Line Is It Anyway? – perform live for each of the three time zones. Basically, they have three chances to get it right." James Joyce, writing for the Newcastle Herald, noted that Carey had "always been willing to toy with the conventions of the sitcom format", and dubbed Oswald and Lewis his "dimwit buddies".

The Washington Post's Lisa de Moraes was not a fan of the live format, stating "Apparently no one at ABC watched last season's live, partially improvised Drew Carey train wreck, so they're allowing the producers to do it again." Allan Johnson for Chicago Tribune gave the episode a mention in his round up of the special episodes airing during November sweeps.

Production mixer Klaus Landsberg earned a Primetime Emmy Award nomination for Outstanding Multi-Camera Sound Mixing for a Series or a Special for his work on the episode.
