= MrsP.com =

Free children's entertainment website

MrsP.com is a free children's entertainment website. It stars actress Kathy Kinney as Mrs. P, a redheaded Irishwoman who reads classic children's stories from her "Magic Library." The target audience for the website is kids between the ages of 3-12, and its goal is to "encourage a lifetime love of reading." It has no advertising and no subscription fees. The site is produced by Mrs P Enterprises, LLC and was created by Kinney, who played Mimi on The Drew Carey Show, TV writer and producer Clay Graham, and former entertainment and New Media executive Dana Plautz.

== Content ==
The primary content offered on MrsP.com is a library of streaming video episodes. The episodes range in length from 5–30 minutes and feature the Mrs. P character seated near a fire in her "Magic Library." She offers a short, often humorous introduction, usually based on one of her youthful adventures and related in some way to the story she is about to read. She then reads the story directly to the camera. The videos include illustrations or photographs, but focus primarily on the emotive performances of the storyteller "in the hope that viewers will use their imaginations."

Stories read by Mrs. P on the website include Jack and the Beanstalk, Little Red Riding Hood, The Tale of Peter Rabbit and Sleeping Beauty. New stories are added every few weeks.

The site also features an animated game in which a stuffed dog, Spyri, comes to life, as well as a "window" in which various visitors appear, including actor Robert Blanche (World Trade Center, Ghost Whisperer) as a singing policeman trying to woo Mrs. P.

== History ==
Development of MrsP.com began in April 2007, when Clay Graham, who had been the head writer and an executive producer of The Drew Carey Show, first had the idea of creating a "storytelling" website. Dana Plautz, who had been a marketing executive at Hanna-Barbera, joined soon after as a partner and co-president, and they approached Kathy Kinney, who was their "first -- and only -- choice" to play Mrs. P. Kinney also is co-president and co-creator of the website.

The site launched at midnight on November 10, 2008. Its production offices are in Portland, Oregon and Los Angeles. Powell's Books, the world's largest independent bookstore, supports the site with a "Mrs. P Aisle" on its website, www.powells.com, and with other promotional activities.

Mrs. P made her first national TV appearance on Dec. 6, 2008 in a live broadcast from the Manhattan FAO Schwarz Toy Store for the CBS Early Show. She recommended her favorite children's books for the holiday season and read The Princess and the Pea to an audience of children.

On December 9, 2008, MrsP.com began offering videos from its library for purchase and download on the iTunes Store. Ten percent of all MrsP.com's after-tax profits will be donated by Mrs P Enterprises, LLC to literacy organizations.

Mrs. P made an appearance at the Los Angeles Times Festival of Books, the nation's largest book fair, on April 25, 2009. She read to a crowd of several hundred children and parents from the Target-sponsored Children's Stage.

On April 27, 2009, MrsP.com won the National Parenting Center Seal of Approval. In its review, the Center called the website "beautifully conceived" and "beautifully rendered," adding that "the site felt extremely genuine in its desire to help children develop a love of reading and did so by creating a fun environment for them" in which to be read to.

TeachersFirst.com, a website resource "by teacher, for teachers" reviewed MrsP.com in May, 2009, stating "You almost want to toast marshmallows on the open fire as you cyber-curl under Mrs. P's feet by the fireplace." The teacher's website also said MrsP.com "will thrill your eager readers for hours" - although warning "do not even try this one on a slow connection."

On May 27, 2009, MrsP.com was chosen by the American Library Association as one of its "Great Web Sites for Kids."
