= Pilot (The Drew Carey Show) =

- The Drew Carey Show episode
- Episode no.: Season 1 Episode 1
- Directed by: Michael Lessac
- Written by: Drew Carey; Bruce Helford
- Production code: 475095
- Original air date: September 13, 1995

Guest appearances
- Kathy Kinney as Mimi Bobeck; Alaina Reed Hall as Lois; Ian Gomez as Larry Almada; David St. James as Carpool Guy #1; Lauren Katz as Waitress; Vic Helford as Guy #1; Natasha Silver as Natalie

Episode chronology
← Previous —	Next → "Miss Right"

"Pilot" is the first episode and the series premiere of the American sitcom The Drew Carey Show. It first aired on September 13, 1995, on the ABC network in the United States. The premise of the show revolves around the life Drew Carey would have lived if he had not become a stand-up comedian. The pilot introduces the main characters of Drew (Carey), Kate (Christa Miller), Lewis (Ryan Stiles) and Oswald (Diedrich Bader), as well as Drew's workplace, the fictional Winfred-Lauder department store, and enemy Mimi Bobeck (Kathy Kinney).

The pilot was written by series co-creators Carey and Bruce Helford, while Michael Lessac directed. It was shot in April 1995 at the Warner Bros. Television studios in Burbank, California. The episode ranked joint 29th in television programs with the most viewers for the week of September 11–17, 1995. Critical response was mixed, with many comparing the show to the NBC sitcom Friends. Ray Richmond from the Los Angeles Daily News praised Carey's performance, but thought the episode did not click, while Variety's Tony Scott liked the opening sequence and Lessac's "inventive" direction.

== Plot ==
The episode opens with Drew and his friends Lewis Kiniski and Oswald Lee Harvey in their local bar, the Warsaw Tavern, discussing Brad Pitt. The following day, Drew's best friend Kate O'Brien tells him that she has broken up with her boyfriend, who then fired her from her job as a receptionist at his body shop. Desperate for a job, Kate asks Drew to hire her at the Winfred-Louder department store where he is the assistant director of personnel. Drew insists that he cannot hire his friends. At Winfred-Louder, Drew's boss Mr. Bell asks him to hire someone for a position at the cosmetics counter. While conducting interviews, Drew meets Mimi Bobeck, a hostile woman who wears too much eye shadow. Drew tries to be polite, but Mimi soon realizes he is not going to give her the job and accuses Drew of being sexist. Mimi complains to Mr. Bell about Drew, getting him into trouble.

Later at the Warsaw Tavern, Drew is hanging out with his friends when Mimi walks in and confronts him. Drew talks to her honestly about why she did not get the job, telling her that her attitude is the problem and she has to deal with the fact that her looks might stop her from getting some jobs. Mimi does not like Drew's advice and leaves the bar. Needing to fill the cosmetics position quickly, Drew believes he has found an ideal candidate in Natalie until Kate turns up to apply for the job. Drew admits that he is worried that Kate will hate him if he has to fire her. However, Mr. Bell insists Drew hire Kate, having seen her in the lobby and Drew agrees. Kate later comes to Drew's house to ask him, Lewis and Oswald, which perfume samples to promote. The episode ends with Drew playing pool in his garden in the rain, while the others watch through the window.

== Production ==
=== Conception and writing ===
"It's a weird feeling, doing a television pilot. Especially if you're the star and co-creator like I was. It's like it's all on your head if it fails. I felt like if it failed, Bruce Helford (who I wrote it with) would get another writing job with no problem, but what would happen to me?"

— Carey on his fears that the pilot would not sell.

Drew Carey and Bruce Helford co-created The Drew Carey Show. Having worked together twice before on The Good Life and Someone Like Me, Carey joined up with Helford and told him he wanted to develop his own show. They each came up with various ideas and created The Drew Carey Show. Carey later told a group of television critics at the network launch that the series was originally going to be called The Drew F...ing Carey Show, saying "We were going to call it The Drew F. Carey Show and see if anybody at home could figure it out!"

The show revolved around the life Carey would have lived if he had not become a stand-up comedian. Carey told Helford that he thought he would have been employed in a mid-level management job, which was a relatable job for most Americans at the time. Carey wanted a show that was about regular people. He also wanted to set the show in Cleveland as it was his hometown and it was not getting a lot of attention. Carey and Helford drove to the city together in January 1995 to do some research. They toured the local bars to try to get the right look for the show's bar the Warsaw Tavern. Carey and Helford also heard the song "Moon Over Parma" in one of the bars and it was used during the title sequence.

Carey and Helford co-wrote the pilot episode together. Helford had expected The Drew Carey Show to air at 8:30pm. When ABC placed the show in the 7:30 pm slot, Helford agreed to soften the language in the pilot. An executive from Standards and Practices had asked for nine words deemed offensive to be removed from the script, as well as a mention of Jack Daniel's and a line that implied one of the characters was going to buy and use drugs.

=== Casting ===
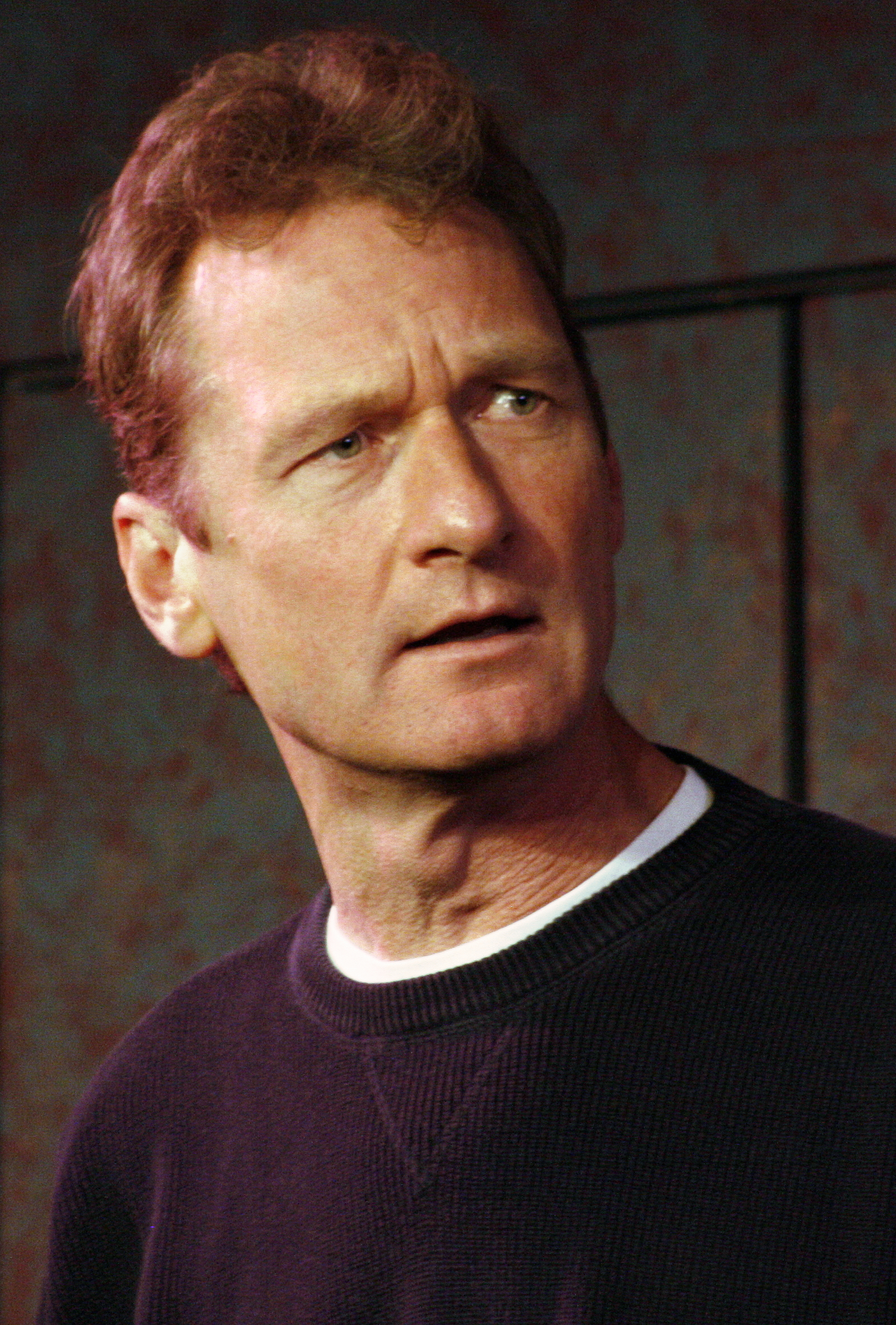
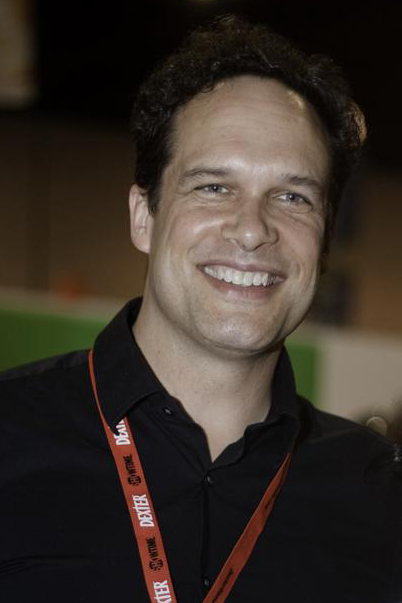
Ryan Stiles (left) and Diedrich Bader (right) were cast as Lewis and Oswald respectively.

Carey plays a fictionalized version of himself. Drew is an assistant director of personnel at the Winfred-Lauder department store. Carey explained "I wanted a white-collar job with no authority and a bad boss. Someone to do all the work and get no credit. He could've worked in a bank, in insurance." Carey said it was "a no-brainer" on settling on the character, saying "It's just me." While Christa Miller was trying out for the role of Drew's close friend Kate O'Brien, ABC thought she might be too inexperienced for the role and they asked to see her appearance in the Seinfeld episode "The Doodle". The episode had yet to be aired and Miller had to beg the show's co-creator Larry David for a rough cut to show to ABC. Miller went on to secure the role of Kate and Helford considered her to be the only person right for the role.

Ryan Stiles won the role of "hapless janitor" Lewis Kiniski. Despite being well known for his role on the British improv comedy show Whose Line Is It Anyway?, Stiles still had to go through the audition process along with everybody else. He said, "I don't even think Drew was really even aware of Whose Line at that time because it hadn't been on the air (in the U.S.) that many years. I think it was only on Comedy Central at that time." Stiles admitted that he liked to have fun with his character and not psychoanalyze him. Following his appearance in The Beverly Hillbillies, Diedrich Bader realised he needed a regular income and decided to return to television. He tested out for The Drew Carey Show, but did not initially want to be cast in it. He told Kevin Smith that he wanted to drive up his price for the pilot of Partners. Bader lost out on the role of Bob to Jon Cryer and then learned The Drew Carey Show wanted to hire him to play Oswald Lee Harvey.

The role of Mimi Bobeck went to Kathy Kinney. The actress was originally intended to be a one-episode guest star, but became a series regular when Helford noticed during editing of the pilot that the funniest scenes were those featuring Mimi. Kinney was hired for a further seven episodes, but eventually appeared in every episode. Robin Rauzi, writing for The Sun-Herald, branded Mimi "a moving visual assault with a personality to match" because of her painted-on eyebrows, bright eyeshadow and gaudy clothes. After relocating from Chicago, Ian Gomez spent a year auditioning for various shows, before being cast in the recurring role of Larry Almada in 1995. Other actors who appear in the pilot are Alaina Reed Hall, David St. James, Lauren Katz, Vic Helford and Natasha Silver.

=== Filming ===
The pilot was shot in April 1995 and directed by Michael Lessac. Although set in Cleveland, the show was actually filmed at the Warner Bros. Television studios in Burbank, California. Helford had noticed that the cast did not look at each other while saying their lines and he tried to encourage them to look at one another, so they would laugh. Helford told Lessac to bring the cast in on a weekend, where there was no pressure, so they could "goof around" and relax. Drew's job required him to work from a cubicle and Helford stated that no one had really done a show dealing with that situation, as producers and networks felt it was too confined. Helford disagreed and had a set where an accessible cubicle was the centerpiece designed and built. The Memphis Plaza Lounge in Old Brooklyn was the inspiration for the show's bar The Warsaw Tavern. The owner of the Lounge refused to sell the naming rights to Warner Bros, but he did agree that they could film the front of the building. The crew shot the building in 1995 and temporarily replaced The Memphis Plaza Lounge sign with their own Warsaw Tavern one. The sign was hung in the front window for two years before Warner Bros. took it down.

== Reception ==
The episode finished joint 29th among 108 prime-time shows in the Nielsen ratings for the week of September 11–17, 1995. It came second both in households and among adults 18–49 with a 10.8/18 and 7.2 rating/share, respectively.

"Pilot" received mixed reviews from television critics. Ray Richmond from the Los Angeles Daily News branded the show a "Friends clone", but praised Carey, calling him "the season's quirkiest, most uproarious talent". He also thought that he was "immensely lovable". Richmond added "The pilot never quite clicks, but you can feel the potential. And spread inside an Ellen/Grace Under Fire sandwich, it'll be difficult for it to miss." Lon Grahnke from the Chicago Sun-Times thought the show would be a "probable hit" based on the "Pilot". He also observed that the show is "a Cleveland variation of Friends, and thought the early time slot was a turn off, as it required the language to be toned-down. David Zurawik from The Baltimore Sun awarded the episode a C+ and branded it "a blue-collar Friends.

The Boston Globe's Frederic M. Biddle gave the episode one and a half stars and commented "Carey always keeps you watching, although he's always threatening to be funnier than he is. But more than any other Friends ripoff, this show's supporting actors slow down the central character – they're set decoration. Comic scenes involving the full cast build, then trip over themselves." Alan Pergament, writing for The Buffalo News, included The Drew Carey Show in his Top 10 new shows, noting "Carey is a lovable goof and his male buddy show has the chance of becoming the male version of Designing Women." Pergament cited the lack of prominent female characters and "a reliance on too many risque-language jokes" as the weaknesses of the show. The Washington Post's Tom Shales found the episode funny, adding "The Drew Carey Show bucks all the prevailing sitcom trends and does it endearingly."

Tony Scott, a critic for Variety, thought the characters were "amiable enough", but they needed "sharper dialogue and fresher observations." Scott did not think the carpool segment worked, but he liked the opening sequence in the bar. He also praised Lessac's direction, calling it "inventive". Peter Weiniger from The Age was prepared to give the series a chance based on the episode, saying "Like most American sitcoms, The Drew Carey Show has its share of snappy one-liners but it gives the impression of trying a little too hard. To be fair, this is the first of a series, and we have yet to see the characters develop. Even Seinfeld took a little time to become essential viewing."
