= Miss P =

Miss P may refer to:

- Tashtins Lookin For Trouble (also known as Miss P), a dog
- "Miss P." (song), 2003 song by Cherish

== See also ==
- Little Miss P, Japanese manga series by Ken Koyama, and the main character of the series
- Ranking Miss P (born 1959), British radio presenter and DJ
- MrsP.com, a free children's entertainment website
