= Lenny the Wonder Dog =

- DVD cover art as Lenny the Wonder Dog
- Directed by: Oren Goldman; Stav Ozdoba
- Screenplay by: Oren Goldman; Stav Ozdoba
- Story by: Michael Winslow
- Produced by: B. Billie Greif
- Starring: Sammy Kahn; Joe Morton; Andy Richter; Craig Ferguson; Kathy Kinney
- Cinematography: Guy Livneh
- Edited by: Yoram Tal
- Music by: Tulio Cremisini
- Production company: Winslow Productions
- Distributed by: North by Northwest Entertainment
- Release dates: 2004: December 5, 2005 (Hungarian television)
- Running time: 80 minutes
- Country: United States
- Language: English

Lenny the Wonder Dog is a 2005 American comedy film about a dog named Lenny, directed by Oren Goldman from a screenplay written by Michael Winslow, and filmed on locations in Florida. The cast included many prominent actors and celebrities such as Craig Ferguson and Andy Richter as the voice of Lenny. The movie had television release in Europe and after video release received generally poor reviews.

The film is notable for being one of Oscar Isaac's earliest roles.

== Plot ==
Doctor Island has invented a computer microchip he plans to use to train dogs instantly. However, his former colleague, Doctor Wagner, has other plans for the microchip: he wants to implant copies in every child in order to brainwash them to come work for him after they turn 18, and be exceedingly loyal.

In the fight between Doctor Island and Doctor Wagner's henchmen, Hanky, Panky, and Doctor Island get injured and his dog Lenny is injected with the computer microchip. On the run, Lenny finds his brainpower growing. And when he finds a young boy, Zach, to be his friend and savior, Lenny discovers he can talk. Lenny (continually amazed by the new powers the embedded microchip keeps giving him), Zach (full of unrequited love for longtime friend Becky), and school newspaper reporter Becky (out to write the story of the century) team up with downtrodden police officer John Wyndham to defeat Dr. Wagner and his henchmen.

The showdown culminates at the school concert given by Pop Star Angie, where Zach's inspiring speech and Lenny's audio powers combine to incriminate Doctor Wagner, who is arrested by the police chief, now appreciative of Officer Wyndham's talents for police-work and crime-solving.

== Cast ==
- Sammy Kahn as Zach
- Joe Morton as Dr. Island
- Andy Richter as the voice of Lenny
- Craig Ferguson as Dr. Richard Wagner
- Kathy Kinney as Lisa Lathers
- Michael Winslow as John Wyndham
- Jeff Chase as Panky
- Evan Adams as Razel
- Paola Turbay as Mrs. Ripley
- Camila Banus as Rainbow
- Oscar Isaac as Detective Fartman
- Stephanie Sherrin as Becky
- Andrew Shaifer as Hanky
- "Boomer" as Lenny
- Rus Blackwell as Harley
- Jeffrey William Evans as Chief Greenwald
- Damaris Justamante as Mayor Jenkins
- Maria de los Angeles Monasterio as Angie
- P.C. Martinez as Bodyguard
- Graham Purdy as Jeremy
- Roberto Smith as Henry

== Release ==
Filmed at locations in Florida under the working title of A Dog and his Boy, the film had its first television release December 5, 2005 in Hungary as Lenny, a Csodakutya, followed by screening in Germany as Lenny, der Wunderhund, in Finland as Lenny ihmekoira, and in France as Lenny le chien parlant. Later French DVD release was as Lenny Wonderdog. DVD releases include by North by Northwest Entertainment in 2005, Third Millennium in 2006, Boulevard Entertainment in 2007, and Peace Arch Trinity in 2008.

== Reception ==
Lenny the Wonder Dog has received generally negative reviews. Common Sense Media panned the film giving it one star and writing "a baffling plot, cheap special effects, the repetitious chase scenes, and overall silliness make this movie almost unwatchable for adults", adding "though kids might find the visual jokes and pratfalls hilarious, the film sets the quality bar at a very low level." They also offered that Craig Ferguson's performance as the megalomaniacal Dr. Richard Wagner, "is so over-the-top it could become a career landmark."

The Dove Foundation criticized the language used in the film as non-family friendly, writing "Although this is an off-the-wall comedy that is geared toward the family, it cannot be family approved due to some language issues."

Florida real estate developer Jeff Sherrin "politely but abruptly shrugs off" any question about the film. His daughter, Stephanie Sherrin, appeared in this film as well as in Kids in America.
