= The Ride Down Mt. Morgan =

Play written by Arthur Miller

Penguin Books edition with (left to right) Frances Conroy, Patrick Stewart, and Katy Selverstone

The Ride Down Mt. Morgan is a play by Arthur Miller.

== Plot ==
The play's central character is Lyman Felt, an insurance agent and bigamist who maintains families in New York City and Elmira in upstate New York. When he is hospitalized following a nearly fatal car crash on an icy mountain road, both wives—the prim and proper Theo, to whom he's been wed for more than thirty years, and the younger, more assertive Leah, whom he married nine years earlier—show up at his bedside. When confronted with his duplicity, Felt states that the two options in life are to be true to others (and to what he deems a hypocritical society) or to himself, and that he has chosen the latter. He justifies his actions to both shocked women by explaining he has given them good lives, has supported them financially and emotionally, and has been a good father. He goes on to say that the two women have been happier with this arrangement than they would have been if they had each been his only wife. As reasons for this he cites domestic boredom, routine, and the angst of being trapped in the same relationship forever. The play uses flashbacks to show previous situations both families have lived.

Doubts linger about the crash having been an accident, and some characters start suspecting it was an attempted suicide, maybe motivated by Felt's growing discomfort about his unusual family arrangement. The flip side of the wives' ostensible faultless lifestyle is also presented, when it is suggested that Leah has been involved in another relationship, and Theo admits to having experienced long spells of being cold and sexless. Every character starts having to deal with their own hypocrisy, even Felt's outraged business partners who are later discovered to keep lovers.

== Original Broadway cast ==
- Patrick Stewart as Lyman Felt, protagonist; husband of Theo and Leah; father of Bessie and Benjamin.
- Frances Conroy as Theo, married to Lyman for 30 years, mother of Bessie.
- Shannon Burkett as Bessie, Lyman and Theo's adult daughter
- Oni Faida Lampley as Nurse Logan
- Katy Selverstone as Leah, married to Lyman for 9 years, mother of Benjamin
- John C. Vennema as Tom, Lyman's lawyer
- Portia Johnson as Hospital Staff/Dream Figure
- Terry Layman as Hospital Staff/Dream Figure
- Jennifer Piech as Hospital Staff/Dream Figure
- Sherry Skinker as Hospital Staff/Dream Figure

== Production ==
The play, directed by Michael Blakemore and starring Tom Conti, had its world premiere at London's Wyndham's Theatre, opening on October 23, 1991.

Seven years later, it received its first New York City staging in a production directed by David Esbjornson, which opened on October 27, 1998, at the Public Theater, where it ran for 40 performances. The cast included Patrick Stewart, Katy Selverstone, and Frances Conroy, who won the Outer Critics Circle Award for her performance.

== Controversy ==
After 23 previews, the Public production opened on April 9, 2000, at Broadway's Ambassador Theatre, where it ran for 121 performances. Lukewarm reviews and poor box office convinced the producers (including the Shubert Organization) to post a closing notice and, in memorably impassioned Saturday matinee and evening curtain speeches, Stewart accused them of not being supportive, stating "Arthur Miller and I no longer have confidence in our producers' commitment to promote and publicize this extraordinarily provocative and vastly entertaining play." They subsequently took the matter to Actors Equity, which ruled that Stewart had to apologize publicly for his outburst.

== Nominations ==
- Tony Award for Best Play
- Tony Award for Best Featured Actress in a Play (Conroy)
- Drama Desk Award for Outstanding Play
- Drama Desk Award for Outstanding Actor in a Play (Stewart)
