= Katy Selverstone =

American actress

- Born: New York City, New York, U.S.
- Years active: 1992–2012

Katy Selverstone (born in New York City) is an American actress. She is primarily known for her work on The Drew Carey Show as Lisa Robbins, Drew Carey's girlfriend in the first and second seasons.

== Life and career ==
Selverstone was born in New York City, New York, on February 4, 1966. She attended Scranton Central High School (Scranton, Pennsylvania) and Carnegie Mellon University and earned a BFA in acting.

Selverstone has worked on such high-profile television series as NYPD Blue, CSI and As The World Turns and has appeared in the films Divine Secrets of the Ya-Ya Sisterhood and South of Pico. She portrayed FBI agent Nancy Floyd in The Path to 9/11. She received the Grand Jury choice for Best Actress in a Feature for her role as "Una" in Laura Nix's film short The Politics of Fur.

Her other work includes playing Darlene, the receptionist at Gramercy Press, a fictional publishing company used in Network MCI commercials in 1994 and 1995. Selverstone also appeared on The L Word, Nip/Tuck and Seinfeld in the episode "The Face Painter" as Siena, George Costanza's girlfriend, who in response to George saying "I love you" responded, "I know, I heard you the first time."

In 2000, Selverstone appeared on Broadway in Arthur Miller's play The Ride Down Mt. Morgan with actor Patrick Stewart for which she received a Fany award for Outstanding Broadway Debut.

== Film ==
Year	Title	Role	Notes
1998	Letters from a Killer	FBI agent Singleton	
2002	Divine Secrets of the Ya-Ya Sisterhood	Younger Caro	
2002	The Politics of Fur	Una	
2007	South of Pico	Maureen	

== Television ==
Year	Title	Role	Episode
1994	Homicide: Life on the Street	Angela Frandina	A Many Splendored Thing
1994	Loving	Susie	Episode #1
1995	Seinfeld	Siena	The Face Painter
1996	The Drew Carey Show	Lisa Robbins	16 Episodes
1996	Chicago Sons	Kristen	A Foursome Is Not Necessarily a Good Thing
1997	C-16: FBI	Valerie Tulli	3 Episodes
1998	L.A. Doctors	Leslie Weiss	Classic Evan
1998	Holding the Baby	Roxanne	The Gay Divorcee
1998	Dawson's Creek	Pam the Bride	A Perfect Wedding
2000	Law & Order: Special Victims Unit	Emily Shore	Entitled
2000	Strong Medicine	Patty Roland	Side Effects
2000	Grounded for Life	Abby	Eddie's Dead
2000	It's Like, You Know...	Pamela Merriweather	Trading Places
2000	Emeril	Christy	Fifteen Minutes
2003	NYPD Blue	Adrian Caffee	2 Episodes
2003	Nip/Tuck	Devon Greco	Cara Fitzgerald
2004	The Handler	Rhonda Ledingham	Give Daddy Some Sugar
2004	CSI: Crime Scene Investigation	Amber Hamshaw	Ch-Ch-Changes
2005	The L Word	Phoebe Sparkle	Land Ahoy
2005	CSI: Miami	Michelle Day	Vengeance
2005	Ghost Whisperer	Fran Vaughn	Homecoming
2006	Medium	Marilyn Downey	Raising Cain
2006	Without a Trace	Nadine Jameson	The Road Home
2006	The Path to 9/11	Nancy Floyd	2 Episodes
2006	Twenty Good Years	Kristin	Sorry, Wrong Ship
2010	Law & Order	Emily Shore	2 Episodes
2010	As the World Turns	Francoise Pacaud	4 Episodes
2012	Leverage	Eleanor Gault	The Frame-Up Job

== Stage ==
Year	Title	Role	Theater
2000	The Ride Down Mt. Morgan	Leah	Ambassador Theatre
