= Clay Graham =

American screenwriter

- Born: May 5, 1959 (age 66); Phoenix, Arizona, U.S.
- Occupations: comedy writer, television producer
- Years active: 1979-present
- Website: Mrs. P's Magic Library

Clay Graham (born May 5, 1959) is an American comedy writer, television producer and website creator, best known for his work on The Drew Carey Show and the Netflix series Santa Clarita Diet.

== Early years ==
Born in Phoenix, Arizona, Graham began writing comedy in high school, selling material to humorist Robert Orben for seven dollars a joke. While still in college, he wrote for Mad magazine, creating scripts for artist Don Martin.

== Writing career ==
Soon after graduation, Graham was hired as a writer on the sitcom Benson.

After this, he worked as a writer and producer on the last three seasons of the long-running ABC comedy, Who's the Boss?. During this period, Graham wrote "The All-Nighter," an episode still somewhat controversial among fans of the sitcom because of its relatively dark themes.

In 1995, Graham became the head writer and an executive producer of The Drew Carey Show. He remained on the show for eight of its nine seasons, producing more than 200 episodes. He produced and helped write many of the series' trademark musical numbers, as well as its annual "live" broadcasts. Graham wrote "Something Wick This Way Comes," the second episode of the second season, which introduced the character Nigel Wick (Craig Ferguson), who became a series regular for 185 episodes. In 1998, Graham and Drew Carey took a small production crew overseas and became the first Americans to film a sitcom in China, using locations such as The Great Wall and the Beijing McDonald's.

In April 2009, TBS announced at its upfront that it was developing a prime-time, animated comedy series with Graham called "Big Tow."

The New York Times published an essay by Graham in its Modern Love column on July 8, 2010, titled "What Clown Wrote This Script?' detailing Graham's relationship with an unnamed actress for whom he developed a TV pilot a decade earlier. Although comic in tone, the essay explores Graham's inner struggles about mixing business and romance and ends on a bittersweet note.

Graham has written humor pieces for the Huffington Post, including "Heaven Is For Real - and Overrated" in 2014, and "Trump: Already Our Best President," a satirical essay encouraging President Trump to resign one week after his inauguration in 2017.

In 2011–12, Graham became a consulting producer on the NBC sitcom, Are You There, Chelsea?, based on the life and writing of Chelsea Handler. He adapted an essay titled "Doctor, Doctor" from Handler's book My Horizontal Life into the episode, "The Gynecologist," which aired on February 8, 2012.

Graham co-wrote with comic-actress Ali Wong a segment of the experimental Fox Shortcoms Comedy Hour for the Fox network in 2013, with other segments written by and starring Kevin Smith and Neal Brennan, among others.

The Independent Film Channel announced in April, 2016 it was developing a dark comedy created by and to be executive produced by Graham and actors Bryan Cranston and Steven Weber, that would star Weber. Todd Barth Can Help You, written by Graham, focussed on a mild-mannered insurance adjuster whose life and self-perception are drastically changed by a seemingly religious experience.

Graham was a writer and consulting producer on the first two seasons of the original Netflix series, Santa Clarita Diet, starring Drew Barrymore and Timothy Olyphant, which premiered in 2017. He became an executive producer in Season 3, which received a 100% Fresh Rating on Rotten Tomatoes. Graham wrote five episodes of the critically acclaimed comedy-horror series, including the season finale of the first season.

== Website ==
In 2007, Graham began developing MrsP.com, a new entertainment website for children. Co-created with Kathy Kinney, who played "Mimi" on The Drew Carey Show and who also stars as "Mrs. P" in the site, and Dana Plautz, a former executive with Hanna-Barbera and Intel, the comic website celebrates reading and launched on November 10, 2008.

In 2009, the website launched a national writing contest for kids. The winners' stories were illustrated by professional artists and read in online videos by Mrs. P. The website held its 10th annual writing contest in 2019 and announced it would be the final contest.

Since the website's founding, Mrs. P has also connected via Skype and Google Hangouts to classrooms across the country, reaching thousands of students and promoting literacy.
