= The Drew Carey Show =

American television sitcom (1995–2004)

- Genre: Sitcom
- Created by: Drew Carey; Bruce Helford
- Starring: Drew Carey; Diedrich Bader; Christa Miller; Ryan Stiles; Kathy Kinney; Craig Ferguson; John Carroll Lynch; Cynthia Watros
- Music by: W. G. Snuffy Walden
- Opening theme: "Moon Over Parma" performed by Drew Carey (1995–96) and various artists (2002–04); "Five O'Clock World" performed by The Vogues (1996–97) and various artists (2002–04); "Cleveland Rocks" performed by The Presidents of the United States of America (1997–2002) and various artists (2002–04)
- Country of origin: United States
- Original language: English
- No. of seasons: 9
- No. of episodes: 233 (list of episodes)

Production
- Executive producers: Bruce Helford; Drew Carey; Deborah Oppenheimer; Clay Graham; Richard Day; Bruce Rasmussen; Robert Borden; Holly Hester; Les Firestein; Mike Teverbaugh; Dave Caplan; Dan O'Keefe; Russ Woody
- Producers: Deborah Oppenheimer; Rick Messina; Richard Baker; Lou Fusaro; Holly Sawyer-Friedman
- Cinematography: Ken Lamkin (pilot); Joe Pennella (season 1); Peter Smokler (seasons 2–9)
- Editors: Richard A. Schwadel; Brian K. Roberts; John Fuller; Larry Harris
- Camera setup: Film; Multi-camera; Single-camera (partially season 9)
- Running time: 18–21 minutes
- Production companies: Mohawk Productions; Warner Bros. Television

Original release
- Network: ABC
- Release: September 13, 1995 – September 8, 2004

The Drew Carey Show is an American television sitcom that aired on ABC from September 13, 1995, to September 8, 2004. Set in Cleveland, Ohio, the series revolved around the retail office and home life of "everyman" Drew Carey, a fictionalized version of the comedian.

The show was created by Carey, who had both stand-up comedy and writing experience, and television writer and producer Bruce Helford.

Produced by Mohawk Productions in association with Warner Bros. Television, it debuted on September 13, 1995, received positive reviews from critics and ranked among the Top 30 programs for four seasons before sliding in popularity. Ratings declined sharply during the final two seasons, and the last two episodes aired on September 8, 2004.

== Premise ==
The main cast of the series (seasons 6–7).

The character portrayed by Drew Carey shares his name and is a fictionalized version of himself, a self-proclaimed "everyman." Carey has explained that his character is what he would have been if he had not become an actor. He has a core group of friends who embark with him on his everyday trials and tribulations. Drew's friends include erudite but unambitious Lewis (Ryan Stiles), excitable dimwitted Oswald (Diedrich Bader), and his friend (later on-off girlfriend) Kate (Christa Miller) who is tomboyish. In the final two seasons, Kate gets married and moves to Guam. The same two-part episode also introduces and develops Drew's relationship with Kellie (Cynthia Watros), which carries on over the final two seasons.

For its first seven seasons, Drew's workplace is the office of fictional Cleveland department store Winfred-Louder where he has worked for years and still works as assistant director of personnel. One of his coworkers is Mimi Bobeck (Kathy Kinney), an overweight woman with a clownish wardrobe, a lot of make-up (including her trademark bright blue eye shadow), and a foul mutual dislike for Drew. The two eventually become closer (although still maintaining a less heated rivalry), primarily because Mimi fell in love with and married Drew's cross-dressing heterosexual brother Steve (John Carroll Lynch), a frequently recurring character.

In the first season they work for the unseen Mr. Bell (Kevin Pollak), only seen in the season one finale, when he is greeted with applause; in later seasons, their boss and sometimes-co-worker is Nigel Wick (Craig Ferguson), an eccentric, sadistic, and unlucky Englishman. In the final two seasons, they work for peaceful, hippie-like Evan (Kyle Howard) and the much more professional Scott (Jonathan Mangum), tech-smart but naïve twenty-somethings who own the Neverending Store, an online retailer with offices in the same location.

In addition to his day job, Drew, along with Oswald, Lewis, and Kate (replaced from around Season 5 onwards by Mimi), runs a small business out of his garage selling Buzz Beer, a caffeinated alcoholic drink. It becomes popular in the region and is served at the group's hangout, The Warsaw Tavern.

== Synopsis ==
=== Season 1 (1995–1996) ===
The first season's opening credits consisted of a caricature of Carey's face wearing a yellow tie—singing the Robert McGuire-penned "Moon Over Parma." The song was trimmed for the opening sequence, and the reference to Eastlake in the line "Guide her to Eastlake underneath your silvery light" was changed to a reference to Cleveland to stay in theme with the show.

In the first season, Drew and Mimi worked under Mr. Bell, who existed only as a voice on Drew's speakerphone, excluding the season finale (his final episode, played by Kevin Pollak) wherein he is fired by Winfred-Louder's new owners. Other characters that appeared exclusively in this period were Drew's hillbilly neighbor Jules and his family. Drew's first girlfriend Lisa was introduced in this season, as was Jay, Kate's love interest who used to attend the same high school as Drew and his friends. Both characters lasted until Season 2, where they were quickly written out of the show in the early episodes.

Nine of the episode titles were related to chemistry in some way, with names such as "The Joining of Two Unlike Elements Is a Mixture" and "Isomers Have Distinct Characteristics". However, this theme was abandoned by the end of the season.

=== Seasons 2–7 (1996–2002) ===
"Moon Over Parma" was phased out during the second season by "Five O'Clock World" sung by The Vogues. This season introduced openings that paid homage to music videos which included the cast dancing and singing around the various sets of the show.

In the third season, the opening theme was changed to "Cleveland Rocks", a cover of an Ian Hunter song performed by The Presidents of the United States of America. The video, first shown in full in episode three that season, consists of shots of Cleveland. This change lasted until the second "wave" of the show ended, with the finale of Season 7.

The man who took over Mr. Bell's job after his firing was Nigel Wick, who served as a foil for both Drew and Mimi in the workplace. During this period, Drew and Mr. Wick also periodically took the top management job away from each other. This would usually result in Drew ending up back at his old job as assistant director of Personnel and Mr. Wick would miraculously retain his job as manager. By the end of Season 7, they were both Co-Managers before Winfred-Louder was closed down (albeit after undergoing drastic changes to stay in business). A recurring subplot involved Drew and his friends running a side business called "Buzz Beer," a microbrewery conceived through the concept of mixing coffee and beer. While several brand concepts and promotional stunts were plotted by Drew and his friends, their product failed to gain any true notoriety.

Kate and Oswald became closer and eventually became romantically involved and almost married during the third season, but Kate stood Oswald up at the altar. Kate and Drew also became romantically involved and were on the verge of getting married, but they called it off when they realized they did not feel the same about the prospect of children. Drew's cross-dressing brother Steve was introduced during this period. He eventually fell in love with Mimi and they had a child together, Gus (whose name was decided by means of a contest).

Drew also got married a number of times during this portion of the show. His first marriage was to Diane, a cocktail waitress in Las Vegas. This was only temporary however, as she needed Drew to retain custody of her children. His second marriage was to Mr. Wick, who forced Drew to marry him in a sham same-sex civil union in Vermont (the only place it was legal at the time) in hopes that the marriage would placate the Immigration and Naturalization Service. At the beginning of Season 7, Drew married both Nikki and Kate (the former had been a recurring character for some time since Season 3, and suffered from weight problems). They found out about this and all three of these marriages ended in divorce, and Drew became known as the "Impotent Bisexual Bigamist". Nikki eventually returned, and the actress, Kate Walsh, donned a fat suit again and moved in with Drew.

During this period the show also had frequent "event" episodes. Recurring themes were "What's Wrong with This Episode?", in which the show contained numerous deliberate continuity errors and other mistakes and invited viewers at home to find the most errors and win a prize, and live episodes, with loose plots and improvised scenes featuring cast members from Carey's improvisational comedy show Whose Line Is It Anyway? (Brad Sherwood, Wayne Brady, Colin Mochrie, Greg Proops, Charles Esten, Kathy Greenwood, Jeff Davis, Laura Hall, and Linda Taylor) contributed to these episodes, with Brad Sherwood hosting.

=== Seasons 8–9 (2002–2004) ===
Beginning in season 8, the show rotated through 9 different opening sequences, each of which contained a new version of one of the show's three theme songs. Each theme ("Moon Over Parma", "Five O'Clock World" and "Cleveland Rocks") was seen in three different segments, in new, wildly different arrangements. The show eventually went back to having just five main characters, akin to the first season, as Kate, Mr. Wick, and Steve were essentially written out of the show. Kate's character was married off, Mr. Wick disappeared after three appearances until the Season 8 finale, wherein it is revealed he became a weatherman (although he continued to appear in the opening credits, unlike Kate, who was eliminated, and never mentioned again.) Steve left at the beginning of the ninth season to "find himself". While Kate O'Brien never reappears after she is married off, Steve and Mr. Wick each briefly reappear late in Season 9.

With Winfred-Louder closed, the location became the office of online retailer Neverending Store. Drew, Mimi, and Mr. Wick were hired as employees of the new company. Mimi was hired first in a similar role to her old job, and Drew was eventually hired as "Internal Expediting Analyst", and a recurring gag began wherein Drew had no clue as to what his job entailed. Before being written out, Mr. Wick was at first a janitor, and another recurring joke came in the form of Mr. Wick attempting to climb the ladder back to being the boss. Before being written out, he went from janitor to the carrier of the dessert trolley.

Kate left after the first two episodes of season 8, the same two episodes that introduced Kellie, an old high school friend of Drew's who had been working as a stripper. She eventually became a waitress at The Warsaw Tavern, Drew's girlfriend, and the carrier of his child. The plot of the final episode was Drew and Kellie attempting to get married before their child is born. Mr. Wick also returned and stayed on for the series finale.

The show began featuring cameos from reality-TV participants in the final two seasons, such as former Road Rules star Timmy Beggy, The Real World alumna Cara Khan, and The Amazing Race winner Reichen Lehmkuhl. Tony the Bus Driver (Bill Cobbs) became a regular, serving as smart-alecky "bartender" type to whom Drew could tell his problems. The eighth season was put in a timeslot that frequently clashed with Monday Night Football. It was pulled mid-season and the remaining episodes were shown during the summer of 2003. The ninth season did not air until the summer of 2004, with most of the episodes out of order.

The last season's tone changed radically from the previous seasons. The directors began experimenting with one-camera set-ups, showing the sets completely built, with four walls in most rooms, and with rooms actually linked together. The writers also began experimenting, including story lines in which Gus burns down Mimi's house, forcing her to move in with Drew after Steve leaves her.

=== Post-series ===
On March 24, 2009, Kathy Kinney appeared in character as Mimi Bobeck at the beginning of The Late Late Show with Craig Ferguson. Kinney also appeared as Mimi twice on The Price Is Right on April Fools' Day; Drew Carey has been the host of the show since 2007.

As part of a 2014 April Fools' Day prank by CBS, Drew Carey and Craig Ferguson swapped hosting duties, leaving Craig to host The Price Is Right and Drew to host The Late Late Show with Craig Ferguson. The ending skit of the final episode of The Late Late Show in 2014 was a spoof of the 1990 final episode of Newhart, in which Ferguson and Carey reprised their roles. Mr. Wick wakes up in bed with Carey, discovering that his decade as a talk show host and Carey's career as a game show host had been a dream.

Carey, Kinney, and Ryan Stiles all guest starred in the episode "Bigger Kids, Bigger Problems" (2019) of the ABC sitcom American Housewife, which stars Diedrich Bader.

== Cast and characters ==
=== Main characters ===
Actor	Character	Role	Years	Seasons									Episodes
Actor	Character	Role	Years	1	2	3	4	5	6	7	8	9	Episodes
Drew Carey	Drew Allison Carey	Assistant Director of Personnel	1995–2004	Main	Main	Main	Main	Main	Main	Main	Main	Main	233
Diedrich Bader	Oswald Lee Harvey	Delivery Man/Trainee Nurse	1995–2004	Main	Main	Main	Main	Main	Main	Main	Main	Main	233
Christa Miller	Kate O'Brien	Cosmetic Saleswoman/Rock and Roll Hall of Fame	1995–2002	Main	Main	Main	Main	Main	Main	Main	Main ^{1}		184
Ryan Stiles	Lewis Kiniski	Janitor at DrugCo.	1995–2004	Main	Main	Main	Main	Main	Main	Main	Main	Main	224
Kathy Kinney	Mimi Bobeck	P.A./Floor Manager	1995–2004	Main^{2}									232
Craig Ferguson	Nigel Algernon Wick	Manager of Winfred-Louder	1996–2003, 2004		Main	Main	Main	Main	Main	Main	Main ^{3}	Guest	170
John Carroll Lynch	Steve Carey	Cosmetics Salesman/Stay-At-Home Husband	1998–2004			Recurring	Recurring	Recurring	Main	Main	Main ^{4}	Guest	73
Cynthia Watros	Kellie Newmark	Waitress	2002–2004								Main	Main	52

==== Notes ====
1. Christa Miller only appeared in the first and second episodes in Season 8.
2. Kathy Kinney is credited as a guest star in the pilot episode, but she is credited as starring from the second episode on.
3. Craig Ferguson was credited as starring in all episodes of Season 8, but only appeared in 4 episodes.
4. John Carroll Lynch appeared in 8 episodes in Season 8, and was only credited as starring for the episodes in which he appeared.

=== Recurring characters ===
Actor	Character	Role	Years	Seasons									Episodes
Actor	Character	Role	Years	1	2	3	4	5	6	7	8	9	Episodes
Ian Gomez	Larry Almada	Worked at Winfred-Louder/Matchmaker	1995–1999, 2002–2004	Recurring	Recurring	Recurring	Recurring				Recurring	Recurring	38
Jane Morris	Nora	Co-worker at Winfred-Louder	1995–2002, 2004	Recurring	Recurring		Recurring	Recurring		Recurring		Guest	14
Nan Martin	Mrs. Louder	Owner of Winfred-Louder	1995–2000	Recurring	Recurring	Recurring	Recurring	Recurring					25
Kelly Perine	Chuck	Security Guard	1995–2000	Recurring	Recurring		Recurring	Recurring					17
Robert Torti	Jay Clemens	Kate' boyfriend/High-School friend	1995–1996, 2000–2001	Recurring	Recurring			Guest	Guest				15
Kevin Pollak	Mr. Bell	Manager of Winfred-Louder	1995–1996	Recurring									9
Kate Walsh	Nicki Fifer	Drew's girlfriend	1997–1999, 2001–2002			Recurring	Recurring			Recurring	Recurring		21
Jenica Bergere	Sharon Bridges	Handywoman/Drew's girlfriend	1997–2000			Recurring	Recurring	Recurring					11
Katy Selverstone	Lisa Robbins	Drew's girlfriend	1995–1997	Recurring	Recurring								16
Bill Cobbs	Tony	Bus driver	2002–2004								Recurring	Recurring	9
Jonathan Mangum	Scott	Drew's boss at Neverendingstore.com	2002–2004								Recurring	Recurring	18
Kyle Howard	Evan	Drew's boss at Neverendingstore.com	2002–2004								Recurring	Guest	14
Kaitlin Olson	Traylor	Works at Neverendingstore.com	2002–2004								Recurring	Recurring	14
Speedy	Speedy The Dog	Drew's dog	1996-2003		Recurring	Recurring	Recurring	Recurring	Recurring	Recurring	Recurring		41
Tim O'Rourke	Tim	Bartender at The Warsaw Tavern	1995–2004	Recurring	Recurring	Recurring	Recurring	Recurring	Recurring	Recurring	Recurring	Recurring	11

=== Regular guest stars ===
- Beulah Carey (Marion Ross) – Drew's mother
- George Carey (Stanley Anderson) – Drew's father
- Kim Harvey (Adrienne Barbeau) – Oswald's mother
- Mother Bobeck (Tammy Faye Bakker) – Mimi's mother
- Gigi Bobeck (Lynn Wanlass) – Mimi's sister
- King Augustus Antonio Carey (Dakota and Ryan Williams, Matthew Josten) – Drew's nephew, Steve and Mimi's son
- Misty Kiniski (June Lockhart) – Lewis's mother

=== Guest stars ===
- Nikki Cox as Drew's cousin Kirsten Carey, who briefly dates Mr. Wick in "Drew's Cousin" (Season 3, Episode 25)
- Shirley Jones as Drew's lady friend Celia (Season 4, 3 Episodes)
- Caroline Rhea as Drew's date Bonnie (Season 2, 2 Episodes)
- Pauley Perrette as Drew's girlfriend Darcy (Season 4, 4 Episodes)
- Dan Castellaneta as Sal, the King of Poland in "Two Drews and the Queen of Poland Walk into A Bar" (all of his scenes were cut from reruns after complaints from the Polish community) (Season 2, Episode 20)
- Hal Linden as Mr. Van Zandt in the episode "Brotherhood of Man" (Season 4, Episode 27)
- Mark Curry as Robert Soulard (Season 5, 6 Episodes)
- John Ratzenberger as himself in Drew Live III
- Eddie Money as himself, the former husband of Mimi Bobeck in "Drew's Stomachache" (Season 5, Episode 10)
- Penn & Teller as Fenn and Geller in "Drew Meets Lawyers" (Season 1, Episode 6) and "See Drew Run" (Season 2, Episode 17)
- David Cross as Earl in "Drew and the Unstable Element" (Season 1, Episode 13) and "Two Drews & the Queen of Poland Walk into a Bar" (Season 2, Episode 20)
- Tim Allen as himself in "The Front" (Season 1, Episode 17)
- Norm MacDonald as Simon Tate in "The Bully You Know" (Season 2, Episode 4)
- Henry Rollins as E-Bay Ass-Kicking Guy and Amy Farrington as Bonnie in "Hickory Dickory... Double Date" (Season 8, Episode 5)
- Richard Chamberlain as Mr. Wick's mother Maggie in "Curse of the Mummy" (Season 7, Episode 14) and "Look Mom, One Hand!" (Season 7, Episode 25)
- Gregory Jbara as Ron in "Drew and the Conspiracy" (Season 4, Episode 1) and "Golden Boy" (Season 4, Episode 3)
- Charles Nelson Reilly as Mr. Hathaway, Lewis's boss, in "The Salon" (Season 3, Episode 16) and "DrugCo" (Season 4, Episode 20)
- Joe Walsh as Ed, a guitarist (7 Episodes)
- French Stewart as Buddy in "Drew's Best Friend" (Season 9, Episode 10)
- Fred Willard as shady con man/travel agent Fred Tuttle (Season 9, Episode 11)
- Colin Mochrie as Eugene in "She's Gotta Have It", "Drew Live", and "Drew Live II"
- Brad Sherwood as Himself/host of "Drew Live" and "Drew Live II"
- Wayne Brady as Himself in "Drew Live", and "Drew Live II"
- Greg Proops, Charles Esten and Kathy Greenwood as themselves in "Drew Live II"
- Chris Palmer, head coach for the Cleveland Browns (Season 5, Episode 2)
- Susan Saint James (Christa Miller's real-life aunt) as Kate's mother Lynn in "Drew and Kate and Kate's Mother" (Season 1, Episode 20)
- Jamie Lee Curtis as Sioux in "Playing a Unified Field" (Season 1, Episode 18)
- Steve Buscemi as Mimi's lawyer in "Mr. Louder's Birthday Party" (Season 3, Episode 15)
- Wanda Sykes as Christine Watson, Drew's girlfriend/boss (Season 7, 3 Episodes)
- Micky Dolenz as Mr. Metcalf in "Drew and the King" (Season 7, Episode 13)
- Tom Poston as Oswald's father (Season 6, Episode 13)
- Beata Pozniak as Raisa (Season 7, Episode 24)
- Julia Duffy as Lindsey Mercer, Lord Mercer's ex-wife who temporarily takes control of Winfred-Louder in "Rich Woman, Poor Man" (Season 7, Episode 23)
- Nicholas Turturro as the New York detective in "New York and Queens" (Season 2, Episode 24)
- Mike McShane as Ray in "Drew's Inheritance" (Season 6, Episode 3)
- Phyllis Diller as Mimi's grandmother (Season 7, Episode 25)
- Megyn Price as waitress at Warsaw Tavern in "Drew and Mr. Bell's Nephew" (Season 1, Episode 14) and "Miss Right" (Season 1, Episode 2)
- Tammy Lauren as Drew's southern belle girlfriend Lily (Season 8, 4 Episodes)
- Dave Winfield as himself in "Science Names Suck" (Season 1, Episode 10)
- Jenny McCarthy as various roles in "Drew Carey's Back-to-School Rock 'n' Roll Comedy Hour" (Season 7, 2 Episodes) and as a Police officer Drew dates in "A Shot in the Dark" (Season 7, Episode 17)
- Amanda Bynes as various roles in "Drew Carey's Back-to-School Rock 'n' Roll Comedy Hour" (Season 7, 2 Episodes)
- Tim Conway as Gus, a senior-home resident who temporarily costs Drew his job (Season 3, Episode 11)
- Brent Hinkley as Frederick (Season 3, Episode 24)
- Bob Costas, Kenny Mayne, and Lynn Swann as themselves in "Tracy Bowl" (Season 4, Episode 19)

=== Special appearances ===
- Little Richard as himself in "Drewstock" (season 2, Episode 14)
- Donald Trump and Carol Channing as themselves in "New York and Queens" (Season 2, Episode 24)
- Rush Limbaugh as himself in "The Salon" (Season 3)
- Dionne Warwick as herself, shopping at Winfred-Louder (Season 3, Episode 9)
- The Reverend Horton Heat as The Underprivileged in "That Thing You Don't" (Season 3, Episode 10)
- "Weird Al" Yankovic as himself in "Drew Between the Rock and a Hard Place" (Season 4)
- Joe Alaskey as Daffy Duck (Applies at Drew's work place for a job in scene before opening title) in "My Best Friend's Wedding"
- Paul "Triple H" Levesque as The Disciplinarian, Pro Wrestler Sponsor for Buzz Beer
- Slash, Rick Nielsen, Dusty Hill, Matthew Sweet, Joey Ramone, Lisa Loeb, Dave Mustaine, Roy Clark, Jonny Lang, and Michael Stanley as themselves and Joe Walsh as Ed in "In Ramada Da Vida" (Season 4, Episode 2)
- Ben Stein as St. Peter
- The James Gang as themselves at the end of Season 4, Episode 4
- Debbie Lee Carrington as Mini Mimi in Season 5, Episode 1
- The Go-Go's as themselves in "The Pregnancy Scare" (season 6, episode 6)
- Lemmy Kilmister and his band Motörhead as themselves in "Drew Gets Out of the Nut House" in Season 7, playing a loud song with altered lyrics from Mimi to apologize for putting Drew in a mental institution
- Kristen Wiig as Sandy, a realtor in "House of the Rising Son-in-Law" (Season 9, Episode 12)

== Episodes ==
Season	Episodes	Originally released		Rank	Avg. rating (Note: In households; seasons 1 and 2)/ Avg. viewers (Note: In millions; seasons 3–9)
Season	Episodes	First released	Last released	Rank	Avg. rating/ Avg. viewers
1	22	September 13, 1995	May 8, 1996	#48	10.1
2	24	September 18, 1996	May 14, 1997	#18	11.5 (Note: Tied with NBC Sunday Night Movie.)
3	28	September 23, 1997	May 20, 1998	#16	16.7
4	27	September 23, 1998	May 26, 1999	#15	14.9
5	26	September 22, 1999	May 17, 2000	#22	14.5
6	27	October 4, 2000	May 23, 2001	#37	12.7
7	27	September 26, 2001	May 22, 2002	#56	9.1
8	26	September 9, 2002	August 27, 2003	#120	5.2
9	26	June 2, 2004	September 8, 2004	#150	3.1

=== Viva Las Vegas ===
The episode "Drew Gets Married" is part of a crossover with Grace Under Fire, Coach and Ellen set in Las Vegas. It features Brett Butler as Grace Kelly, Jerry Van Dyke as Luther Van Dam, Joely Fisher as Paige Clark and Jeremy Piven as Spence Kovak.

== Ratings ==
The show initially finished outside of the Top 30 in the Nielsen ratings, at #48. In the second season, ratings improved, and the series jumped into the Top 25, remaining there for the next three seasons as well. The sixth season finished just outside of the Top 30, at #37. This is attributable to the erosion of network audiences that began in the late 1990s.

After its sixth season, ABC and Warner Bros. Television negotiated to keep the series on through the 2003-04 television season, which would place it in its ninth season. However, in its seventh season, The Drew Carey Show experienced a dramatic ratings drop, as did several other ABC series. A schedule move by ABC for the eighth season resulted in even worse ratings, falling out of the Top 100. At midseason, ABC placed the series on hiatus, and attempted to get out of the contract with Warner Bros. Television. When they were unable to, ABC finished the eighth season in the summer, and decided to burn off the ninth and final season during the summer of 2004. The series finale was viewed by a little over 5 million viewers.

=== Average seasonal ratings ===
Season	Episodes	Timeslot (EDT)	Season premiere	Season finale	TV season	Rank	Nielsen rating (Households, seasons 1 and 2; Viewers (in millions), seasons 3–9)
1	22	Wednesday 8:30 pm	September 13, 1995	May 8, 1996	1995–96	#48	10.1
2	24	Wednesday 9:30 pm (1–10); Wednesday 9:00 pm (11–24)	September 18, 1996	May 14, 1997	1996–97	#18	11.5
3	28	Wednesday 9:00 pm	September 23, 1997	May 20, 1998	1997–98	#16	16.7
4	27	Wednesday 9:00 pm	September 23, 1998	May 26, 1999	1998–99	#15	14.9
5	26	Wednesday 9:00 pm	September 22, 1999	May 17, 2000	1999–2000	#22	14.5
6	27	Wednesday 9:00 pm	October 4, 2000	May 23, 2001	2000–01	#37	12.7
7	27	Wednesday 9:00 pm	September 26, 2001	May 22, 2002	2001–02	#56	9.1
8	26	Monday 8:00 pm (1–6); Friday 9:30 pm (7–14); Wednesday 9:00 pm/9:30 pm (15–24); Wednesday 9:30 pm (25–26)	September 9, 2002	August 27, 2003	2002–03	#120	5.2
9	26	Wednesday 9:00 pm/9:30 pm	June 2, 2004	September 8, 2004	2003–04	#150	3.1

== Syndication ==
The Drew Carey Show entered off-network syndication in September 1999 and continued until September 2008 airing on independent stations and the affiliates of Fox, UPN, and The WB.

The series began airing on TBS in October 2002, with reruns airing on the network until late 2007. ION aired reruns of the show from 2007 to 2009, premiering on December 31, 2007 (New Year's Eve), with the station promoting it as "The Drew Year." ION Television did not air all of the episodes as it only aired the episodes that aired from seasons 1–5; the channel also removed extremely sexual references from certain episodes, the season 5 episode "Do Drew and Kate Have Sex?" being one in particular.

The CW also aired episodes during the 2008–09 television season. Two back-to-back episodes were aired on Sundays at 6:00pm to replace the cancelled Sunday Night Block by Media Rights Capital.

In Canada, the show ran in syndication on TVtropolis until June 2013, when the channel was rebranded as DTour. The series returned to DTour in April 2025. The series also aired on DejaView.

Laff began carrying the show as part of its inaugural lineup when it launched in April 2015. The series was dropped from Laff's lineup in the fall of 2019.

Rewind TV began airing The Drew Carey Show reruns from December 2021 to January 1, 2024. It would later move to sister station Antenna TV, premiering on that same date. It has since moved back to Rewind TV on January 1, 2026, with Antenna TV continuing to air it, but just on Sundays.

=== Streaming ===
On August 10, 2024, all 9 seasons of the show were made available to stream for free through Plex, although music has been replaced or removed in several episodes and 5 episodes are missing altogether due to music licensing issues.

In December 2024, the series was released on Pluto TV. In November 2025, all seasons of the series were released on Tubi.

== Merchandise ==
During the height of the show's popularity, Creation Entertainment manufactured Barbie-esque dolls of Drew and Mimi, which came with accessories. Kinney helped to choose the clothing and make-up for the Mimi doll. Matchbox also released Drew's car, a Volkswagen Beetle with flames on the sides which Drew owned from the third season until the eighth. The soundtrack album Cleveland Rocks! Music from The Drew Carey Show was released in May 1998.

== Home media ==
The Drew Carey Show: TV Favorites DVD cover

On February 28, 2006, a six-episode release of the sitcom was released on DVD titled The Drew Carey Show: TV Favorites. Initially, the DVD was exclusively sold at Best Buy, but later sold at other national retailers as well. The DVD features the episodes "Pilot," "Playing the Unified Field," "We'll Remember Always, Evaluation Day," "Drew Blows His Promotion," "My Best Friend's Wedding," and "DrugCo." However, this DVD has since gone out of print.

On April 24, 2007, Warner Home Video released the complete first season of The Drew Carey Show on DVD in Region 1. The first season was also released in Australia (Region 4) on September 10, 2008.

In 2014, Carey released a statement where he said that the reason as to why the second season, and any of the later seasons have yet to be released to this day is because of copyright issues regarding music used on the show. In March 2025, it was announced that the complete series would be released on DVD on May 13, 2025. However, four episodes are not included due to music copyright issues: "Drew's Dance Party" (season 4, episode 10), "Drew Carey's Back-to-School Rock 'n' Roll Comedy Hour: Parts 1 & 2" (season 7, episodes 1 & 2) and "What's Love Got to Do With It?" (season 8, episode 17).

DVD name	Ep#	Region 1	Region 2	Region 4	Special features
The Drew Carey Show: TV Favorites	6	February 28, 2006	N/A	N/A	"Pilot" (season 1, episode 1); "Playing the Unified Field" (season 1, episode 18); "We'll Remember Always, Evaluation Day" (season 2, episode 1); "Drew Blows His Promotion" (season 2, episode 15); "My Best Friend's Wedding" (season 3, episode 28); "DrugCo" (season 4, episode 20)
The Complete First Season	22	April 24, 2007	N/A	September 10, 2008	1-900-MIMI (a phone sex spoof featuring Mimi); Life Inside a Cubicle Featurette
The Complete Series	229	May 13, 2025	N/A	N/A	Life Inside a Cubicle Featurette
