= List of The Drew Carey Show characters =

This is a list of characters who have appeared on The Drew Carey Show.

== Main characters ==
Actor	Character	Role	Years	Seasons									Episodes
Actor	Character	Role	Years	1	2	3	4	5	6	7	8	9	Episodes
Drew Carey	Drew Allison Carey	Assistant Director of Personnel	1995–2004	Main	Main	Main	Main	Main	Main	Main	Main	Main	233
Diedrich Bader	Oswald Lee Harvey	Delivery Man/Trainee Nurse	1995–2004	Main	Main	Main	Main	Main	Main	Main	Main	Main	233
Christa Miller	Kate O'Brien	Cosmetic Saleswoman/Rock and Roll Hall of Fame	1995–2002	Main	Main	Main	Main	Main	Main	Main	Main ^{1}		184
Ryan Stiles	Lewis Kiniski	Janitor at DrugCo.	1995–2004	Main	Main	Main	Main	Main	Main	Main	Main	Main	224
Kathy Kinney	Mimi Bobeck	P.A./Floor Manager	1995–2004	Main^{2}									232
Craig Ferguson	Nigel Algernon Wick	Drew's boss	1996–2004		Main	Main	Main	Main	Main	Main	Main ^{3}	Guest	170
John Carroll Lynch	Steve Carey	Cosmetics Salesman/Stay-At-Home Husband	1998–2004			Recurring	Recurring	Recurring	Main	Main	Main ^{4}	Guest	73
Cynthia Watros	Kellie Newmark	Waitress	2002–2004								Main	Main	52

=== Notes ===
1. Christa Miller only appeared in the first and second episodes in Season 8.
2. Kathy Kinney is credited as a guest star in the pilot episode, but she is credited as Starring from the second episode on.
3. Craig Ferguson was credited as Starring in all episodes of Season 8, but only appeared in 4 episodes.
4. John Carroll Lynch appeared in 8 episodes in Season 8, and was only credited as Starring for the episodes he appeared in.
- Drew Carey (Drew Carey) – Drew Carey is the main protagonist of the series. A perpetual "nice guy", for most of the series, he works in the human resources department of Winfred-Louder, a multinational department store chain. Drew is the founder and co-owner of Buzz Beer, a coffee-flavored caffeinated beer (at the time, such drinks were legal but uncommon in the United States). He has a long-standing feud with co-worker Mimi Bobeck; both play endless, occasionally complicated, seriously mean-spirited pranks on each other until she becomes his sister-in-law, after which they still dislike each other.
- Mimi Bobeck (Kathy Kinney) – Mimi Bobeck is Mr. Wick's assistant/secretary and the main antagonist of the series. Much like Fonzie from Happy Days and Steve Urkel from Family Matters, the Mimi character was originally a one-time character, only appearing in the pilot episode. She is an overweight woman who wears a lot of makeup, yet has a very high but unstable self-esteem. (As an in-joke, Mimi's mother was played by known makeup addict Tammy Faye Bakker.) Mimi is Drew's nemesis; she vowed to make Drew's life a living hell after Drew denied her a job based on her makeup. Mimi's pranks included gluing Drew's hand to a pornographic magazine, covering Drew's desk with garbage, and eventually sending Drew to China while he is unconscious. She is also known for calling him "Pig" and "Doughboy." Mimi's past has a lot of connections to the world of music; she often talks about being a roadie for Foghat and was married to Eddie Money for two weeks after appearing at his first concert. Additionally, she claims to have slept with both Joe Walsh and Peter Frampton. Later on, Mimi becomes more of a friend to Drew (they agree to put their feud on hold while Mimi dates and later marries his brother, Steve) and a loving, if unconventional, mother to Gus. Early in the series, it was revealed that Mimi was Catholic and of Polish ancestry, and inherited the title of Duchess of Kraków after her aunt died. (Starting in 2009, Mimi/Kinney resurfaced as a guest on The Price Is Right, hosted by Drew Carey since October 15, 2007, during the show's April Fool's episode, first in 2009 as a model and then ransacking Mike Richards' position as executive producer on the show, in 2010. Carey usually promotes Kinney's next project during the closing of that episode.)
- Lewis Kiniski (Ryan Stiles) – Forming a double-act with Oswald, Lewis is tall, gangly, and perpetually bemused. Ryan Stiles once described Lewis as "Not even a character at first, just a creep really." He possesses an IQ of 162, but works as a janitor for a company called DrugCo, which conducts bizarre experiments. Due to accidentally releasing a strain of bacteria into the population, he was busted down to janitor from a position that required him to wear a lab coat. At one point, he posed as Drew to take his physical exam for him, unexpectedly taking a psychiatric exam as well. He tried to give answers which he thought suited Drew's life and situation, and the results showed him to be mentally unstable and possibly criminally insane. He mentioned in one episode he was adopted.
- Oswald Lee Harvey (Diedrich Bader) – Lewis's slightly shorter, dark-haired friend is the dumb one of the double-act, which tends to be his most distinguishing characteristic. Lewis described him once as a "man-child stuck in a sort of prolonged adolescence." Oswald was a deejay at the beginning of the first season but later on became a delivery driver for Global Parcel (a fictional package-delivery service whose uniforms are modeled after those of UPS). He later attempted to become a nurse, but he failed the required tests. Drew later got him a job as a delivery man for Never Ending Store, but Oswald was injured on store property. After receiving damages, he bought the Warsaw. In the episode Bus-ted, it is revealed that Oswald joined the group of friends to replace Adam, a childhood friend who fell through the ice on a lake. Aside from Carey, Bader is the only cast member to appear in every episode of the series. The name of Bader's character is a reference to Lee Harvey Oswald, the gunman who assassinated President John F. Kennedy.
- Kate O'Brien (Christa Miller) – Friends with Drew, Lewis, and Oswald since they were kids. Kate is a bit of a tomboy and a hothead and good with her fists. She and Oswald almost got married at one point, but she called it off just after Oswald threw her a surprise wedding (essentially leaving Oswald at the altar). She later found out about Drew's long-standing crush on her at their high school reunion, and she realized that she had feelings for him too. They dated for a season (even becoming engaged) but broke up when they disagreed about having kids. Drew and Kate were married for a short time in a later season, although this was illegal, as Drew had just become married to his old girlfriend, Nicki. Eventually, Drew's sham was discovered and Kate felt betrayed. Drew eventually regained Kate's trust and they became friends again. Kate left at the beginning of the eighth season, marrying a Naval aviator and moving from Cleveland to Guam.
- Nigel Algernon Wick (Craig Ferguson) – Drew's boss after the first season, replacing Mr. Bell (Kevin Pollak). English, crude, boisterous and offensive, he was also a cocaine addict before he was forced to go into rehab. For some time, he and Drew were in a same-sex marriage (technically a civil union) in order for Mr. Wick to get his green card and Drew to get his job back. When he first appeared on stage in guest episodes in the last two seasons he was greeted with thunderous applause. Wick always had unusual methods of firing employees (usually men surnamed Johnson), which he does in most episodes. He is almost always referred to as "Mr. Wick", and his first name, Nigel, is rarely used. In the show's first April Fool's Day episode, Wick was shot in the crotch with a crossbow by an employee (named Johnson) whom he had just fired. Wick had to have one of his testicles removed. Wick also lost a toe and a nipple in a fox hunt that went terribly wrong. Craig Ferguson initially auditioned at Warner Bros. for a role as a Hispanic photographer on Suddenly Susan, and after he failed his audition (with the role instead going to Cuban-American actor Nestor Carbonell), the casting director referred him to The Drew Carey Show which was auditioning across the studio. Ferguson, who is Scottish, played the role with an over-the-top posh English accent "to make up for generations of English actors doing crap Scottish accents." At the end of one episode, Ferguson broke the fourth wall and began talking to the audience at home in his regular Scottish accent.
- Steve Carey (John Carroll Lynch) – Drew's straight but cross-dressing older brother (in reality John Carroll Lynch is 5 years younger than Drew Carey). He came to Cleveland and got a job in the cosmetics department at Winfred-Louder. He fell in love with Mimi and after one season of dating they married in a ceremony in Drew's backyard, with Drew officiating along with an online minister from an Internet website. In later seasons the concept of Steve being a cross-dresser is abandoned entirely with little explanation (though it is hinted that he gave it up to make Mimi happy). He left, along with Kate and Wick, early in the eighth season.
- Kellie Newmark (Cynthia Watros) – Drew's childhood friend. She has had a crush on Drew since high school but never told him. She was married but her husband cheated on her with her sister. Her mother is an alcoholic and leaves her father, eventually hooking up with Lewis. After Kate leaves, Drew realizes that he loves Kellie. Drew is afraid to tell Kellie because it may ruin their friendship like it did with Kate. After Lily leaves Drew, they confess their feelings for each other. When Kellie comes out while Drew is talking to his dad and asks Drew what they are going to do about their feelings for each other, Drew's dad falls off the roof and dies. Eventually during the beginning stage of their relationship Kellie finds out she is pregnant with Drew Jr. but won't marry Drew because she doesn't think he is ready for marriage. During the finale she decides Drew is ready. But her water breaks and she and Drew get married right when the baby is born.

== Drew's marriages ==
Much of the show's humor revolved around Drew's single life. However, Drew was married a number of times during the show's run. His spouses during the series were:

- Diane (Nicole Sullivan) – A cocktail waitress Drew met on a business trip to Las Vegas. She tricked Drew into marrying her because she believed having a husband would give her an edge in winning custody of her children. Drew agreed to help her with the social workers, and they divorced a week later.
- Mr. Wick (Craig Ferguson) - Drew's boss for the majority of the series, desperately wanted a spouse when his visa expired and he was threatened with deportation. He bribed Drew with a promotion and several benefits to get Drew to marry him in Vermont. They stayed married for just over a year to throw off any suspicion from the INS. Drew kicked Mr. Wick out of his house once Wick became too "clingy" with Drew's friends and life.
- Nicki Fifer (Kate Walsh) - A real estate agent whom Drew dated and became engaged to; she dumped him after gaining a large amount of weight while they were dating (and, in her own words, "couldn't be with a man who loved to eat"). She lost the weight, got married and came back to Drew after her divorce (when Drew had just left a mental institution). Drew asked her to marry him on an impulse, and she agreed. Unfortunately, Drew married Kate soon after (thus becoming a bigamist) and she left him. Nicki returned later, having regained all her previous weight, and attempted to kill Drew because she blamed him for all the recent problems in her life. Drew let Nicki stay at his house until she could get back on her feet, after which she was rarely seen again. Lewis helped her through something. He tried to have a relationship with her, but she refused.
- Kate O'Brien (Christa Miller) – The love of Drew's life and his best friend since childhood, Drew and Kate first broke off their engagement after a disagreement about having kids. After Drew's stint in the mental hospital, Kate realized that she still loved Drew and asked him to marry her. Drew agreed (despite having recently married Nicki and still being married to Mr. Wick) and kept both his marriages a secret for a time. Both wives discovered the situation, and Kate, furious, dumped Drew and told the newspapers about the situation; Drew became known as "The Impotent Bisexual Bigamist."
- Lily (Tammy Lauren) – A Southern belle who met Drew after Oswald and Lewis started a campaign to find him a wife. Drew brought Lily to Cleveland and attempted to establish a relationship with her, but found it difficult to deal with Lily's night terrors. Drew ended up proposing to Lily on three different occasions: once in his house, another in a movie theater, and finally, back at his home again. After Drew tore up all of his pre-determined wedding plan receipts, Lily agreed to marry him. Lily left Drew after the wedding, driving off without him after giving Drew his ring back. At the reception, Drew and Kellie expressed their hidden love for each other and began their relationship, which would also lead to Drew's final marriage.
- Kellie Newmark (Cynthia Watros) – Drew's childhood friend who was introduced in the eighth season. Drew went to a strip club and discovered that Kellie was working as a stripper to support herself after her divorce from her husband. Drew takes her into his home and their friendship blossoms. They were both reluctant to confess their feelings for each other, but they became a couple after Drew and Lily's wedding. Kellie soon becomes pregnant, but refuses to marry Drew for another eight months. On their wedding day and the series finale, Kellie gave birth to Drew Jr.

== Recurring characters ==
Actor	Character	Role	Years	Seasons									Episodes
Actor	Character	Role	Years	1	2	3	4	5	6	7	8	9	Episodes
Ian Gomez	Larry Almada	Worked at Winfred-Louder/Matchmaker	1995–1999, 2002–2004	Recurring	Recurring	Recurring	Recurring				Recurring	Recurring	38
Jane Morris	Nora	Co-worker at Winfred-Louder	1995–2002, 2004	Recurring	Recurring		Recurring	Recurring		Recurring		Guest	14
Nan Martin	Mrs. Louder	Owner of Winfred-Louder	1995–2000	Recurring	Recurring	Recurring	Recurring	Recurring					25
Kelly Perine	Chuck	Security Guard	1995–2000	Recurring	Recurring		Recurring	Recurring					17
Robert Torti	Jay Clemens	Kate' boyfriend/High-School friend	1995–1996, 2000–2001	Recurring	Recurring			Guest	Guest				15
Kevin Pollak	Mr. Bell	Manager of Winfred-Louder	1995–1996	Recurring									9
Kate Walsh	Nicki Fifer	Drew's girlfriend	1997–1999, 2001–2002			Recurring	Recurring			Recurring	Recurring		21
Jenica Bergere	Sharon Bridges	Handywoman/Drew's girlfriend	1997–2000			Recurring	Recurring	Recurring					11
Katy Selverstone	Lisa Robbins	Drew's girlfriend	1995–1997	Recurring	Recurring								16
Bill Cobbs	Tony	Bus driver	2002–2004								Recurring	Recurring	9
Jonathan Mangum	Scott	Drew's boss at Neverendingstore.com	2002–2004								Recurring	Recurring	18
Kyle Howard	Evan	Drew's boss at Neverendingstore.com	2002–2004								Recurring	Guest	14
Kaitlin Olson	Traylor	Works at Neverendingstore.com	2002–2004								Recurring	Recurring	14
Speedy	Speedy The Dog	Drew's dog	1996–2003		Recurring	Recurring	Recurring	Recurring	Recurring	Recurring	Recurring		41
Tim O'Rourke	Tim	Bartender at The Warsaw Tavern	1995–2004	Recurring	Recurring	Recurring	Recurring	Recurring	Recurring	Recurring	Recurring	Recurring	11

- Larry Almada (Ian Gomez) – One of Drew's co-workers, Larry is a bumbling and somewhat unprofessional employee who is often willing to resort to less than savory methods to gain the upper hand. During a competition to determine the new employee representative on the Winfred-Louder board of directors, he managed to obtain the position by having sex with Mrs. Louder, a practice he repeats several times after being dumped by his wife. He loses his job on the board shortly after receiving the promotion, but continues his secret relationship with Mrs. Louder. He also ends up in jail for selling drugs, but is released and continues his job at the department store. After leaving Winfred-Louder, he set up a reasonably successful dating service which later expanded into a television chat show.
- Gerald Hawthorne Bell (Kevin Pollak) – Drew's boss for the show's first season. Mr. Bell only appeared in person for his last appearance. He gets caught having relations with a woman in his office, and he and Mrs. Louder have to talk it out. When he appears, he is wearing a Santa costume. We only heard his voice on Drew's speakerphone, despite the fact that Drew had his desk very close to Bell's office. Little was known about him, but he behaved in a sexist and unprofessional manner, including liaisons with at least one female staffer. In the last episode of the first season, Mr. Bell finally appeared on camera as he was seen leaving his office after getting fired from the store. The running joke of his never being officially seen until this moment is referenced in dialogue when he says; "What's the matter, Carey? You act like you've never seen me before!"
- Fran Louder (Nan Martin) – Mrs. Louder is one of the executives' "cougars" and partial namesake of the Winfred-Louder corporation who originally inherited the store from her dead husband. She is the CEO of the company that owns the department store, and retains her position even after the corporation is bought out by a larger company located in Amsterdam. As the head of the store, she thinks very little of Drew, and openly expresses surprise at the assertion that he still has dreams of becoming more successful, Mrs. Louder occasionally gives him minor promotions throughout the series, but his personality clashes with her ruthless and businesslike nature. She is somewhat sex-obsessed and conducts a long affair with the boorish, lazy, and obnoxious Larry Almada, played by Ian Gomez. (In another episode we learn Almada is superendowed sexually.) Mrs. Louder is last seen accompanying Mimi and Steve on their honeymoon (she advises them that she is a voyeur but they are forced to take her with them, anyway). She is removed from power shortly after when a member of the board improvises a speech slurring ethnic groups and gays. The insulted employees begin to riot, gaining the attention of the bosses in Amsterdam, who replace the entire board of directors except, for some reason, Mr. Wick.
- Robert Soulard (Mark Curry) – One of Drew's bosses at Winfred-Louder, Mr. Soulard was appointed by the Dutch as Mrs. Louder's replacement after the latter was fired along with the original board of directors. Slightly more open-minded than his predecessor, Mr. Soulard agrees to listen to the employees after he is made the new boss, and quickly appoints Drew to be the new Store Manager when Mr. Wick's incompetence gets him sent to Toledo for retraining.
- Beulah Carey (Marion Ross) – Drew's and Steve's mother, married to George Carey (Stanley Anderson). George Carey dies towards the end of the series' run, although not due to the death of the actor.
- Kim Harvey (Adrienne Barbeau) – Oswald's mother, who wears tight clothes and sweaters with plunging necklines. Her sexiness caused the young Drew in his childhood to commit some embarrassing faux pas.
- King Augustus Antonio Carey (Dakota and Ryan Williams (seasons 6–8) and Matthew Josten (season 9)) – Gus is Steve and Mimi's son as well as Drew's nephew, who saved Mimi from being fired by Drew in the episode "Drew Pops Something On Kate". Just as Drew is about to fire Mimi, he kicks while in the womb for the first time, causing him to feel compassion for Mimi and preventing him from firing her. Gus was born while Drew was in a coma, and his spirit (voiced by Jon Polito) met Drew up in Heaven before being born. After hearing Drew make jokes about how horrible Mimi was, Gus was afraid to be born. Drew convinced him that Mimi would be a good mother by going back down to Earth and spending time in the baby's body. Drew told this story to the others after coming out of his coma, but nobody believed him. Gus was an infant for most of his time on the show, but received an age boost (putting him somewhere between 5 and 6 years old) for the final season (played by Matthew Josten). He burns down his house, initially thought to be with a wood-burning kit that Drew gives him as a gift. Since Mimi and Gus had nowhere to live, Drew offers his home to them, and they stay there almost until the end of the show. It was later discovered that Gus was a pyromaniac and intentionally started a fire in the house.
- Lisa Robbins (Katy Selverstone) – Drew's girlfriend from season one, she is prevented from dating him as the rules at Winfred-Louder do not allow management to participate in romantic relationships with their employees. Although this initially forces them to hide their relationship in public, they eventually find a way to overcome this obstacle. She vies for a job as the head of the personal shopper department to become a member of the store's management, prompting a competition with fellow applicants Kate and Mimi. Lisa begins dating Drew after she gets the job, but after a failed attempt to live together they agree to break up. She leaves her dog, Speedy, behind to stay with him and departs for good after her marriage in the second season.
- Lord Mercer (Jim Piddock) – An extremely wealthy Englishman, who bought Winfred-Louder and became the new owner after the Dutch divested themselves of the company/store(s). He also brings back Mr. Wick, saying only Englishmen know how to run a business: despite this, he once put his teenybopper daughter Milan (Jessica Cauffiel) in charge of Winfred-Lauder.
- Christine Watson (Wanda Sykes) – Hired to replace Nigel Wick as manager in season 7, falls in love with Drew.
- Jay Clemens (Robert Torti) – Kate's handsome boyfriend from season one.
- Evan (Kyle Howard) – Co-owner of Never Ending Store with his brother, Scott (of the two bosses, he is regarded as the 'nice' one). He is a Zen-seeking Buddhist who promotes peace and support, although he himself has a life coach, sees a family therapist with his brother, and takes anti-anxiety pills. He has a tenuous relationship with Scott because they spend so much time together.
- Scott (Jonathan Mangum) – Co-owner of Never Ending Store with his brother, Evan. He is more business-minded than Evan, and can get very irritated by Evan's peace-seeking way of life. He teaches computer classes during the summer.
- Traylor (Kaitlin Olson) – An employee at Never Ending Store who quickly forms an adversarial relationship with Mimi. She is also vain and behaves condescendingly at times.
- Mrs. Wick (Richard Chamberlain) – Nigel Wick's "Mum" Maggie, played by Chamberlain in drag. The character is clearly promiscuous, young Nigel having grown up with a series of "uncles" in and out of his life.
- Chuck (Kelly Perine) – Security Guard/Head of Security at Winfred-Louder. Chuck is a fellow employee at Winfred-Louder who seems to have a friendly relationship with Drew, as he, in his first appearance in the episode "No Two Things Are Exactly Alike" in Season 1, he tips Drew to the person who complained about a fellow employee who became offended at a sexually offensive cartoon which he put on a memo in the hopes of boosting company morale. In Chuck's final appearance in the Season 5 episode "Drew and the Racial Tension Play", Chuck is among the many minority employees who become offended at the socially insensitive comments of senior company board member Arthur Crawford (Hansford Rowe) who try to solicit Drew to get Crawford to apologize for his comments or resign.

== Notable guest stars/actor cameos ==
- Tim Allen – Himself
- David Lander – Himself
- Jamie Lee Curtis – Sioux
- David Cross – Earl
- Tom Bosley – Mimi's Father
- Tammy Faye – Mimi's Mother
- Brian Haley – Drew Look-Alike
- Martin Mull – Himself
- Michael R. White – Himself
- Dan Castellaneta – Stan
- Rachel Hunter – Herself
- Donald Trump – Himself
- Carol Channing – Herself
- Rush Limbaugh – Himself
- Eugene Levy – Dr. Rider
- Joe Alaskey – Daffy Duck
- Dick Clark – Himself
- Paul "Triple H" Levesque – The Disciplinarian
- Bo Derek – Herself
- Wayne Brady – Himself
- Greg Proops – Himself
- Brad Sherwood – Himself
- Laura Hall – Herself
- Arturo Brachetti – Himself
- J.P. Manoux – Malcolm
- Cameron Mathison – Kirk
- Norm Macdonald – Simon Tate
- Heather Locklear – Herself
- Dave Mustaine – Himself
- Charles Esten – Himself
- Kathy Greenwood – Herself
- Carmen Electra – Lewis's Boss
- Jay Leno – Lewis's Boss
- Charles Nelson Reilly – Lewis's Boss
- Ben Stein – Heavenly Guide
- Gary Coleman – Drew's African-American Double
- Jimmie Walker – Lewis's African-American Double
- Meshach Taylor – Oswald's African-American Double
- Kim Fields – Kate's African-American Double
- Thea Vidale – Mimi's African-American Double
- Jenny McCarthy – Sketch Player/Marlo Kelly
- Amanda Bynes – Sketch Player
- Henry Winkler – Mr. Newsome
- John Ratzenberger – Himself
- Leslie Sykes – Herself
- Lacey Chabert – Grace
- Roselyn Sanchez – Maria
- Kathryn Joosten – Natalie
- French Stewart – Buddy
- Lorenzo Music – Store Announcer
- Jeff Davis – Himself/D'Artagnan
- Jessica Cauffiel – Milan
- Purva Bedi - Padma
- Illeana Douglas – Rachel Murray
- Tom Poston – Oswald's conniving former jailbird father
- Colin Mochrie – Eugene Anderson
- Wayne Knight – Insurance examiner
- Kathy Griffin - Kathy
- Joe Walsh - Ed
- Paul Benedict - Jeremy

== See also ==
- The Drew Carey Show
- List of The Drew Carey Show episodes
