= Kathy Kinney =

American actress

- Born: Stevens Point, Wisconsin, US
- Occupations: Actress; comedian
- Years active: 1986–present

Kathy Kinney is an American actress and comedian. After appearing as Prudence Godard on the CBS sitcom Newhart (1989–1990), she achieved fame with her portrayal of Mimi Bobeck on ABC's The Drew Carey Show (1995–2004). Her film credits include Parting Glances (1987), Scrooged (1988), Three Fugitives (1989), Stanley & Iris, Arachnophobia (both 1990), This Boy's Life (1993) and Picking Up the Pieces (2000).

== Early life, family and education ==
Kinney was born in Stevens Point, Wisconsin. Her father died when she was 15 years old.

After high school, Kinney worked for the California Conservation Corps between 1972 and 1974. After completing a six-month Back Country season in Kings Canyon National Park, she left the program with thousands of dollars in scholarships. She attended the University of Wisconsin–Stevens Point in the 1970s but received her degree in 2016. In 1976, she moved to New York City, where she found work as a secretary at WCBS-TV.

== Career ==
Armed with the success of Parting Glances, Kinney visited friends in Los Angeles, and decided to permanently move there to pursue a career in acting. In LA, Kinney worked regularly as a character actress, landing small roles in various TV series such as Seinfeld (Season 4, Episode 22, "The Handicap Spot"), Grace Under Fire, Full House, Boy Meets World, The Larry Sanders Show and My Name Is Earl. Her first memorable television role is generally considered her regular stint on Newhart as Miss Goddard, the town librarian (1989–1990). Her performances in feature films include Arachnophobia, Stanley & Iris, Scrooged, Three Fugitives, Lenny the Wonder Dog, and This Boy's Life.

The Drew Carey Show aired on ABC from 1995 to 2004. Her character Mimi Bobeck was originally intended for a one-time appearance in the pilot, when she interviewed for a cosmetics job at Winfred-Louder. When she was turned down due to her garish makeup, Mimi raised a fuss and threatened to sue. Positive public reaction prompted the Mimi storyline to continue (the store hired her as a secretary to prevent her from suing).

Kinney and Carey have performed many times since working together on his sitcom. Kinney appeared in the American version of Whose Line Is It Anyway?, hosted by Carey and also on ABC. They appeared in Lois & Clark: The New Adventures of Superman (another series on ABC), contemporaneous with The Drew Carey Show's second season). In 2006, she visited Iraq with Carey and his Improv All-Star Team, a series of USO performances for American troops; as a result, she appears in the documentary film Patriot Act: A Jeffrey Ross Home Movie. On March 24, 2009, Kinney appeared in character as Mimi in the beginning of The Late Late Show with Craig Ferguson. (Ferguson was a co-star on The Drew Carey Show, playing Mimi and Carey's boss, Mr. Wick.) A week later, on April Fools' Day, Kinney reprised her role as Mimi during that day's The Price Is Right, hosted by Carey, appearing as a guest model. She repeated the role on April Fool's Day in 2010, this time usurping the post of executive producer. She replaced the show's announcer with a man in a monkey suit along with using four male models. Beginning in March 2011, Kinney appeared in Drew Carey's Improv-A-Ganza TV gameshow. In September 2019, Kinney appeared in the episode "Bigger Kids, Bigger Problems" of the TV series American Housewife. She played the lunch lady and reunited with former co-stars Carey, Ryan Stiles and Diedrich Bader as part of ABC's Cast from the Past Week.

In 2008, Kinney became the co-creator, co-president and star of MrsP.com, an entertainment website for children. Kinney portrays Mrs. P, an eccentric redhead who loves books and reads classic children's stories from her magical library. After nearly two years in development, the site launched in beta on November 10, 2008.

She guest starred on the animated TV series The Penguins of Madagascar as Rhonda the walrus, Marlene's disgusting roommate, in the 2009 episode "Roomies". Rhonda made a second appearance in the episode "The Hoboken Surprise" in 2011. She also guest-starred on The Secret Life of the American Teenager.

In March 2010, Kinney co-authored the book Queen of Your Own Life: The Grown-up Woman's Guide to Claiming Happiness and Getting the Life You Deserve with Cindy Ratzlaff, published by Harlequin.

== Filmography ==
=== Film ===
Film
Year	Title	Role	Notes
1986	Parting Glances	Joan	
1988	Scrooged	IBC Nurse	
1989	Three Fugitives	Receptionist	
1990	Stanley & Iris	Bernice	
1990	Arachnophobia	Blaire Kendall	
1991	The Linguini Incident	Denise	
1993	This Boy's Life	Marian	
1993	Mr. Jones	Homeless Lady	
2000	Business of Acting	Herself	Documentary
2000	Picking Up the Pieces	Mrs. Tatler	
2000	Lost in the Pershing Point Hotel	Red Neck Nurse	
2000	Behind the Seams	Freddie	
2003	Bitter Jester	Herself	Documentary
2004	Al Roach: Private Insectigator	Betty Earwiggins	Short film
2005	Lenny the Wonder Dog	Lisa Lathers	
2010	Starter Home	Sandi	Short film

=== Television ===
Television
Year	Title	Role	Notes
1988	Inherit the Wind	Woman at Depot	TV movie
1988	Promised a Miracle	Cindy Wilson	TV movie
1989–1990	Newhart	Prudence Godard	9 episodes
1990	Grand	Marge	Season 2 episode 8: "Lady Luck"
1991	Tagteam	Instructor	TV movie
1991	Dream On	Nora	Season 2 episode 9: "Play Melville for Me"
1992	Cruel Doubt	Skeptical Neighbor	Mini-series
1992	The Larry Sanders Show	Dog Trainer	Season 1 episode 1: "What Have You Done for Me Lately?"
1992	Step by Step	The Proctor	Season 2 episode 1: "S.A.T. Blues"
1993	Seinfeld	Bystander	Season 4 episode 22: "The Handicap Spot"
1993	Fallen Angels	Mrs. Sullivan	Season 1 episode 3: "The Quiet Room"
1994	Bakersfield P.D.	Mrs. Blaisher	Episode 17: "Last One Into the Water"
1995	Full House	Mrs. Bedrosian	Season 8 episode 14: "Super Bowl Fun Day"
1995	Boy Meets World	Rifkin	Season 2 episode 16: "Danger Boy"
1995	Grace Under Fire	Nurse	Season 2 episode 18: "Emmet Bypass"
1995	Runway One	Proprietor of Motel	TV movie
1995–2004	The Drew Carey Show	Mimi Bobeck / Mimi Bobeck Carey	Main role - 233 episodes
1996	Lois & Clark: The New Adventures of Superman	Katie Banks	Season 4 episode 9: "Ghosts"
1997	Coach	Mimi Bobeck	Season 9 episode 15: "Viva Las Ratings"
1998	General Hospital	Waitress	Episode: April 2, 1998
1998	The Brian Benben Show	The Facilitator	Episode 3: "Brian's Got Back, Part 1"
1998	Whose Line Is It Anyway?	Herself	Season 1 episode 6: September 9, 1998
1998	Two Guys, a Girl and a Pizza Place	Mimi Bobeck	Season 2 episode 6: "Two Guys, a Girl and a Psycho Halloween"
1998	ABC TGIF	Mimi Bobeck	2 episodes - Previews of upcoming episodes of The Drew Carey Show
1999	Chicken Soup for the Soul		Episode: "The Seed Jar"
1999	The Hughleys	Mimi Bobeck Carey	Season 2 episode 1: "Young Guns"
1999–2000	The Norm Show	Mimi Bobeck Carey / Betty	Also known as Norm Show; 2 episodes
1999–2001	Big Guy and Rusty the Boy Robot	Jenny the Monkey	Also known as The Big Guy and Rusty; Credited as Kathryn Kinney; Voice; 26 episodes
1999–2003	Hollywood Squares	Herself / Mimi - Panelist	25 episodes
2001	Pepper Ann	Mama Destructo (voice)	2 episodes
2001	Drew Carey's Improv All-Stars	Herself	
2001	Nikki	Vegas Woman	Season 1 episode 12: "Let It Ride"
2001	Rock & Roll Back to School Special	Mimi Bobeck (Money) Carey	TV special
2002	Pyramid	Herself / Celebrity Contestant	1 episode
2002	3-South		Voice; Episode 2: "Stomach Pump"
2002	What's New, Scooby-Doo?	Sheriff Ellen Perkins	Voice; Season 1 episode 14: "Scooby-Doo Christmas"
2003	Fillmore!	O'Farrell's Mom	Voice; Season 1 episode 13: "A Forgotten Yesterday"
2003	CatDog	Brat	Voice; Season 3 episode 8: "Harasslin' Match/Dog the Not-So-Mighty"
2004	Green Screen Show	Herself	Episode #1.2
2007	My Name Is Earl	Officer Bowman	3 episodes
2009–2010	The Price Is Right	Mimi Bobeck	2 episodes
2009–2011	The Penguins of Madagascar	Rhonda	2 episodes
2009–2013	The Secret Life of the American Teenager	Bunny / Butcher Shop Lady	33 episodes
2011	Working Class	Dot	Episode 5: "Lunch Lady"
2011	Drew Carey's Improv-A-Ganza	Herself / Performer	19 episodes
2011	Love Bites	Karen	Episode 5: "Stand and Deliver"; Segment: "Not to Speak"
2016	Baby Daddy	Judy	Season 5 episode 15: "Unholy Matrimony"
2019	American Housewife	Lunch Lady	Season 4 episode 3: "Bigger Kids, Bigger Problems"
2020	Stumptown	Franny Lewis	Episode 12: "Dirty Dexy Money"
