= List of feminist podcasts =

Podcasts with feminist themes

This is a list of feminist podcasts.

== List ==
Podcast	Year	Style	Starring, Narrator(s), or Host(s)	Produced by	Ref
The History Chicks	2011–present		Beckett Graham and Susan Vollenweider	Headgum	
2 Dope Queens	2015–2018		Jessica Williams and Phoebe Robinson	WNYC Studios	
The Guilty Feminist	2015–present		Deborah Frances-White	The Spontaneity Shop	
Guys We Fucked	2015–present		Corinne Fisher and Krystyna Hutchinson		
Masala Podcast https://pod.link/1482206518	2020–present		The biggest South Asian feminist podcast in the world, created by Sangeeta Pillai https://www.soulsutras.co.uk/about-masala-podcast/		
Brown and Bold	2021–present				
Nancy	2017–2020		Kathy Tu and Tobin Low	WNYC Studios	
Call Your Girlfriend	2014–2022		Ann Friedman and Aminatou Sow		
The Receipts Podcast	2016–2019		Audrey, Tolly, and Milena Sanchez		
Why Won't You Date Me?	2017–present		Nicole Byer	HeadGum (2017-2021) Team Coco (2021-present)	
Feminist Frequency Radio	2017–present		Kat Spada and Anita Sarkeesian		
Women in Labour	2020–2022				
Death, Sex & Money	2020–present		Anna Sale	WNYC Studios	
Sooo Many White Guys	2016–2020		Phoebe Robinson	WNYC Studios	
Behanchara Diaries	2017		Safieh Shah and Zehra Naqvi	Girls at Dhabas	
Another Round	2015–2017		Tracy Clayton and Heben Nigatu	BuzzFeed	
Dirty Diana	2020		Demi Moore	QCode	
Feminist Mormon Housewives	2004		Lisa Butterworth		
How to Be a Girl	2014–2020		Marlo Mack	KUOW-FM	
Leading Ladies	2019		Samba Yonga		
Locatora Radio	2016–present		Diosa Femme and Mala Muñoz	iHeartPodcasts and Locatora Studios	
Maintenance Phase	2020–present		Aubrey Gordon and Michael Hobbes		
Mothers of Invention	2018–2020		Mary Robinson, Maeve Higgins, and Thimali Kodikara	Doc Society	
The Bechdel Cast	2016–present		Caitlin Durante and Jamie Loftus	iHeartRadio Network	
Thirst Aid Kit	2017–2021		Bim Adewunmi and Nichole Perkins	Slate Podcasts	
Verity!	2012–present		Erika Ensign, Katrina Griffiths, L.M. Myles, Tansy Rayner Roberts, Deborah Stanish, and Lynne M. Thomas		
You're Wrong About	2018–present		Sarah Marshall and Michael Hobbes		
Unladylike Podcast	2018–present		Cristen Conger	Cristen Conger	
Alright, Now What?	2021–present		Andrea Gunraj	Canadian Women's Foundation	
