= Storybound =

Literature and music podcast

- Genre: Literary; Narrative; Scripted; Music podcast
- Language: English

Cast and voices
- Hosted by: Jude Brewer

Technical specifications
- Audio format: Podcast (via streaming or downloadable MP3)

Publication
- No. of seasons: 5
- Original release: December 3, 2019
- Provider: Lit Hub; The Podglomerate
- Updates: Weekly

Storybound is a podcast created, produced, and hosted by Jude Brewer, with original music composed for each episode. The show is a collaboration between Lit Hub and The Podglomerate podcast network, featuring household names and Pulitzer Prize winning authors alongside relatively unknown bands, singer-songwriters, and composers. Season 1 debuted on December 3, 2019. Inspired from Brewer's Storytellers Telling Stories, Storybound surpassed a million downloads in its first year, following up with seasons 2 and 3, the latter of which has been recognized for experimental cross-genre music compositions with sampling created and arranged by Brewer.

== Series overview ==
Regarding the crafting of each episode, Brewer likened the relationship between literature and music as the conceptual evolution of a live reading, also adding how "beats or time signatures or chord progressions" allow listeners to feel a story's forward progression: "There's something subtle in your mind telling you, 'I'm going to get past this moment.'"

Storybound is noted for pairing award-winning and bestselling writers with comparatively unknown musicians, an idea spun out of Brewer's initial conception for Storytellers Telling Stories. Brewer had alluded to an uncertain future for Storytellers Telling Stories in as early as February 2019. Storybound was announced later that year at a live performance for the Literary Arts Portland Book Festival pre-show, Lit Crawl, where they also announced their sponsorship with Powell's Books.

Season 1 included critically acclaimed and bestselling authors such as Mitch Albom, Lidia Yuknavitch, Matt Gallagher, Kim Barnes, Adelle Waldman, Diksha Basu, Nathan Hill, Caitlin Doughty, Mitchell S. Jackson as well as a story told by Jack Rhysider, creator of the popular podcast Darknet Diaries. Seasons 2 and 3 continued this trend, expanding outside of its primary literary/memoir focus, featuring science fiction author Charlie Jane Anders, essayist Soraya Nadia McDonald, comic book writer Mark Russell, fiction writer Junot Díaz, and Pulitzer Prize winning critic, Soraya Nadia McDonald.

Along with authors such as Chuck Klosterman, Morgan Jerkins, Omar El Akkad, Matt Haig, and Tamara Winfrey Harris. Season 4 features more prominent musicians such as Portico Quartet, Dustin O'Halloran, Ben Folds, Jaymay, Au Revoir Simone, Fake Shark, Zola Jesus, The Bright Light Social Hour, and Shook Twins. Season 4 also includes a unique episode officially funded by a grant from the Regional Arts & Culture Council. The episode is a radio drama adaptation of playwright and screenwriter Brianna Barrett's historical fiction television pilot based on the life of Frances Fuller Victor, an American historian and novelist living in Civil War era San Francisco.

Season 5 was announced for 2022, bringing on Debbie Millman, Danté Stewart, Stephanie Foo, Tommy Davidson, Dan Chaon, Imogen Binnie, Daniel Olivas and more.

== Production ==
Each episode begins with an introduction from Brewer, followed by a lofi theme or, as Brewer has likened it, "bedroom-pop". Following Brewer's introduction, the featured author will read an excerpt from their upcoming book, prize-winning essay, or debut work.

For the first 10 episodes, Brewer was responsible for the arrangement and sound design, excluding episode 2 with Lidia Yuknavitch which was scored, arranged, and mixed entirely by Jake Whiston. Season 2 brought on regular contributor Tim Karplus as Storybound's Head Mixing Engineer, as season 3 marked a tonal change for the show, incorporating more experimental cross-genre music compositions with sampling created and arranged by Brewer. This notable musical shift followed Brewer wanting "to take on more of a defined shape as [they began] understanding [their] place within the dramatic podcast community".

Acclaimed non-profit Electric Literature covered Storybound in its Top 10 for podcasts "to listen to if you miss life before Quarantine", noting, "[Listen] if you miss: Going to the movie theater, sitting in a comfy seat, eating popcorn, and listening to other theatergoers murmur in the dark."

Season 5 marked a departure for the show's format, splicing conversations between Brewer and the guests alongside their readings.

== Episodes ==
=== Season 1 (2019) ===
| No. | Title | Length (minutes:seconds) | Original release date |
|---|---|---|---|
| 1 | "Mitch Albom reads an excerpt from Finding Chika" | 40:39 | December 3, 2019 |
Mitch Albom reads an excerpt from his forthcoming memoir Finding Chika, with music by Maiah Wynne.
| 2 | "Lidia Yuknavitch reads her short story "Street Walker"" | 42:16 | December 10, 2019 |
Lidia Yuknavitch reads her short story "Street Walker" from her upcoming collection Verge, with music, arrangement, and sound design by Whiston & Warmack.
| 3 | "Matt Gallagher reads his short story "Know Your Enemy: Celebrating 50 Years of the Forever War"" | 36:00 | December 17, 2019 |
Matt Gallagher reads his short story "Know Your Enemy", previously published in WIRED's fiction issue, with music by Colin Hogan.
| 4 | "Kim Barnes reads an excerpt from her memoir Hungry for the World" | 52:00 | January 7, 2020 |
Kim Barnes reads from Hungry for the World, with music by Pretty Gritty and Bryan Daste.
| 5 | "Jack Rhysider reads The Old Church of St. Louis" | 41:00 | January 14, 2020 |
Jack Rhysider, host of the Darknet Diaries podcast, reads an original essay, with music by Shane Brown.
| 6 | "Adelle Waldman reads an excerpt from her novel The Love Affairs of Nathaniel P." | 42:00 | January 21, 2020 |
Adelle Waldman reads from The Love Affairs of Nathaniel P., with music by Haley Johnsen.
| 7 | "Nathan Hill reads an excerpt from his novel The Nix" | 30:00 | January 28, 2020 |
Nathan Hill (writer) reads an excerpt from his novel The Nix with music and arrangement by Tim Karplus.
| 8 | "Diksha Basu reads an excerpt from her novel The Windfall" | 30:00 | February 4, 2020 |
Diksha Basu reads an excerpt from her novel The Windfall.
| 9 | "Caitlin Doughty reads an excerpt from her novel Will My Cat Eat My Eyeballs?" | 27:00 | February 11, 2020 |
Caitlin Doughty reads from Will My Cat Eat My Eyeballs?, with music by Stephanie Strange.
| 10 | "Mitchell S. Jackson reads an excerpt from his memoir Survival Math" | 65:00 | February 18, 2020 |
Mitchell S. Jackson reads from Survival Math, with music by Zane, Stephanie Strange, and Tim Karplus.

=== Season 2 (2020) ===
| No. | Title | Length (minutes:seconds) | Original release date |
|---|---|---|---|
| 1 | "Stephanie Danler reads an excerpt from her memoir Stray" | 37:00 | July 14, 2020 |
Stephanie Danler reads an excerpt from her memoir Stray, with music by Naomi LaViolette.
| 2 | "Tommy Orange reads his short story "Copperopolis"" | 33:00 | July 21, 2020 |
Tommy Orange reads his short story "Copperopolis", with music by Ryan Dann of Holland Patent Public Library.
| 3 | "Lauren Groff reads her short story "Flower Hunters"" | 30:00 | July 28, 2020 |
Lauren Groff reads her short story "Flower Hunters" from her short story collection Florida, with music by Naomi LaViolette.
| 4 | "Sopan Deb reads an excerpt from Missed Translations" | 44:00 | August 4, 2020 |
Sopan Deb reads an excerpt from Missed Translations with music by Jordan Holloman.
| 5 | "Chloe Caldwell reads her essay The Opposite of Light" | 34:00 | August 11, 2020 |
Gotham Writers' Workshop Chloe Caldwell reads her essay The Opposite of Light with music by Tony Kieraldo.
| 6 | "Garth Greenwell reads an excerpt from Cleanness" | 44:00 | August 18, 2020 |
Garth Greenwell reads an excerpt from Cleanness, with music by Ryan Dann of Holland Patent Public Library.
| 7 | "Megan Angelo reads an excerpt from Followers" | 26:00 | August 25, 2020 |
Megan Angelo reads an excerpt from Followers with music by Tim Karplus.
| 8 | "Amanda Stern reads an excerpt from Little Panic" | 43:00 | September 1, 2020 |
Amanda Stern reads an excerpt from her memoir Little Panic with music by Hayley Lynn.
| 9 | "Yaa Gyasi reads an excerpt from Transcendent Kingdom" | 42:00 | September 8, 2020 |
Yaa Gyasi reads an excerpt from her novel Transcendent Kingdom, with music by Tim Karplus.
| 10 | "Phil Klay reads an excerpt from Missionaries" | 43:00 | September 15, 2020 |
Phil Klay reads an excerpt from his novel Missionaries, with music by Tim Karplus.
| 11 | "Stephanie Danler reads (another) excerpt from her memoir Stray" | 22:00 | October 13, 2020 |
Stephanie Danler reads a second excerpt from her memoir Stray, with music by Tim Karplus.
| 12 | "Ruth Reichl reads "Letters to the Editor" from Thanksgiving issues of Gourmet Magazine" | 27:00 | November 17, 2020 |
Ruth Reichl reads "Letters to the Editor" from Thanksgiving issues of Gourmet Magazine, with music by Tim Karplus.

=== Season 3 (2020) ===
| No. | Title | Length (minutes:seconds) | Original release date |
|---|---|---|---|
| 1 | "Junot Díaz reads "Aurora"" | 50:00 | December 8, 2020 |
Junot Díaz reads his short story "Aurora", with music sampled from Y La Bamba.
| 2 | "Madhuri Vijay reads an excerpt from The Far Field" | 26:00 | December 15, 2020 |
Madhuri Vijay reads an excerpt from her novel The Far Field, with music sampled from French Cassettes.
| 3 | "Andy Greenberg reads an excerpt from Sandworm" | 31:00 | December 22, 2020 |
Andy Greenberg of WIRED reads an excerpt from his book Sandworm, with music by Daniel Frankhuizen of Locator.
| 4 | "Charlie Jane Anders reads an excerpt from Victories Greater Than Death" | 40:00 | January 5, 2021 |
Charlie Jane Anders reads an excerpt from Victories Greater Than Death, with music sampled from Oginalii.
| 5 | "Paul Lisicky reads an excerpt from Later" | 40:00 | January 12, 2021 |
Paul Lisicky reads an excerpt from Later: My Life at the Edge of the World, with music sampled from Jordan Warmack.
| 6 | "Noé Álvarez reads an excerpt from Spirit Run" | 37:00 | January 19, 2021 |
Noé Álvarez reads an excerpt from Spirit Run, with music by Daniel Frankhuizen of Locator.
| 7 | "Jason Diamond reads an excerpt from The Sprawl" | 39:00 | January 26, 2021 |
Jason Diamond reads an excerpt from The Sprawl, focusing on the legacy of Anthony Bourdain, with music sampled from Xander Marsden.
| 8 | "Soraya Nadia McDonald reads "Wandering In Search of Wakanda"" | 38:00 | February 2, 2021 |
Soraya Nadia McDonald reads her essay "Wandering In Search of Wakanda", originally published on The Undefeated, with music sampled from Marco Pavé.
| 9 | "Shayla Lawson reads "Black Lives Matter, Yard Signs Matter"" | 42:00 | February 9, 2021 |
Shayla Lawson reads "Black Lives Matter, Yard Signs Matter", an excerpt from her book This Is Major, with music sampled from MAITA.
| 10 | "Deesha Philyaw reads The Secret Lives of Church Ladies" | 41:00 | February 16, 2021 |
Deesha Philyaw reads from her book The Secret Lives of Church Ladies, with music sampled from Gil Assayas of GLASYS.
| 11 | "Robert Jones Jr. reads an excerpt of The Prophets" | 40:00 | February 23, 2021 |
Robert Jones Jr. reads from his debut novel The Prophets, with music sampled from Josh Garrels.
| 12 | "Mark Russell reads from his comic Second Coming" | 29:00 | March 2, 2021 |
Mark Russell reads from his comic Second Coming.
| 13 | "Laurie Frankel reads an excerpt of One Two Three" | 32:00 | March 9, 2021 |
Laurie Frankel reads an excerpt from her novel One Two Three, with music sampled from Anna Tivel.
| 14 | "Shayla Lawson reads an excerpt from This Is Major" | 29:00 | March 23, 2021 |
Shayla Lawson reads a second excerpt from her book This Is Major.
| 15 | "Madhuri Vijay reads an excerpt from The Far Field" | 26:00 | May 4, 2021 |
Madhuri Vijay reads a second excerpt from her book The Far Field.
| 16 | "Laurie Frankel reads an excerpt from One, Two, Three" | 27:00 | May 18, 2021 |
Laurie Frankel reads a second excerpt from her novel One Two Three.

=== Season 4 (2021) ===
| No. | Title | Length (minutes:seconds) | Original release date |
|---|---|---|---|
| 1 | "Chuck Klosterman reads an excerpt from Raised in Captivity: Fictional Nonfiction" | 28:00 | June 8, 2021 |
Chuck Klosterman reads an excerpt from Raised in Captivity: Fictional Nonfiction, backed by an original Storybound remix with Portico Quartet, and sound design and arrangement by Jude Brewer.
| 2 | "Morgan Jerkins reads an excerpt from Caul Baby" | 31:00 | June 15, 2021 |
Morgan Jerkins reads an excerpt from her book Caul Baby, backed by an original Storybound remix with French Cassettes, and sound design and arrangement by Jude Brewer.
| 3 | "Matt Haig reads an excerpt from The Midnight Library" | 32:00 | June 22, 2021 |
Matt Haig reads an excerpt from The Midnight Library, backed by an original Storybound remix with Robert Wynia, and sound design and arrangement by Jude Brewer.
| 4 | "Nichole Perkins reads an excerpt from Sometimes I Trip On How Happy We Could Be" | 38:00 | June 29, 2021 |
Nichole Perkins reads an excerpt from Sometimes I Trip on How Happy We Could Be, backed by an original Storybound remix with Dustin O'Halloran, and sound design and arrangement by Jude Brewer.
| 5 | "Omar El Akkad reads excerpts from "American War" and "What Strange Paradise"" | 32:00 | July 6, 2021 |
Omar El Akkad reads excerpts from American War and What Strange Paradise, backed by an original Storybound remix, and sound design and arrangement by Jude Brewer.
| 6 | "Tamara Winfrey-Harris reads an excerpt from Dear Black Girl: Letters From Your Sisters on Stepping Into Your Power" | 34:00 | July 13, 2021 |
Tamara Winfrey-Harris reads an excerpt from Dear Black Girl: Letters From Your Sisters on Stepping Into Your Power, backed by an original Storybound remix with Au Revoir Simone, and sound design and arrangement by Jude Brewer.
| 7 | "Joseph Fink and Meg Bashwiner read excerpts from The First Ten Years" | 59:00 | July 20, 2021 |
Joseph Fink and Meg Bashwiner from Welcome to Nightvale read excerpts from The First Ten Years, backed by an original Storybound remix with Fake Shark, and sound design and arrangement by Jude Brewer.
| 8 | "Scott Nadelson reads his short story Liberté" | 41:00 | July 27, 2021 |
Scott Nadelson reads his short story "Liberté", backed by an original Storybound remix with Mount Comfort, and sound design and arrangement by Jude Brewer.
| 9 | "Ruth Wariner reads an excerpt from The Sound of Gravel" | 37:00 | August 3, 2021 |
Ruth Wariner reads an excerpt from The Sound of Gravel, backed by an original Storybound remix with Shook Twins, and sound design and arrangement by Jude Brewer.
| 10 | "Anna Reeser reads her short story, Octopus VII" | 41:00 | August 10, 2021 |
Anna Reeser reads her short story, "Octopus VII", backed by an original Storybound remix with The Bright Light Social Hour, and sound design and arrangement by Jude Brewer.
| 11 | "Myriam Gurba reads her story, Writing Ourselves Into Bed" | 49:00 | August 17, 2021 |
Myriam Gurba reads her story Writing Ourselves Into Bed, backed by an original Storybound remix with Zola Jesus, and sound design and arrangement by Jude Brewer.
| 12 | "Meng Jin reads an excerpt from her story In the Event" | 44:00 | August 24, 2021 |
Meng Jin reads an excerpt from her story In the Event, backed by an original Storybound remix, and sound design and arrangement by Jude Brewer.
| 13 | "William Pei Shih reads an excerpt from The Enlightenment" | 43:00 | August 31, 2021 |
William Pei Shih reads an excerpt from The Enlightenment, backed by an original Storybound remix with Modern Diet, and sound design and arrangement by Jude Brewer.
| 14 | "Jane Pek reads an excerpt from her short story "Portrait of Two Young Ladies in White and Green Robes (Unidentified Artist, Circa Sixteenth Century)"" | 36:00 | September 7, 2021 |
Jane Pek reads an excerpt from her story "Portrait of Two Young Ladies in White and Green Robes (Unidentified Artist, Circa Sixteenth Century)", backed by an original Storybound remix with Daniel Frankhuizen, and sound design and arrangement by Jude Brewer.
| 15 | "Sarah Thankam Mathews reads her short story Rubberdust" | 33:00 | September 14, 2021 |
Sarah Thankam Mathews reads her story Rubberdust, backed by an original Storybound remix, and sound design and arrangement by Jude Brewer.
| 16 | "Leigh Newman reads her short story "Howl Palace"" | 42:00 | September 21, 2021 |
Leigh Newman reads her story "Howl Palace", backed by an original Storybound remix, and sound design and arrangement by Jude Brewer.
| 17 | "Marian Crotty reads her short story, "Halloween"" | 49:00 | September 28, 2021 |
Marian Crotty reads her short story "Halloween", backed by an original Storybound remix with My Son the Doctor, and sound design and arrangement by Jude Brewer.
| 18 | "Elizabeth McCracken reads her short story, "It's Not You"" | 42:00 | October 5, 2021 |
Elizabeth McCracken reads her short story, "It's Not You", backed by an original Storybound remix with Moon Hound, and sound design and arrangement by Jude Brewer.
| 19 | "Jason Brown reads his story, A Faithful but Melancholy Account of Several Barbarities Lately Committed" | 38:00 | November 2, 2021 |
Jason Brown reads his story, A Faithful but Melancholy Account of Several Barbarities Lately Committed, backed by an original Storybound remix with Mattias Tell, and sound design and arrangement by Jude Brewer.
| 20 | "Dawnie Walton reads an excerpt from The Final Revival of Opal & Nev" | 41:00 | November 9, 2021 |
Dawnie Walton reads an excerpt from The Final Revival of Opal & Nev, backed by an original Storybound remix, and sound design and arrangement by Jude Brewer.
| 21 | "Clint Smith reads an excerpt from How the Word Is Passed" | 37:00 | November 30, 2021 |
Clint Smith reads an excerpt from How the Word Is Passed, backed by an original Storybound remix with Taber Arias, and sound design and arrangement by Jude Brewer.
| 22 | "Jude Brewer's award-winning Buzzy" | 10:00 | December 7, 2021 |
Jude Brewer's first-place-winning Buzzy for the 2021 KCRW Radio Race.
| 23 | "Tamara Winfrey-Harris reads an excerpt from Dear Black Girl: Letters From Your Sisters on Stepping Into Your Power." | 26:00 | December 21, 2021 |
Tamara Winfrey-Harris reads an excerpt from Dear Black Girl: Letters From Your Sisters on Stepping Into Your Power, backed by an original Storybound remix, and sound design and arrangement by Jude Brewer.
| 24 | "Brianna Barrett presents Florence Fane in San Francisco" | 51:00 | January 4, 2022 |
Brianna Barrett presents Florence Fane in San Francisco, backed by an original Storybound remix with Jaymay, and sound design and arrangement by Jude Brewer.
| 25 | "Chuck Klosterman reads two stories from Raised in Captivity: Fictional Nonfiction" | 42:00 | January 11, 2022 |
Chuck Klosterman reads two stories from Raised in Captivity: Fictional Nonfiction, backed by an original Storybound remix with Lindsey Bitson, and sound design and arrangement by Jude Brewer.

=== Season 5 (2022) ===
| No. | Title | Length (minutes:seconds) | Original release date |
|---|---|---|---|
| 1 | "Debbie Millman discusses her book Why Design Matters, featuring David Byrne, Saeed Jones, Ira Glass, and more" | 48:00 | March 8, 2022 |
Debbie Millman discusses her book Why Design Matters, featuring David Byrne, Saeed Jones, Ira Glass, Brene Brown, and Aminatou Sow.
| 2 | "Danté Stewart reads an excerpt from Shoutin' In The Fire: An American Epistle" | 37:00 | March 15, 2022 |
Danté Stewart reads an excerpt from Shoutin' In The Fire: An American Epistle, backed by an original Storybound remix with sound design and arrangement by Jude Brewer.
| 3 | "Daniel A. Olivas reads an excerpt from How to Date a Flying Mexican" | 51:00 | March 22, 2022 |
Daniel Olivas reads an excerpt from How to Date a Flying Mexican, backed by an original Storybound remix with sound design and arrangement by Jude Brewer.
| 4 | "Tommy Tomlinson reads an excerpt from The Elephant in the Room: One Fat Man's Quest to Get Smaller in a Growing America" | 54:00 | March 29, 2022 |
Tommy Tomlinson reads an excerpt from The Elephant in the Room: One Fat Man's Quest to Get Smaller in a Growing America, backed by an original Storybound remix with sound design and arrangement by Jude Brewer.
| 5 | "Andrew Lipstein reads excerpts from Last Resort" | 41:00 | April 5, 2022 |
Andrew Lipstein reads excerpts from Last Resort, backed by an original Storybound remix with sound design and arrangement by Jude Brewer.
| 6 | "Melissa Chadburn reads from her essay The Throwaways" | 38:00 | April 12, 2022 |
Melissa Chadburn reads from her essay The Throwaways, backed by an original Storybound remix with sound design and arrangement by Jude Brewer.
| 7 | "Anna Sale talks about her book Let's Talk About Hard Things" | 49:00 | April 19, 2022 |
Anna Sale of Death, Sex and Money talks about her book Let's Talk About Hard Things, backed by an original Storybound remix with sound design and arrangement by Jude Brewer.
| 8 | "Kim Kelly discusses her book Fight Like Hell: The Untold History of American Labor" | 35:00 | April 26, 2022 |
Kim Kelly discusses her book Fight Like Hell: The Untold History of American Labor, backed by an original Storybound remix with sound design and arrangement by Jude Brewer.
| 9 | "Phil Klay reads his essay The Citizen-Soldier: Moral Risk and the Modern Military" | 50:00 | May 3, 2022 |
Phil Klay reads his essay The Citizen-Soldier: Moral Risk and the Modern Military, backed by an original Storybound remix with sound design and arrangement by Jude Brewer.
| 10 | "Stephanie Foo reads an excerpt from What My Bones Know" | 32:00 | May 10, 2022 |
Stephanie Foo reads an excerpt from What My Bones Know, backed by an original Storybound remix with sound design and arrangement by Jude Brewer.
| 11 | "Daniel Sherrell reads excerpts from his book Warmth" | 40:00 | May 17, 2022 |
Daniel Sherrell reads excerpts from his book Warmth, backed by an original Storybound remix with sound design and arrangement by Jude Brewer.
| 12 | "Antoine Wilson reads from his new book Mouth to Mouth" | 55:00 | May 31, 2022 |
Antoine Wilson reads from his new book Mouth to Mouth, backed by an original Storybound remix with sound design and arrangement by Jude Brewer.
| 13 | "Dan Chaon reads an excerpt from his new book Sleepwalk" | 48:00 | June 14, 2022 |
Dan Chaon reads an excerpt from his new book Sleepwalk, backed by an original Storybound remix with sound design and arrangement by Jude Brewer.
| 14 | "Benjamín Labatut reads an excerpt from When We Cease to Understand the World" | 58:00 | June 28, 2022 |
Benjamín Labatut reads an excerpt from When We Cease to Understand the World, backed by an original Storybound remix with sound design and arrangement by Jude Brewer.
| 15 | "Vauhini Vara reads an excerpt from The Immortal King Rao" | 56:00 | July 5, 2022 |
Vauhini Vara reads an excerpt from The Immortal King Rao, backed by an original Storybound remix with sound design and arrangement by Jude Brewer.
| 16 | "Imogen Binnie reads an excerpt from Nevada" | 33:00 | July 12, 2022 |
Imogen Binnie reads an excerpt from Nevada, backed by an original Storybound remix with sound design and arrangement by Jude Brewer.
| 17 | "Daniel Abraham reads an excerpt from Age of Ash" | 31:00 | July 19, 2022 |
Daniel Abraham (author) reads an excerpt from Age of Ash, backed by an original Storybound remix with sound design and arrangement by Jude Brewer.
| 18 | "Tommy Davidson reads an excerpt from Living in Color" | 22:00 | July 27, 2022 |
Tommy Davidson reads an excerpt from Living in Color, backed by an original Storybound remix with sound design and arrangement by Jude Brewer.

== See also ==
- Music podcast
