= Storytellers Telling Stories =

Narrated short stories podcast

- Genre: Literary; Narrative; Scripted; Music podcast

Cast and voices
- Hosted by: Jude Brewer

Production
- Length: Averaging 30 minutes

Technical specifications
- Audio format: MP3

Publication
- No. of seasons: 2
- No. of episodes: 46
- Original release: August 22, 2017 – August 14, 2019

Storytellers Telling Stories is an episodic podcast created and hosted by writer and showrunner Jude Brewer, harkening back to the Golden Age of Radio as a "theatre of the mind" experience with writers, actors, and musicians. Consolidated into seasons and released weekly, the episodes range from just a few minutes to about an hour, with most hovering around the 30-minute mark, beginning with Brewer introducing the title of the story and that episode's featured author. The stories are either fiction or nonfiction, exploring a wide array of storytelling genres, from literary fiction to science fiction to magical realism, and noir fiction.

The first season consists entirely of authors reading short stories or excerpts from their published books. The second season introduces a featured songwriter for each episode, where the songwriter will play a live version of their song that loosely ties in with the story and the Season Two theme of "Endings". Brewer hosted a live performance of the podcast at the Literary Arts Portland Book Festival pre-show, Lit Crawl, for Season Two, featuring Kevin Sampsell, Margaret Malone, Tabitha Blankenbiller, Jennifer Robin, Brianna Barrett, and The Colin Trio.

Some notable appearances on the show are singer-songwriter, John Craigie, musician, Laura Hall, and comic book writer, Mark Russell. Several prominent authors have also been featured, among them being Monica Drake, Kevin Sampsell, Tammy Stoner, and Gina Ochsner. Season Two also features Luz from the Tender Loving Empire band, Y La Bamba.

The opening theme of the podcast begins with Brewer explaining the many different ways that listeners can experience a podcast, either through phone speakers, a car stereo, or earbuds. Two episodes introductions have deviated from this format, both episodes credited with Brewer as the featured performer. The finale for Season Two deviates the most, both lacking the show's intro music and featuring an extended monologue from Brewer.

The musical score for each episode in Season Two generally utilizes warped and distorted instruments sourced from the featured musician's song.

== 2019: series finale and Storybound ==
The finale for Season Two is referred to as the "series finale" by Brewer, highlighting multiple storytellers from both seasons. The finale features 27 voices reading the work of author Traci Foust, as Foust had died the previous year.

A "surprise unveiling" and "major announcement" was rumored for Lit Crawl 2019, listing performers from the previous two seasons.

On October 22, 2019, Lit Hub announced a partnership with The Podglomerate, launching Storybound, a new podcast created and hosted by Brewer. Season One includes musicians who originally appeared on Storytellers Telling Stories, alongside critically acclaimed and bestselling authors such as Mitch Albom, Lidia Yuknavitch, Matt Gallagher, Kim Barnes, Adelle Waldman, Diksha Basu, Nathan Hill, Caitlin Doughty, as well as a story told by Jack Rhysider, creator of the popular podcast Darknet Diaries.

The new show aired December 3, exploring "everything from family life to friendship, relationships to histories, and how everything in life can be impacted by the power of a good story."

== Episodes ==
No.	Title	Duration	Released
S1:Ep.1	The Beast – ft. Kate Ristau	0:08:48	March 10, 2017
S1:Ep.2	The Curtain, The Needle, The Lantern, and the Piglet – ft. Jason Arias	0:15:27	October 10, 2017
S1:Ep.3	Itzá – ft. Rios de la Luz	0:12:21	Oct 17, 2017
S1:Ep.4	Love & Other Action Words – ft. DeAngelo Gillispie & Shane Brown	0:15:29	Oct 24, 2017
S1:Ep.5	Dark Shadows 1970 – ft. David Ciminello	0:14:04	Oct 31, 2017
S1:Ep.6	Narrow River, Wide Sky – ft. Jenny Forrester	0:15:19	July 11, 2017
S1:Ep.7	Summer of Slim – ft. Zach Ellis	0:15:43	Nov 14, 2017
S1:Ep.8	Heller – ft. Domi Shoemaker	0:13:50	Nov 21, 2017
S1:Ep.9	The Great Invader – ft. Daniel Elder	0:25:48	Nov 28, 2017
S1:Ep.10	Nothing to Forgive – ft. Kate Gray	0:14:01	May 12, 2017
S1:Ep.11	The Harvest – ft. Reema Zaman	0:30:17	December 12, 2017
S1:Ep.12	New York City And All That – ft. Davis Slater & Mark Bowden	0:37:09	Dec 19, 2017
S1:Ep.13	No-See-Ums – ft. Paul E. Lapier	0:09:27	Dec 26, 2017
S1:Ep.14	Still Clutching Maps – ft. Christina Butcher	0:13:45	September 1, 2018
S1:Ep.15	The Art Gallery – ft. Geronimo Tagatac	0:23:56	Jan 16, 2018
S1:Ep.16	Elegy in Water – ft. Gina Ochsner	0:20:41	Jan 23, 2018
S1:Ep.17	Baptism by Fire – ft. James A. Gilletti	0:39:05	Jan 30, 2018
S1:Ep.18	Barefoot in the Guadalupe – ft. Samuel Snoek-Brown	0:26:38	June 2, 2018
S1:Ep.19	Star Crunch – ft. Kate Ristau	0:09:35	Feb 13, 2018
S1:Ep.20	Broken Man – ft. Sean Davis	0:38:15	Feb 20, 2018
S1:Ep.21	We Didn't Know What Was Happening – ft. Jude Brewer	0:16:22	Feb 27, 2018
S2:Ep.1	I Don't Know What Heaven's Like – ft. Rick Hall & Laura Hall	0:28:08	Nov 13, 2018
S2:Ep.2	The Folly of Loving Life – ft. Monica Drake & Katelyn Convery	0:31:54	Nov 20, 2018
S2:Ep.3	Death Becomes Her: The Morbid Nonfiction of Jennifer Robin – ft. Colin Hogan	0:22:19	Nov 27, 2018
S2:Ep.4	Lifestyles of the Unrich and Nonfamous – ft. Brianna Barrett & Haley Johnsen	0:20:48	April 12, 2018
S2:Ep.5	The Instruction – ft. Margaret Malone & Hayley Lynn	0:21:14	November 12, 2018
S2:Ep.6	Blue Lips & Bloodstains – ft. Stephanie Strange	0:16:24	Dec 18, 2018
S2:Ep.7	Possum – ft. Genevieve Hudson & Luz of Y La Bamba	0:14:55	August 1, 2019
S2:Ep.8	Mugger – ft. Kevin Sampsell & Joshua Rivera	0:15:22	Jan 15, 2019
S2:Ep.9	We're Live! ft. Tabitha Blankenbiller, Jennifer Robin, Kevin Sampsell, Margaret Malone, Brianna Barrett, and The Colin Trio	0:43:19	Jan 22, 2019
S2:Ep.10	Say What You Will – ft. Jude Brewer & Karyn Ann	0:08:32	Jan 29, 2019
S2:Ep.11	Saved – ft. Felicity Fenton	0:12:06	Feb 19, 2019
S2:Ep.12	The Oscar Wilde Way – ft. Tammy Stoner & Pretty Gritty	0:18:07	Feb 26, 2019
S2:Ep.13	The Soft No – ft. Kimberly King Parsons & Fox and Bones	0:19:43	May 3, 2019
S2:Ep.14	Endings – ft. John Craigie	0:16:40	December 3, 2019
S2:Ep.15	Cousin Kay – ft. Michael Shou-Yung Shum & Talk Station	0:17:41	Mar 19, 2019
S2:Ep.16	I Only Cry With Emoticons – ft. Yuvi Zalkow & Corinne Sharlet	0:26:19	February 4, 2019
S2:Ep.17	The Fixer – ft. Adam Strong & Margaret Wehr	0:36:31	September 4, 2019
S2:Ep.18	Her Own Special Touch – ft. Jackie Shannon Hollis & Redwood Son	0:22:20	Apr 18, 2019
S2:Ep.19	My Cable Access TV Show – ft. Mark Russell & J Graves	0:21:27	Apr 25, 2019
S2:Ep.20	Twitch – ft. Suzy Vitello & Annachristie Sapphire	0:25:25	June 6, 2019
S2:Ep.21	Shape and Slope – ft. Mo Daviau & Laryssa Birdseye	0:16:36	Jun 21, 2019
S2:Ep.22	Another Way In – ft. Tabitha Blankenbiller & Moses Barrett	0:18:25	Jul 25, 2019
S2:Ep.23	Stories Never End – ft. Joanna Rose & Christopher Worth	0:12:21	January 8, 2019
S2:Ep.24	The Isle of the Dead – ft. Stevan Allred & Shane Brown	0:24:10	August 8, 2019
S2:Ep.25	Nowhere Near Normal – ft. Traci Foust & Maiah Wynne	0:37:58	Aug 15, 2019

== See also ==
- Music podcast
