= Jude Brewer =

American writer, actor, and producer

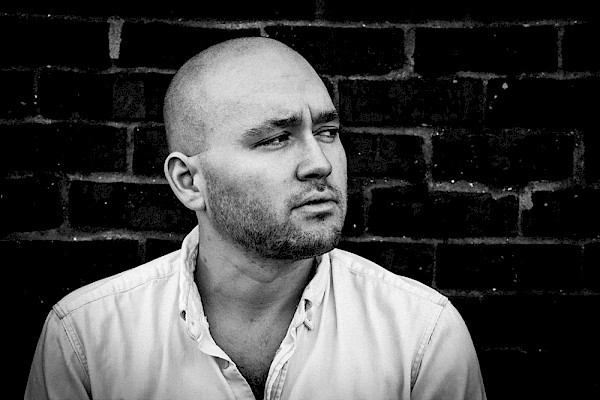
- Born: June 13, 1989 (age 37); Walnut Creek, California U.S.
- Occupations: Writer, actor
- Known for: Storybound and Storytellers Telling Stories
- Website: Official website

Jude Brewer is an American writer, producer, actor, and podcast host, best known for creating and hosting Storybound and Storytellers Telling Stories. Brewer's writing has appeared in literary magazines, podcasts and short films.

== Career ==
Around early 2017, Brewer launched John Plays the Piano, a roundtable film discussion podcast, breaking down and analyzing classic films such as Brazil, Being John Malkovich, and Small Soldiers. Eight episodes were released. Brewer has said John Plays the Piano is on an "indefinite hiatus".

In October 2017, Brewer launched the Storytellers Telling Stories podcast as a means to take a break from writing. The show has been described as an audio drama "pushing the evolution" of podcasting. The initial concept was to simulate a movie within the listener's mind. Storytellers Telling Stories wrapped with its series finale in August 2019, bringing together 27 different writers reading the work of author Traci Foust, as Foust had died the previous year.

In October 2019, Lit Hub announced a partnership with The Podglomerate, launching the Storybound, a podcast created, produced, and hosted by Brewer. The show would explore "family life to friendship, relationships to histories, and how everything in life can be impacted by the power of a good story". Season one was sponsored by Powell's Books, including musicians who originally appeared on Storytellers Telling Stories, alongside authors Mitch Albom, Lidia Yuknavitch, Matt Gallagher, Kim Barnes, Adelle Waldman, Diksha Basu, Nathan Hill, Caitlin Doughty, Mitchell S. Jackson, as well as a story told by Jack Rhysider, creator of the podcast Darknet Diaries. Season 3 incorporated more experimental cross-genre music compositions with sampling created and arranged by Brewer. Storybound season 4 continued to expand and build upon the show's experimental shift, crediting Brewer for "original Storybound remixes" as well as sound design and arrangement. Season 5 was announced for 2022.

In 2021, Brewer was awarded first place in the KCRW Radio Race, saying "Beyond the piece's beautifully crafted audio design and editing, Brewer wields sound as a character unto itself, taking the listener inside its ability to trigger — and sustain — memories of halcyon days spent perfecting kickflips after school and revelling in the unwritten possibilities and potential of youth."

== Awards ==
- 2017 UK Retreat West Flash Fiction Prize
- 2021 First Place, BUZZY, KCRW's Radio Race

== Bibliography ==
=== Audio adaptations ===
- BUZZY - KCRW's Radio Race (2021) & Storybound, Season 4 (2021)
- Say What You Will - Storytellers Telling Stories, Season 2, Episode 10 (2019)
- We Didn't Know What Was Happening - Storytellers Telling Stories, Season 1, Episode 21 (2018)

=== Film ===
- Your Heart is Mine (2020)

=== Short fiction ===
- "Say What You Will" - Stephen O'Donnell's The Untold Gaze (2018)
- "Thank You" - Typishly Magazine (2017)
- "Job #18 Divinity" - The Clackamas Literary Review, 20th Anniversary Issue (2017)
- "While My Wife Is Out Of Town" - Retreat West's Impermanent Facts (2017)
- "The Has Been, The Dancer, The Invader" - Scintilla Press Magazine, Issue 10 (2016)
