= PWN =

Pwn is an Internet slang term meaning to "own" or to "outdo" someone or something.

== Pwn or its derivations may also refer to ==
- Gaming-pwnage, video game culture slang for beating someone at video games
- Pwnage, the online identity of Samuel Anderson-Anderson, the protagonist in Nathan Hill's novel The Nix (2017)
- Pwnie Awards

== PWN may refer to ==
- Patras Wireless Network, a wireless community network, operating in Patras, Greece
- Person with narcolepsy, as abbreviated by narcolepsy chat and support groups
- Phrack World News, a service of Phrack magazine
- Polish Scientific Publishers PWN (Wydawnictwo Naukowe PWN; until 1991 National Scientific Publishers PWN, PWN – Państwowe Wydawnictwo Naukowe), a Polish book publisher
- Pro Wrestling Noah, a pro wrestling promotion
- Pulsar wind nebula, an astronomical phenomenon

== pwn may refer to ==
- Paiwan language (ISO 639-3).

== See also ==
- Owned
- PowNed
