= Kevin Sampsell =

American writer

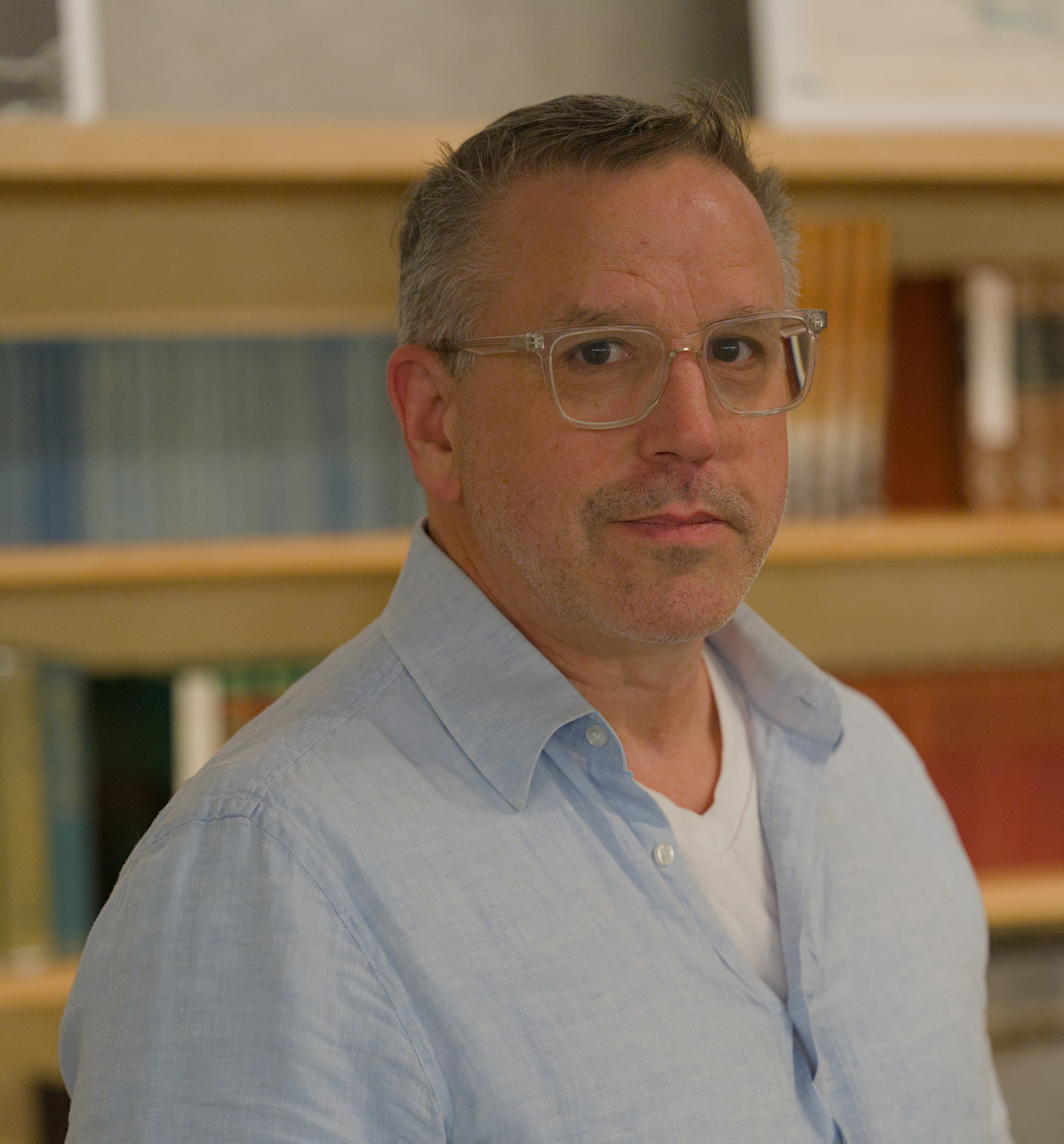
- Kevin Sampsell
- Born: Kennewick, Washington
- Occupations: Writer, publisher, bookseller
- Website: kevinsampsell.com

Kevin Sampsell (born March 17, 1967) is an American writer living in Portland, Oregon. He has worked at Powell's Book Store since 1998 as an events coordinator and the head of the small press section. His memoir, A Common Pornography, was published by Harper Perennial in January 2010. Tin House published his novel, This Is Between Us (2013), about a man and woman, both divorced, trying to start a life together. His collection of collage art and poems, I Made an Accident, was published by Clash Books in summer of 2022. In 2024, Sampsell released a picture book, "Sean the Stick", illustrated by Emma Jon-Michael Frank. His 2nd novel, Baby in the Night, is being published by Impeller Press in 2026. Sampsell also started and co-produced Lit Hop, a one-night, multiple-venue reading event in Portland, Oregon. It happened from 2013 to 2016. He curates and hosts another event promoting small publishers and small press writers, Smallpressapalooza, every March at Powell's Bookstore in Portland, Oregon.

== Writing ==
His short fiction has been published in literary journals such as Quick Fiction, LIT, Hobart, and Opium Magazine and on the websites McSweeney's, Nerve, The Elephants, Wigleaf, The Collagist, Failbetter, Pindeldyboz, and Night Train. He is the editor of Portland Noir and The Insomniac Reader and the author of two-story collections, Beautiful Blemish and Creamy Bullets as well as a memoir, "A Common Pornography" (HarperCollins) and a novel, "This Is Between Us" (Tin House Books). His nonfiction has been published in Poets & Writers Magazine, Relix, Portland Monthly, The Rumpus, Longreads, Plit Lip Magazine, Salon, Best Sex Writing 2010, Best American Essays 2013, and the Associated Press. Sampsell was also part of a performance group called Haiku Inferno (with Frank D'Andrea, Elizabeth Miller, and B Frayn Masters) from 2004 to 2009. Their performances of "rapid fire haiku" happened at literary festivals, bars, and a few times at Voodoo Doughnuts. One of Sampsell's most popular pieces of writing is I'm Jumping Off the Bridge in 2013. It was published by Salon and then appeared in Best American Essays.

In 2019, Sampsell appeared on Storytellers Telling Stories, reading his short fiction piece Mugger, accompanied by singer-songwriter, Joshua Rivera.

== Publishing ==
He has been the publisher of Future Tense Books since 1990. Representative authors include Elizabeth Ellen, Garielle Lutz, Myriam Gurba, Mike Topp, Chelsea Hodson, Shane Allison, Jamie Iredell, Wendy C. Ortiz, Meredith Alling, Tatiana Ryckman, Sommer Browning, May-Lan Tan, Shane Kowalski, Parker Young, Emilly Prado, Hillary Leftwich, Michael Seidlinger, Elissa Washuta, and Troy James Weaver. In 2016 he published a story collection by Monica Drake. While teaching an after-school writing class, Sampsell met 14-year-old Zoe Trope and published her journal entries as a 44-page chapbook called, Please Don't Kill The Freshman in 2001. Fast sales of the chapbook led to an expanded version published by HarperTempest in October 2003.

== Collage Art ==
Since early 2014, Sampsell started making collage art and has been heavily involved in promoting the art form through a column on The Rumpus website and in published articles elsewhere. He also hosted a monthly collage night that is open to the public at the Independent Publishing Resource Center in Portland and contributes to Kolaj Magazine. A book of his collages, I Made an Accident, is being published by Clash Books in 2022. He was interviewed about the collages in 2021 by Gertrude Press.
