= Tech LadyMafia =

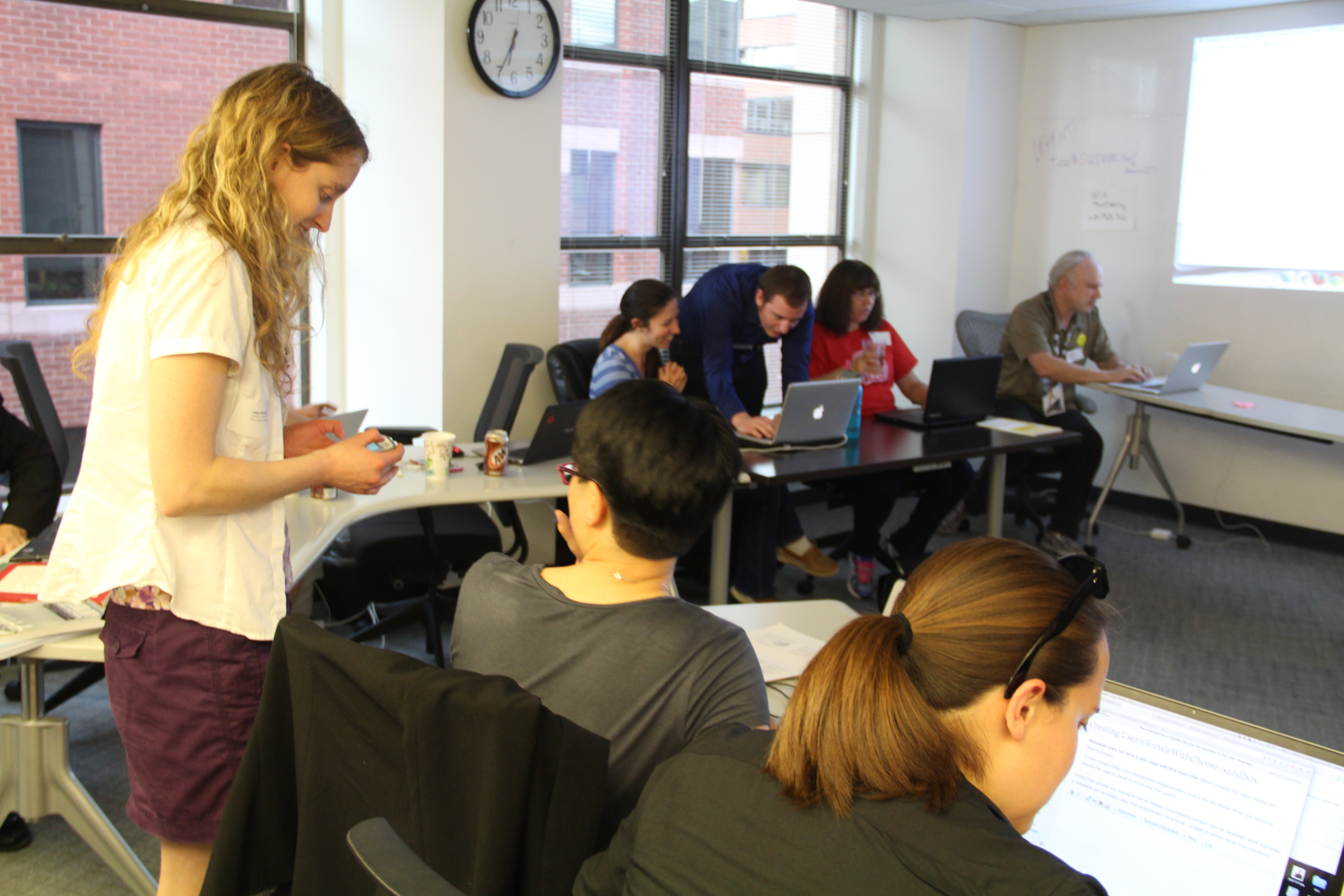
A Tech LadyMafia organized "edit-a-thon" in 2015.

Tech LadyMafia is a membership-based group of women in technology founded in 2011 by Aminatou Sow and Erie Meyer. The group was founded in part to increase visibility of women working in technology in response to popular articles about the lack of gender diversity.

The group aims to encourage women to share and express ideas using current technologies. Its mailing lists have over 2,000 members; they are used for asking advice, posting and finding jobs, and a "brag" list for sharing successes. The group also organizes in-person events, including networking meetups and technical trainings.

Sow moderates discussions on gender using the group as her platform.
