= Linda Taylor (musician) =

- Origin: Los Angeles, California, United States
- Genres: Various
- Occupation: Musician
- Instruments: Guitar, bass, keyboards
- Formerly of: Threshold

Linda Taylor is an American musician. As a session guitarist she has worked with artists such as Terri Lyne Carrington, Al Daniels, Laura Hall, Cece Peniston and Maia Sharp.

== Background ==
According to an interview with Shoutout LA, she started playing guitar when she was three. She also said her parents made sure that she started with guitar lessons. She was taught by Mrs. Boslow who taught her to read and count along. She also said that when other kids were learning "Stairway to Heaven" she was buying sheet music.

For twenty years, she was the guitarist on Whose Line Is It Anyway?, hosted by Drew Carey and, later, Aisha Tyler.

Artists that she has toured, recorded and/or performed with include Art Garfunkel, Terri Lyne Carrington, Tracy Chapman, Sheila E., Christopher Cross, Sara Niemietz, Crystal Bowersox, Edwin McCain, Don Was, Jim Keltner, Thelma Houston, Maia Sharp, Marilyn McCoo, Richard Perry, Kirk Whalum, and Namie Amuro.

She is also a contributor to the Guitar Chalk magazine, and has written articles for Recording magazine.

== Career ==
In 1997, Taylor was part of Namie Amuro's touring band for her "Summer Stage Concentration 20" tour.

Taylor played guitar on Al Daniels' Life In The Balance album that was released in 2001.

With Laura Hall she co-wrote the music for the 2002 romantic comedy short, Anatomy of a Breakup.

In 2003, she released her first solo album Pulse. It received a positive review from Guitar Noise with the reviewer saying that "she draws you in and dazzles you with its power".

In 2006, she and her band Threshold released the Sum Blues album. The bulk of the compositions were by Taylor. Besides Taylor on guitar, the musicians included Angela Carole Brown on vocals, Ed Roth on keyboards, Del Atkins on bass, Mikal Majeed on organ, and Laval Belle on drums. The backing vocals were provided by Catte Adams and Janelle Sadler. It was reviewed by Soul Tracks with the reviewer noting that the album touched on a number of social issues. The reviewer also called it a quality album and said that it would appeal to adult audiences.

She played on Art Garfunkel's 2012 album, The Singer. She contributed both acoustic and electric guitar to the recordings.

On May 2, 2013, she performed with Maia Sharp at An Beal Bocht. Their repertoire included "See Cecilia", "Something Wild" and "Red Dress". She worked on Sharp's album, The Dash Between the Dates which was released in 2015. She played guitar, bass guitar, keyboards and handled the programming.

Taylor played a big part on Sara Niemietz's Superman album that was released in October 2022. Niemietz had seen her play in LA and was impressed with Taylor's ability to play with an artist and not over power. Between then and the album's release, they were both asked to play with Jason Robert Brown at his Los Angeles show. They saw each other at the sound check and Niemietz was reminded of how good Taylor was. Not long after that everything went into lockdown because of Covid. After connecting online and writing a few tunes together they decided to make an album.

Taylor played guitar on track three of Bella Brown & The Jealous Lovers' Soul Clap album that was released in 2024.
