= Gina Ochsner =

American author (born 1970)

Gina Ochsner (born 1970) is an American author best known for her story collection The Necessary Grace to Fall, which won the Flannery O'Connor Award in 2001, and her novel The Russian Dream Book of Colour and Flight (2009).

Ochsner is a native of Oregon. She graduated from George Fox University, in Newberg, Oregon, and holds a master's degree from Iowa State University.

Her first published story was "Feldspar's Rock Shop" in the Dog River Review, Volume 13, No. 1 (1994), under the pseudonym, G. Withnell.

In 2018, Ochsner made an appearance on Storytellers Telling Stories, reading her story, "Elegy in Water". Her story "Soon the Light" was included in The Best American Short Stories 2022.
