= Laura Hall (musician) =

American musician from Chicago

- Origin: Chicago, Illinois, U.S.
- Occupation: Musician
- Instruments: Vocals; piano; keyboards; guitar
- Website: laurahall.com

Laura Hall is an American musician from Chicago. She is best known for her role as the band leader and pianist on the American version of the improvisational comedy television show Whose Line Is It Anyway?.

== Career ==
Hall began her musical career in her hometown of Chicago, Illinois, working as a pianist for various theater and improvisational companies including The Second City and the Improv Institute.

=== Whose Line Is It Anyway? ===
Many of the sketches on Whose Line Is It Anyway? include music, and there have been a number of musicians during the show's run. Colin Sell provided the music for the original BBC Radio series, and Richard Vranch took over the job when the show was brought to television in the United Kingdom. Hall made her first appearance on the show when it moved to the United States for its final series, and she appeared on six of the UK series' episodes.

Hall continued as the sole musician in the first season of the American version of the show. From the second season onward, Hall was often joined by multi-instrumentalist Linda Taylor, and other musicians were added occasionally. Additional performers included Anna Wanselius, Cece Worrall-Ruben, Anne King, and Candy Girard. Hall has performed throughout the twenty seasons of the American series.

Hall participated in similar projects with Drew Carey, such as Drew Carey's Green Screen Show and Drew Carey and the Improv Allstars. She also appeared in two episodes of Carey's sitcom, The Drew Carey Show.

=== Other pursuits ===
Hall has recorded a number of children's records as well as Christian rock worship music. Her band is called The Sweet Potatoes.

Hall performs at churches and conferences in the United States. She has led the music at Craig Springs Christian Camp's "Gap Camp". Designed for 18- to 24-year-olds, the camp is sponsored by the Christian Church (Disciples of Christ) and is held each spring in Virginia.

In 2018, Hall appeared on an episode of Storytellers Telling Stories, playing the accordion and singing alongside her husband, Rick Hall.

== Personal life ==
Laura Hall is married to Rick Hall, who is a former Second City mainstage actor. Laura and Rick Hall continued performing together.

Laura and Rick have two children.

== Albums ==
- The Sweet Potatoes as The Sweet Potatoes (2010) [Sister Trudy's Music 884501359955]
- All in God’s Good Time (2008) [Sister Trudy's Music 884501012195] - features guitar work by Linda Taylor
- A Woman of Faith (2006) [Sister Trudy's Music 837101273275]
- I See A Tiger / Come Join the Parade (1999, 2001) [Sister Trudy's Music 659057068121]

== Other contributions ==
- Composer, "Slice of Pie" (comedy short)
- Composer, Swimming in Auschwitz (2007)
- Co-composer, Look At Me (with Luke Hannington)
- Co-composer, Anatomy of a Breakup (with Linda Taylor)
- Composer, Tell Me A Story series of CDs [Friedman & Danziger]
- Composer, The Wheels on the Bus children’s videos series starring Roger Daltrey
- Christmas Caroler appearing in the movie, "Christmas With the Kranks".
