= Thirst Aid Kit =

Pop culture podcast

- Genre: Feminist, talk
- Format: Podcast
- Language: English

Creative team
- Created by: Bim Adewunmi; Nichole Perkins

Cast and voices
- Hosted by: Bim Adewunmi; Nichole Perkins

Music
- Theme music composed by: Tanya Morgan

Production
- Production: BuzzFeed (2017–2019); Slate (2019–2020)
- Length: 45–90 minutes

Publication
- No. of seasons: 6
- No. of episodes: 60+
- Original release: November 1, 2017 – September 17, 2020
- Provider: Slate

Related
- Related shows: Another Round
- Website: thirstaidkitpodcast.tumblr.com

Thirst Aid Kit was a podcast about celebrity lust and sexual desire hosted by journalist Bim Adewunmi and writer Nichole Perkins. It premiered on November 1, 2017, and the finale episode aired on September 17, 2020. It was officially produced by BuzzFeed until January 2019 and was picked up by Slate in September 2019.

Thirst Aid Kit was named on "best podcast" lists by Time and Entertainment Weekly.

== History ==
=== Development ===
Adewunmi and Perkins worked together at BuzzFeed and mutually enjoyed discussing pop culture and their celebrity sexual interests. This encouraged them to pitch the idea of a podcast about celebrity crushes to BuzzFeed executives.

The purpose of Thirst Aid Kit (TAK) was to openly discuss celebrities the hosts found attractive and to do so in an unabashed manner. According to Perkins, "It's really important to give women a space to show what we are interested in and what women want." They also used TAK to highlight people whose work may be well known, but whose faces are less familiar, such as director Ryan Coogler. The name Thirst Aid Kit refers to the slang meaning of the word thirst, which refers to sexual desire. Adewunmi and Perkins referred to their fan base as "thirst buckets."

=== Production ===
The first episode premiered on November 1, 2017, as a production of BuzzFeed. The show was produced by Keisha "TK" Dutes.

On January 25, 2019, it was announced that BuzzFeed would no longer produce the podcast and that the hosts were seeking a new sponsor. One day prior, BuzzFeed announced layoffs of 15% of their staff across the company.

In August 2019, it was announced that Slate had picked up the podcast. It relaunched through the company on September 26. Adewunmi and Perkins chose to partner with Slate because they "came to [the pair] knowledgeable about the podcast."

On September 17, 2020, the Thirst Aid Kit Twitter account stated that the weekly podcast had ended and the episode released that day was the finale. The hosts noted that they had decided to end the podcast mutually. In another tweet the account stated that live events and movie nights could take place in the future.

=== BFI series dispute ===
In February 2020, the British Film Institute (BFI) announced a forthcoming series called Thirst: Female Desire on Screen that had similar artwork to the TAK logo and a similar description. Journalist Musa Okwonga and Twitter users accused BFI of stealing the concept.

== Format ==
Each episode typically focuses on a single celebrity who the hosts find sexually attractive. The podcast begins and ends with either host reading an original short passage of fan fiction, which they call a drabble. The short reading features the focal "thirst object" in an intimate, and sometimes sexual, situation with the writer. Next, they explain what makes the actor desirable. Finally, they dissect the actor's persona in the context of Hollywood and society at large.

== Guests ==
Thirst Aid Kit sometimes featured an interview with the subject of the episode, such as Charlie Cox and Rahul Kohli. On January 28, 2018, the hosts had a phone interview with Chris Evans, who was on the set of Avengers: Infinity War. Evans made comments about not perceiving himself as "hot," which were picked up by media outlets such as E!, W, and InStyle.

== Other media ==
TAK also hosted live events such as "Thirsty Movie Nights." They hosted a live interview with Daniel Dae Kim at the 2020 Sundance Film Festival.

== Reception ==
The podcast received positive reception. In an article on feminist podcast recommendations, Evette Dionne of Bitch said of the show, "Whether it's reading delicious fan fiction, a staple at the beginning of most episodes, or offering thirst recommendations, Thirst Aid Kit is incredibly entertaining." Becca James of Vulture wrote that the show "is as much about the laughs as it is about the lust. Numerous times throughout the podcast, the hosts banter wittily, but it's the concluding fanfic wars that lend themselves to uproarious laughter." In a similarly positive review, Marnie Shure of The A.V. Club wrote, "Giggle-inducing and surprisingly moving, Thirst Aid Kit has been an essential addition to the BuzzFeed network of podcasts." Sydney Scott of Essence noted that the hosts' "warmth and banter" is a positive feature of the show. Byshera Williams wrote in a positive review for Bust, "By addressing the work that each man has created, discussing representation in film, asking why there are not more black women in romantic comedies, and writing fanfic, they weaponize their thirst for good."

The show was also recommended by Mashable and Vanity Fair.

== Accolades ==
- Best Fan Community, The A.V. Club (2018)
- Best Podcasts of 2018, Entertainment Weekly
- The 50 Best Podcasts to Listen to Right Now, Time (2018)
