= Soraya Nadia McDonald =

American writer and culture critic

- Occupation: Journalist; critic
- Education: Howard University (BA)
- Subjects: Culture; race; gender; sexuality
- Notable awards: George Jean Nathan Award for Dramatic Criticism (2020)

Soraya Nadia McDonald is an American writer and culture critic. She was previously a reporter at The Washington Post, and has been the culture critic for The Undefeated since 2016. McDonald was a finalist for the 2020 Pulitzer Prize for Criticism.

== Life and career ==
McDonald was raised in North Carolina. Her father is African American and her mother is a Sephardic Jew, born in Suriname and raised in Amsterdam, the Netherlands. McDonald received her Bachelor of Arts degree from Howard University, during which she interned for the high school sports desk at The Washington Post. She returned to the Post after graduation as a staff reporter and left in January 2016 to work as the senior culture writer for The Undefeated.

McDonald's writing covers pop culture, sports, race, gender, and sexuality. She frequently focuses her criticism on the intersection of art and race and has written on topics such as the weaknesses of a post-racial Gilead in The Handmaid's Tale, and the racial anxiety of BlackAF. McDonald often critiques the nature of American theater's engagement with the topic of race and has written about shows such as Choir Boy, White Noise, and Slave Play. On May 4, 2020, she was named a finalist for the 2020 Pulitzer Prize for Criticism. McDonald appeared on the podcast Storybound in 2021 to read one of the essays that earned her nomination, Wandering In Search of Wakanda, with music sampled from Marco Pavé.

McDonald is also a commentator on current events such as the implications of racial disparities in COVID-19 cases. Her work has appeared in and been cited in books and journalistic outlets such as NPR, Vox, and Elle.

In 2020, she contributed a chapter to the volume Believe Me edited by Jessica Valenti and Jaclyn Friedman.

== Awards and honors ==
- 2020 - George Jean Nathan Award for Dramatic Criticism, Winner
- 2020 - Vernon Jarrett Medal, Runner up, Morgan State University
- 2020 - Pulitzer Prize for Criticism, Finalist
