= Tammy Stoner =

American writer (born 1968)

Tammy Lynne Stoner
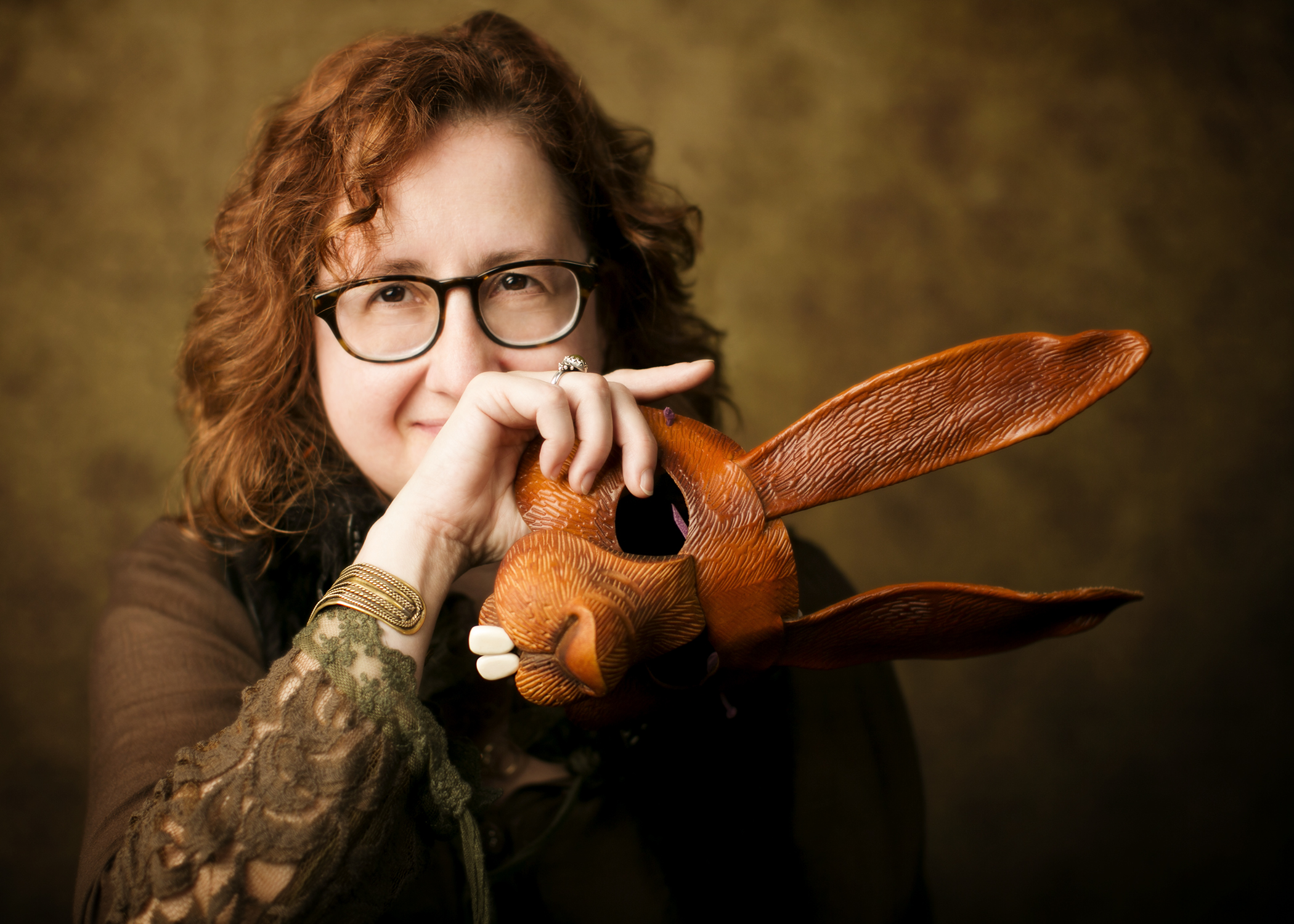
- Stoner in 2016
- Born: October 26, 1968 (age 57); Midland, Texas, U.S.
- Education: Temple University (BA); Antioch University (MFA)
- Occupations: Writer; artist
- Website: tammylynnestoner.com

Tammy Lynne Stoner (born October 26, 1968) is an American writer and artist. She was the Publisher of Gertrude, a 25-year-old, queer literary journal, and the author of Sugar Land.

== Personal life ==
Stoner was born in Midland, Texas, before her family settled in Mechanicsburg, Pennsylvania. After attending twelve years of Catholic school, she left for college.

In 1995, Stoner moved to South Korea. She taught English in Busan for a year before resettling in the Tenderloin in San Francisco in 1996. The following year she moved to Los Angeles where she lived for ten years, working at The Advocate, Out, HIV+, and Alyson Books.

In 2007, Stoner earned her M.F.A from Antioch University. She moved to Portland in 2008 and, after a few years in Switzerland, now lives with her children in Lake Oswego, Oregon.

== Creative work ==
In 2006, Stoner's son asked her why no families on kids' TV had two mommies, inspiring Stoner to write Dottie's Magic Pockets. Dottie was directed by her friend from Sony Pictures, Andrea Maxwell, and stars Jennifer Plante. It was released in 2007 to much media buzz and played at numerous queer film festivals including London, Melbourne, Toronto, Outfest, and Frameline. Now, Dottie is in 100+ libraries in the United States and Canada.

From 2011-2014, Stoner was the fiction editor for Gertrude Journal, a queer literary and arts journal based in Portland, Oregon, and took over as publisher in 2017.

Stoner also wrote several short films, including being on staff for Second Shot, starring Jill Bennett, who she had also collaborated with in the LA drag king troupe, the Sugar Daddy show (2000–2003), with Stoner as Frankie Roundfirmenhigh.

Stoner's shorter literary writing has appeared in dozens of journals and anthologies. She's been nominated for a Million Writers Award and two Pushcarts. Stoner was an Artist-in-Resident with Sou'Wester and a writing fellow with the VCCA. In 2018, her first novel, Sugar Land, was released by Red Hen Press and went on to win an IPPY Award and be a finalist in the Forewords Book of the Year Award 2018., and short-listed for others, including the Crooks Corner Book Prize.

Sugar Land has been called a "ravishing debut" in a starred Kirkus Review, "writing at its finest" by the New York Journal of Books, and "surprising and exhilarating" by Booklist. Bookpage wrote, "a novel of exploration, bravery and redemption, with keen insight into race, class, gender identity and social norms, Sugar Land is the story of a woman learning to come home to herself."

In 2019, Stoner appeared on an episode of Storytellers Telling Stories, reading an excerpt from Sugar Land, accompanied by Americana duo Pretty Gritty.

She is developing "Sugar Land" into a TV series, alongside other film projects. It has done very well in contests. The proof-of-concept short film "Nana Dara is Gay" launched at the 2023 American Pavilion at the Cannes Film Festival and won OUTshine Audience Favorite Award in Fort Lauderdale, among others.

Her pilot for the TV series "Dipso Maniac" Won Best Pilot won the Portland Screenwriting Awards 2023. and her feature, "The Life & Assumed Death of the Baroness", now supported by Film Independent and in pre-production, was a 2024 Nicholls Fellowship Semi-Finalist.

== See also ==
- List of LGBT people from Portland, Oregon
