= Daniel Sherrell =

- Born: December 26, 1990 (age 35)
- Education: Brown University
- Writing career
- Notable work: Warmth: Coming of Age at the End of Our World

Daniel Sherrell is an American author and political organizer involved in the climate movement. He is the author of Warmth: Coming of Age at the End of Our World, a memoir on the climate crisis framed as a letter to Sherrell's potential future child.

== Early life and education ==
Daniel Sherrell was born in 1990. His father is an oceanographer and his mother studies metabolism; both work at Rutgers University. Sherell grew up in New Jersey and attended Brown University, graduating in 2013 with a Bachelor of Arts in environmental studies. At Brown, Sherrell led the Brown Divest Coal Campaign, which advocated for the university's divestment from the coal industry. He also worked with individuals incarcerated by the Rhode Island Department of Corrections as part of an outreach program.

== Work ==
In 2021, Sherrell published his first book, Warmth: Coming of Age at the End of Our World. The book enjoyed positive critical reception and was included in The New Yorker's list of "Best Books We Read in 2021." Sherrell has written on climate issues for The Guardian and Grist.

In 2022, Sherrell appeared on Storybound (podcast) for a special adaptation of an excerpt from his book Warmth.

== Bibliography ==
- Sherrell, Daniel (3 August 2021). Warmth: coming of age at the end of our world. New York, USA: Penguin Books. ISBN 978-0-14-313653-8. Paperback version.
- Sherrell, D. (November 2026). 'Living with the crisis: My work in the climate movement', in Teusch, R. and Kostner, D. (eds.) The Climate Crisis and Beyond in the Consulting Room. London: Karnac Books. ISBN 9781800134829
