= The History Chicks =

Women's history podcast

- Genre: History podcast
- Language: English

Cast and voices
- Hosted by: Beckett Graham and Susan Vollenweider

Production
- Length: Approx. 60 minutes

Publication
- Original release: January 20, 2011
- Provider: QCode

The History Chicks is a history podcast about women in history. The show is hosted by Beckett Graham and Susan Vollenweider, and has been releasing episodes since 2011. In each episode, the hosts examine the life of a historic woman from birth to death as well as her legacy. The hosts also review any source materials that they used in researching the subject. They provide ways for listeners to learn more in their shownotes. Graham and Vollenweider are the writers, hosts, and producers of the podcast.

== Background ==
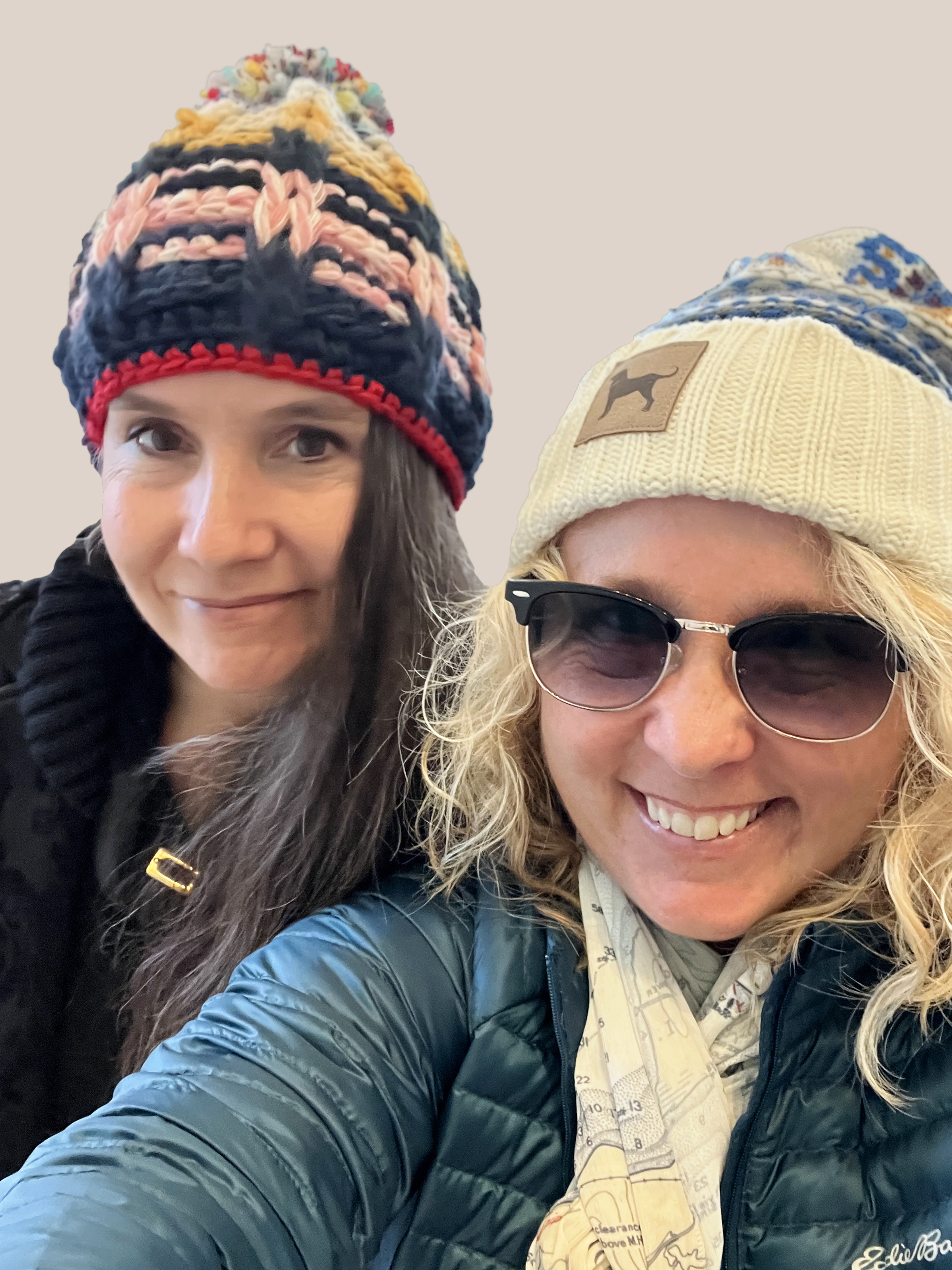
Beckett Graham (left) and Susan Vollenweider (right), co-hosts

The podcast began when Graham, not finding any podcasts solely covering women's history, decided to create the show she wanted to listen to. She found Vollenweider on an online moms' message board.

Vollenweider, is a freelance writer and columnist for The Kansas City Star.

The History Chicks podcast launched on January 20, 2011, and their first episode, on Queen Marie Antoinette dropped on January 31 of the same year. The show hit iTunes New and Notable section.

While an independent production, the podcast joined the Panoply Media in 2016, and moved to Wondery in 2019. They are now on the QCode podcast network.

Episodes are released on a twice a month basis. Episodes cover both historical figures as well as fictional ones. Each episode is about an hour long. The show is a feminist podcast.

In 2016, the hosts discussed three women who ran for president: Victoria Woodhull, Belva Lockwood, and Shirley Chisholm.

They also have another podcast called the Recappery where they talk about history-themed media.

== Format ==
Each episode begins with a 30-second Summary where the hosts encapsulate the history of the subject in a very quick paragraph. It is followed by Dropped in History where a list of other events happening during the life of the subject from inventions, to wars, and other things people may have heard of. What follows is a set format with information about the subjects family, location, details of how her parents met, her siblings lives, and finally, the rest of the episode focuses on the subjects life, education, challenges, family, failures, and accomplishments.

Graham and Vollenweider don't discuss their research with each other until recording, they want the conversation to flow organically and spotlight different aspects of the subjects like that may only be of interest to one of them. "It's exciting for us to see the same woman through the eyes of each other—things that one of us finds interesting, the other might gloss over."

The Media section is where the two discuss the sources that they used in research, any that they would recommend, finally movies, other media, and museums related to the subject.

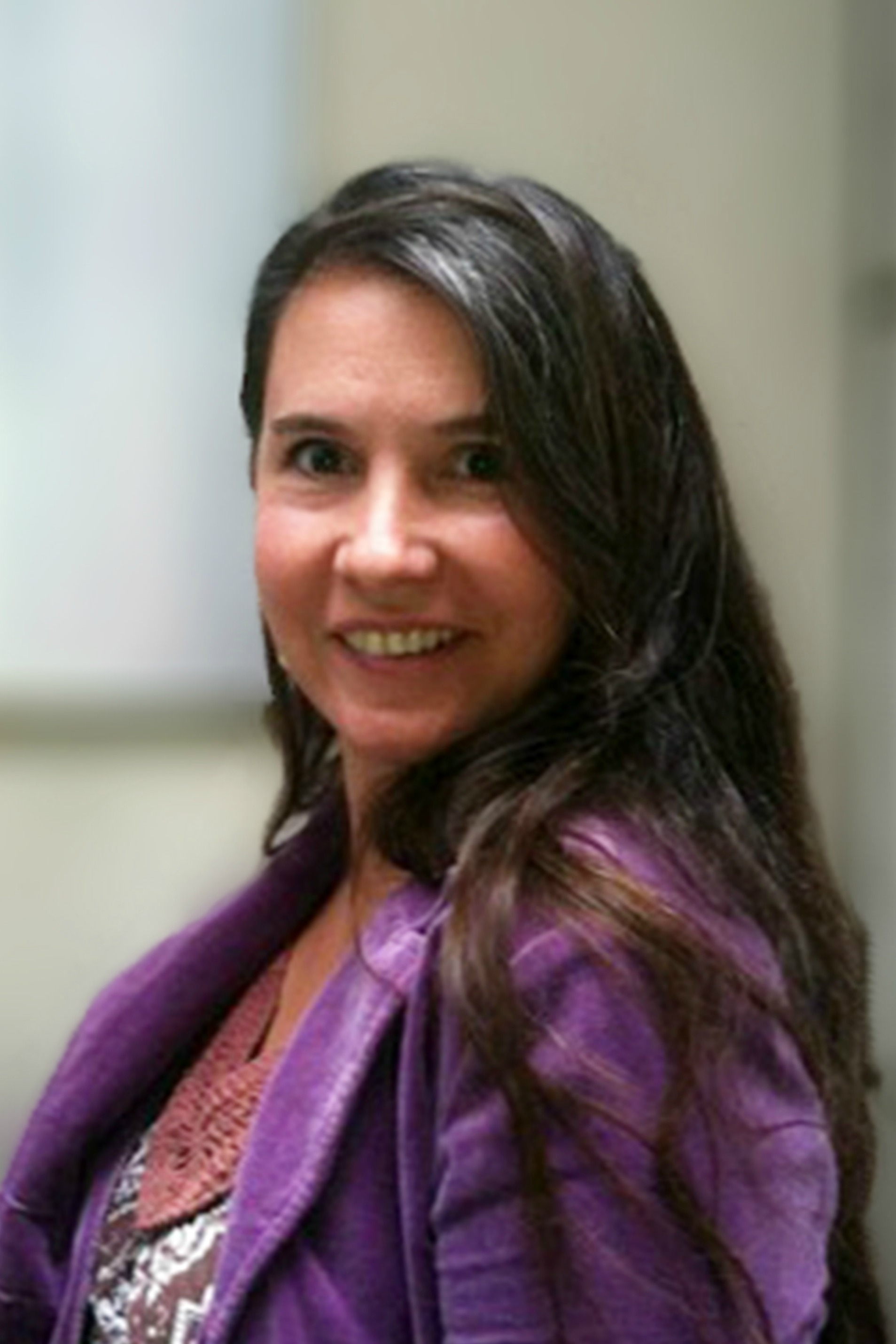
Beckett Graham, co-host

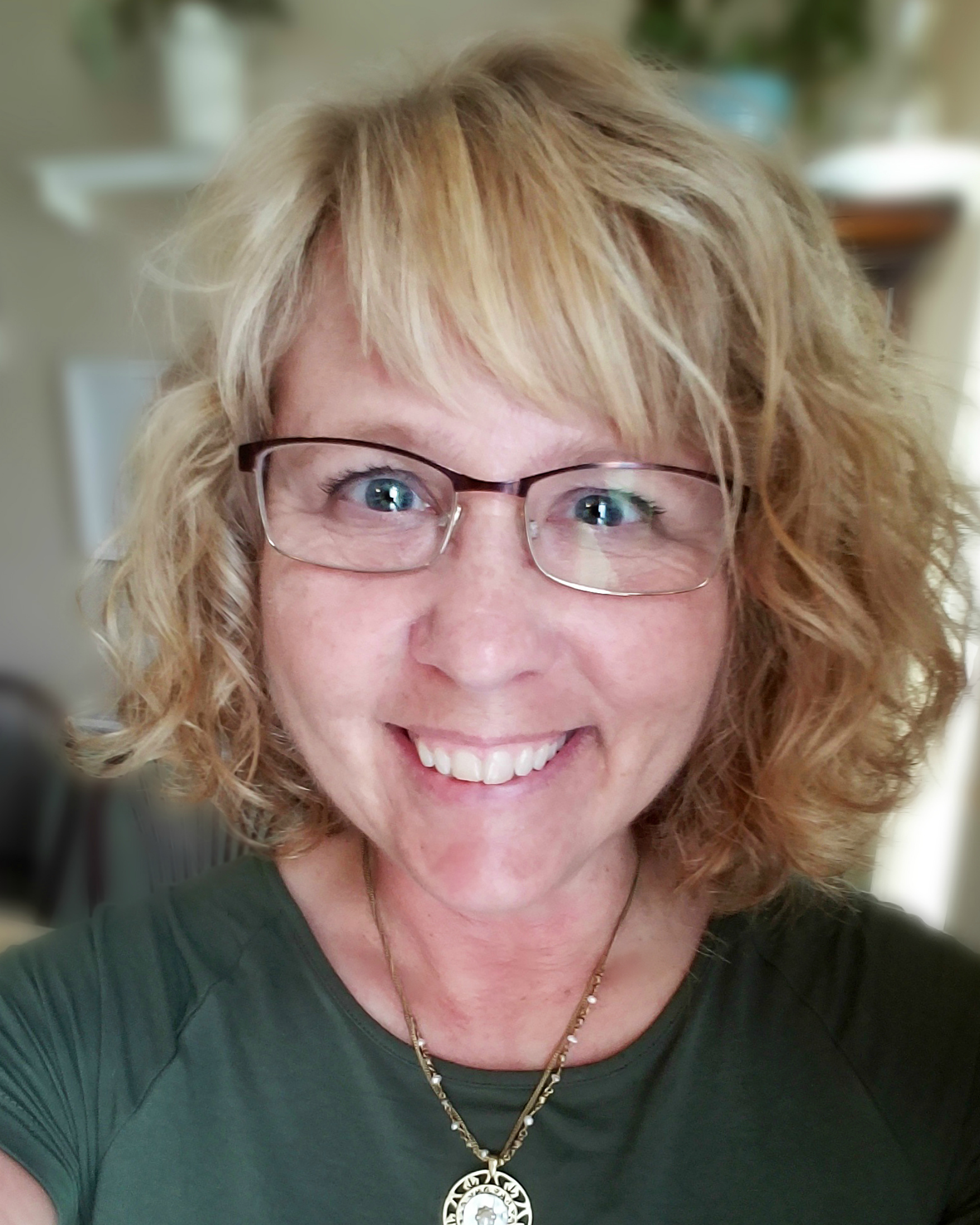
Susan Vollenweider, co-host

== Reception ==
In 2021, Graham and Vollenweider appeared on C-SPAN's Q&A series and the Washington Journal.

The History Chicks have also contributed to several History Channel series such as The Machines that Built America (2021) and The Engineering that Built the World (2021). In November 2025 PBS began airing a new Ken Burns’ documentary The American Revolution (TV series). Betsy Ambler is one of the “voices” in the six-part series, and Susan and Beckett sat down with one of the co-directors of the series, Sarah Botstein, to talk about her experience sharing Betsy’s story in episode 274 of the podcast.

The podcast has been recommended on many top history podcast lists including Lifewire.com, Speechify.com, Feedspot.com, Bustle.com, Whatpods.com and Vogue.com

=== Awards ===
Award	Date	Category	Result	Ref.
Podcast Awards	2011	Education	Finalist	
Podcast Awards	2012	Education	Finalist	
Podcast Awards	2013	Education	Finalist	
Podcast Awards	2014	Education	Finalist	
Podcast Awards	2015	Education	Finalist	
Podcast Awards	2016	Education	Finalist	
Podcast Awards	2017	Education	Finalist	
Mixcloud Online Radio Awards	2018	Education	Won	
Academy of Podcasters	2016	History	Finalist	
Discover Pods Awards	2021	History	Won	
Discover Pods Awards	2019	History	Won	

== External ==
https://thehistorychicks.com/ Official website
