= Tamara Winfrey-Harris =

American author

- Born: Gary, Indiana, U.S.
- Education: Iowa State University, Greenlee School of Journalism
- Notable work: The Sisters Are Alright: Changing the Broken Narrative of Black Women in America
- Website: www.tamarawinfreyharris.com

Tamara Winfrey-Harris is an American author, columnist and speaker. Her writing topics include politics, pop culture, race, and gender.

== Early life and education ==
Winfrey-Harris is from Gary, Indiana. She received a BA from the Greenlee School of Journalism at Iowa State University.

== Career ==
Winfrey-Harris' first book, The Sisters Are Alright: Changing the Broken Narrative of Black Women in America was published in May 2015. The book won the Phyllis Wheatley Award, the IndieFab Award, and Independent Publishers' Living Now Award and IPPY Award. Her next book, Dear Black Girl: Letters From Your Sisters on Stepping Into Your Power, is planned to be released in March 2021.

Winfrey-Harris has spoken on NPR's Weekend Edition and Janet Mock's So Popular on MSNBC. In 2018, she delivered the keynote address at the Arts Council of Indianapolis' Let's Eat Conference about the business of art.

She is the Vice President of Community Leadership & Effective Philanthropy at the Central Indiana Community Foundation (CICF).

In 2021, Winfrey-Harris appeared on Storybound (podcast), accompanied by an original Storybound remix with Au Revoir Simone.

== Works ==
=== Books ===
- The Sisters Are Alright: Changing the Broken Narrative of Black Women in America. Berrett-Koehler Publishers. ISBN 9781626563513. May 22, 2015.
- Dear Black Girl: Letters From Your Sisters on Stepping Into Your Power. Berrett-Koehler Publishers. To be published in March 2021.

=== Bitch columns ===
Winfrey-Harris has written a series of columns in Bitch, especially including a series called Some of us are Brave.

=== Other publications ===
- "Singled Out". Ms. April 18, 2012.
- "A Twerk Too Far". The American Prospect. September 5, 2013.
- "Black Like Who? Rachel Dolezal's Harmful Masquerade". The New York Times. June 16, 2015.
- "A Woman's Worth: Bill Cosby and Beyond". Ebony. October 20, 2015.
- "What We Get Wrong About Black Women's Sexuality". Cosmopolitan. February 20, 2016.
- "The Ugliness of This Campaign Won't Go Away, No Matter What Happens Tomorrow". The Cut. November 7, 2016.
- "The Real Work of Being an Ally". The Cut. January 17, 2017.
- "Stop Pretending Black Midwesterners Don't Exist". The New York Times. June 16, 2018.
- "The Reckoning Will Be Incomplete Without Black Women and Girls". The Atlantic. June 14, 2020.
