= Shayla Lawson =

American poet

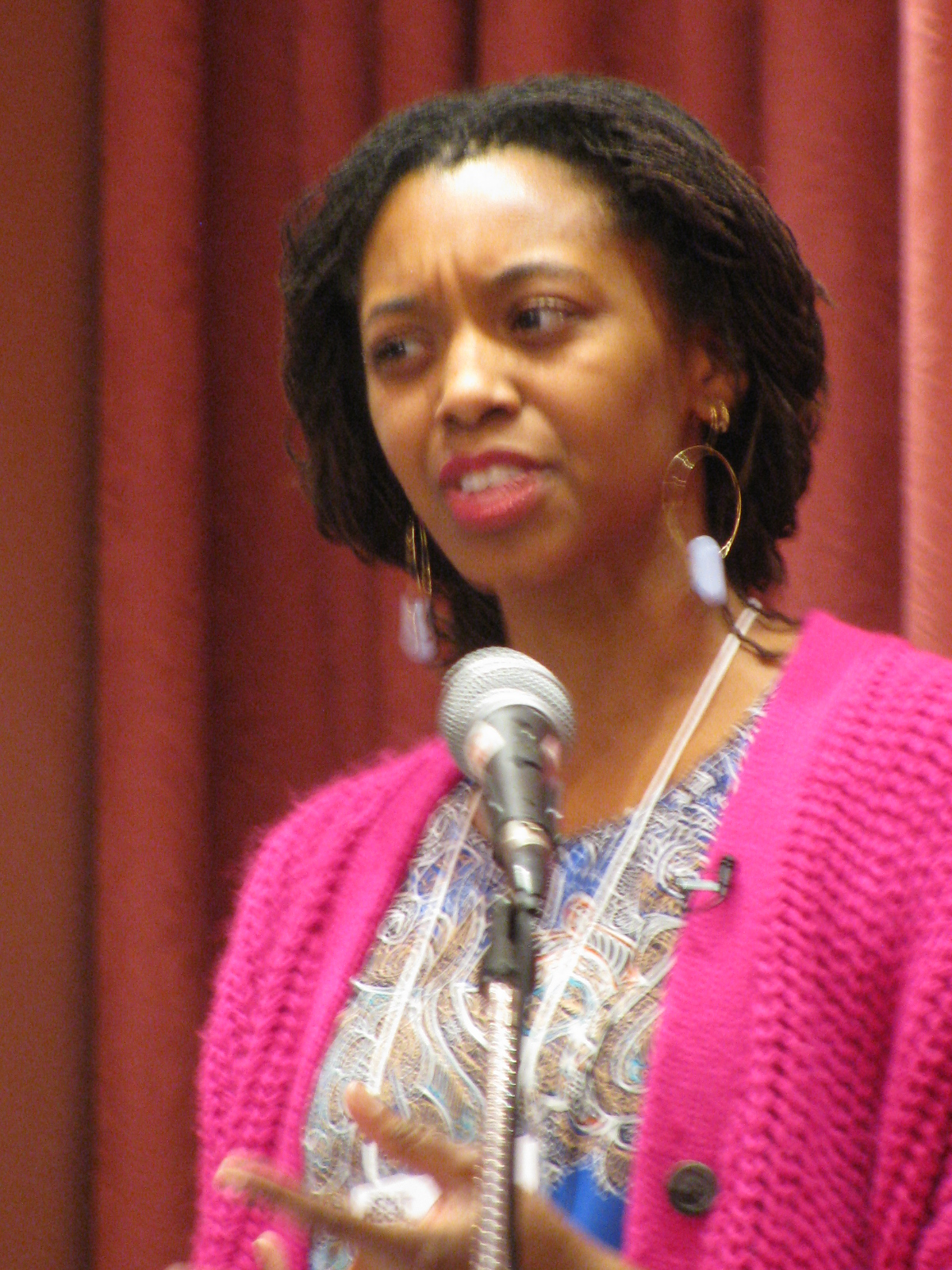
- Born: Kentucky, U.S.
- Occupations: Writer in Residence, Amherst College
- Writing career
- Genres: Poetry, Essay
- Notable work: I Think I'm Ready to See Frank Ocean
- Notable awards: Honorable Mention, 2017 Cave Canem Poetry Prize

Shayla Lawson is an American poet and writer, currently the writer in residence at Amherst College.

== Biography ==
Lawson grew up in Kentucky and entered the slam poetry scene there before majoring in Architecture at the University of Kentucky, where they (Note: Lawson uses they/them pronouns.) gave the 2005 Breathitt Lecture, "My Ancestor Antenna: Hair and Its Relation to African-American Identity Across the Diaspora." After graduating, Lawson worked as an architect for some time before pursuing their MFA at Indiana University Bloomington, where they worked as the nonfiction editor of the Indiana Review and for the Graduate Mentoring Center. Lawson published their debut collection, A Speed Education in Human Being, in 2013, the chapbook Pantone, of which each poem was printed on its own card, in 2016, and the book I Think I'm Ready to See Frank Ocean in 2018. They received the 2017 Oregon Literary Fellowship and Honorable Mention in the 2017 Cave Canem Poetry Prize. Lawson succeeded Daniel Hall as the poet in residence at Amherst College beginning in the 2018–19 academic year.

In 2021, Shayla Lawson appeared on Storybound (podcast) reading two excerpts from their book This Is Major, with music by MAITA.

== Awards and honors ==
- 2020 National Book Critics Circle Award (autobiography), finalist for This Is Major: Notes on Diana Ross, Dark Girls, and Being Dope

== Publications ==
- A Speed Education in Human Being, Sawyer House, 2013.
- Pantone, Miel, 2016.
- I Think I'm Ready to See Frank Ocean, Saturnalia Books, 2018.
- This is Major: Notes on Diana Ross, Dark Girls, and Being Dope, Harper Perennial, 2020.
- How to live free in a dangerous world: a decolonial memoir, Tiny Reparation Books, 2024
