= Erie Meyer =

American technologist and entrepreneur

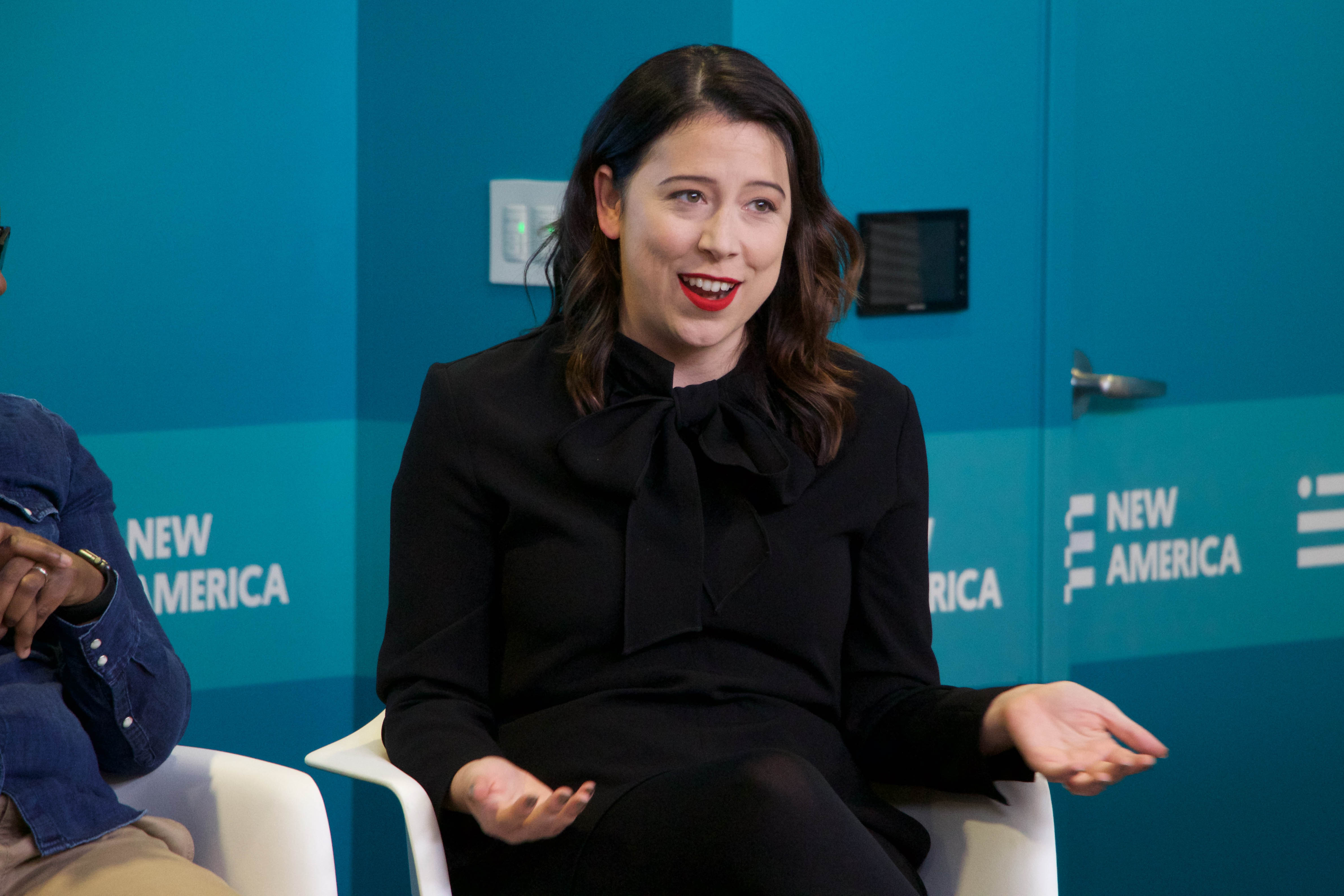

Chief technologist and senior advisor to the director, Consumer Financial Protection Bureau
- In office 2021–2025

Personal details
- Born: Ohio
- Education: American University
- Known for: Co-Founding Tech LadyMafia, Consumer Protection; Civic Technology

Erie Meyer is an American technologist and federal government executive. She was the first chief technologist of the Consumer Financial Protection Bureau (CFPB) under Director Rohit Chopra from 2021 to 2025, and was chief technologist of the Federal Trade Commission (FTC) under FTC Chair Lina Khan in 2021. Meyer had also been a technologist in the office of then-FTC Commissioner Rohit Chopra. Meyer is the co-founder of the networking list Tech Ladymafia with Aminatou Sow. In 2022, she was named a Tech Titan by Washingtonian magazine.

== Education and awards ==
Meyer graduated from American University’s journalism school in 2006, and began her career in digital service delivery and consumer protection. Meyer co-founded Tech LadyMafia with her close friend Aminatou Sow.

Meyer was named Forbes 30 Under 30 for technology and as part of Fedscoop's Top 50 Women in Tech. In 2018, Meyer was featured among "America's Top 50 Women In Tech" by Forbes.

In 2025, the Electronic Frontier Foundation (EFF) named Meyer the winner of the EFF Award for Protecting Americans' Data.

== Career and government service ==
After college, Meyer worked for digital strategy firm Blue State Digital and then transitioned to public service by working for then-Ohio Attorney General Richard Cordray. In that role, she stood up the first digital communications function.

=== Obama administration ===
When Richard Cordray became the first Director of the Consumer Financial Protection Bureau, Meyer joined his team in Washington and founded the Tech and Innovation team.

She then was senior advisor to the United States chief technology officer Todd Park at the White House, and co-founded of the United States Digital Service at the White House. In that role, Meyer worked on Open Data Initiatives, the Presidential Innovation Fellows program, and cross-agency programs to improve technology in government.

In 2017, Meyer was the senior director at Code for America, a non-profit organization.

=== FTC and Biden administration ===
In 2018, Meyer joined the Federal Trade Commission (FTC) in the office of then-Commissioner Rohit Chopra as a technology advisor. In that role, she worked on the Safeguards Rule technology oversight issues. In June 2021, Meyer was appointed as the chief technologist at the Federal Trade Commission.

Upon Rohit Chopra's appointment and confirmation as director of the Consumer Financial Protection Bureau (CFPB) in 2021, Meyer moved to be a chief technologist at the CFPB.
