= Ann Friedman =

Journalist, editor and podcaster

Ann L. Friedman
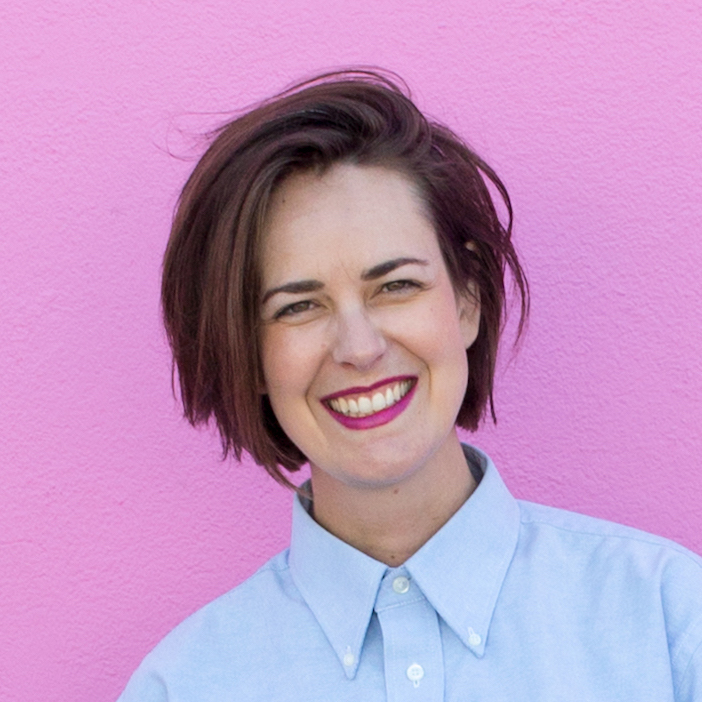
- Born: January 10, 1982 (age 44); Dubuque, Iowa, United States
- Education: University of Missouri, 2004
- Occupations: Editor, journalist, freelance writer, and podcaster
- Years active: since 2004
- Known for: Political and feminist commentary, Shine Theory
- Notable work: Call Your Girlfriend (podcast), Big Friendship (book)
- Awards: Hearst Award, 2004; Utne Media Award (nomination), 2013
- Website: annfriedman.com

Ann Friedman is an American magazine editor, journalist, podcaster, and pie chart artist. She writes about gender, politics, and social issues. She co-hosted the podcast Call Your Girlfriend, sends a weekly email newsletter called The Ann Friedman Weekly, and is a contributing editor for The Gentlewoman. Previously, she was deputy editor for The American Prospect, executive editor at the Los Angeles–based GOOD magazine, and a co-founder of the employee-driven, crowd-sourced spin-off Tomorrow magazine.

== Personal background ==
Ann Friedman's hometown is Dubuque, Iowa. She began her journalism career there as an intern with the Telegraph Herald in 2001. She is an alumna of the University of Missouri, where she graduated from its School of Journalism in 2004. Friedman lived in New York City for over a year. Friedman also lived in Washington, DC, where she met friend and co-podcast host Aminatou Sow. Los Angeles is her permanent residence. She identifies herself in public speaking engagements and in her work as a feminist.

== Career ==
In the fall of 2005, Friedman started off as a fact-checking fellow at Mother Jones' . Her online editing career began when she took the managing editor position for AlterNet and became an editor at Feministing, where she had already been writing since 2004. After taking a position with The American Prospect as web editor she was promoted to deputy editor from 2008 to 2010. She wrote freelance before her next editing position. In March 2011, Friedman became the executive editor at GOOD magazine. After GOOD fired most of its writers and editors, including Friedman, they co-founded Tomorrow (magazine) together. They started a Kickstarter, raising $20,000 in a day to fund the one-off print of the magazine.

Her freelance writings have been published by Rolling Stone, The New Republic, Newsweek, Glamour, ELLE, and Columbia Journalism Review. Her feminist writings and commentary about politics, popular culture, attitudes about men and women and gay rights, and dating and sex have been widely referenced and quoted by other journalists and editorial writers.

Friedman writes a politics column at NYMag.com, published pie-charts at The Hairpin, disperses RealTalk advice for journalists at the Columbia Journalism Review, and contributes to The New Republic. She is a proponent of incorporating GIFs in journalism.

Friedman was the founder of the Lady Journos’ Tumblr site, which curates the accomplishments and works by female journalists, speaks to issues of gender disparity in hiring and sexism in the workplace.

Friedman, and her colleague Aminatou Sow popularized the term "Shine Theory". The term is in reference to the commitment to collaborating with each other instead of competing against each other. The term first appeared in Friedman's article for The Cut for NYMag.com in 2013.

=== GOOD magazine ===
Friedman worked at The American Prospect until she quit in 2010 to pick up more freelance writing work. The Los Angeles–based GOOD magazine hired her as executive editor in March 2011. As the executive editor, Friedman focused on moving the GOOD brand over multiple platforms and bringing a youthful style to its content, but that vision conflicted with the management. She was subsequently fired along with most of the magazine's editors in June 2012. Friedman and her GOOD colleagues started a crowd-funded one-off magazine called Tomorrow. That project was backed via Kickstarter, and raised $30,000 more than expected.

=== Call Your Girlfriend ===
Friedman co-hosted the popular feminist podcast Call Your Girlfriend with her friend, tech entrepreneur Aminatou Sow. The podcast was described as a cultural phenomenon where the hosts discussed politics and pop culture, ranging from the very serious (police abolition or abortion rights) to reality TV (Kardashians). Started in June 2014, it gained popularity before the podcasting boom and eventually evolved into a show which goes beyond the initial catch-up phone calls, with themed episodes and guest interviews of primarily politicians, activists, and writers. The podcast ended in February 2022.

=== Big Friendship ===
Friedman and Aminatou Sow co-wrote Big Friendship: How We Keep Each Other Close which was released July 17, 2020. The book is a hybrid, combining memoir with cultural criticism and "an examination of friendship’s role in society." As the title suggests, they introduce a new concept of 'big friendship' to emphasize the importance of friendships in our lives and create a term to describe the close friendships which can be as much or more influential in our lives than romantic partnerships. Sow described the lack of vocabulary they both found to describe their close adult friendships in their 30s, including their own decade-long friendship,

"There is something about the words bestie or BFF or even best friend that imply that it’s an exclusive relationship that you have with one person. And it feels a little infantilizing to me. [...] This term big friendship was meant to define friendships that are complicated and nuanced, friendships that you have had for a long time and that you want to keep in your life for a long time."

One of the reasons for giving friendships a term to express their seriousness was to encourage readers "to stop seeing these relationships as something that can be put on hold while we focus on careers or marriages or children." Instead, they make the argument, friendship is actually one of life's most important foundations.

== Writing themes and style ==
Friedman is a journalist who generally writes non-fiction, exploring political themes, current events and pop culture. Often she writes reported pieces, though at times they include humorous or personal elements. When asked about writing more personal work, Friedman responded:

"It’s pretty rare that I write a personal essay that’s purely about my experience—if I think it’s worth writing about publicly, that’s typically because I think it says something about politics or culture. So I try to make the connection. Research and reporting is often still a part of the process, even if the piece is first and foremost a personal essay."

== Awards and recognition ==
Ann Friedman won the 2004 Hearst Award for personality/profile writing. Before that she had won the Telegraph Herald Scholastic Journalist Award.

Friedman was among Columbia Journalism Review's "20 women to watch" in its July 2012 issue. In 2013, Tomorrow magazine was nominated for an Utne Media Award.

== Bibliography ==
=== Books ===
- Friedman, Ann (2012). "All in Together". In Barham, Nick; Dockter, Jake (eds.). American Dreamers: Optimists, Mavericks, and Mad Inventors Share Their Dreams for Brighter Futures. Sharp Stuff. ISBN 9780988603912.
- Friedman, Ann (July 2013). "A New Pathway Toward Sourcing". In McBride, Kelly; Rosenstiel, Tom (eds.). The New Ethics of Journalism: Principles for the 21st Century. Sage Publishing.
- Friedman, Ann; Sow, Aminatou (July 14, 2020). Big Friendship: How We Keep Each Other Close. Simon & Schuster. ISBN 978-1982111908.

=== Essays and Reporting ===
- Friedman, Ann (September 29, 2015). "Me, Inc". The New Republic.
- — (October 23, 2017). "The Unexpected Power of Google-Doc Activism". New York.
- — (May 29, 2018). "How Will the Fall of Theranos's Elizabeth Holmes Affect Women Leaders?". Elle.
- — (2018). "Allison Janney". The Gentlewoman. 17.
- — (August 23, 2018). "Op-Ed: Social media isn't a social safety net". Los Angeles Times.
- — (26 April 2018). "Glennon Doyle is Coming to Get the White Women". New York Magazine.
- — (May 14, 2020). "Check on an Extrovert Today". The New York Times.
