= Sometimes I Trip on How Happy We Could Be =

2021 non-fiction book by Nichole Perkins

Sometimes I Trip on How Happy We Could Be: Essays
- First edition book cover
- Author: Nichole Perkins
- Cover artist: Adriana Bellet
- Language: English
- Subject: African American women, personal memoir
- Publisher: Grand Central Publishing
- Publication date: 2021-08-17 (1st edition)
- Publication place: United States
- Media type: Print (paperback)
- Pages: 272
- ISBN: 9781538702741
- OCLC: 1246677747
- Website: https://www.nicholeperkins.com/sometimes-i-trip-on-how-happy-we-could-be

Sometimes I Trip on How Happy We Could Be: Essays is a nonfiction essay collection and memoir by American writer Nichole Perkins. The book was released on August 17, 2021, by Grand Central Publishing. It was recommended by Fortune, Bitch, and Buzzfeed News.

== Synopsis ==
The book is a collection of essays about Nichole Perkins' life experiences, including childhood memories, that relate to her perspective as a Black woman and the influence of pop culture on her development. Essay topics include her family, religion, past experiences of depression, her crush on Niles Crane, and the ways that musical icon Prince's music stoked her earliest feelings of sexual desire. Perkins writes about her sexual experiences and past romantic relationships.

== Critical reception ==
The book received positive reception. Kirkus reviewed the book as "a thoroughly enjoyable journey into the mind of a beloved pop-culture commentator." Publishers Weekly wrote in a similarly positive review: "writing from a place of humility and humor, Perkins paints an exuberant portrait of a Black woman speaking to and from her power. Tender and bright, this intimate work piques nonstop." Sarah Schroeder described it in a starred review for Library Journal, "Memoir readers who appreciate unpredictability, candor, and pop culture will enjoy this book and may very well find themselves thinking about it even weeks after they’ve finished it." Vanessa Willoughby commended Perkins' writing style in Bitch: "Perkins’s strength lies in her first-person narrative voice, which undermines the literary world’s recent dismissal of personal essays as both an enduring genre and a cultural touchstone." Of the book's sexual content, Molly Sprayregen wrote in the Star Tribune, "Above all else, this is a book about desire, and more specifically, shamelessly owning that desire. Utilizing humor, raw honesty, and an intimate writing style with which readers can easily connect, Perkins has crafted a powerful memoir that is well worth the read."

Sometimes I Trip on How Happy We Could Be was recommended prior to its release by Bitch, Ms., Elle, Fortune, Goodreads, and BuzzFeed News, and was selected for Roxane Gay's book club. Perkins adapted a chapter of the book into a segment of the radio show This American Life, which was first broadcast on September 3, 2021.

== Publication ==
- Perkins, Nichole (2021). Sometimes I Trip on How Happy We Could Be. United States: Grand Central Publishing. ISBN 978-1-5387-0274-1.
