= Bim Adewunmi =

British writer and journalist

- Born: London, England, United Kingdom
- Occupations: Writer, producer, journalist
- Writing career
- Language: English
- Years active: 2014―present
- Notable work: Thirst Aid Kit

Bim Adewunmi is a British writer and journalist. She is a producer for This American Life and previously worked as a culture writer at BuzzFeed and The Guardian. She co-hosted the podcast Thirst Aid Kit with writer Nichole Perkins (2017-2020). Her debut play, Hoard, premiered at Arcola Theatre in May 2019.

== Career ==
In 2014, Adewunmi began writing an opinion and culture column in the Lifestyle section of The Guardian. She became a culture editor for BuzzFeed in 2015. She left The Guardian in October 2018 and joined the American public radio program This American Life as a producer in April 2019.

=== Thirst Aid Kit ===
In November 2017, Adewunmi co-developed and began co-hosting Thirst Aid Kit, a podcast about celebrity lust, with writer Nichole Perkins. BuzzFeed ended its relationship with the podcast in January 2019. The podcast was picked up by Slate in August 2019, and it returned on September 26, 2019, until the hosts decided to formally end the podcast on September 17, 2020.

=== Hoard ===
Adewunmi's debut play, Hoard, premiered at the Arcola Theatre in May 2019. The play centers on a Nigerian-British family, the Bakares, who reside in East London. A comedy about the relationship between an eccentric mother, who is a hoarder, and her daughters, it received mixed critical reviews.

Peter Mason, giving the play four stars out of five in the Morning Star newspaper, described it as "a very good debut", and wrote: "Essentially, Hoard explores whether a mother can ever live her own life beyond the orbit of her children and vice versa. Its conclusions are surprisingly heartwarming and it provides an uplifting insight into how we should all perhaps let go of our controlling instincts in favour of a philosophy of live and let live."

However, Arifa Akbar, in a three-star review for The Guardian, declared that "...the hoarding theme ends up feeling confected and simply not dramatic enough to warrant the emotional ruptures it creates".

Writing for Time Out London, Rosemary Waugh also rated the play three out of five stars, and stated: "Adewunmi describes her play as ‘a love letter to east London’, and it shows. It's also a love letter to the characters who are all so warm and lovingly sketched it would be hard to genuinely begrudge spending time in their company."

== Personal life ==
Adewunmi was born and raised in Stratford, East London to Nigerian immigrant parents who are of Yoruba descent. As of May 2016, she resides in Brooklyn, New York. She is mother to a child born in 2023.
