= Monica Drake =

American fiction writer

- Born: Eugene, Oregon, U.S.
- Education: University of Arizona (MFA)
- Occupation: Writer
- Children: 1
- Writing career
- Genre: Fiction
- Website: www.monicadrake.com

Monica Drake is an American fiction writer known for her novels, Clown Girl and The Stud Book and her collection of linked stories, The Folly of Loving Life.

Her essays and short work have appeared in The Paris Review, New York Times' "Modern Love" column, The Rumpus, Longreads, Oregon Humanities Magazine and other publications. She is also the author of a significant essay, published anonymously on Longreads, which went viral and inspired energized cultural conversations about divorce court, marriage and life as a woman author.

Clown Girl was a finalist for the 2007 Ken Kesey Award for the Novel through the Oregon Book Awards. It was named Best Book of 2007 by Fight Club author Chuck Palahniuk in the December 2007 issue of Playboy Magazine.

Actress and comedian Kristen Wiig optioned the film rights for Clown Girl.

The Stud Book gained attention for its "dead girl shots game" and the author's commentary "about the way the dead bodies of women have become such a popular television trope." The Oregonian characterized the novel as "mesmerizing".

Drake lives in Portland, Oregon.

In the early 1990's she was author Tom Spanbauer's first student in his now renowned "kitchen table" writing workshops, aka Dangerous Writers. She credits Spanbauer with inspiring her to begin her writing practice.

For approximately eighteen years she was a faculty member at the Pacific Northwest College of Art (PNCA) where she developed and launched the writing major and ran two separate speaker series, up until that college merged with another institution, becoming PNCA Willamette.

She is a graduate of the University of Arizona's MFA program in creative writing. There, she was a John Weston award winner, and began her teaching career alongside writing. Notably, she studied with author Joy Williams, as well as Dagoberto Gilb and Elizabeth Evans.

In 2018, Drake appeared on Storytellers Telling Stories, reading from her newest book, The Folly of Loving Life, accompanied by singer-songwriter, Katelyn Convery.
