= Aminatou Sow =

American podcaster and writer

- Born: April 8, 1985 (age 41); Guinea
- Education: University of Texas at Austin
- Occupations: Podcast host Digital strategist Writer
- Years active: 2011–present
- Known for: Call Your Girlfriend (podcast)

Aminatou Sow (IPA: /əmiːˈnɑːtuː soʊ/; born April 1985) is a United States-based businesswoman, digital strategist, writer, podcast host, interviewer and cultural commentator. She is the co-founder of Tech LadyMafia and she co-hosted the podcast Call Your Girlfriend with her friend, the journalist and editor Ann Friedman. Together, they also wrote the best-selling book Big Friendship. Sow was named to Forbes 30 under 30 in Tech in 2014.

== Early life and education ==
Sow was born in Guinea on April 8, 1985 to a diplomat father and engineer mother. Because of her father's job, the family moved often and Sow grew up in Nigeria, Belgium, and France. She speaks five languages.

Despite the fact that she grew up in a conservative Muslim household, they were untraditional in the way that they encouraged their daughters to succeed and told them they could accomplish anything boys could. While growing up, Sow looked to the United States as a place of possibility and convinced her parents to send her to a small American boarding school, while she worked on her accent by watching TV.

Sow moved the United States at the age of 19 to attend the University of Texas at Austin, where she studied government.

== Career ==
Graduating just before the 2008 financial crisis, she went through a stressful process of finding a job in Washington, D.C., which would help her secure the visa she needed to stay in the country. First taking a job at a toy store to support herself, Sow faced being deported back to Guinea, a country where she had never lived. Sow successfully applied for asylum and eventually moved on to work at a think tank, followed by a PR agency, and then Iraq and Afghanistan Veterans of America.

Since getting started in D.C., Sow has worked in many fields, from podcasting to digital strategy and authoring a book. When interviewed for The New York Times, Sow said "I don't think there's a title for what I do." She has worked as a digital consultant and strategist for well-known brands such as Smartwater and State Farm and run marketing for Google's civic initiatives, but she is best known for being a podcast host. She also frequently moderates panels and does live interviews with public figures and authors. Sow has stated that when she absolutely has to give a single job title, she looks back at which category of work formed the largest percentage of her income that year and says that as her current title.

Sow also appears in the documentary RBG about Supreme Court justice Ruth Bader Ginsburg because of popularizing the meme "Can't Spell Truth Without Ruth".

=== Call Your Girlfriend ===
Sow co-hosted the popular feminist podcast Call Your Girlfriend with her friend, Ann Friedman, which launched in June 2014 and ended in February 2022 with 359 episodes. The show reached #28 on the iTunes Podcast chart, and was produced by former NPR producer Gina Delvac. Friedman, Sow, and Delvac were driven to create the podcast specifically to infiltrate the space and deliver more female-friendly content. Sow described the process, "Every week we call each other to discuss everything from politics to pop culture through a feminist lens. It’s a lot of fun but we are also definitely running a small, profitable media company."

==== Shine Theory ====
Sow and Friedman popularized the term "Shine Theory". The term is in reference to the commitment to collaborating with, befriending and supporting other women instead of competing with them. The term first appeared in Friedman's article for The Cut for NYMag.com in 2013 and has since been adopted by many. Sow has said, "Women are stronger when they hunt in packs."

==== Big Friendship ====
Sow and Friedman co-wrote Big Friendship: How We Keep Each Other Close which was released July 17, 2020. The book is a hybrid, combining memoir with cultural criticism and "an examination of friendship’s role in society." As the title suggests, they introduce a new concept of 'big friendship' to emphasize the importance of friendships in our lives and create a term to describe the close friendships which can be as much or more influential in our lives than romantic partnerships. Sow described the lack of vocabulary they both found to describe their close adult friendships in their 30s, including their own decade-long friendship,

"There is something about the words bestie or BFF or even best friend that imply that it’s an exclusive relationship that you have with one person. And it feels a little infantilizing to me. [...] This term big friendship was meant to define friendships that are complicated and nuanced, friendships that you have had for a long time and that you want to keep in your life for a long time."

One of the reasons for giving friendships a term to express their seriousness was to encourage readers "to stop seeing these relationships as something that can be put on hold while we focus on careers or marriages or children." Instead, they make the argument, friendship is actually one of life's most important foundations.

=== Tech LadyMafia ===
Sow co-founded Tech LadyMafia in 2011 with friend Erie Meyer. It is an invitation-only listserv, or mailing list, with over 2,000 members which connects women working in the field of technology around the globe. In a similar origin story to Call Your Girlfriend, where she was told that women didn't do podcasts, Sow started Tech LadyMafia after someone shared an article with her about "how there's seven women who can computer in the country". This did not line up with her own experience as a woman in tech and having plenty of female friends also working in tech. She realized along with Meyer that part of the issue was visibility and they set out to "highlight the work of women who were already there." The goal of group is to help women find jobs, fix coding problems, seek career advice and have a platform where female friendships can be built; essentially it is a networking service.

=== Other podcasting projects ===
Aminatou Sow hosted season one of a Pineapple Street Media and Wieden + Kennedy podcast focused on travel for women of color called On She Goes, which has also grown as its own digital platform.

Sow has also hosted State Farm's podcast called Color Full Lives.

In 2022, Sow's interview with Debbie Millman was featured on the Storybound (podcast) season 5 premiere.

=== Politics ===
In October 2023, Sow signed an open letter to Joe Biden, President of the United States, of artists calling for a ceasefire of the Israeli bombardment of Gaza.

== Honors and awards ==
In 2014, Sow was named to Forbes 30 Under 30 list, which cited her work on Tech LadyMafia as well as her job as digital engagement director for veterans organization IAVA.

In 2016, Sow was named as one of KQED's Women to Watch.

== Personal life ==
Sow now lives in Brooklyn and her family lives in political exile in Belgium. She describes herself as a nomad.

In December 2017, Sow publicly announced that she had been diagnosed with endometrial cancer. In April 2018, she stated that she had been in remission for a month. Sow has also openly discussed the effect of the treatments, including the difficulties of going through menopause.

Sow has also been open about dealing with depression and anxiety, therapy and taking medicine. She has said she is so open to hopefully help others and reduce the stigma around mental health,

"I know very few people who don’t struggle with mental health issues, so I am unapologetically open about my own. There is no shame. I’m a productive member of society with a couple of broken neurotransmitters. Not to be all Ina Garten about it, but if you can’t make your own neurotransmitters, store-bought are fine."

== See also ==
- Ann Friedman
- Rembert Browne
- Ruth Ann Harnisch
