= Call Your Girlfriend (podcast) =

Conversational feminist podcast

- Genre: Feminist; talk; human interest; culture; interview
- Format: Conversational, interviews
- Language: English

Creative team
- Created by: Ann Friedman, Aminatou Sow, Gina Delvac

Cast and voices
- Hosted by: Ann Friedman and Aminatou Sow

Music
- Opening theme: Call Your Girlfriend by Robyn
- Composed by: All themes and music other than the opening by Carolyn Pennypacker Riggs

Production
- Production: Gina Delvac, Jordan Bailey
- Length: Ranges, generally 30-60 minutes

Publication
- Original release: June 2014 – February 2022
- Updates: Weekly on Fridays

Related
- Website: www.callyourgirlfriend.com

Call Your Girlfriend is a conversation and interview-style podcast co-hosted by journalist Ann Friedman and digital strategist Aminatou Sou, two friends living on opposite coasts of the US. The podcast was described as a cultural phenomenon where the hosts discussed feminism, politics and pop culture, ranging from the very serious (police abolition or abortion rights) to reality TV (Kardashians and Love is Blind).

Started in 2014, the show became popular long before the media form of podcasting grew to its current scale and mainstream interest. In 2017 alone, the podcast had 6.1 million downloads and a live tour with sold-out shows in New York, Washington, San Francisco and Boston. The co-hosts also co-wrote a book, Big Friendship, published in 2020. The podcast posted its final episode on February 10, 2022.

== About ==
Friedman and Sow started the podcast at the behest of their mutual friend Gina Delvac, after Friedman moved across the country to the opposite coast of Sow. They decided to turn their weekly catch-up phone calls into a show. The tagline of the show was "a podcast for long distance besties everywhere." The podcast launched June 2014 and has once reached #28 on the iTunes Podcast chart. Episodes came out every week over the course of eight years, creating an extensive backlog of over 350 episodes.

Throughout the entire run of the show it was produced by former NPR producer Gina Delvac. Friedman, Sow, and Delvac were driven to create the show to specifically "deliver more female-friendly content" in a very male-dominated podcasting space. Sow has even recounted a specific conversation where they were told by a man that "women don't make podcasts." Centering the podcast on female friendship with two female hosts proudly talking like women are socialized to (with 'likes' and uptalk) was an act of activism and a direct response to the industry. The authenticity and causal nature of friendship could be difficult to duplicate in a recorded medium though. Delvac has talked about her role as a producer, jumping in to give context or bring the conversation back on track, as the art form of maintaining just the right amount casual vibes to feel authentic while remaining on topic. She described the process, "We're distilling friendship to a public medium [...] It's one thing to just be friends talking on the phone, but it's another to perform it for others."

Initially the podcast featured the two friends recording casual phone conversations of them catching up, allowing listeners to eavesdrop on their thoughts about politics and pop culture. Sow and Friedman would each arrive to their recording sessions (taking place in their closets) with a short list of personal topics, pop culture and news events share with each other. Sow described this initial approach, "We set out to have fun and work with each other and explore a different medium." Eventually, the show evolved beyond these personal agendas to have recurring segments, a theme for each show and guest interviews. Friedman has said that she "never expected that the project would turn into a live touring series, a platform for interviews with guests including Hillary Clinton, Gloria Steinem, and Stacey Abrams" and eventually a book deal. Despite the initial casual approach, the show quickly built a large audience and the three friends became business partners, co-owning Call Your Girlfriend LLC, which allowed them to sustain the podcast and remain independent throughout.

== Themes ==
=== Feminism and activism ===
One of the central themes of the show, almost every episode touched on feminism and activism in one form or another. The hosts have described the podcast as "unapologetically feminist," and often talk about the difference between female empowerment and being part of the feminist political movement (the podcast falling into the second category). Specific topics covered include food justice, police abolition, sex work, reproductive justice, Black Lives Matter, and universal basic income among many others. They also at one point had an ongoing segment called "This Week in Menstruation" and a newsletter titled "The Bleed."

=== Work, money and "Shine Theory" ===
The hosts openly discussed their career trajectories, how much money they made and the theory they coined about supporting other women in their industries called "Shine Theory." In interviews they have mentioned that because of this, women often come to them for work-related advice.

Initially the three women behind Call Your Girlfriend did not earn any money from the project but over time figured out how to get compensated for their work, sharing the process publicly in an episode titled "Businesswoman Special" (2017) and a follow-up with a tongue-in-cheek title, "Podcast Millionaires" (2019).

=== Friendship ===
Female friendship and recognizing its importance were central themes on the show, which then led to the book the two hosts wrote together, Big Friendship, and the associated themed episodes called the "Summer of Friendship." Bustle described the show, "Call Your Girlfriend is a celebration of a specific kind of all-encompassing friendship — one that carries just as much weight as any romantic relationship." Friedman has described the intention behind giving female friendship space on the podcast,

There needs to be more popular media featuring women’s conversations with each other about things that are not their relationships with men. And so really we just try to do that [...] We’re really tackling this idea of, what would it look like to give friendship its due? To really center it, and talk about it, in the way that we believe it deserves to be.

=== Books ===
They frequently had seasonal books themed episodes, such as "Fall Books 2018" or "Winter Books 2019" where the hosts talked about what they had been reading and interview authors. Beyond these episodes, they regularly invite writers and journalists on to the show.

== Reception ==
Design Matters described the podcast: "It's hilarious. It's emotional. It's freewheeling and powerful. As a listener, you really do feel like you're eavesdropping on—and sometimes partaking in—a conversation between Sow and Friedman; their honesty and authenticity rings true, and is inescapable."
