= The Nix =

2016 novel by Nathan Hill

- First edition
- Author: Nathan Hill
- Language: English
- Publisher: Knopf
- Publication date: 30 August 2016
- Publication place: United States
- Media type: Print (hardback and paperback)
- ISBN: 978-1-101-94661-9

The Nix is the 2016 debut novel by American writer Nathan Hill. The story spans multiple decades and follows the life of Samuel Andresen-Anderson, and his mother who abandoned him. The narration follows multiple perspectives and is told non-linearly, jumping between the contemporary 2011 and the past of both Samuel and his mother.

== Plot ==
The Nix is an American epic novel in ten parts that follows community college professor of English, Samuel Andresen-Anderson who is struggling to find meaning in his life in the years following his failure to write a book which he had already been paid an advance for. He was abandoned by his mother at a young age. Samuel seeks comfort in junk food, an acerbic inner-monologue, and a Second-Life-style internet game called Elfscape. He generally struggles with motivation and self-respect. One day, Samuel discovers that the mother who abandoned him is now a radical leftist activist who is under arrest for assaulting a public figure. When his editor (still after him for the book for which he was given an advance) persuades Samuel to track down his mother, Samuel must confront and discover the various serpentine, complex, and at times, humorous figures and sub-plots from his youth to arrive. The book captures various periods of his mother's life and touches on many themes including isolation, friendship, love, life purpose, the Vietnam War, the Iraq War, female oppression, and the digital age.

== Reception ==
Emily Forland, an agent at Brandt & Hochman Literary, reviewed the novel for Publishers Weekly, stating "Hill skillfully blends humor and darkness, imagery and observation."

Kirkus Reviews hailed the novel as "a grand entertainment, smart and well-paced, and a book that promises good work to come."

=== Reviews ===
- The Guardian
- The Independent
- The New York Times
- NPR
- Kenyon Review
- Christian Science Monitor
- USA Today
- The Washington Post

=== Awards and nominations ===
- 2016 Art Seidenbaum Award for First Fiction of the Los Angeles Times Book Prize (Won)
- NBCC Leonard Award for Best Debut of the Year (Nominated)

==== Book of the Year ====
- New York Times
- The Washington Post
- NPR
- Amazon
- Slate
- The Huffington Post
- The Guardian
- Library Journal
- BuzzFeed
- Electric Lit
- Chicago Tribune
- USA Today
- Publisher's Lunch

==== #1 Book of the Year ====
- Audible
- Entertainment Weekly
