= Nichole Perkins =

American poet

- Born: Nashville, Tennessee, U.S.
- Occupations: Poet, writer, podcaster
- Years active: 2017 – present
- Known for: Thirst Aid Kit
- Notable work: Sometimes I Trip on How Happy We Could Be

Nichole Perkins is an American poet, writer, and podcaster. Perkins co-hosted the podcast Thirst Aid Kit with Bim Adewunmi (2017-2020). She is the author of the poetry collection Lilith, But Dark (2018) and the memoir Sometimes I Trip on How Happy We Could Be (2021).

== Life and career ==
Perkins was born and raised in Nashville, Tennessee. Growing up she was an avid reader of books by authors such as Beverly Cleary and Mildred Taylor. She also began reading romance novels during childhood. She received her bachelor's degree from Dillard University, an HBCU in New Orleans.

Perkins relocated to New York City in 2017 to pursue a professional writing career after receiving an Emerging Writers Fellowship at BuzzFeed. She published personal essays as a part of the fellowship and drafted many essays that would later be included in her memoir. In that position she and her colleague Bim Adewunmi started the podcast Thirst Aid Kit after bonding over their shared enjoyment of discussing celebrity crushes. The podcast, which debuted in 2017, received positive reception and was called "an instant serotonin boost" by Justine Goode for Vanity Fair. The hosts decided to retire Thirst Aid Kit in 2020.

Perkins published her first book, a poetry collection called Lilith, But Dark, in 2018 under Publishing Genius. Amber Tamblyn wrote in a review for Bust, "Nichole Perkins has written a beautifully aching and illuminating portrait of a Black woman’s life in her essential collection, Lilith, But Dark."

She released Sometimes I Trip on How Happy We Could Be on August 17, 2021 under Grand Central Publishing. The book, the majority of which she wrote after the onset of the COVID-19 pandemic, is a memoir and essay collection that combines Perkins’ reflections on pop culture in connection to her life experiences ranging from past relationships, mental health, family dynamics, and sexuality. The title comes from a lyric in the Prince song "If I Was Your Girlfriend." The book received positive reception from outlets such as Publishers Weekly, Bitch, and others.

In 2021 Perkins started the podcast This Is Good For You that explores various things that bring joy and pleasure. She plans to release a romance novel sometime in the next few years.

== Personal life ==
Perkins resides in Brooklyn.

== Works ==
=== Books ===
- Perkins, Nichole (2018). Lilith, But Dark. Publishing Genius. ISBN 9781945028144.
- Perkins, Nichole (2021). Sometimes I Trip on How Happy We Could Be. Grand Central Publishing. ISBN 9781538702741.

=== Podcasts ===
- Thirst Aid Kit (2017–2020). Co-hosted with Bim Adewunmi.
- This Is Good For You (2021–present).
- The Prince Mixtape (2023)
