= Nathan Hill (writer) =

American fiction writer

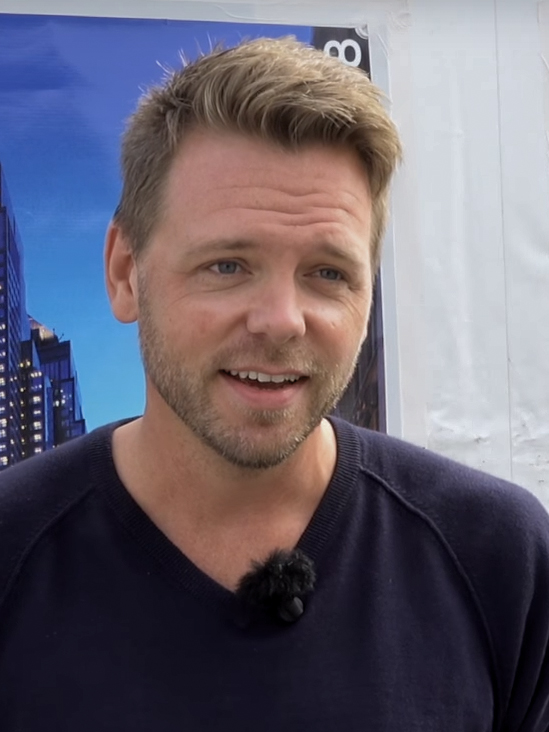
- Born: 1975 (age 50–51); Cedar Rapids, Iowa, U.S.
- Education: University of Iowa; University of Massachusetts Amherst
- Occupations: Writer, journalist
- Spouse: Jenni
- Writing career
- Language: English
- Notable work: The Nix
- Notable awards: 2016 Art Seidenbaum Award for First Fiction, part of Los Angeles Times Book Prize
- Website: nathanhill.net

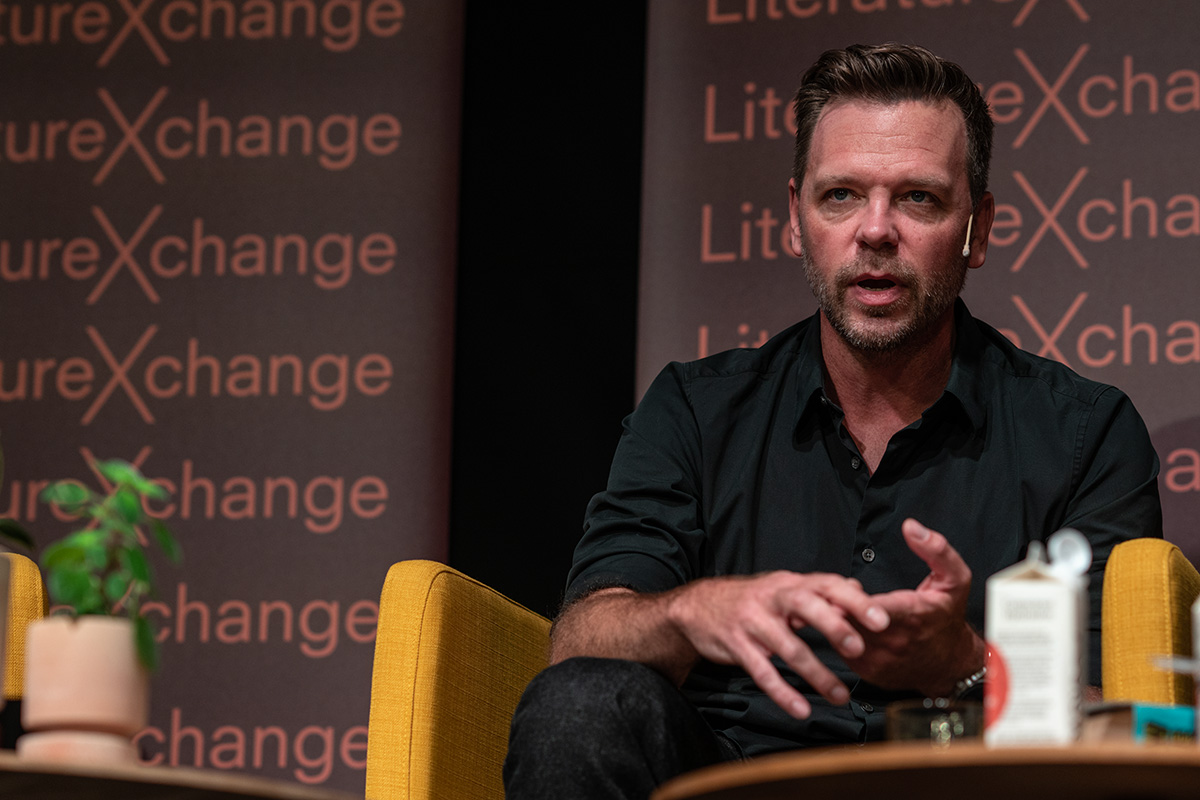
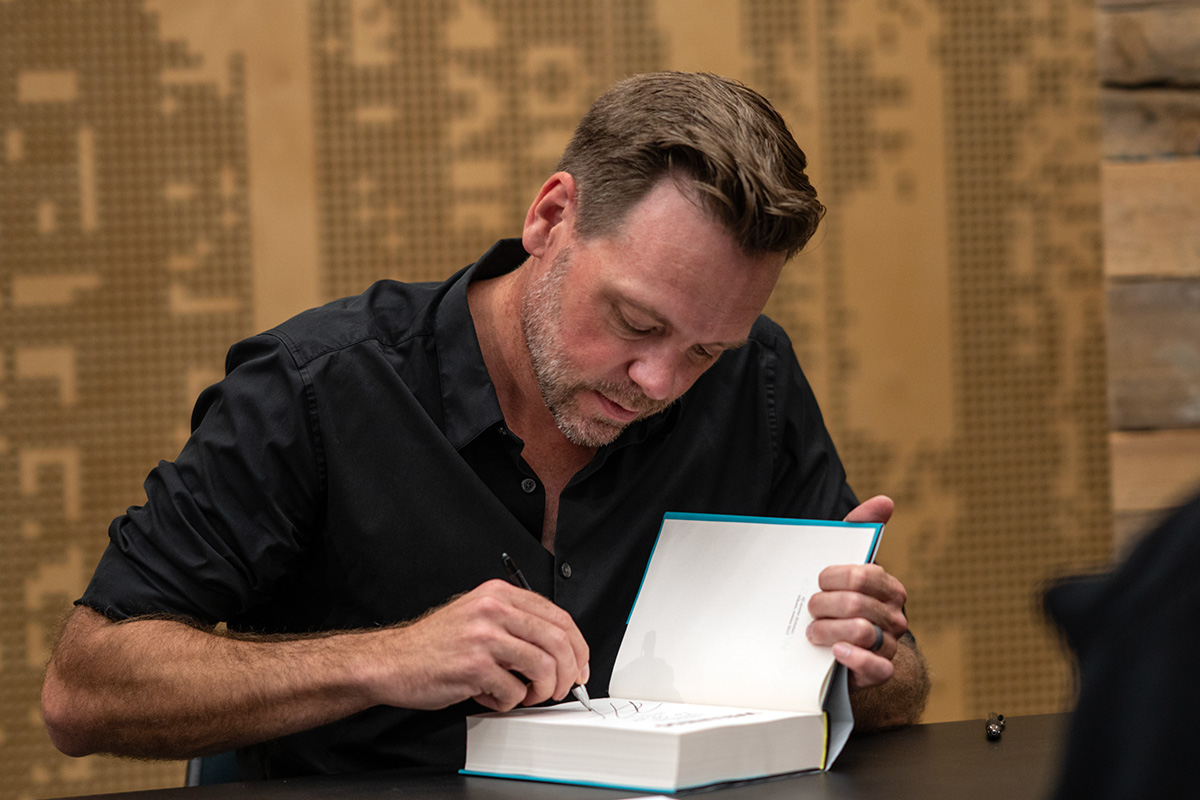
LiteratureXcange Festival
(Denmark 2023)

Nathan Hill (born 1975) is an American fiction writer and journalist. He won the 2016 Art Seidenbaum Award for First Fiction of the Los Angeles Times Book Prize for his novel The Nix.

In September 2023, Hill's novel Wellness was selected by Oprah Winfrey as a selection for her Oprah's Book Club 2.0.

== Early life and education ==
Hill was born in Cedar Rapids, Iowa in 1975, where his grandparents had worked as corn, soybean and cattle farmers. Growing up, his family moved around the Midwest frequently as his father worked his way up through management at Kmart. Hill lived at various times in Illinois, Missouri, Oklahoma and Kansas.

Hill attended the University of Iowa, intending to study biomedical engineering, but switched to a major in English and journalism when he realized he could take classes in creative writing. He was a reporter on The Daily Iowan and graduated in 1999.

== Career ==
Hill became a reporter for The Gazette in Cedar Rapids, Iowa. He appreciated the discipline of writing and editing for a newspaper. After two years in Cedar Rapids, he pursued a master of fine arts (MFA) at University of Massachusetts Amherst. His first novel The Nix required extensive research, which his journalism work prepared him for.

Hill moved to New York City in his twenties and attempted to establish himself as a short story writer. After several setbacks, including rejections from publishers and a 2004 car break-in in which his drafts were stolen, he temporarily stopped writing and instead spent his time playing video games. After quitting gaming and returning to writing he spent the next 10 years working on his first novel, which was published in 2016 to acclaim. There were competitions for the rights to publish it in other countries.

Hill traveled across the world to give talks about The Nix, taking time from his paying job as a professor at the University of South Florida, which he quit. His second novel Wellness was published in 2023 and was widely reviewed as a satire on modern life. He continues to write articles as a journalist for various outlets.

== Bibliography ==
=== Novels ===
- The Nix (Alfred A. Knopf, 2016, ISBN 978-1101946619)
- Wellness (Alfred A. Knopf, 2023, ISBN 978-0593536117)

== Personal life ==
Hill is married and lives in Naples, Florida. His wife Jenni is a bassoonist in the Naples Philharmonic.
