= Mohawk Productions =

American television production company

- Industry: Television production
- Founded: 1991; 35 years ago
- Founder: Bruce Helford
- Headquarters: Los Angeles, California, United States

Mohawk Productions is a television production company affiliated with television producer Bruce Helford. The company's logo is an ultrasound image of Aven Helford, son of Bruce Helford.

== Productions ==
=== Former/current series and shows ===
Show	Creator(s)	Year(s)	Co-production(s)	Network	Notes
Someone Like Me	Bruce Helford	1994	Sandollar Television; Touchstone Television	NBC	First show created by the company.
Bless This House	Bruce Helford	1995–1996	Warner Bros. Television	CBS	
The Drew Carey Show	Bruce Helford; Drew Carey	1995–2004	Warner Bros. Television	ABC	
The Norm Show	Bruce Helford; Norm Macdonald	1999–2001	Warner Bros. Television	ABC	
Nikki	Bruce Helford	2000–2002	Warner Bros. Television	The WB	
The Oblongs	Angus Oblong; Jace Richdale	2001–2002	Oblong Productions; Film Roman; Jobsite Productions; Warner Bros. Television	The WB	The only animated series to date to be produced by Mohawk Productions. Only show not created by Helford.
George Lopez	George Lopez; Bruce Helford; Robert Borden	2002–2007	Fortis Films; Warner Bros. Television	ABC	
Wanda at Large	Bruce Helford; Les Firestein; Wanda Sykes; Lance Crouther	2003	Warner Bros. Television	Fox	
Freddie	Conrad Jackson; Freddie Prinze Jr. Bruce Rasmussen; Bruce Helford	2005–2006	Hunga Rican; Excitable Boy! Warner Bros. Television	ABC	
Anger Management	Bruce Helford	2012–2014	Revolution Studios; Estevez/Sheen Productions; Twisted Television; Lionsgate Television; Debmar-Mercury; 20th Television	FX	
Kevin Can Wait	Kevin James; Rock Reuben; Bruce Helford	2016–2018	Hey Eddie Productions; CBS Television Studios; Sony Pictures Television	CBS	Season 1 only, with 13 episodes only.
Roseanne	Matt Williams	2018	Carsey-Werner Productions	ABC	Revival season only.
The Conners	Matt Williams	2018–2025	Sara + Tom; Gilbert TV; Jax Media; Werner Entertainment	ABC	Spin-off/continuation to Rosanne.
Lopez vs Lopez	George Lopez; Mayan Lopez; Debby Wolfe	2022–2025	Travieso Productions; Mi Vida Loba; 3 Arts Entertainment; Universal Television	NBC	
Newlyweds	Jamie Lee Curtis; Gail Lerner	2026–present	Keep Good Company; Comet Pictures; The Tannenbaum Company; Lionsgate Television; Universal Television	NBC	
