= Chris Estrada (comedian) =

American comedian

- Born: Los Angeles, California, U.S.
- Occupations: Comedian, writer, producer, actor
- Years active: 2013–present
- Notable work: This Fool

Chris Estrada is an American comedian, writer, and producer. He is the co-creator and star of the Hulu comedy series This Fool (2022–2023).

== Life and career ==
Estrada was born and raised in Los Angeles, in multiracial working class neighborhoods in South Central and Inglewood. He was raised bilingual, speaking Spanish with his mother, a Mexican immigrant.

After high school he took community college courses and worked several different jobs, including as a warehouse worker unloading trucks. When Estrada was 29 he went to Maverick's Flat to perform his first open mic, and from there continued to perform as a stand-up comedian. In 2018 he was recognized by Time Out L.A. as one of ten comics to watch. The next year he recorded a set for Comedy Central Up Next. In 2021 Vulture named him to the list "Comedians You Should and Will Know."

Estrada and Matt Ingebretson developed a television show inspired by Estrada's life, which Fred Armisen eventually came on to executive produce. Only after the pitch sold in 2019 did Estrada quit his full-time warehouse job.

In 2021 it was announced that Hulu picked up the series, eventually titled This Fool. The first season was released in 2022 and received critical acclaim. The second season debuted in July 2023. Hulu cancelled the series in February 2024. Estrada went on a stand-up tour later that year.

In 2025 Estrada appeared in a supporting role on Lopez vs Lopez as a love interest for Rosie. As of July 2025 he is the co-creator and star of the in-development comedy series Forklift at NBC.

== Accolades ==
- 2023 – Nominee, Imagen Award for Best Actor, Comedy - Television (for This Fool)
