= Dale Godboldo =

American television and film actor (born 1975)

- Born: Dale Eugene Godboldo, Jr. July 5, 1975 (age 50); Dallas, Texas, U.S.
- Other names: Dale Godboldo, Jr.
- Occupations: Actor; producer
- Years active: 1991–present

Dale Eugene Godboldo, Jr. (born July 5, 1975) is an American television and film actor.

== Early life ==
Godboldo was born in Dallas, Texas.

== Career ==
He started his career on Disney's The All New Mickey Mouse Club as an actor, singer, and dancer. He appeared in guest roles on Moesha and had a recurring role on the short-lived UPN series Goode Behavior.

He made his film debut in the 1999 film Dirt Merchant, followed by roles in ER and Promised Land. In 1999, he co-starred in another short-lived UPN series Shasta McNasty. After the series was canceled in 2000, Goldboldo had a role on the NBC series Kristin, starring Kristin Chenoweth. In 2003, he portrayed Keith Townsend on the Fox sitcom Wanda at Large. Since its cancellation in 2003, he has guest starred on Courting Alex, Commander in Chief, and Women's Murder Club. Godboldo played Cooper in the short-lived show Jenny that starred Jenny MaCarthy and George Hamilton. In 2008, he had a role in the thriller Lakeview Terrace, starring Samuel L. Jackson. He starred as lawyer Carl E. Douglas in The People v. O. J. Simpson: American Crime Story.

== Philanthropy ==
Godboldo has fundraised for a wide range of efforts including education and arts training, gender equality, early childhood development, the eradication of poverty, ending human trafficking, feeding the homeless, promoting good health and well-being, economic empowerment through entrepreneurship training, and the facilitation of live organ transplants to save lives. Beneficiaries have included THORN, Feed A Billion, INROADS, Clinton Foundation, Just Keep Livin Foundation, Quincy Jones Foundation, Charlize Theron Africa Outreach Project, Breed Life, Child Liberation Foundation, My Life My Power, Firelife Foundation, and The Jenesse Project, among many others.

Honorees and special guests of Godboldo's events have included President Bill Clinton, President George W. Bush, Robert De Niro, James Cameron, Matthew McConaughey, Diddy, Richard Branson, John Travolta, Quincy Jones, Martin Scorsese, Eva Longoria, Selena Gomez, Demi Lovato, Sean Penn, Jada Pinkett Smith, Charlize Theron, and Halle Berry, among others.

Godboldo currently executive produces Unite4: Humanity as President of ARG Media, and operates his businesses under the brand, Dale Godboldo Enterprises.

Godboldo formed the Always In The Club Foundation in appreciation of the training and mentorship he received as a young man on the Mickey Mouse Club.

Godboldo recently executive produced #MMC30 – The ‘All-New’ Mickey Mouse Club Cast Reunion & 30th Anniversary Celebration at Walt Disney Resort benefitting Always In The Club, and Central Florida's onePULSE Foundation and Give Kids The World Village.

With help from President Bill Clinton, Godboldo launched Project:NOW – a non-profit initiative that rapidly addresses the educational needs of at-risk youth in America. Its first fundraiser was held in New York with George W. Bush on September 24, 2014. The evening was sponsored by Amway and Unite4:Good, and hosted by The Good Wife's Chris Noth.

== Filmography ==
Film
Year	Film	Role	Notes
1999	Dirt Merchant	Zeke the Geek	
1999	Cold Hearts	Connor	
2000	The Young Unknowns	Franklin	
2001	Firetrap	Vincent	
2002	The Sum of All Fears	Rudy	
2002	Random Shooting in L.A.	Todd	
2002	New Suit	Power Agent #1	
2003	Timecop 2: The Berlin Decision	Tech #1	Direct-to-DVD release
2007	Year of the Dog	Don	
2008	Lakeview Terrace	Dale	
2009	Fame	Music Executive	
2011	Thor	Agent Garrett	
Television
Year	Title	Role	Notes
1991-1996	The All-New Mickey Mouse Club	Himself	Seasons 4-7
1996	Moesha	Donny	1 episode
1996–1997	Goode Behavior	Eric	4 episodes
1997	Mad About You	Professor Tomassi's Student	1 episode
1997	Jenny	Cooper	Recurring
1998	Smart Guy	Victor	1 episode
1999	Caroline in the City	Hairbrush Guy	1 episode
1999	ER	Hiltzik	1 episode
1999	Promised Land	Nolan Edwards	1 episode
1999–2000	Shasta McNasty	Randy	Main
2001	Kristin	Tyrique Kimbrough	Recurring
2001	The Drew Carey Show	Gerard	1 episode
2002	Judging Amy	Richie Cunningham	1 episode
2003	Wanda at Large	Keith Michael Townsend	Recurring
2004	Method & Red	Keith Debeetham	1 episode
2006	Courting Alex	Mark/Big Dog	2 episodes
2006	Commander in Chief		1 episode
2007	Women's Murder Club	Logan Young	1 episode
2009	Bones	Dr. Jonah Amayo	1 episode
2016	The People v. O. J. Simpson: American Crime Story	Carl E. Douglas	Recurring
2016	My Thai Life	Mr. Darren	Pre-production
2017	Colony	Eric	1 episode
