= George Sunga =

American director and producer (1932–2023)

- Born: George Arcega Sunga; October 2, 1932
- Died: November 7, 2023 (aged 91)
- Education: San Diego State University
- Occupations: Director, producer
- Years active: 1963–2006
- Spouse: Judy Sunga

George Arcega Sunga (October 2, 1932 – November 7, 2023) was an American director and producer. He was known for producing the American sitcom television series Three's Company (and its spin-offs The Ropers and Three's a Crowd).

== Early life and career ==
Sunga was raised in San Diego, California and is of Filipino descent, where he attended San Diego State University in the early 1950s. He began his career in 1963, as a production supervisor for the short-lived musical variety television series The Judy Garland Show.

Sunga later produced and directed other television programs including All in the Family, The Jeffersons, The Redd Foxx Show, Good Times, The Smothers Brothers Comedy Hour, Dear John, The Good Life, Gung Ho, Someone Like Me and Perfect Station. In 1969, Sunga was nominated for a Primetime Emmy for Outstanding Variety or Musical Series.

In 1972, Sunga was an associate producer of the television film Of Thee I Sing. He retired in 2006, last directing and producing for the television film, John Ritter: Working with a Master.

== Death ==
Sunga died on November 7, 2023, at the age of 91.
