= Lopez vs Lopez =

2022 American sitcom

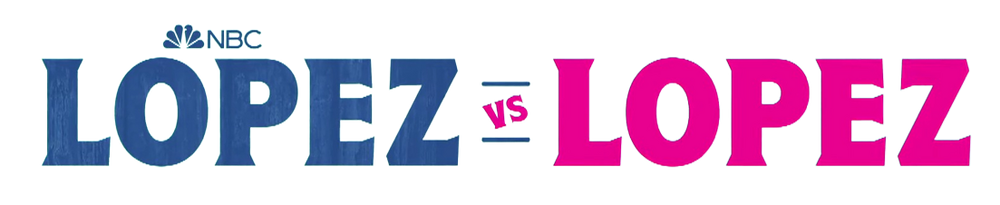
- Genre: Sitcom
- Created by: George Lopez; Mayan Lopez; Debby Wolfe
- Showrunners: Debby Wolfe; Bruce Helford
- Starring: George Lopez; Mayan Lopez; Matt Shively; Brice Gonzalez; Selenis Leyva; Al Madrigal
- Opening theme: "Lopez vs Lopez Theme"
- Composer: Raney Shockne
- Country of origin: United States
- Original language: English
- No. of seasons: 3
- No. of episodes: 45

Production
- Executive producers: Debby Wolfe; Bruce Helford; George Lopez; Michael Rotenberg; Katie Newman; Barbara Stoll; Mayan Lopez (season 2); Marcos Luevanos; Lesley Wake Webster; Dan Signer; Eddie Quintana
- Producers: Mayan Lopez (season 1); Erica Harrell; Desiree Proctor; Marc Solakian; Suzy Mamann-Greenberg (pilot only)
- Camera setup: Multi-camera
- Running time: 22 minutes
- Production companies: Mi Vida Loba Productions; Mohawk Productions; Travieso Productions; 3 Arts Entertainment; Universal Television

Original release
- Network: NBC
- Release: November 4, 2022 – February 7, 2025

Lopez vs Lopez is an American sitcom created by George Lopez, Mayan Lopez and Debby Wolfe that premiered on NBC on November 4, 2022. Wolfe also serves as showrunner with Bruce Helford and is executive producer. It stars Lopez and his daughter Mayan as fictionalized versions of themselves along with Matt Shively, Brice Gonzalez, Al Madrigal, and Selenis Leyva in supporting roles. This series marked Lopez's second return to television series since Lopez ended in 2017. In May 2023, the series was renewed for a second season which premiered on April 2, 2024. In May 2024, the series was renewed for a third season which premiered on October 18, 2024. In May 2025, the series was canceled after three seasons.

== Premise ==
George, the owner of a moving company that went bankrupt is forced to move into his daughter Mayan’s house. The problem is that Mayan and George have just started speaking after being estranged for most of her teenage years. Now they seek to heal their relationship and learn more about each other. With this, Mayan, along with her boyfriend, Quinten, and their son, Chance, are trying to adjust to their new living arrangements with George. In addition, they are also having to adapt to Mayan's mom and George's ex-wife, Rosie, dropping by unannounced, usually to either see Mayan and Chance, or to throw shade at George.

== Cast and characters ==
=== Main ===
- George Lopez as George, Mayan's father
- Mayan Lopez as Mayan, George's daughter
- Matt Shively as Quinten Mark Van Bryan, Mayan's fiance
- Brice Gonzalez as Chance Lopez-Van Bryan, Mayan & Quinten's son and George's grandson
- Selenis Leyva as Rosie Flores Lopez, George's ex-wife and Mayan's mother
- Al Madrigal as Oscar Rivera, an employee and friend of George's who is frequently stoned
- Noel the Rescue Dog as Churro, the chihuahua family Dog

=== Recurring ===
- Laci Mosley as Brookie, Mayan's co-worker and friend
- Aparna Nancherla as Dr. Pocha, a veterinarian and Mayan's boss
- Caroline Rhea as Jana, a rich pushy lady at Mayan's vet
- Moises Chavez as Raul, one of George's employees and friends
- Liz Torres as Daisy, Rosie's sister
- Rita Moreno as Dolores Lopez, George's grandmother
- Cheech Marin as Carlos, Rosie's Curandero
- Stephen Tobolowsky as Sam Van Bryan, Quinten's father
- Momo Rodriguez as Momo, one of George's employees and friends
- Jaime Camil as Josué Consuelos, Rosie's boyfriend
- Terri Hoyos as Elsa Lopez, George's mother

=== Guest stars ===
- Jerry Garcia as Mando, one of George's employees who has become a friend
- Adam Kulbersh as Jerry, a Homeowner association member who collects action figures
- Maria Canals-Barrera as Lily, Rosie's sister
- Ana Rey as Flor, Rosie's sister
- Nathan Miranda as Robbie
- Constance Marie as Connie
- Valente Rodriguez as Val
- Luis Armand Garcia as Louie
- Belita Moreno as Bella
- Michelle Ortiz as Mrs. Garcia, Chance's substitute teacher
- Neil Flynn as Steve, June's father and George's enemy
- Eden Sher as June, Steve's daughter and Mayan's friend
- Kensie Mills as Paloma, Steve's granddaughter and June's daughter
- Sophia Magaña as Young Mayan
- Harvey Guillen as Miguel, Mayan's cousin
- Jessica Marie Garcia as Yesika, Mayan's cousin
- Chelsea Rendon as Luna, Mayan's cousin
- Jacob Vargas as Javier, Rosie's client
- Gregg Sulkin as Dr. Bell
- Justina Machado as Beatrice 'Bunny' Perez, Rosie's friend
- Lidia Porto as Gina
- Erik Griffin as Don Patino, Mayan's ex-godfather
- Marilyn Milian as Judge Justicia, a latina TV judge
- Jesus Zapien as Mr. Reyes
- Julie Wittner as Jenny, a client
- Danny Trejo as Danny Martinez, George's rival
- Melissa Fumero as Natalia, a latina single mom
- Snoop Dogg as Calvin, George's new sponsor
- Gabriel "Fluffy" Iglesias as Iggy, George's sponsor
- Vanessa Gonzalez as Gladys, a waitress
- Diana-Maria Riva as Olga, a swap meet vendor
- Alexandra Madison as Kylie
- Jon Bouffard as Jax
- Tommy Chong as Bryan, Oscar's new friend
- Marshawn Lynch as Marshawn, a sideline reporter
- Jim Plunkett as Himself
- Pedro Lopez as Walter
- Scheana Shay as Erica, Justin's husband
- Brock Davies as Justin, Erica's wife
- Lisa Rinna as Lisa Perry, George's client
- Jackie Guerrido as Valencia Santa Domingo
- Michael Irby as Father Ramirez, a pastor
- Tisha Campbell as Dr. Glenda Brenda, Mayan's therapist
- Anthony Anderson as Todd Cheeks
- Mini Kiss as Themselves
- Michael Blaiklock as Nick
- Meredith Paul as Becky
- Al Coronel as Tío Pablo
- Eileen Galindo as Tía Angela
- Vicki Lawrence as Ruthie Van Bryan, Quinten's mother
- Jeff Ross as Jeff, a friend of George's
- Adrian Gonzalez as Rico
- Annie Gonzalez as Annie Dominguez, Mayan's best friend from high school
- Adam Irigoyen as Orlando, Rosie's nephew
- Eli Greenberg as Iker
- Hannah Zamora as Yesi
- Brian Posehn as Nicolas, a Mall Santa who reminds George
- George Paez as Joseph
- Tina D'Marco as Irma
- Francia Raisa as Carina, an entitled social media influencer
- Rizwan Manji as Crispin, an arrogant hardware store employee
- Alexandra Billings as Paula, an exhausted legal mediator who reluctantly presides over Rosie's dispute with her ex-fiance, Josué
- Chris Estrada as Roberto, Quinten's boss
- Santino Jimnez as Gabriel
- Olivia London Leyva as Sofia
- Mario Lopez as Manny, George's cousin

== Episodes ==
=== Series overview ===
Season	Episodes	Originally released		Rank	Average viewership (in millions)	Ref
Season	Episodes	First released	Last released	Rank	Average viewership (in millions)	Ref
1	22	November 4, 2022	May 9, 2023	89	2.40	
2	10	April 2, 2024	April 30, 2024	97	2.15	
3	13	October 18, 2024	February 7, 2025	TBA	TBA	TBA

=== Season 1 (2022–23) ===
No. overall	No. in season	Title	Directed by	Written by	Original release date	U.S. viewers (millions)
1	1	"Pilot"	Kelly Park	Teleplay by : Debby Wolfe; Story by : George Lopez & Mayan Lopez & Debby Wolfe	November 4, 2022	2.66
Note: The song "Low Rider" by War was played at the beginning and end of the episode, which was also used as the theme for The George Lopez Show.
2	2	"Lopez vs Anxiety"	Lynda Tarryk	Debby Wolfe & Bruce Helford	November 11, 2022	2.12
Note: This episode was dedicated to Aarika Lynn Maisak, who died on August 22, 2022.
3	3	"Lopez vs Español"	Kelly Park	Omar Ponce	November 18, 2022	2.06
4	4	"Lopez vs Birthdays"	Phill Lewis	Lesley Wake Webster	December 2, 2022	2.01
5	5	"Lopez vs Gaslighting"	Robbie Countryman	Keith Heisler	December 9, 2022	1.99
6	6	"Lopez vs Christmas"	Kelly Park	Desirée Proctor & Erica Harrell	December 16, 2022	2.17
7	7	"Lopez vs Ghosts"	Bob Koherr	Crystal Shaw	January 6, 2023	1.96
8	8	"Lopez vs Pride"	Kelly Park	Marcos Luevanos	January 13, 2023	2.21
9	9	"Lopez vs Van Bryan"	Bob Koherr	Schuyler Helford	January 20, 2023	2.03
10	10	"Lopez vs Los Doyers"	Gloria Calderón Kellett	Alex Zaragoza	February 3, 2023	1.83
11	11	"Lopez vs Neighbors"	Phill Lewis	Dan Signer	February 10, 2023	1.94
12	12	"Lopez vs Appropriation"	Jody Margolin Hahn	Ananya Menon & Greg Trimmer	February 17, 2023	2.13
13	13	"Lopez vs Second Chances"	Jody Margolin Hahn	Marcos Luevanos & Debby Wolfe	March 3, 2023	1.91
Note: This episode was dedicated to Randy Allen Gonzalez, the father of Brice Gonzalez who plays Chance, who died on January 26, 2023.
14	14	"Lopez vs Work"	Gloria Calderón Kellett	Debby Wolfe & Dan Signer	March 10, 2023	1.96
15	15	"Lopez vs Primos"	Kelly Park	Lesley Wake Webster & Crystal Shaw	March 17, 2023	1.97
16	16	"Lopez vs Cheating"	Danielle Fishel	Desirée Proctor & Erica Harrell	March 24, 2023	1.81
17	17	"Lopez vs Dog Quinces"	Jon Rosenbaum	Marcos Luevanos & Carmen Corral	March 31, 2023	1.83
18	18	"Lopez vs Goosey"	Kelly Park	Jen Howell & Mike Carreon	April 7, 2023	1.81
19	19	"Lopez vs The Godfather"	Phill Lewis	Lesley Wake Webster & Dan Signer	April 21, 2023	1.98
20	20	"Lopez vs Corte Caliente"	Jon Rosenbaum	Omar Ponce & Schuyler Helford	April 25, 2023	1.66
21	21	"Lopez vs Bucket Crabs"	Phill Lewis	Ananya Menon & Greg Trimmer	May 2, 2023	1.93
22	22	"Lopez vs Last Call"	Gloria Calderón Kellett	Debby Wolfe	May 9, 2023	1.57

=== Season 2 (2024) ===
No. overall	No. in season	Title	Directed by	Written by	Original release date	U.S. viewers (millions)
23	1	"Lopez vs Sobriety"	Gloria Calderón Kellett	Debby Wolfe	April 2, 2024	2.33
24	2	"Lopez vs Moving On"	Gloria Calderón Kellett	Lesley Wake Webster	April 2, 2024	1.79
25	3	"Lopez vs Swap Meet"	Danielle Fishel	Marcos Luevanos	April 9, 2024	1.96
26	4	"Lopez vs Pizza"	Danielle Fishel	Dan Signer	April 9, 2024	1.52
27	5	"Lopez vs Let It Go"	Phill Lewis	Teleplay by : Schuyler Helford; Story by : George Lopez	April 16, 2024	2.10
28	6	"Lopez vs Raider Nation"	Phill Lewis	Omar Ponce	April 16, 2024	1.65
29	7	"Lopez vs Dreams"	Phill Lewis	Desirée Proctor & Erica Harrell	April 23, 2024	1.95
30	8	"Lopez vs Lisa"	Kelly Park	Crystal Shaw	April 23, 2024	1.63
31	9	"Lopez vs Confessions"	Kelly Park	Lesley Wake Webster & Marcos Luevanos	April 30, 2024	2.17
32	10	"Lopez vs George"	Kelly Park	Debby Wolfe & Dan Signer	April 30, 2024	1.84

=== Season 3 (2024–25) ===
No. overall	No. in season	Title	Directed by	Written by	Original release date	U.S. viewers (millions)
33	1	"Lopez vs Wedding"	Gloria Calderón Kellett	Debby Wolfe	October 18, 2024	2.12
34	2	"Lopez vs Halloween"	Gloria Calderón Kellett	Omar Ponce	October 25, 2024	1.83
35	3	"Lopez vs In-Laws"	Danielle Fishel	Lesley Wake Webster	November 1, 2024	1.99
36	4	"Lopez vs the Roast of George Lopez"	Danielle Fishel	Marcos Luevanos	November 8, 2024	1.92
37	5	"Lopez vs Friends"	Danielle Fishel	Schuyler Helford	November 15, 2024	1.63
38	6	"Lopez vs Orlando"	Danielle Fishel	Ranada Shephard	November 22, 2024	1.77
39	7	"Lopez vs Santa"	Phill Lewis	Eddie Quintana	December 6, 2024	1.99
40	8	"Lopez vs Dateline"	Kelly Park	Marissa Díaz	December 13, 2024	1.93
41	9	"Lopez vs Escándalo"	Danielle Fishel	Dan Signer	January 3, 2025	2.05
42	10	"Lopez vs Josué"	Phill Lewis	Molly Kiernan	January 10, 2025	2.03
43	11	"Lopez vs Memories"	Kelly Park	Mike Carreon & Gabriela S. Rodriguez	January 17, 2025	2.12
44	12	"Lopez vs Elsa"	Kelly Park	Lesley Wake Webster & Marcos Luevanos	January 31, 2025	2.30
45	13	"Lopez vs Lockout"	Kelly Park	Debby Wolfe & Dan Signer	February 7, 2025	2.07

== Production ==
=== Development ===
The series is created by George Lopez, his daughter Mayan Lopez, and Debby Wolfe, the latter of whom serves as showrunner. The other executive producers are Bruce Helford, George Lopez, Michael Rotenberg, and Katie Newman. Mayan Lopez is also a producer in the writers' room. On June 14, 2021, the series received a put pilot commitment by NBC. On October 22, 2021, the series was given a pilot order. On April 20, 2022, it was announced that Kelly Park would direct the pilot. On May 11, 2022, the series had been given a series order. On December 2, 2022, NBC ordered nine additional episodes, bringing up the season to a total of 22 episodes. On May 12, 2023, NBC renewed the series for a second season. On November 17, 2023, NBC reduced the number of episodes for the second season from 13 to 10. On May 7, 2024, NBC renewed the series for a third season. On November 15, 2024, the series was given additional script orders, making the season total of 13 episodes. On May 9, 2025, NBC canceled the series after three seasons.

=== Casting ===
On April 6, 2022, Selenis Leyva, Al Madrigal, Brice Gonzalez and Matt Shively were cast in main roles for the pilot. Two weeks later, Laci Mosley and Aparna Nancherla were cast in recurring roles for the pilot.

=== Filming ===
Lopez vs Lopez was filmed at Universal Studios Hollywood in Universal City, California, but it is set in Los Angeles, California.

== Release ==
Lopez vs Lopez premiered on November 4, 2022, on NBC. The first season is available to stream on Netflix. The second season premiered on April 2, 2024. The third season premiered on October 18, 2024.

In Canada, the show aired an hour earlier than the American airtime on Citytv.

== Ratings ==
=== Overall ===
Viewership and ratings per season of Lopez vs Lopez
Season	Timeslot (ET)	Episodes	First aired		Last aired		TV season
Season	Timeslot (ET)	Episodes	Date	Viewers (millions)	Date	Viewers (millions)	TV season
1	Friday 8:00 p.m. (1–19); Tuesday 8:30 p.m. (20–22)	22	November 4, 2022	2.66	May 9, 2023	1.57	2022–23
2	Tuesday 8:00 p.m. (1, 3, 5, 7, 9); Tuesday 8:30 p.m. (2, 4, 6, 8, 10)	10	April 2, 2024	2.33	April 30, 2024	1.84	2023–24
3	Friday 8:30 p.m. (1–6, 8–13); Friday 9:45 p.m. (7)	13	October 18, 2024	2.12	February 7, 2025	TBD	2024–25

=== Season 1 ===
Viewership and ratings per episode of Lopez vs Lopez
No.	Title	Air date	Rating (18–49)	Viewers (millions)	DVR (18–49)	DVR viewers (millions)	Total (18–49)	Total viewers (millions)
1	"Pilot"	November 4, 2022	0.3	2.66	0.1	0.66	0.4	3.32
2	"Lopez vs Anxiety"	November 11, 2022	0.3	2.12	0.1	0.55	0.4	2.67
3	"Lopez vs Español"	November 18, 2022	0.3	2.06	TBD	TBD	TBD	TBD
4	"Lopez vs Birthdays"	December 2, 2022	0.3	2.01	TBD	TBD	TBD	TBD
5	"Lopez vs Gaslighting"	December 9, 2022	0.3	1.99	TBD	TBD	TBD	TBD
6	"Lopez vs Christmas"	December 16, 2022	0.3	2.17	TBD	TBD	TBD	TBD
7	"Lopez vs Ghosts"	January 6, 2023	0.3	1.96	0.1	0.44	0.4	2.40
8	"Lopez vs Pride"	January 13, 2023	0.3	2.21	0.1	0.40	0.4	2.61
9	"Lopez vs Van Bryan"	January 20, 2023	0.3	2.03	0.1	0.47	0.4	2.50
10	"Lopez vs Los Doyers"	February 3, 2023	0.2	1.83	TBD	TBD	TBD	TBD
11	"Lopez vs Neighbors"	February 10, 2023	0.3	1.94	TBD	TBD	TBD	TBD
12	"Lopez vs Appropriation"	February 17, 2023	0.3	2.13	TBD	TBD	TBD	TBD
13	"Lopez vs Second Chances"	March 3, 2023	0.2	1.91	TBD	TBD	TBD	TBD
14	"Lopez vs Work"	March 10, 2023	0.3	1.96	TBD	TBD	TBD	TBD
15	"Lopez vs Primos"	March 17, 2023	0.2	1.97	TBD	TBD	TBD	TBD
16	"Lopez vs Cheating"	March 24, 2023	0.2	1.81	TBD	TBD	TBD	TBD
17	"Lopez vs Dog Quinces"	March 31, 2023	0.2	1.83	TBD	TBD	TBD	TBD
18	"Lopez vs Goosey"	April 7, 2023	0.3	1.81	TBD	TBD	TBD	TBD
19	"Lopez vs The Godfather"	April 21, 2023	0.3	1.98	TBD	TBD	TBD	TBD
20	"Lopez vs Corte Caliente"	April 25, 2023	0.2	1.66	TBD	TBD	TBD	TBD
21	"Lopez vs Bucket Crabs"	May 2, 2023	0.3	1.93	TBD	TBD	TBD	TBD
22	"Lopez vs Last Call"	May 9, 2023	0.3	1.57	TBD	TBD	TBD	TBD

=== Season 2 ===
Viewership and ratings per episode of Lopez vs Lopez
No.	Title	Air date	Rating (18–49)	Viewers (millions)
1	"Lopez vs Sobriety"	April 2, 2024	0.3	2.33
2	"Lopez vs. Moving On"	April 2, 2024	0.3	1.79
3	"Lopez vs Swap Meet"	April 9, 2024	0.3	1.96
4	"Lopez vs Pizza"	April 9, 2024	0.2	1.52
5	"Lopez vs Raider Nation"	April 16, 2024	0.3	2.10
6	"Lopez vs Let It Go"	April 16, 2024	0.2	1.65
7	"Lopez vs Dreams"	April 23, 2024	0.2	1.95
8	"Lopez vs Lisa"	April 23, 2024	0.2	1.63
9	"Lopez vs Confessions"	April 30, 2024	0.3	2.17
10	"Lopez vs George"	April 30, 2024	0.3	1.84

=== Season 3 ===
Viewership and ratings per episode of Lopez vs Lopez
No.	Title	Air date	Rating/share (18–49)	Viewers (millions)	DVR (18–49)	DVR viewers (millions)	Total (18–49)	Total viewers (millions)	Ref.
1	"Lopez vs Wedding"	October 18, 2024	0.3/3	2.12	0.1	0.44	0.3	2.56	
2	"Lopez vs Halloween"	October 25, 2024	0.2/2	1.83	0.1	0.47	0.3	2.30	
3	"Lopez vs In-Laws"	November 1, 2024	0.2/3	1.99	0.1	0.44	0.3	2.43	
4	"Lopez vs the Roast of George Lopez"	November 8, 2024	0.2/2	1.92	0.1	0.45	0.3	2.37	
5	"Lopez vs Friends"	November 15, 2024	0.2/3	1.63	0.1	0.46	0.2	2.09	
6	"Lopez vs Orlando"	November 22, 2024	0.2/3	1.77	0.1	0.40	0.3	2.17	
7	"Lopez vs Santa"	December 6, 2024	0.3/4	1.99	0.1	0.42	0.3	2.42	
8	"Lopez vs Dateline"	December 13, 2024	0.2/3	1.93	TBD	TBD	TBD	TBD	
9	"Lopez vs Escándalo"	January 3, 2025	0.2/2	2.05	TBD	TBD	TBD	TBD	
10	"Lopez vs Josué"	January 10, 2025	0.2/2	2.03	TBD	TBD	TBD	TBD	
11	"Lopez vs Memories"	January 17, 2025	0.2/3	2.12	TBD	TBD	TBD	TBD	
12	"Lopez vs Elsa"	January 31, 2025	0.3/4	2.30	TBD	TBD	TBD	TBD	
13	"Lopez vs Lockout"	February 7, 2025	0.2/3	2.07	TBD	TBD	TBD	TBD	

== Accolades ==
George Lopez was nominated at the 2025 Kids' Choice Awards for Favorite Male TV Star (Family).
