= Shasta McNasty =

Sitcom

- Also known as: Shasta
- Genre: Sitcom
- Created by: Jeff Eastin
- Starring: Jake Busey; Carmine Giovinazzo; Dale Godboldo; Jolie Jenkins
- Composers: Dale Godboldo; Rick Ziegler
- Country of origin: United States
- Original language: English
- No. of seasons: 1
- No. of episodes: 22

Production
- Executive producers: Jeff Eastin; Richard Gurman; Neal H. Moritz
- Producers: Jimmy Aleck; Bill Canterbury; Jim Keily; Tracey Ormandy
- Running time: 30 minutes
- Production companies: Neal H. Moritz Productions; Columbia TriStar Television

Original release
- Network: UPN
- Release: October 5, 1999 – August 1, 2000

Shasta McNasty (later retitled Shasta) is an American sitcom that aired on UPN from October 5, 1999, to August 1, 2000. The show was created by Jeff Eastin and produced by Eastin and Neal H. Moritz. The show starred Carmine Giovinazzo, Jake Busey, Dale Godboldo, and Jolie Jenkins.

Although Shasta McNasty premiered with less-than-favorable reviews from critics, the program was nominated for a People's Choice Award for best new comedy (and nearly won it in a live online vote before eventually losing to Stark Raving Mad). However, the series was cancelled after one season.

== Plotline ==
Scott, Dennis and Randy are part of the rap rock band Shasta McNasty. After signing to Da Funk Records, the three friends relocate from Chicago to Los Angeles where they find out that the label has become defunct. Keeping their advance money that they received, they rent an apartment in Venice Beach where they share a kitchen with their next-door neighbor Diana. The first half of the series focused on the band, their landlord, odd jobbing to earn rent money, and general mischief.

The second half of the series focused on the three friends working at a local bar for their friend Vern, while they hoped to sign with another record label again. Also Scott and Diana's relationship began to develop. The series was retooled mid-season, including a month-long break two months after the debut. Renamed Shasta, the series abandoned the hip-hop premise and removed narrative devices like breaking the fourth wall.

The series' concluding episode is set ten years later. It presents as an episode of Behind the Band 2010 (a parody of Behind the Music). It is revealed that Shasta McNasty did become a famous, highly successful band, but ego, addiction, in-fighting, and creative differences took their toll.

== Cast ==
=== Main ===
- Jake Busey as Dennis
- Carmine Giovinazzo as Scott
- Dale Godboldo as Randy
- Jolie Jenkins as Diana

=== Guest stars ===
- Verne Troyer as Verne Valentine
- Nicole Forester as Michelle/Karen
- Erik Estrada as Eduado, Himself, Police Chief
- Wajid as Farook
- Gary Busey as Jack
- April Mills as Ren
- Kristen Winnicki as Trina
- Peter Brost as Young Dennis
- Scott Caudill as Bully

== Episodes ==
Shasta McNasty episodes
No.	Title	Directed by	Written by	Original release date	Prod. code
1	"Pilot" "Brothers Out Land"	Dennis Dugan	Jeff Eastin	October 5, 1999	100
Via Scott talking to the Fourth Wall, we discover how the guys ended up in L.A. and discover that since they lost their record contract, they have spent a lot of time scoping out the babes. Scott catches Randy and Dennis spying on the girl in the apartment opposite. When they discover that her boyfriend is cheating on her, Scott asks the others to help him plant a pair of Diana's panties to ensure that she breaks up with him. With Dennis and Diana on the look out, Randy helps Scott get inside her apartment, where he ends up having a fight with her parrot, Buster. Guest stars: Mary Lynn Rajskub as Diana; Mark Daniel Cade, Lionel D. Carson, Cindy Margolis, Paul Wight
2	"Little Dude"	Dennis Dugan	Jeff Eastin	October 5, 1999	101
During dinner with Scott's girlfriend Karen, the boys get caught up in a brawl with Vern a 'little person' employed by the restaurant. When the boys discover that he has been fired, Scott tries to find him another job while Dennis, Randy and Vern spend the days goofing off. Elsewhere, Randy is offered the important job of arranging a fundraiser with special guest speaker Gary Coleman which ultimately results in heartbreak for one of the boys. Guest stars: Gary Coleman, Richard Kline, Heather Kozar
3	"Adult Education"	Dennis Dugan	George Doty IV	October 12, 1999	102
After discovering that the 'Squidmato' stand is closing down, Randy blends his own and gets Dennis to endorse it with the locals before appearing as a guest on Win Ben Stein's Money. Meanwhile, Diana who finds herself strangely attracted to Dennis' genius is eager to seek out the truth and Scott enrolls in night school only to develop a crush on his married teacher. Guest star: Ben Stein
4	"Chubby Chick"	Neal Israel	Caryn Lucas	October 19, 1999	103
Dennis thinks that his chubby girlfriend will dump him when she loses weight. Elsewhere, after not being able to watch the Notre Dame game in Captain Bob's or any other bar local to them, Randy convinces Scott to steal their neighbours cable so that they can watch the game. Unfortunately, their neighbor has a love of Spanish soap operas.
5	"The Return of Buster"	Craig Zisk	Jeff Eastin	November 2, 1999	107
Scott convinces Dennis and Randy to spend Halloween watching scary movies with him, but he soon finds himself in the middle of his very own mashup of popular horror flicks when he has a nightmare about Buster the Parrot. Guest star: Cindy Margolis
6	"Angels in Lingerie Are Devils in Disguise"	Savage Steve Holland	Dave Rygalski	November 9, 1999	108
With the help of Randy and Diana, Scott attempts to transform Tina, a clumsy waitress, into a sexy lingerie model. She has trouble finding a job when they realize that she looks exactly the same as Victoria's Secret model Suzanne Lanza. Dennis tries to help out, and lands himself a job in the process.
7	"Viva Las Vegas"	Neal Israel	Jeff Eastin	November 16, 1999	109
Dennis convinces Randy and Scott to come on his road trip to Las Vegas following the sequence of his free coupon book. The trip turns into a disaster when Scott's former high school girlfriend sics her new boyfriend, a hitman, onto the boys. Guest stars: Lisa Boyle, Diana Uribe
8	"The Thanksgiving Show"	Tim O'Donnell	Caryn Lucas & Richard Gurman	November 23, 1999	110
When the boys take a trip to the homeless shelter on Thanksgiving, Dennis is reunited with his deadbeat father, Jack. Jack moves in with the boys, but soon they are all sick of him, and try to get him and his stripper girlfriend back together, so he will move back out. Guest star: Gary Busey
9	"The Menace from Venice"	Dennis Dugan	Richard Gurman & Caryn Lucas	December 7, 1999	105
The boys decide to turn Vern into a professional boxer after he gets into a fight with another little person in a club, with disastrous results until Scott steps in to train him and things get a bit sticky when a local fight promoter wants in on his terms.
10	"Bed Worthy"	Alan Cohn	Bill Canterbury	January 18, 2000	111
Unable to pay his share of the rent, Dennis agrees to babysit the landlord's grandchildren – he entertains them with a story involving the boys, Diana, and a bed.
11	"Big Brother"	Savage Steve Holland	Richard Gurman	January 25, 2000	104
When the boys return from Tijuana, they learn that Eduardo, a bullfighter, has stowed away in their trunk in order to find his long-lost fiancée. Meanwhile, Dennis joins a big brother program, but his little brother soon begins copying his every move. Guest stars: Erik Estrada and Idalis DeLeón
12	"Leo Is a Pain in My..."	Neal Israel	Jeff Eastin	February 1, 2000	106
After a brief stint dressed as a cow, Dennis sells people looks at the Leonardo DiCaprio shaped rash it left on his behind in order to collect money to pay the rent. Elsewhere Scott tries his hand at working a skate shop before Mexican wrestling. Guest stars: Jaime Bergman, Michael Burger
13	"The Crush"	Alan Cohn	George Doty IV	February 8, 2000	113
The band brainstorms new ideas for names, when they discover they can not use the 'McNasty' in Shasta McNasty. Meanwhile, Diana tries to sabotage Scott's latest relationship after she reveals she has romantic feelings for him.
14	"The F Word"	Alan Cohn	Richard Gurman	February 15, 2000	114
Diana accidentally draws Scott's ex-girlfriend to him, when she attempts to find out more about his past. Meanwhile, Dennis encounters 'perfume withdrawal', as he searches to find his girlfriend the perfect gift for Valentine's Day and Randy tries to encourage Diana to talk to Scott about her feelings before he reaches out to his ex.
15	"True Size"	Dennis Dugan	Jeff Eastin	February 22, 2000	115
Verne enlists the help of Michelle and Diana when a scam leaves his bank account empty. Guest star: Jeff Ross
16	"The Shortest Yard"	Savage Steve Holland	Chris Brown	May 30, 2000	119
Verne bets his arch rival that his less than great Pee-Wee League football team will win a game. Meanwhile, Scott and Randy bribe a cheerleading team to appear, by telling them that an L.A. Lakers cheerleading scout will be in the crowd.
17	"Bachelorette Party"	Craig Zisk	Jim Keily & Jimmy Aleck	June 6, 2000	121
When Diana's boss makes her throw a bachelorette for his fiancée, she is convinced by the boys to have it at Captain Verne's Bar, with the boys doing the catering. The boys, however, have other plans as Verne installs a secret two-way mirror and begins charging people to watch the party. The bride-to-be convinces Dennis to bring out the kinky lingerie and the stripper, making it a night none of them will soon forget. Guest star: Erik Estrada
18	"The Sugar Pill"	Alan Cohn	Bill Canterbury	June 13, 2000	116
Shasta get the chance to perform for a record executive at Captain Verne's Bar, although the run up to it doesn't go smoothly when Dennis ingests a vast amount of psychotropic pills believing them to be sugar, Verne blackmails Scott into having a double date with his date's sister, Michelle and Diana's early arrival at the bar and Randy trying to deal with both of his friends problems.
19	"The Quiz"	Daniel Silverberg	Jim Keily & Jimmy Aleck	July 7, 2000	117
After another one of Dennis' ideas for theme nights at Verne's goes awry, they come up with an idea for "Underwear night" and trick Scott into being the poster boy. Meanwhile, Diana claims she's over Scott and thanks Randy for his help by hooking him up with one of her workmates who turns out to be perfect for him, until Dennis gets involved. Guest star: Brian Lawler
20	"Blue Flu"	Alan Cohn	Chris Brown	July 18, 2000	118
When Diana gets offered a job in New York, Scott is faced with a difficult decision regarding his feelings for her and his relationship with Michelle. Elsewhere, Dennis temporarily moves into Verne's crash pad while he awaits the arrival of the model he met while skiing and Randy tries to convince Verne that the speakers he's bought are not the right ones for the bar.
21	"Play Dead, Clown"	Neal Israel	Richard Gurman & Jeff Eastin	July 25, 2000	112
Scott's current girlfriend asks him to babysit her eight-year-old daughter, who, according to Diana can make or break their relationship. When Randy and Dennis have the bright idea of inviting the Jager girls up to the apartments for a party, Scott and Diana take it upon themselves to hire a clown for the little girl.
22	"Behind the Band: 2010"	Savage Steve Holland	Travis Romero	August 1, 2000	120
In this final episode, we get an insight into what happened to the band after the series ended. Set in 2010, the episode flash forwards to where the band are now and discusses their fame since being signed after the gig featured in "The Sugar Pill".

== Reception ==
A sneak preview of the series after UPN's highly rated WWF SmackDown! drew 4.52 million viewers. However, when the series was moved to its scheduled 8 p.m. timeslot, ratings dropped. Halfway through the first season, UPN shortened the show's title to Shasta, and the series was canceled after its first season.
