= Daniel Silverberg =

American film director

- Occupation(s): Film director, television director
- Years active: 1987–present

Daniel Silverberg is an American assistant director of film and television.

Silverberg has served as the first assistant director on numerous, notable films including, "Praise This" (2023), "Spirited" (2022), "Thunder Force" (2021),"Instant Family" (2018), "Life of the Party" (2018), "The Happytime Murders" (2018), Pitch Perfect 3 (2017), Pitch Perfect 2 (2015), Daddy's Home (2015), Just Go With It (2011), Hairspray (2007), Bedtime Stories (2008), Cheaper By The Dozen 2 (2005), The Pacifier (2005), Along Came Polly (2005) and Bringing Down the House (2003).

He has also worked as an assistant director on a variety of television series including, "Solos" (2021), "AJ and the Queen"(2020), "I Feel Bad" (2018), Glee., Grounded for Life, Andy Richter Controls the Universe and Numb3rs.

As a head director, he directed an episode of the UPN series Clueless and Shasta McNasty, both in 1999.
