= Someone Like Me (TV series) =

- Genre: Sitcom
- Created by: Bruce Helford
- Starring: Gaby Hoffmann; Patricia Heaton; Nikki Cox; Raegan Kotz; Matthew Thomas Carey; Joseph Tello; Anthony Tyler Quinn
- Composer: Jonathan Wolff
- Country of origin: United States
- Original language: English
- No. of seasons: 1
- No. of episodes: 6 (1 unaired)

Production
- Executive producers: Gail Berman; Sandy Gallin; Stuart Sheslow
- Producer: George Sunga
- Camera setup: Multi-camera
- Running time: 30 minutes
- Production companies: Sandollar Productions; Mohawk Productions; Touchstone Television

Original release
- Network: NBC
- Release: March 14 – April 25, 1994

Someone Like Me is an American sitcom television series created by Bruce Helford and produced by Sandollar Productions, Mohawk Productions and Touchstone Television. It aired on NBC from March 14 until April 25, 1994.

== Premise ==
The values of an 11-year-old clash with those of her baby boomer mom. Set in St. Louis, Gaby lives with her mother, who prepares natural food and keeps her home spotlessly clean, her stepfather who is an optician, her teenage sister and preschool-aged half-brother. Gaby is often at the recreation-center pool, where she loves to swim.

== Cast ==
=== Main ===
- Gaby Hoffmann as Gaby Stepjak
- Patricia Heaton as Jean Stepjak, Gaby's mother
- Nikki Cox as Samantha Stepjak, Gaby's older stepsister
- Raegan Kotz as Jane Schmidt, Gaby's best friend
- Matthew Thomas Carey as Neal Schmidt, Jane's younger brother
- Joseph Tello as Evan Stepjak, Gaby's younger half-brother
- Anthony Tyler Quinn as Steven Stepjak, Gaby's stepfather

=== Recurring ===
- Jane Morris as Dorie Schmidt, Jane & Neal's mother and Jean's best friend
- Krystin Moore as Marla

== Episodes ==
No.	Title	Directed by	Written by	Original release date	Viewers (millions)
1	"The Lying Game"	John Whitesell	Robert Cohen; Drew Carey	March 14, 1994	19.0
Gaby is punished for the first time when she lies to her stepfather.
2	"When Moms Collide"	Unknown	Unknown	March 28, 1994	16.2
Gaby throws a birthday party for Jane. Jeremy Torgerson guest stars.
3	"The Guy"	Unknown	Bruce Helford	April 4, 1994	17.4
Gaby has a crush on a guy who has a girlfriend.
4	"El Presidente"	John Whitesell; Zane Buzby	Mark Driscoll; Holly Hester	April 18, 1994	15.5
Gaby runs for class president and decides to take the ethical high road, despite the dirty tricks of her opponent. Ray Buktenica guest stars.
5	"What I Did for Art"	Rob Schiller	Eve Ahlert; Dennis Drake	April 25, 1994	15.5
Gaby tries to impress her art teacher (Leslie Nielsen) with performance art.
6	"Sympathy for the Devil"	N/A	N/A	Unaired	N/A
