= Valente Rodriguez =

American actor and comedian

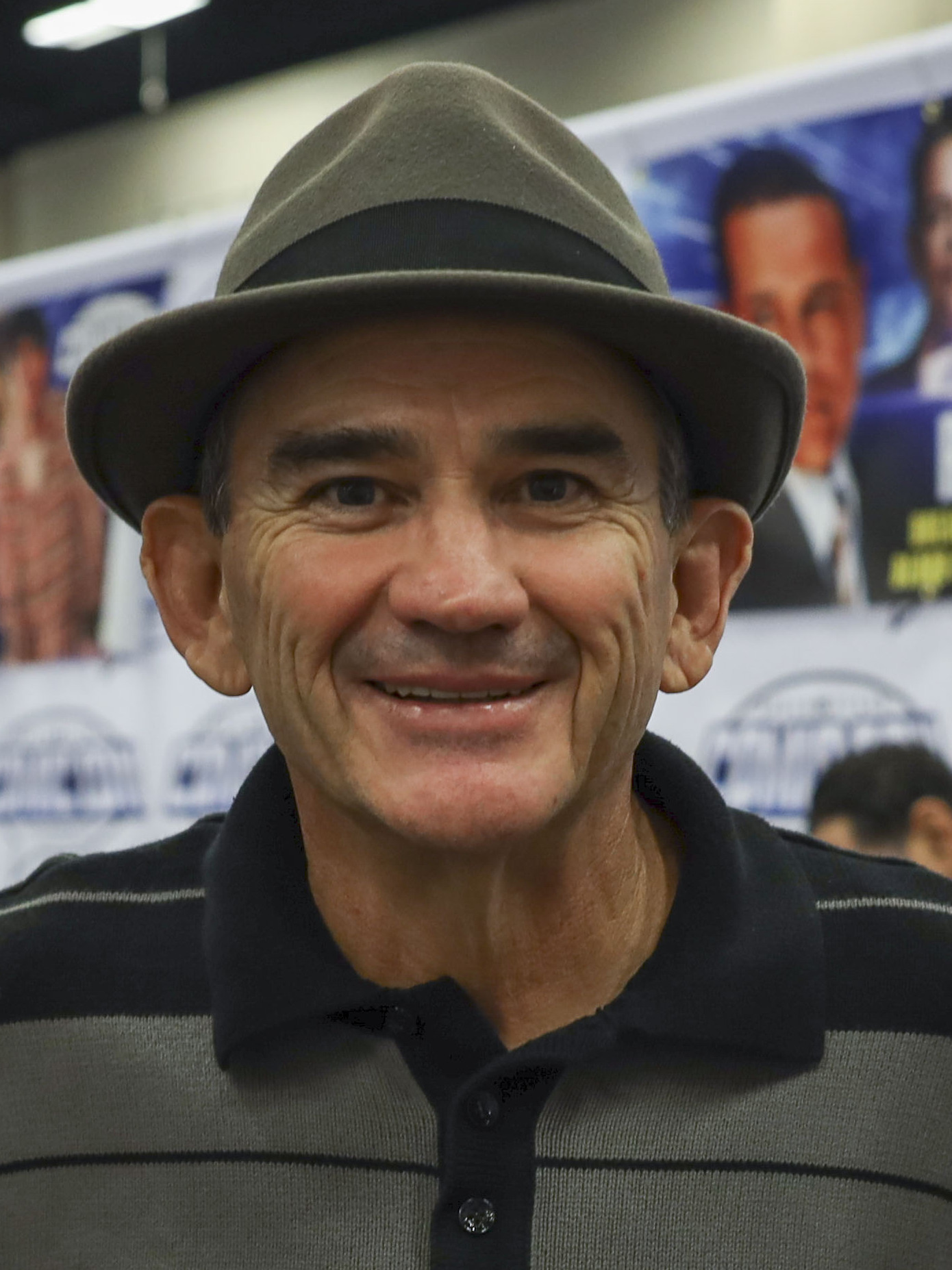
- Rodriguez in 2025
- Born: February 14, 1964 (age 62); Hidalgo County, Texas, U.S.
- Occupations: Actor, comedian
- Years active: 1988–present
- Known for: Role as Ernie Cardenas on the ABC series George Lopez

Valente Rodriguez (born February 14, 1964) is an American actor. He is best known for his role as Ernie Cardenas on the sitcom George Lopez. He also starred as Cesar in the TV Land sitcom Happily Divorced, as well as guest starring on Yes, Dear, Mad About You, and ER, and had film roles as Chuey in Salsa, Frankie in 1993's Blood In Blood Out and as Marco in Suckers (2001).

== Life and career ==
Rodriguez was born and raised in Hidalgo County, Texas, of Mexican descent. He attended the University of Texas-Pan American.

In 1988, Rodriguez moved to Los Angeles. He later landed his first leading role in the film Salsa. Other film credits include Impulse, Twenty Bucks, Ed, Volcano, Blood In Blood Out (Bound by Honor), Suckers, Erin Brockovich, Roosters, The Ugly Truth, The New Guy and the critically acclaimed Mi Familia or My Family.

He has also made television appearances as a regular on the Fox's comedy show Culture Clash, as well as Mad About You, The Golden Girls, Growing Pains, Falcon Crest, Beverly Hills, 90210, Dharma & Greg, Yes, Dear, Gotta Kick It Up!, Sabrina the Teenage Witch, and he also makes quick appearances in the films The House Bunny and (500) Days of Summer.

Rodriguez is most known for his role as Ernesto "Ernie" Cardenas on George Lopez as George's best friend and his co-worker throughout the series for 6 years and appeared in 120 episodes The show aired from 2002 until 2007.

== Filmography ==
=== Film ===
Year	Title	Role	Notes
1988	Salsa	Chuey	
1990	Impulse	Doorman	
1993	Twenty Bucks	Liquor Store Clerk	
1993	Blood In Blood Out	Frankie	
1993	Roosters	Adan	
1993	Mr. Jones	Orderly	
1994	Huck and the King of Hearts	Julio	
1995	My Family	Chucho's Friend	
1996	Ed	Jesus Rodriquez	
1996	Guy	Low Rider	
1996	The Big Squeeze	Father Arias	
1996	The Rich Man's Wife	Freeway Driver	
1997	Volcano	Train Driver	
1998	No Salida	Casper	
1999	Suckers	Marco	
1999	Deep Blue Sea	Helicopter Co-Pilot	
2000	Erin Brockovich	Donald	
2000	Picking Up the Pieces	Cuetero	
2001	The Gristle	Simone	
2002	The New Guy	Ramone	
2002	Never Trust a Serial Killer	Pinky	
2002	Gotta Kick It Up!	Mr. Reyna	TV movie
2008	The House Bunny	Valet	
2009	(500) Days of Summer	Employee #1	
2009	The Ugly Truth	Javier	
2009	It's Complicated	Reynaldo	
2009	The Red Queen	Jose Salinas	
2010	Lean Like a Cholo	Junior	
2010	Las Angeles	Peter	
2011	The Little Match Makers	Roberto	
2011	Gone Hollywood	Louie	
2015	McFarland, USA	Principal Camillo	
2015	Endgame	Coach Stevens	
2018	A Dog & Pony Show	Tug	
2018	Instant Family	Judge Rivas	
2019	Countdown	Father David	
2020	The Big Shot	Roger Billings	
2021	Welcome to Our World	Swapmeet	
2022	Father Stu	Bill's Foreman	
2022	A Latino Hollywood Nightmare	-	Short
2023	Proof Sheet	Guillermo Benavides	

=== Television ===
Year	Title	Role	Notes
1988	The Golden Girls	Fred	Episode: "Yokel Hero"
1988	Falcon Crest	Raoul	Episode: "Tuscany Venus"
1990	Max Monroe: Loose Cannon	Mechanic	Episode: "Freaks"
1990	Babes	-	Episode: "Temper, Temper"
1991	Ferris Bueller	Raoul	Episode: "A Night in the Life"
1993	Mad About You	Harold the Orderly	Episode: "Bedfellows"
1994	Beverly Hills, 90210	Mr. Pedroza	Episode: "Injustice for All"
1997	ER	Mr. Trajillo	Episode: "Something New"
1997	Total Security	Parking Valet	Episode: "Dental Men Prefer Blondes"
1997	Dharma & Greg	Roman	Episode: "The Ex-Files"
1999	The X Files	Walter Suarez	Episode: "Agua Mala"
2001	Sabrina, the Teenage Witch	Gustavo	Episode: "Sabrina, the Activist"
2001–02	Yes, Dear	Oscar	Episode: "Guarding Greg" & "Walk Like a Man"
2002–07	George Lopez	Ernesto "Ernie" Cardenas	Main Cast
2006	Freddie	Ernie	Episode: "Freddie Gets Cross Over George"
2009	The Bill Engvall Show	Jack	Episode: "Trash Talk"
2010	Miami Medical	Fortunato	Episode: "What Lies Beneath"
2011	Shameless	OSHA Officer	Episode: "Daddyz Girl"
2011	Wizards of Waverly Place	Muy Macho	Episode: "Magic Unmasked"
2011	The Mentalist	Frank Lopez	Episode: "Bloodsport" & "Scarlet Ribbons"
2011–13	Happily Divorced	Cesar	Main Cast
2013	The House on South Bronson	Valente	Episode: "Lost Member"
2014	See Dad Run	Bob	Episode: "See Dad Lose the Forest for the Treehouse"
2014	Cristela	Eddie	Episode: "It's Not About the Tamales"
2018	Murphy Brown	Carlos Gonzales	Episode: "Thanksgiving and Taking"
2019	Adam Ruins Everything	Tim	Episode: "Adam Ruins Games"
2019–23	High School Musical: The Musical: The Series	Principal Gutierrez	Recurring Cast: Seasons 1 & 4
2021	Dad Stop Embarrassing Me!	Manny	Recurring Cast
2022	The Garcias	Ghost of Hollywood's Past	Episode: "Never A Dull Moment"
2022	Lopez vs. Lopez	Val	Episode: "Lopez vs. Christmas"
