= Plump Fiction =

- Dutch DVD cover
- Directed by: Bob Koherr
- Written by: Bob Koherr
- Produced by: Gary Binkow
- Starring: Tommy Davidson; Julie Brown; Sandra Bernhard; Jennifer Rubin; Paul Dinello
- Narrated by: Don LaFontaine
- Cinematography: Rex Nicholson
- Edited by: Neil Kirk
- Music by: Michael Muhlfriedel
- Production company: Rhino Entertainment
- Distributed by: Legacy Releasing
- Release date: May 15, 1997
- Running time: 82 minutes
- Country: United States
- Language: English
- Box office: $71,145

Plump Fiction is a 1997 American parody film written and directed by Bob Koherr and produced by Rhino Entertainment. It is a spoof of mid-1990s films in general, and violent, convoluted films more specifically; the overall story is a send-up of 1994's Pulp Fiction, complete with intertitles and an out-of-sequence storyline, with other movies such as Reservoir Dogs and Natural Born Killers also parodied.

== Plot ==
At the start of the movie, Don LaFontaine's voice talks about how Quentin Tarantino started a trend of extremely violent movies, and says that the time has come for much more wholesome, life-affirming movies — and he is cut off as someone shoots him.

The body of the film contains the following intertwined plotlines:

- Jimmy Nova and Julius are two exterminators, required to dress as hitmen; they work for Montello, who also owns a strip club. Jimmy is assigned by Montello to look after his wife, Mimi, while he's out of town; her over-eating and wild behavior get herself and Jimmy into one mess after another, including being imprisoned by a convenience store owner and his pet "gimp" Nell. Jimmy and Mimi eventually drive off to Mexico together.
- Some of Montello's strippers concoct a plan to steal Montello's money; they disguise themselves as nuns and use fake names, including Sister Sister, Sister Sledge, and Sister Bertrille. The plan goes awry, and one of the nuns is wounded. As trust between the criminals breaks down, they all draw weapons on each other (including a blowtorch and a crossbow), but suddenly they're all gunned down by film director Crispin Maraschino, who's making a movie in the next room and doesn't want to be disturbed.
- Nicky and Vallory Cox, a pair of tag-team wrestlers called the Natural Blonde Killers, blame their lot on a terrible movie made about them by Gulliver Stone. They steal a seemingly valuable suitcase from Montello and go into hiding; while on the run, Nicky accidentally leaves the suitcase in a booth at The Independent Cafe, a theme restaurant whose theme is independent films. The two of them go back to retrieve it, and find themselves in a showdown with Julius (whom they'd encountered earlier). The contents of the suitcase turn out to be an old Welcome Back, Kotter lunch box and several orange glow sticks. The Coxes both wind up shot by Julius.
- Bunny Roberts has written a violent film that Crispin Maraschino is shooting, but he doesn't have a copy of the script; she sends her friend Bumpkin to deliver her last copy to Maraschino. As Bumpkin runs to the studio, he occasionally bumps into the other characters, each time dropping the script pages and having to pick them up again. When he finally gets to the studio, the script is a convoluted mess, and Maraschino loves it; the title is revealed to be Plump Fiction. Bunny, meanwhile, winds up dead in the showdown between Julius and the Coxes.

After the credits, a server at the Independent Cafe (who calls himself Priscilla, Queen of the Desserts) looks into the camera and says, "This has been one long, mixed-up, crazy, out-of-sequence kind of day!"

== Cast ==
- Pamela Adlon as Vallory Cox
- Philippe Bergeron as Jean-Claude Ennui
- Sandra Bernhard as Bunny Roberts
- Julie Brown as Mimi Hungry
- Colleen Camp as Viv
- Dan Castellaneta as Bumpkin
- Jennifer Coolidge as Sister Sister
- Robert Costanzo as Montello Hungry
- Tommy Davidson as Julius
- Lezlie Deane as Jodi / The Gimp
- Lea DeLaria as Mr. Purple
- Nada Despotovich as Sister Bertrille
- Paul Dinello as Jimmy Nova
- Matthew Glave as Nicky Cox
- Kent Gregory (uncredited) as Diner Patron
- Shawn Michael Howard as Lee
- Tim Kazurinsky as Priscilla, Queen of The Desserts
- Simbi Khali as Sister Sledge
- Bob Koherr as Grip
- Don LaFontaine as Voice-Over, At Start of Film
- Scott LaRose as Karaoke Customer
- Kevin Meaney as Les
- Stephen Nemith as Convenience Store Clerk #1
- Molly O'Leary as The Waitress
- Kane Picoy as Kris Walken Kringle
- Paul Provenza as Crispin Maraschino
- Riki Rachtman as Convenience Store Clerk #2
- Jennifer Rubin as Kandi Kane
- Donna W. Scott as Convenience Store Patron
- Al Septien as Cop
- Karla Tamburrelli as Sister Ruth
- Judy Tenuta as Rhonda
- Jimmie Walker as Stingy Customer

== Parodies ==
The following films, people, and TV shows are parodied or satirized in the film:

- The Adventures of Priscilla, Queen of the Desert
- Woody Allen
- Clerks
- The Crying Game
- Forrest Gump
- Spike Lee
- The Monkees
- Natural Born Killers

- Nell
- Pulp Fiction
- Reservoir Dogs
- Oliver Stone
- Quentin Tarantino
- Christopher Walken
- Waterworld
- Reality Bites

The film satirizes the use of well-known songs in Pulp Fiction and Reservoir Dogs; the theme is an electric-guitar instrumental of "Hava Nagila", Jimmy and Mimi dance at the Cafe to the tune of "Gitarzan", etc.

== Reception ==
Based on five reviews collected by Rotten Tomatoes, the film holds a 0% approval rating.

== Poster ==
The poster is a parody of the Pulp Fiction poster:

- In the Pulp poster, Mia has a lit cigarette in one hand and is resting the other on a pulp magazine; in the Plump poster, Mimi is holding a lollipop in one hand and resting the other on a copy of The Joy of Cooking.
- Whereas the Pulp poster says, "Winner of the Palme d'Or, Cannes Film Festival," the Plump poster says, "Winner of the Palm d'Hors d'oeuvre, Canned Food Festivals."

== Home media ==
Plump Fiction has been released on VHS videocassette and DVD.
