= Bob Koherr =

American TV director and director

- Born: Robert Kohrherr
- Occupations: Director, actor
- Years active: 1986–present
- Spouse: Walter Batt (m. 2008)
- Website: http://www.bobkoherr.com

Bob Koherr is an American TV director and film director known for directing episodes of Anger Management and various Disney Channel multi-cam comedies.

In 1997, Koherr made his directorial debut with the feature film Plump Fiction, a parody film of Quentin Tarantino's Pulp Fiction. Since 2000, he has directed episodes of Anger Management, The Drew Carey Show, Wanda at Large, Still Standing, Freddie, George Lopez, Hannah Montana, Wizards of Waverly Place, Good Luck Charlie, The Suite Life on Deck, Cristela, the pilot for A.N.T. Farm, the pilot for The Thundermans, the pilot and series finales for Jessie and its spin-off Bunk'd, as well as other series.

As an actor, Koherr has guest starred in number of television series namely, Cybill, Party of Five, Nash Bridges, The Pretender, Malcolm in the Middle, Close to Home, Weeds, Seven Days and the feature films Poor White Trash, Parting Glances, Firehouse Dog and Race to Witch Mountain. He also co-starred in the Comedy Central series Strip Mall opposite Julie Brown.

On September 23, 2008, he married Walter Batt, a Los Angeles–based entertainment attorney.

== Filmography ==
=== Films ===
Film
Year	Title	Role	Notes
1986	Parting Glances	Sam	(was credited as Bob Kohrherr)
1992	Romeo & Julia	Romeo	
1997	Plump Fiction	Grip	
1997	Perfect Target	Mason	(Straight to Video)
1998	The Outsider	Rath	(Science fiction TV movie)
1999	Eastside	Paramedic	
2000	Poor White Trash	Jim Bronco	
2001	Maniacts	Bull	
2005	Extreme Dating	Large Man	
2009	Race to Witch Mountain	Marty	

=== TV ===
Year	Title	Role	Notes
1993	Grace Under Fire	Bailiff	(TV Series), 1 episode: "Grace Under Oath"
1994	Dead at 21 (TV Series)	Cop #1	(TV Series), 1 episode: "Shock the Monkey"
1995	Space: Above and Beyond	Crazy Marine	(TV Series), 1 episode: "The Enemy"
1996	Cybill	Big Guy	(TV Series), 1 episode: "Sex, Drugs and Catholicism"
1997	Alright Already	Velmeer	(TV Series), 1 episode: "Again with the Pilot"
1997	Party of Five	Police Officer	(TV Series), 1 episode: "What a Drag"
1997	Pacific Blue	(Unnamed role)	(TV Series), 1 episode: "Rave On"
1997	Ned and Stacey	Host	(TV Series), 1 episode: "Fifteen A-Minutes"
1998	Five Houses	(Unnamed role)	(TV movie)
1998	DiResta	Spivak	(TV Series), 1 episode: "Heavy Medal"
1998	Inferno	Bwanna	(TV movie)
1998	Brooklyn South	Lloyd Rogers	(TV Series), 1 episode: "Doggonit"
1998	House Rules	Clint	(TV Series), 1 episode: "Sex and Violence"
1999	Nash Bridges	Steve Pope	(TV Series), 1 episode: "Pump Action"
2000	Seven Days	Rhino	(TV Series), 1 episode
2000	V.I.P.	Thelonius Brock	(TV Series), 1 episode: "Hard Val's Night"
2000	The Pretender	Wyatt Frost	(TV Series), 1 episode: "Cold Dick"
2000–01	Strip Mall	Blunt / Blank / Blair	(TV Series), 21 episodes
2001	Spy TV	Various roles	(TV Series), 1 episode: "Episode #1.4"
2004	NYPD Blue	Drew	(TV Series), 1 episode: "Great Balls of Ire"
2005	Malcolm in the Middle	Mike	(TV Series), 1 episode: "Malcolm's Car"
2006	The Time Tunnel	Wix	(TV movie)
2007	Weeds	Bear	(TV Series), 1 episode: "Doing the Backstroke"
2007	George Lopez	Carl	(TV Series), 1 episode: "George Gets Smoking Mad at Benny and Develops an Órale Fixation"
2007	Close to Home	R. Scott Gemmill	(TV Series), 1 episode: "Internet Bride"
2008	Raising the Bar	George	(TV Series), 1 episode: "Pilot"
2008	Cold Case	Carl Baxter	(TV Series), 1 episode: "Sabotage"
2009	Zeke and Luther	Rex	(TV Series), 1 episode: "Luther Leads"
2009	My Name Is Earl	Marcus	(TV Series), 1 episode: "Bullies"
2011	L.A. Noire	Little Boy	(Video Game voice role)

=== TV Director ===
Year	Title	Notes
2000	Strip Mall	(TV Series), 1 episode
2000–04	The Drew Carey Show	(TV Series), 22 episodes
2001	Nikki	(TV Series), 1 episode: "Gimme Shelter"
2003	Wanda at Large	(TV Series), 6 episodes
2004	It's All Relative	(TV Series), 2 episodes: "Our Sauce, It Is a Beauty" and "Who's Camping Now"
2004–05	Still Standing	(TV Series), 3 episodes: "Still Cooking", "Still Going First" and "Still Aging"
2004–05	Listen Up	(TV Series), 7 episodes
2005	Stacked	(TV Series), 1 episode: "Heavy Meddle"
2005–06	Freddie	(TV Series), 6 episodes
2005–07	George Lopez	(TV Series), 11 episodes
2006	Out of Practice	(TV Series), 1 episode: "Restaurant Row"
2006	According to Jim	(TV Series), 2 episodes: "Polite Jim" and "Belaboring the Point"
2006	Living with Fran	(TV Series), 2 episodes: "Going Crazy with Fran" and "Dreaming with Fran"
2009	True Jackson, VP	(TV Series), 2 episodes: "Keeping Tabs" and "The Wedding"
2009–10	Wizards of Waverly Place	(TV Series), 19 episodes
2009–11	Hannah Montana	(TV Series), 10 episodes
2010–11	The Suite Life on Deck	(TV Series), 6 episodes
2010–14	Good Luck Charlie	(TV Series), 52 episodes
2011–12	A.N.T. Farm	(TV Series), 8 episodes
2011–15	Jessie	(TV Series), 23 episodes
2012	Austin & Ally	(TV Series), 1 episode: "Austin & Jessie & Ally All Star New Year: Part 1"
2012	Happily Divorced	(TV Series), 2 episodes: "Swimmers and Losers" and "Newman vs. Newman"
2012–14	Anger Management	(TV Series), 55 episodes
2013	Dads	(TV Series), 1 episode: "My Dad's Hotter Than Your Dad"
2013	The Thundermans	(TV Series), 1 episode: "Adventures in Supersitting"
2013	Baby Daddy	(TV Series), 1 episode: "New Bonnie vs. Old Ben"
2014	Friends with Better Lives	(TV Series), 1 episode: "No More Mr. Nice Guy"
2014	Mystery Girls	(TV Series), 2 episodes: "High School Mystery" and "Death Rose"
2014	Saint George	(TV Series), 4 episodes
2015	I Didn't Do It	(TV Series), 6 episodes
2015	Cristela	(TV Series), 1 episode: "Village Mode"
2015–24	Bunk'd	(TV Series), 33 episodes
2016	Best Friends Whenever	(TV Series), 3 episodes: "Princess Problems", "Worst Night Whenever" and "Girl Code"
2017	Raven's Home	(TV Series), 3 episodes: "Vending the Rules", "In-vision of Privacy" and "The Baxtercism of Levi Grayson"
2017–18	Bizaardvark	(TV Series), 3 episodes: "First Day of School", "The Doctor Will See You Now" and "Her, Me, and Hermie"
2018	Art House	(TV Series), 1 episode: "Pilot"
2018–19	The Conners	(TV Series), 4 episodes
2019	Team Kaylie	(TV Series), 5 episodes
2019	No Good Nick	(TV Series), 4 episodes
2020	Mr. Iglesias	(TV Series), 1 episode: "Taming the Carlos"
2020	The Big Show Show	(TV Series), 2 episodes: "The Big Brain" and "The Big Process"
2023	Lopez vs Lopez	(TV Series), 2 episodes: "Lopez vs Ghosts" and "Lopez Vs Van Bryan"
2024–25	Wizards Beyond Waverly Place	(TV series), 2 episodes: "Something Wizard This Way Comes" and "Quest Birthday Ever!"
