= Freddie (TV series) =

Television program

- Genre: Sitcom
- Created by: Conrad Jackson; Freddie Prinze Jr.; Bruce Rasmussen; Bruce Helford
- Starring: Freddie Prinze Jr.; Jacqueline Obradors; Brian Austin Green; Jenny Gago; Chloe Suazo; Mädchen Amick
- Theme music composer: Keb' Mo'
- Opening theme: "I'm a Man" by Lazy Lester
- Composer: Keb' Mo'
- Country of origin: United States
- Original language: English
- No. of seasons: 1
- No. of episodes: 21 + unaired pilot

Production
- Executive producers: Freddie Prinze, Jr.; Bruce Rasmussen; Deborah Oppenheimer; Bruce Helford; John Pasquin
- Producer: Conrad Jackson
- Running time: 30 minutes
- Production companies: Hunga Rican; Excitable Boy! Mohawk Productions; Warner Bros. Television

Original release
- Network: ABC
- Release: October 12, 2005 – May 31, 2006

Freddie is an American television sitcom created by Conrad Jackson, Freddie Prinze Jr., Bruce Rasmussen and Bruce Helford. The series first premiered on ABC on October 12, 2005, and was quickly canceled on May 31, 2006. Freddie is inspired by Prinze Jr.'s real life, growing up in a house filled with women. His lifelong friend, Conrad Jackson, co-created this series with Prinze, along with executive producers Bruce Helford and Bruce Rasmussen.

== Cast ==
- Freddie Prinze Jr. as Freddie Moreno
- Jacqueline Obradors as Sofia Moreno
- Brian Austin Green as Chris
- Jenny Gago as Grandma
- Chloe Suazo as Zoey Moreno
- Mädchen Amick as Allison

=== Crossover ===
Freddie Prinze Jr., Brian Austin Green, and Chloe Bridges reprised their characters on the American sitcom George Lopez (season 5, episode: "George Gets Cross Over Freddie"). Chloe Bridges is credited as Chloe Suazo.

== Production ==
Freddie was co-produced by Hunga Rican and Excitable Boy! in association with and Mohawk Productions and Warner Bros. Television. The friendship between Freddie and Chris in the show was loosely based on Jackson and Freddie's real-life friendship. It was reported by Variety on May 12, 2006, that ABC had decided not to renew the series, which was confirmed on May 15, 2006. The show aired in reruns on Sí TV in the United States and on Trouble in the United Kingdom until the channels closed.

== Reception ==
=== Critical ===
The show received largely negative reviews from television critics. The review aggregator website Rotten Tomatoes reported a 6% approval rating, based on 17 reviews, with an average rating of 4.0/10. The website's consensus reads, "Charmless and sophomoric, Freddie saddles the likable Prinze Jr. with an unpleasant persona while giving its ensemble of actresses little to do." Another review aggregator Metacritic awarded the show 33 out of 100 based on 24 critics, indicating "generally unfavorable reviews".

Tim Goodman of the San Francisco Chronicle called the show "stupid" and "annoying," along with fellow ABC sitcom Hot Properties.

=== Ratings ===
Season		Timeslot	U.S. ratings	Network	Rank
1	2005–2006	Wednesday	6.8 million	ABC	#89

== Episodes ==
No.	Title	Directed by	Written by	Original release date	U.S. viewers (millions)
Pilot	"Pilot"	John Pasquin	Freddie Prinze Jr., Conrad Jackson, Bruce Rasmussen & Bruce Helford	May 31, 2006	3.74
Freddie makes a date with a hostess from his restaurant on the same night he has agreed to watch Zoey. Luckily, Chris steps in to babysit, but when Sofia returns early, Freddie is busted. Meanwhile, Freddie's wild sister-in-law, Allison, is having a breakdown after the death of Freddie's brother, Joe, so he reluctantly invites her to come live with the family until she gets herself together. Note: This episode was originally scheduled to air on October 5, 2005, but ABC didn't air it until May 31, 2006.
1	"Rich Man, Poor Girl"	John Pasquin	Lori Kirkland	October 12, 2005	9.38
In the premiere episode, Freddie and Chris are taking a new approach to meeting women. After a series of unsuccessful dates with spoiled rich girls, the two decide to find "down to earth" women at a laundromat in their old neighborhood. Freddie runs into Gina, a nice girl from high school, and Chris meets Krystal, a girl easily impressed by his money. But when Freddie dates the woman he and his family think could be a perfect match for him, he ends up learning more about himself than he bargained for.
2	"Food Critic"	John Pasquin	Steven Molaro	October 19, 2005	8.09
Freddie is excited to learn that a top food critic will be reviewing the restaurant, but he becomes stressed out when he learns that the critic is a guy he beat up in high school. Sofia is even more worried because she does not want Freddie to find out the truth about what really happened between her and the boy. Allison gives 13-year-old Zoey a makeover.
3	"Halloween"	John Pasquin	Conrad Jackson	October 26, 2005	8.18
Freddie tries to be the "cool" uncle by taking Zoey to see The Rocky Horror Picture Show. But when Zoey tries to impress her friends by inviting them along, and his best buddy, Chris, dresses up as Dr. Frank-N-Furter, Freddie ends up with more than he bargained for. Meanwhile, Allison and Grandma are stuck at home handing out candy, so they entertain themselves with a drinking game.
4	"After Hours"	John Pasquin	Paul Ciancarelli & David DiPietro	November 2, 2005	6.96
Freddie and Chris have turned the restaurant into an after-hours nightclub, and while Zoey is away on a school trip, Sofia decides to go out and have some fun. But the fun turns into a one-night stand for Sofia, so Freddie has to teach her the "rules of engagement" after her 14-year absence from the dating scene.
5	"The War of the Rose"	John Pasquin	Tom Hertz	November 9, 2005	8.35
Freddie finds himself attracted to the beautiful woman who has opened a bakery down the street—and who is putting a serious dent into his dessert business. There is only one problem: Chris asks her out first, and seems to be really falling for her. Meanwhile, Allison decides to send her resume around to drum up job offers, with sorry results.
6	"The Italian Job"	Bob Koherr	Lori Kirkland	November 16, 2005	8.58
Freddie tries to date Rose (guest star Tamara Braun), a girl who recently broke up with Chris. But when Chris finds out that Rose wants to get back together with her ex-boyfriend, he seeks fun revenge on Freddie by setting up an embarrassing evening for him—which includes cooking and serving the lovey-dovey couple a romantic dinner. And later, Chris and Freddie work together to try to break the couple up.
7	"The Courtship of Freddie's Father"	John Pasquin	Dailyn Rodriguez	November 30, 2005	8.05
Freddie and Sofia's father, whom they have not seen in 24 years, comes to visit from Puerto Rico for Grandma's birthday. Though they are reluctant to let him back into their lives, Carlos (guest star Esai Morales) charms the family and wants Freddie to consider letting him move to Chicago permanently.
8	"Dollars and No Sense"	Bob Koherr	Andy Berman	December 7, 2005	8.13
Freddie decides to override Sofia's judgement by buying Zoey an expensive phone that she wants. When they are caught, Freddie and Chris are supposed to take Zoey to a soup kitchen to teach her a lesson, but instead decide to take her to an auction that they had been planning on going to. The real lesson is learned when Zoey makes Freddie bid a ridiculous amount of money on an item she wants, and Freddie makes her work it off at the restaurant, finally teaching her the value of a dollar.
9	"I'll Be Homeless for Christmas"	Bob Koherr	Kristen Marvin Hughes	December 14, 2005	7.48
'Tis the season for a Christmas party, so Freddie invites his neighbors in the complex to celebrate with his family and friends. But when a jealous neighbor reports to the board that Freddie is breaking the rules by having too many people living in his condo, Freddie has to get a petition signed by the majority of the tenants allowing them to stay. However, when Freddie goes door to door, he realizes his neighbors share no good will towards his family, who has not been very conscientious—but can he win them over now?
10	"Freddie the Himbo"	Ken Whittingham	Tom Hertz	January 25, 2006	6.05
Sofia tries to kiss up to her med school's Dean by suggesting that Freddie's restaurant be the location for a fundraiser, which leads to Freddie and the beautiful Dean having a fling. Meanwhile, Chris has a good idea for once.
11	"The Mixer"	Katy Garretson	Steven Molaro	February 1, 2006	7.42
Freddie feels a lot of pressure from Grandma to settle down, so he begrudgingly agrees to have a Catholic singles mixer at the restaurant to please her. There he is happily surprised to meet Denise, a beautiful young woman that Grandma handpicked for him. The only problem is, Denise is a virgin and is waiting to meet the right man, but is Freddie the one?
12	"Eligible Bachelor"	Katy Garretson	Conrad Jackson	February 8, 2006	5.96
Freddie and Chris are both nominated as finalists for the title of "Chicago's Most Eligible Bachelor". They invite the other nominees to the restaurant for an informal get-together and team up to scope out the competition. But, when they realize that only one man will be featured on the cover of a magazine, they become highly competitive and try to outdo one another to win.
13	"The Two That Got Away" (Part 1)	Katy Garretson	Dailyn Rodriguez	February 15, 2006	5.82
Freddie feels like he made a mistake when he stopped seeing Denise the first time, so he agrees to drive Grandma to church, hoping to run into her for a second chance. When Denise tells him that she is seeing someone else, Freddie realizes he is going to have to work to win her back. Meanwhile Rose is back in town, and when Chris reveals Freddie's true feelings for her, she feels the same. Now Freddie is torn between two wonderful women—but which one will he choose?
14	"Two Times a Lady" (Part 2)	Gerry Cohen	Lori Kirkland	February 22, 2006	5.05
Freddie is torn between two women he finds irresistible and just cannot choose one, try though he might. Chris suggests dating each girl to find out who is right for him. Freddie is excited about Rose, who is fun and impulsive like him, but he is also charmed by Denise's caring heart and sensitivity. However, when these women learn that he is dating both of them, will either want to stay?
15	"Recipe for Disaster"	Katy Garretson	Paul Ciancarelli & David DiPietro	March 1, 2006	5.08
Freddie has a lovely dream that The Pussycat Dolls are in his bedroom, but is sadly awakened by Grandma's nagging. Freddie helps Chris interview potential chefs for his new restaurant, and they meet the eccentric Martin (guest star George Takei) and easygoing, inexperienced Spyder (guest star Kiko Ellsworth)—whom Chris hires on the spot, over Freddie's objections. Chris has some wild ideas for his new restaurant that Freddie tells him won't work. But when Chris gets upset, Freddie realizes he has to be a supportive friend, so he buries his objections to help Chris create a restaurant that is truly his own.
16	"The Search for Grandpa Four"	Gerry Cohen	Tony Gama-Lobo & Rebecca May	March 8, 2006	5.30
Freddie and the gang feel that something is bothering Grandma and assume it is because all of her friends have found mates. So Freddie and Chris decide to help her find a man's man, while Sofia and Allison search for their version of the perfect man for Grandma. They try to fix her up with someone but are surprised to find she may not need their help at all.
17	"To Have Loved Way Too Much and Lost"	Bob Koherr	Conrad Jackson	March 15, 2006	5.29
Chris tells Freddie and Denise that the woman he has been dating dropped him when she learned how many women he had been with, and Freddie becomes alarmed that now Denise will want to know how many Freddie has been with too, so Chris recommends that Freddie lie about his real number to Denise. Meanwhile, Freddie may have a bigger problem on his hands when Denise reveals that her boss wants her to relocate to Hawaii for work, and a discussion with Freddie about his life experiences makes her rethink how much she has lived herself. Will she leave Freddie for a new job in Hawaii, or will she stay with the man she loves?
18	"Freddie Gets Cross Over George"	Bob Koherr	Stacey Pulwer	March 22, 2006	7.70
After Freddie and Chris' trip to Los Angeles to investigate whether or not Zoey's internet friend is genuine or a predator, they realize that George's son, Max, really is a kid and invite them to Chicago so that Max and Zoey can finally meet face to face. When George sees how well off Freddie is, he teases him that he is "soft", so Freddie takes him to a rowdy bar in his old neighborhood to prove he hasn't lost his edge. But when they get involved in a bar fight and end up in jail, Freddie and George realize that they've both lost their edge and don't mind being a little "soft". Special guest stars: George Lopez, Valente Rodriguez as Ernie, Luis Armand Garcia as Max Lopez Note: This episode is a crossover between Freddie and George Lopez.
19	"Freddie and the Hot Mom"	Bob Koherr	Andy Berman & Kristen Marvin Hughes	March 29, 2006	6.43
Freddie and Chris return home from a night out and walk in on his niece Zoey's slumber party. Chris jumps in and helps one of her 13-year-old friends with her boyfriend crisis, while Freddie meets Kaitlyn (guest star Krista Allen), the mother of another girl, and they hit it off right away. But when Freddie tries to date Kaitlyn, he learns he has to win over her daughter first, which makes Zoey jealous.
20	"Open and Shut"	Gerry Cohen	Andy Berman & Kristen Marvin Hughes	April 5, 2006	5.80
Chris' new restaurant is about to open, and he wants to make all the decisions himself. He refuses to let Freddie see it in advance—which drives his friend crazy. Freddie, Sophia and Allison sneak in one night and discover a rather chic and technologically advanced restaurant. Freddie's concerns are eased until he gets a panicky call from Chris when his chef quits at the last minute. Chris relents and asks his friend to cook for opening night—but can Freddie help Chris' restaurant become a success, or will everything fall apart and even put Freddie's own restaurant in jeopardy?
21	"Mother of All Grandfathers"	Gerry Cohen	Tom Hertz	April 12, 2006	5.84
After finding out that Chris used his share of Freddie's restaurant as collateral for his own failed restaurant venture, Freddie insists that Chris ask his wealthy grandfather, Carl (guest star Burt Reynolds), for money to pay off the debt. Carl is displeased with Chris' slacker lifestyle and impressed with Freddie's work ethic, so he makes Chris work as his chauffeur to teach him a lesson about money and responsibility. When Chris feels humiliated, he pushes back, and the result is that grandfather pays off the loan but takes Chris' trust fund and condo in return. So Chris ends up homeless at Freddie's already crowded apartment.
