= Frankie Quiñones =

American stand-up comedian

- Occupations: Stand-up comedian and actor
- Known for: CholoFit, This Fool

Frankie Quiñones is an American stand-up comedian and actor from Los Angeles, California. He is best known for his role as Creeper in the sketch comedy web series CholoFit and his lead role in Hulu's This Fool. He is the voice of Maria Teresa on the Cartoon Network series Victor and Valentino.

== Early life ==
Quiñones was inspired by comedy shows such as In Living Color, Culture Clash, and Saturday Night Live as a child. He graduated from Saint Bonaventure High School in Ventura, California.

== Career ==
Quiñones gained some recognition for his web series Juanita Carmelita, centering a character he based on his mother's personality. His character Creeper, based on his father's cholo style and attitude, went viral with his CholoFit sketch, appearing in numerous popular videos. With the popularity of the web series, Quiñones started doing more stand-up routines at major venues, including The Wiltern and Fox Theater.

In 2021, he hosted the HBO Max comedy sketch show Frankie Quiñones: Superhomies and launched his podcast The Frankie Quiñones Show. In 2022, he was cast in a supporting role on the Hulu series This Fool. His performance on the show received positive reviews. His performance was nominated for the Independent Spirit Award for Best Supporting Performance in a New Scripted Series.

Quiñones' first hour-long stand-up comedy special Damn That’s Crazy premiered on Hulu on October 10, 2025.
