= This Fool =

American comedy television series

- Genre: Comedy
- Created by: Chris Estrada; Pat Bishop; Matt Ingebretson; Jake Weisman
- Directed by: Pat Bishop; Matt Ingebretson; Diego Velasco
- Starring: Chris Estrada; Frankie Quiñones; Michael Imperioli; Michelle Ortiz; Laura Patalano; Julia Vera; Fabian Alomar; Sandra Hernandez
- Country of origin: United States
- Original language: English
- No. of seasons: 2
- No. of episodes: 20

Production
- Executive producers: Fred Armisen; Pat Bishop; Chris Estrada; Jonathan Groff; Matt Ingebretson; Jake Weisman
- Producer: Tina Densmore Bell
- Cinematography: Christophe Lanzenberg
- Editors: Daniel Haworth; Daniel Johnson; Edwin Rivera
- Running time: 24 minutes
- Production companies: Tutu, Get in the Car; Incredible Success; Red Pulley Productions; Antigravico; ABC Signature

Original release
- Network: Hulu
- Release: August 12, 2022 – July 28, 2023

This Fool is an American comedy television series created by Chris Estrada, Pat Bishop, Matt Ingebretson, and Jake Weisman, and starring Estrada and Frankie Quiñones. It premiered on Hulu on August 12, 2022, and concluded on July 28, 2023. The show includes a comedic look at cholo culture and lifestyle.

In November 2022, the series was renewed for a second season. In February 2024, the series was canceled after two seasons.

== Synopsis ==
Julio Lopez is 30 and still living with his mother and grandmother in his childhood bedroom. He works at Hugs Not Thugs, a gang rehabilitation center in Los Angeles that helps recently incarcerated people readjust to life outside of prison. His older cousin Luis is a former gang member who was recently released from prison after an eight-year stint, and is now in the Hugs Not Thugs program.

== Cast ==
- Chris Estrada as Julio Lopez
- Frankie Quiñones as Luis
- Michael Imperioli as Minister Payne
- Michelle Ortiz as Maggie
- Laura Patalano as Esperanza
- Julia Vera as María
- Sandra Marcela Hernandez as Ana
- Anna LaMadrid as Rocio
- Fabian Alomar as Fabián

In the episode "Los Botes", Matt Ingebretson and Jake Weisman reprise their respective roles as Matt Engelbertson and Jake Levinson from the Comedy Central series Corporate (2018–2020) in guest roles. In the episode "Y Tu Julio También", Adam Lustick from Corporate had a cameo as Julio's dentist.

== Episodes ==
=== Series overview ===
Season	Episodes	Originally released
1	10	August 12, 2022
2	10	July 28, 2023

=== Season 1 (2022) ===
This Fool episodes
No. overall	No. in season	Title	Directed by	Written by	Original release date
1	1	"A Storm is Coming"	Pat Bishop	Chris Estrada, Jake Weisman, Matt Ingebretson & Pat Bishop	August 12, 2022
2	2	"Putazos"	Pat Bishop	Curtis Cook	August 12, 2022
3	3	"Emotional Timothy"	Matt Ingebretson	Eliza Jiménez Cossio	August 12, 2022
4	4	"Y Tu Julio También"	Pat Bishop	Caroline Anderson & Jake Weisman	August 12, 2022
5	5	"Sandy Says"	Diego Velasco	Pat Bishop & Johan Miranda	August 12, 2022
6	6	"Los Botes"	Diego Velasco	Monica Padrick	August 12, 2022
7	7	"Sh*t or Get Off the Pot"	Pat Bishop	Tamara Yajia	August 12, 2022
8	8	"The Devil Made Me Do It"	Pat Bishop	Jonathan Cerda-Rowell	August 12, 2022
9	9	"F*ck the Rich"	Matt Ingebretson	Matt Ingebretson	August 12, 2022
10	10	"A Fresh Start"	Matt Ingebretson	Chris Estrada	August 12, 2022

=== Season 2 (2023) ===
No. overall	No. in season	Title	Directed by	Written by	Original release date
11	1	"The Rooster"	Pat Bishop	Chris Estrada	July 28, 2023
12	2	"Clyde & Clyde, Pt 1"	Pat Bishop	Pat Bishop	July 28, 2023
13	3	"Clyde & Clyde, Pt 2"	Pat Bishop	Johan Miranda	July 28, 2023
14	4	"Feel the Payne"	Pat Bishop	Curtis Cook	July 28, 2023
15	5	"Cut the Shit"	Pat Bishop	Tamara Yajia	July 28, 2023
16	6	"Los Personas Invisables"	Pat Bishop	Jonathan Cerda-Rowell	July 28, 2023
17	7	"The Big Deal"	Matt Ingebretson	Eliza Jimenez Cossio	July 28, 2023
18	8	"The Bigger Man"	Matt Ingebretson	Marcelo Chow & Jesus Trejo	July 28, 2023
19	9	"Y Tu Depression Tambien"	Matt Ingebretson	Jake Weisman	July 28, 2023
20	10	"Two Fuckin' Losers"	Matt Ingebretson	Vince Caldera & Matt Ingebretson	July 28, 2023

== Production ==
The series was created by Chris Estrada with producers Pat Bishop, Matt Ingebretson, and Jake Weisman. Bishop, Ingebretson and Weisman, who at the time were producing the Comedy Central series Corporate, approached Estrada about creating a show in 2018. Fred Armisen is an executive producer. On November 10, 2022, Hulu renewed the series for a second season. On February 14, 2024, Hulu canceled the series after two seasons.

== Release ==
This Fool premiered on Hulu in the United States on August 12, 2022, and concluded on July 28, 2023.

== Reception ==
=== Critical response ===
The review aggregator website Rotten Tomatoes reported a 100% approval rating with an average rating of 7.40/10, based on 13 critic reviews. The website's critics consensus reads, "There's no reason to pity This Fool, which resoundingly succeeds as an unsentimental comedy about community and family… and what a pain in the neck they can be." Metacritic, which uses a weighted average, assigned a score of 76 out of 100 based on 5 critics, indicating "generally favorable reviews".

Sean L. McCarthy of Decider stated, "This is a winning portrait of two guys in South Central L.A. with opposing life philosophies who find they each have something to learn from the other. You like winners, don't you? Then come along for the ride, since Maggie already has taken the car." Yael Tygiel of Collider included the show in their "Best Shows on Hulu Right Now" list, writing, "While heavily leaning into Latino culture and inspired directly by Estrada's personal life, This Fool is an uplifting series with scenes and experiences relatable for many immigrant families, regardless of origin. Exploring themes of family, codependency, and class, This Fool is an unexpectedly cinematic comedy allowing stars like Laura Patalano and even recurring actors like Michael Imperioli (The White Lotus) to present their truths."

Inkoo Kang of The New Yorker included This Fool in their "Best TV Shows of 2022" list. Alan Sepinwall of Rolling Stone included "Y Tu Julio También" in their "25 Best TV Episodes of 2022" list, writing, "Like a lot of first-year comedies, This Fool — starring comedian Chris Estrada as Julio, who works at a nonprofit helping former gang members go straight — had its ups and downs as it figured out exactly what was funny about its premise and its characters. But when it hit, it really hit, like this installment about Julio's pathological hatred of his own birthday. We see the day largely from his perspective, where every attempt to celebrate another trip around the sun feels to him like he's trapped in a horror movie. A simple idea, very amusingly presented."

=== Accolades ===
Frankie Quiñones was nominated for Best Supporting Performance in a New Scripted Series by the Independent Spirit Awards.
