= Bless This House (American TV series) =

US sitcom

- Genre: Sitcom
- Created by: Bruce Helford
- Starring: Andrew Clay; Cathy Moriarty; Raegan Kotz; Sam Gifaldi
- Composer: Ed Alton
- Country of origin: United States
- Original language: English
- No. of seasons: 1
- No. of episodes: 16

Production
- Camera setup: Multi-camera
- Running time: 30 minutes
- Production companies: Mohawk Productions; Warner Bros. Television

Original release
- Network: CBS
- Release: September 11, 1995 – January 17, 1996

Bless This House is an American sitcom television series created by Bruce Helford, which starred Andrew Clay and Cathy Moriarty that aired on CBS from September 11, 1995, until January 17, 1996.

== Plot ==
Postal worker Burt Clayton and his wife Alice raise two children—daughter Danny and son Sean—in Trenton, New Jersey.

== Cast ==
- Andrew Clay as Burt Clayton
- Cathy Moriarty as Alice Clayton, Burt's wife
- Raegan Kotz as Danielle "Danny" Clayton
- Sam Gifaldi as Sean Clayton
- Molly Price as Phyllis
- Don Stark as Lenny

== Episodes ==
No.	Title	Directed by	Written by	Original release date	Prod. code	Viewers (millions)
1	"Pilot"	Barnet Kellman	Bruce Helford	September 11, 1995	475098	15.4
2	"A Woman's Work Is Never Done"	Barnet Kellman	Bruce Helford	September 13, 1995	457551	10.3
3	"Company Loves Misery"	Barnet Kellman	Diane Burroughs & Joey Gutierrez	September 20, 1995	457552	11.2
4	"A Date Which Will Live in Infamy"	Unknown	Unknown	September 27, 1995	457553	9.0
5	"I Am Not My Sister's Keeper"	Unknown	Unknown	October 11, 1995	457555	13.6
6	"Where There's Smoke, You're Fired"	Unknown	Unknown	October 18, 1995	457554	11.5
7	"The Road to Hell Is Paved With Good Intentions"	Unknown	Unknown	October 25, 1995	457556	10.7
8	"A Fight a Day Keeps the Doctor Away"	Unknown	Unknown	November 1, 1995	457557	10.5
9	"Fish and Guests Stink After Three Days"	Unknown	Unknown	November 8, 1995	457558	9.8
10	"The Postman Always Moves Twice"	Unknown	Unknown	November 15, 1995	457559	12.5
11	"Neither a Borrower Nor a Landlord Be"	Unknown	Unknown	November 22, 1995	457560	8.4
12	"If It Ain't Broke, Break It"	Pamela Fryman	Lona Williams	December 13, 1995	457561	9.5
13	"Misery on 34th Street"	Unknown	Unknown	December 20, 1995	457562	11.4
14	"The Bowling Method"	Unknown	Unknown	January 3, 1996	457563	11.6
15	"One Man's Ceiling Is Another Man's Stereo"	Unknown	Unknown	January 10, 1996	457565	11.7
16	"Natural Born Parents"	Shelley Jensen	Diane Burroughs & Joey Gutierrez	January 17, 1996	457566	11.5

== Reception ==
The Rochester Democrat and Chronicle gave the show a favorable review, saying, "it really does remind you of Jackie Gleason and The Honeymooners, without trying to copy that classic. There could be life after Dice; this kinder, gentler Andrew Clay seems like a pretty decent guy." The Los Angeles Times also gave it favorable notice, writing, "Bless This House doesn't quite blow you away, but it's a pleasant half-hour with likable characters and enough start-up humor to make you optimistic about its future."

Other reviews were mixed. Entertainment Weekly gave the show a C, writing, "Bless has smart things to say about how hardworking parents manage family life, but the show is hobbled by its endless succession of squalid sex jokes." TV Guide ranked Bless This House number 48 on their 50 Worst Shows of All Time list in 2002. People gave the show a C+, praising the performances of Clay and Moriarty, but concluding "Bless This House is the first TV show I’ve ever seen that would work better on radio." Variety wrote, "Director Barnet Kellman bounces laugh lines along at a brisk clip [...] Creator Bruce Helford’s writing is often ham-handed [...] Clay’s acting is awkward and forced, but Moriarty’s a treasure [...] Though Bless looks to be trying to carbon The Honeymooners, its closest relative would seem to be Married... with Children."
