= Whose Daughter Is She? =

- Directed by: Frank Arnold
- Written by: Cindy Myers
- Produced by: Philip K. Kleinbart
- Starring: Joanna Kerns; Stephanie Zimbalist; Gaby Hoffmann; Michael Shulman
- Cinematography: Isidore Mankofsky
- Edited by: David Codron
- Music by: John Frizzell
- Release date: September 24, 1995
- Running time: 89 minutes
- Country: United States
- Language: English

Whose Daughter Is She? is a CBS original television film directed by Frank Arnold. It premiered on September 24, 1995 in the United States on CBS. The film stars Stephanie Zimbalist, Gaby Hoffmann, Joanna Kerns, Lisa Wilhoit, Michael Shulman and others. It is also known as Semi-Precious, Moms and For the Love of My Daughter.

== Premise ==
Two mothers, one biological (Zimbalist), one step-mom (Kerns), fight for the custody and love of 13-year-old Andrea (Hoffmann).
