= Bruce Helford =

American television writer and producer (born 1952)

- Born: Bruce Lewis Helford; January 28, 1952 (age 74); Chicago, Illinois, U.S.
- Occupations: Writer, television producer
- Children: 1
- Writing career
- Years active: 1986–present

Bruce Lewis Helford (born January 28, 1952) is an American television writer and producer.

== Career ==
Helford was executive producer and writer for the sitcom Roseanne during season five of the series (1992–1993). Years later, he was showrunner and one of several executive producers of the revived tenth season of Roseanne and co-creator and executive producer of its spin-off series The Conners.

Helford is the co-creator of The Drew Carey Show and was executive producer of the series for its entire run, from 1995 to 2004. He also created or co-created the series The Norm Show, Wanda at Large, Freddie, George Lopez, Nikki, and Bless This House.

In 1991, Helford launched Mohawk Productions to produce shows created or executive produced by him. Mohawk is famous for its logo, consisting of an ultrasound baby (an image of his son, Aven). Mohawk is affiliated with Warner Bros. Television. Anger Management starring Charlie Sheen premiered in 2012 on cable channel FX. In 2016, Helford co-created the CBS sitcom Kevin Can Wait and served as the series' showrunner for the first thirteen episodes before leaving the show that November due to creative differences.

== Filmography ==
=== Television ===
Year	Title	Contribution	Notes
1985–1989	Family Ties	Writer	Writer of 5 episodes
1987–1988	The Bronx Zoo	Writer/Producer	
1991	Anything But Love	Writer	
1992–1993; 2018	Roseanne	Writer/Producer	Executive Producer of 34 episodes Writer of 1 episode
1994	Someone Like Me	Creator	
1995–1996	Bless This House	Creator	Creator/Executive Producer of 16 episodes Writer of 2 episodes
1995–2004	The Drew Carey Show	Writer/Creator/Producer	Creator/Executive Producer of 233 episodes Writer of 6 episodes
1999–2001	Norm	Writer/Creator	
2000–2002	Nikki	Writer/Creator/Producer	Creator/Executive Producer of 41 episodes Writer of 1 episode
2001–2002	The Oblongs	Producer	Executive Producer of 13 episodes
2002–2007	George Lopez	Writer/Creator/Producer	Creator/Executive Producer of 120 episodes Writer of 3 episodes
2003	Wanda at Large	Creator/Producer	
2005–2006	Freddie	Writer/Creator/Producer	
2012–2014	Anger Management	Writer/Creator/Producer	Creator/Executive Producer of 100 episodes Writer of 4 episodes Story/Teleplay of 1 episode
2016	Kevin Can Wait	Writer/Creator/Producer	Creator; Executive Producer of 13 episodes
2018–2025	The Conners	Writer/Developer/Producer	Developer/Executive Producer
2022–2025	Lopez vs Lopez	Writer/Co-Showrunner/Executive Producer	Executive Producer
2026–present	Newlyweds	Writer/Showrunner/Executive Producer	Executive Producer
