= Wanda at Large =

American sitcom

- Genre: Sitcom
- Created by: Bruce Helford; Les Firestein; Wanda Sykes; Lance Crouther
- Starring: Wanda Sykes; Phil Morris; Dale Godboldo; Tammy Lauren; Jurnee Smollett; Robert Bailey Jr.
- Composer: Mathematics
- Country of origin: United States
- Original language: English
- No. of seasons: 2
- No. of episodes: 19

Production
- Executive producers: Les Firestein; Brian Hargrove; Bruce Helford; Jack Kenny; Deborah Oppenheimer
- Producers: Michael Attanasio; Jennifer Fisher; Ernest Johnson; Lisa Koontz; Wanda Sykes
- Cinematography: Gregg Heschong; Julius Metoyer
- Editor: Larry Harris
- Camera setup: Multi-camera
- Running time: 22–24 minutes
- Production companies: Mohawk Productions; Warner Bros. Television

Original release
- Network: Fox
- Release: March 26 – November 7, 2003

Wanda at Large is an American sitcom starring Wanda Sykes; Sykes also created the series alongside Bruce Helford, Les Firestein, and Lance Crouther. The series aired for two seasons on Fox from March 26 to November 7, 2003.

== Synopsis ==
Sykes starred as Wanda Hawkins, a former government worker who decides to become a stand-up comedian. Through her friend Keith (Dale Godboldo), Wanda is tapped by WHDC-TV head Roger to become a new editorial correspondent for the low-rated political talk show The Beltway Gang . She is immediately seen as unprofessional and inexperienced by the show's moderators, Bradley (Phil Morris) and Rita (Ann Magnuson), whose conservative politics clash with Wanda's liberal views. At home, she must deal with her sister-in-law Jenny (Tammy Lauren), a widow raising Wanda's niece Holly (Jurnee Smollett) and nephew Barris (Robert Bailey Jr.), whom Wanda finds irritating. As the show progresses, Wanda begins to bond with her family and win over her colleagues, with some hinted attraction to Bradley.

== Cast ==
- Wanda Sykes as Wanda Hawkins
- Phil Morris as Bradley Grimes
- Dale Godboldo as Keith Townsend
- Tammy Lauren as Jenny Hawkins
- Jurnee Smollett as Holly Hawkins
- Robert Bailey Jr. as Barris Hawkins

=== Recurring ===
- Jason Kravitz as Roger
- Ann Magnuson as Rita Bahlberg

== Episodes ==
=== Series overview ===
Season	Episodes	Originally released	
Season	Episodes	First released	Last released
1	6	March 26, 2003	April 30, 2003
2	13	September 19, 2003	November 7, 2003

=== Season 1 (2003) ===
No. overall	No. in season	Title	Directed by	Written by	Original release date	Prod. code
1	1	"Pilot"	Gerry Cohen	Bruce Helford & Les Firestein & Wanda Sykes & Lance Crouther	March 26, 2003	475357
2	2	"King Rat"	John Blanchard	Sue Murphy	April 2, 2003	175805
3	3	"Wanda and Bradley"	John Blanchard	Lance Crouther	April 9, 2003	175803
4	4	"Wanda's Party"	Bob Koherr	Dino Shorte & Jack Lugar	April 16, 2003	175806
5	5	"Death of a Councilman"	Leonard R. Garner Jr.	Wanda Sykes	April 23, 2003	175802
6	6	"Alma Mater"	Leonard R. Garner Jr.	Barton Dean	April 30, 2003	175804

=== Season 2 (2003) ===
No. overall	No. in season	Title	Directed by	Written by	Original release date	Prod. code
7	1	"The Favor"	Lee Shallat Chemel	Lance Crouther	September 19, 2003	177351
When Wanda looks to score an interview with a troubled athlete (Adam Lazarre-White), it forces her to reconnect with her ex-husband (Dave Chappelle).
8	2	"Where's Roger?"	Bob Koherr	Jack Kenny & Brian Hargrove	September 26, 2003	177353
9	3	"Bradley Has a Friend?"	Lee Shallat Chemel	Jack Kenny & Brian Hargrove	October 3, 2003	177354
10	4	"Leave Your Daughter at Home Day"	Bob Koherr	Jennifer Fisher	October 17, 2003	177355
11	5	"They Shoot Reporters, Don't They?"	Katy Garretson	Dino Shorte	October 31, 2003	177357
12	6	"Hurricane Hawkins"	Shelley Jensen	Alyson Fouse	October 31, 2003	177352
13	7	"Clowns to the Left of Me"	Bob Koherr	Wanda Sykes	November 7, 2003	177356
14	8	"Back to the Club"	Leonard R. Garner Jr.	Sue Murphy	November 7, 2003	177358
15	9	"Only Built for Cuban Wandas"	Bob Koherr	Lance Crouther	Unaired	177362
16	10	"Did Wanda Say a 4-Letter Word?"	Bob Koherr	Lance Crouther	Unaired	177359
17	11	"The Plane Trip"	Bob Koherr	Jennifer Fisher	Unaired	177363
18	12	"The Un-Natural"	Linda Mendoza	Patrick Meighan	Unaired	177361
19	13	"Twas the Knife Before Christmas"	Bob Koherr	Alyson Fouse	Unaired	177360
Jenny comes down with appendicitis, forcing Wanda to look after Holly and Barris.

== Production and cancellation ==
Fox premiered it on March 26, 2003. Fox renewed the show for a second season. The show returned with new episodes in September 2003, but in the so-called Friday night death slot at 8:00 pm. It was canceled on November 7, along with the new Fox comedy series Luis.

During an interview with the Urbanite magazine at Georgia State University, Sykes explained that the show was only supposed to be on Friday night for an interim basis. According to Sykes, "We were told if the new night didn't work out, we would be moved to another timeslot. But, that's part of the game television execs play." She also admitted in a January 2004 interview that she wished that the series would have launched on UPN instead of Fox.

== Broadcast and syndication ==
Reruns began airing regularly on July 5, 2006 on American cable channel TV One. The unaired second-season episodes were aired for the first time on TV One on July 4, 2006, during the 4th of July launch marathon of the series.

In 2022, the series was made available for streaming online on Fox Corporation's Tubi.

== Reception ==
=== Ratings ===
Wanda at Large premiered on Fox on March 26, 2003, following American Idol. It gradually decreased in the ratings, premiering with 14.3 million viewers, and diminishing to 10 million by the season finale. It still averaged 12.2 million for the six-episode season, however, making it the fourth highest-rated show on Fox that year out of 26, and leading Fox to renew the show. In September, the show returned with new episodes in the Friday night death slot at 8:30 pm.

=== Awards and nominations ===
Year	Award	Category	Recipient	Result
2004	BET Comedy Awards	Outstanding Comedy Series	Wanda at Large	Nominated
2004	BET Comedy Awards	Outstanding Lead Actress in a Comedy Series	Wanda Sykes	Nominated
2004	Satellite Awards	Best Performance by an Actress in a Series, Comedy or Musical	Wanda Skyes	Nominated
2003	Teen Choice Awards	Choice TV Breakout Show	Wanda at Large	Nominated
2003	Teen Choice Awards	Choice TV Breakout Star - Female	Wanda Sykes	Nominated
2003	Teen Choice Awards	Choice TV Actress - Comedy	Wanda Sykes	Nominated
