= Suckers (film) =

2001 film by Roger Nygard

- Directed by: Roger Nygard
- Written by: Roger Nygard; Joe Yanetty
- Produced by: W.K. Border
- Starring: Daniel Benzali; Louis Mandylor; Lori Loughlin
- Cinematography: Nathan Hope
- Edited by: Roger Nygard
- Music by: Billy Sullivan; Walter Werzowa
- Production company: NEO Motion Pictures
- Distributed by: Creative Light Entertainment; Creative Light Worldwide
- Release date: 2001
- Running time: 87 minutes
- Country: United States
- Language: English
- Budget: $2 million

Suckers is a 2001 American comedy-drama film directed by Roger Nygard, who co-wrote the story with Joe Yanetty. It is about the car sales business in the United States, and stars Joe Yannetty, Jake Johannsen, Daniel Benzali, Michael D. Roberts, Louis Mandylor and Lori Loughlin.

== Premise ==
Bobby (played by Louis Mandylor) is a nice guy looking for work. He also owes a lot of money to two loan sharks, Chad and Everett. One day he walks into Southside Motors in L.A. and takes a job as a car salesman. From there he enters into the shady world of car sales. The dealership manager (played by Daniel Benzali) is a bald-headed bully who has no qualms about screwing the customer. Unfortunately for Bobby, he doesn't have the knack for screwing the customers. Further complications ensue when the loan sharks come to collect money that Bobby owes them.

== Cast ==
- Joe Yannetty as Joe
- Jake Johannsen as Lance
- Daniel Benzali as Reggie
- David Ackert as Shamin
- Utah Blue as Mike
- Eli Danker as Mohammed
- Wayne Duvall as Randall
- Louis Mandylor as Bobby DeLuca
- David Poland as Ali
- Michael D. Roberts as Eddie
- Valente Rodriguez as Marco
- Joshua Sweet as Roger
- BT as J.J.
- Daniel Villareal as Javier
- Darren Gray Ward as Sean
- Lori Loughlin as Donna DeLuca
- Peter Breitmayer as Shower Customer
- Larry Brown as Pathetic Customer
- David A. Brooks as Chad
- William Shockley as Everett
- Tim Thomerson as Detective Laughlin
- Stacy Pema as Operator

== Background ==
The story for the film was written by Joe Yanetty and Roger Nygard, who is a stand-up comic and former car salesman. Nygard also directed the film. For the story, Nygard drew on accounts that he had heard from his car dealer friends. One was about a woman who used sex to steal a car and left the salesman stranded and naked.

=== Premiere and awards ===
The film had its premiere at the Comedy Arts Festival in Aspen. The film was a 2001 Video Premiere Award Winner in the Screenplay category, beating Tony Johnston's Full Disclosure by David Davis and Brian Cox, O.K. Garage by Brandon Cole, and Doug Campbell's The Tomorrow Man. It was shown at the 2000 Cinequest Film Festival. It picked up an award at the festival in the "Special Jury Artistic Merit Award" category. It was also an entrant at the Waterfront Film Festival.

The film has played on HBO and Cinemax.

== Releases ==
- Sucker$ - Sand Hill SH 0061 - 2001
- Suckers - Planet - 2001
- Suckers - Victory Multimedia - 2001
- Suckers - Razor Digital Entertainment - 2004
- Tough Guys: Suckers / Sex and Bullets - Razor - 2005
