= List of Murder One characters =

This is a list of characters in the ABC television drama Murder One. The American legal drama television series that aired on ABC from 1995 to 1997. It was created by Steven Bochco, Charles H. Eglee, and Channing Gibson.

== Hoffman and Associates ==
=== Theodore Hoffman ===
(Daniel Benzali) The head of the firm, and a respected veteran defense attorney. He gets Richard Cross cleared for Jessica's murder but is surprised to find himself later defending Neil Avedon for the same murder. He spends much of the first season exploring alternative theories as to who killed Jessica Costello in an attempt to clear Neil's name.

=== Justine Appleton ===
(Mary McCormack) Justine is highly driven, and her ambition has overridden her better judgment on more than one occasion. She made no secret of her desire to make second chair when Richard Cross was charged, though Ted ultimately chose Lisa. She later began doing business with Cross, which led to Ted firing her after he found out. He later took her back, however, after she gave the firm valuable information regarding Cross.

=== Chris Docknovitch ===
(Michael Hayden) A younger attorney, and highly ambitious (though less so than Justine). He served as second chair during the Avedon trial.

=== Arnold Spivak ===
(J.C. MacKenzie) A brilliant legal mind, able to obtain relevant precedents from past cases about current ones. His intelligence is tempered by his awkwardness in social situations, which has rarely led to him making the second chair in cases. A mutual attraction developed between him and Julie Costello, though that ended when she abruptly married Richard Cross.

=== Lisa Gillespie ===
(Grace Phillips) Lisa served as Ted's second chair during the Richard Cross case. She was also having a relationship with Chris.

=== Louis Hines ===
(John Fleck) Louis is Ted's assistant.

=== Dave Blalock ===
(Kevin Tighe) Davie Blalock served as the firm's private investigator until he was murdered by Rusty Arnold while following up a lead for the Avedon case.

=== Ray Velacek ===
(Joe Spano) Ray is a retired police detective whom the firm defended in an assault charge after he attempted to protect a woman from her abusive husband. After Dave Blalock's death, Hoffman hired him as the firm's new investigator.

=== Lila ===
(Vanessa A. Williams) Lila is the firm's receptionist. Her role on the series is limited though the firm did defend her fiancée on a charge in an early episode.

== Prosecutors and Police ==
=== Miriam Grasso ===
(Barbara Bosson) The lead prosecutor in the Avedon trial. Her un-chic wardrobe and simple demeanour belie the fact that she is a fierce and effective prosecutor. Despite the adversarial nature of their jobs, she and Ted are good friends and have mutual personal and professional respect.

=== Detective Arthur Polson ===
(Dylan Baker) A detective in the LAPD's Robbery/Homicide department, he is in charge of investigating the murder of Jessica Costello, arresting Richard Cross, then Neil Avedon for the murder. He and Ted were frequently butted heads, though tensions eased between the two after Ted's daughter was abducted.

=== Roger Garfield ===
(Gregory Itzin) The political-minded District Attorney of the county of Los Angeles, with aspirations for being elected Governor of California. His professional decisions appear to be based at least as much on how the public perceives him as on what is truly the right course of action.

=== Mark Washington ===
(Markus Redmond) The second chair was during the Avedon case. He is a younger, less experienced ADA. Though generally competent, he did not endear himself in the eyes of the jury with his aggressive cross-examination of Neil Avedon's mother.

== Others ==
=== Richard Cross ===
(Stanley Tucci). A millionaire businessman, a longtime acquaintance of Ted's, and the first man arrested for Jessica Costello's murder. The charges are quickly dismissed after Cross produces an alibi and he later bankrolled Neil Avedon's defence, claiming him to be a friend. As time passes, however, Ted becomes convinced that Cross is manipulating events and may be part of a conspiracy to frame Neil for the murder. Cross was a notorious philanderer and was eventually found to be HIV positive. Once he could no longer safely engage in sex with others, he would set up Jessica and her sister Julie with men, then obtain sexual gratification by having them describe the encounters in graphic detail.

=== Neil Avedon ===
(Jason Gedrick) A popular movie actor with a long history of misdemeanours, who frequently abused drugs and alcohol. The show began with Ted obtaining a deal for Neil following his latest offence, then angrily dismissing him as a client for his reckless behaviour. Ted later reluctantly took his case after he was arrested for the murder of Jessica (whom he'd been dating).

=== Julie Costello ===
(Bobbie Philips) Jessica's older sister, and a model with a checkered past of her own, largely due to her romantic involvement with Richard Cross. She was originally set to testify against Cross at Neil's trial but stunned Ted and the entire court with the revelation that she could no longer testify as she and Cross had just eloped.

=== Annie Hoffman ===
(Patricia Clarkson) Ted's patient and loving wife. She and Ted attempted to shield their young daughter Elizabeth from the heavy public scrutiny of the trial (with limited success). After the trial continued to infiltrate their lives, culminating in Elizabeth being abducted briefly, Annie asked for a separation, and eventually a divorce. After the end of the trial, there were indications the two would reconcile, however.

=== Judge Beth Bornstein ===
(Linda Carlson) The presiding judge over the Avedon trial. She and Ted had been romantically involved several years before he was married, though their relationship in the courtroom was strictly professional.

=== Francesca Cross ===
(Donna Murphy) Richard's first wife and a close friend of Ted's. She grew tired of his long history of infidelity and divorced him soon after he was cleared of Jessica's murder. She later had a brief affair with Ted after he and Annie separated.

=== Dr. Graham Lester ===
(Stanley Kamel) Neil's psychiatrist was later found to be part of a conspiracy to frame Neil. He testified that Neil had called his office the night of Jessica's murder and confessed to the crime. Hoffman attempted to undermine his credibility by presenting evidence that Lester had sexually abused female patients.

=== Roberto Portalegre ===
(Miguel Sandoval) A business associate of Richard Cross' from Brazil, he is a cocaine dealer. Cross asked Ted to represent Roberto's son Eduardo on a rape charge, though Roberto paid the young girl off before he can do anything. After Eduardo is later charged with attempting to strangle another girl, Ted begins to wonder if he had something to do with Jessica's death.

=== Gary Blondo ===
(John Pleshette) A producer from the studio that produced Neil's latest movie Deadbolt. He is one of the people mentioned in Jessica's diary and had possibly slept with her, making him a suspect in her murder. He attempted to feign illness to avoid taking the stand, though the ruse was quickly exposed.

=== Jessica Costello ===
(Collette White) The victim; a fifteen-year-old girl found naked and strangled in her bedroom after having sex with an older man. Numerous suspects and theories surfaced throughout the trial though the identity of her killer was not revealed until the season finale.
