= Gaby Hoffmann =

American actress (born 1982)

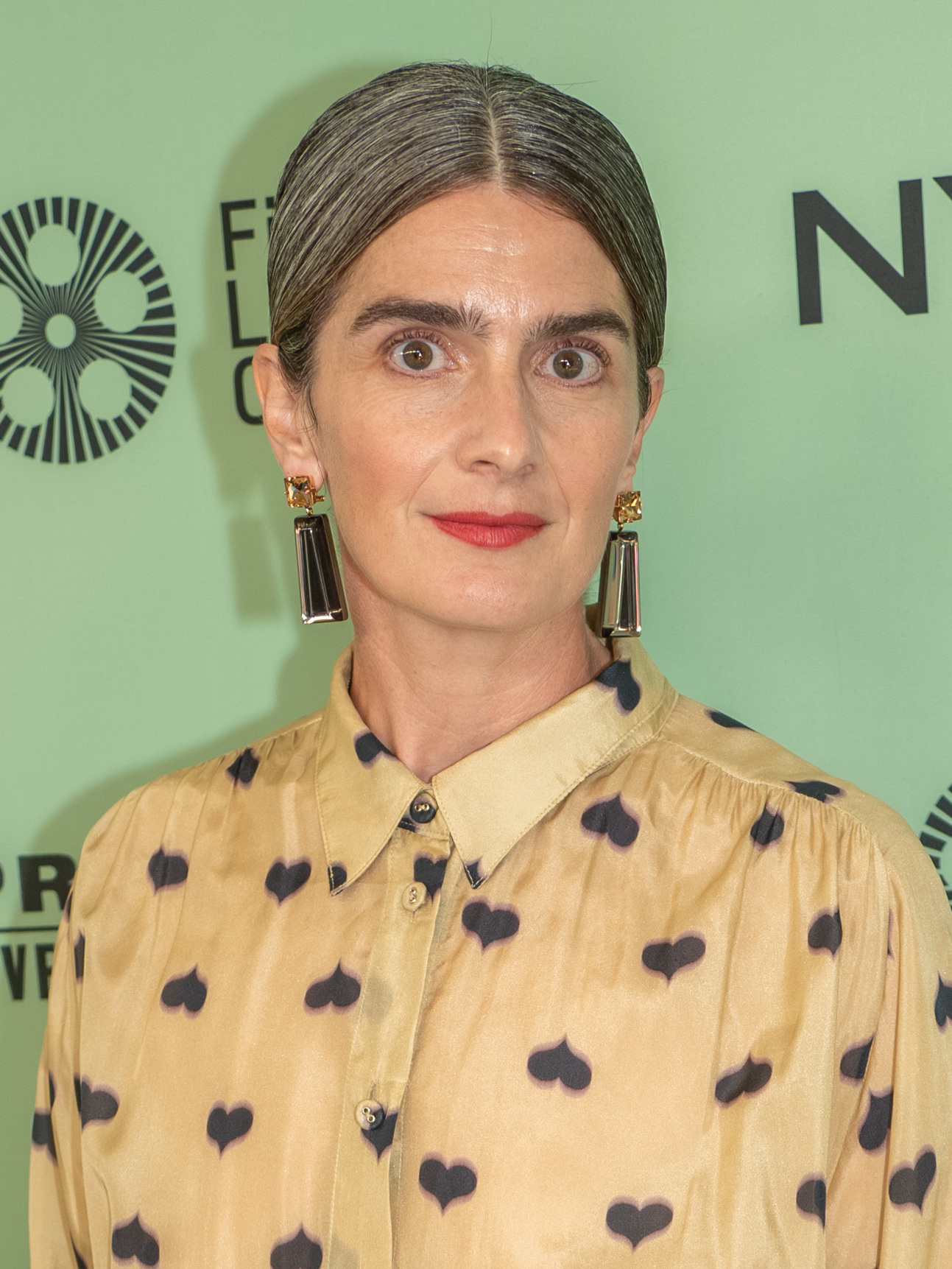
- Hoffmann in 2025
- Born: Gabrielle Mary Antonia Hoffmann; January 8, 1982 (age 44); New York City, U.S.
- Education: Bard College (2004)
- Occupation: Actress
- Years active: 1988–present
- Partner: Chris Dapkins
- Children: 1
- Parents: Anthony Herrera (father); Viva (mother)

Gabrielle Mary Antonia Hoffmann (born January 8, 1982) is an American actress. She made her film debut in Field of Dreams (1989) and found success as a child actress in Uncle Buck (1989), This Is My Life (1992), The Man Without a Face (1993), Sleepless in Seattle (1993), and then later as a teenager with Now and Then (1995), Everyone Says I Love You (1996), Volcano (1997), All I Wanna Do (1998), and 200 Cigarettes (1999).

After a hiatus from the industry, Hoffmann returned in 2007, appearing in various independent projects that garnered critical acclaim. This has been described as a career "resurgence", due to her roles in Crystal Fairy & the Magical Cactus (2013), Obvious Child (2014), Wild (2014), and C'mon C'mon (2021). On television, she played April in the FX series Louie (2012), Caroline Sackler in the HBO series Girls (2014–2017), and Ali Pfefferman in the Amazon Prime series Transparent (2014–2019), earning three Primetime Emmy Award nominations for the latter two.

== Early life ==
Hoffmann was born in New York City to actor parents. Her mother, Viva, is a retired actress, writer and former Warhol superstar. Her father, Anthony Herrera, was a soap opera actor best known for his role as James Stenbeck in As the World Turns. Herrera was raised in Wiggins, Mississippi, by his maternal grandparents. His own father, Gaby's paternal grandfather, was of French and Spanish descent. Herrera died in 2011 from cancer.

Viva and Herrera were estranged shortly after Hoffmann's birth; she was raised by her mother at the Chelsea Hotel in Chelsea, Manhattan, New York. Her father did not have a significant presence in her life. Hoffmann's birth is documented in Pat Hackett's The Andy Warhol Diaries. An entry dated January 10, 1982, two days after Hoffmann was born, says a friend telephoned Warhol and told him they were going to the Chelsea Hotel to see Viva and her new baby.

Hoffmann attended elementary school in Manhattan at P.S. 3 on Hudson Street in the West Village, then another school in Hell's Kitchen. After she moved to Los Angeles in 1994, she attended the Buckley School, before finally graduating from Calabasas High School in 1999.

=== Life at the Chelsea Hotel ===
Until July 1993 at age 11, Hoffmann lived in Manhattan's Chelsea Hotel, which she later said she enjoyed. According to Hoffmann, she and her best friend, Talya Shomron, roller-skated in the hallways, spied on the drug dealer across the hall, and persuaded the bellman to go to the neighborhood delicatessen at night to fetch them ice cream.

Hoffmann recalled, "I grew up in downtown New York in the '80s. I have a friend who grew up with me, and she puts it well. She says, 'If you grew up where we grew up, if you weren't an artist, a drag queen, queer, or a drug addict, then you were the freak.' I grew up in a world where I guess what is considered unusual or abnormal for the rest of America was very much considered the norm." She also reported in an interview that there had been gunfire and a rape at the hotel shortly before they moved out.

Hoffmann and her mother left the Chelsea Hotel after a long-standing dispute with the management that ended in eviction. Regardless, Hoffmann's connection to the hotel had a significant effect on her future. The idea for the 1994 sitcom Someone Like Me originated after Gail Berman (former president of Viacom's Paramount Pictures) read a New York Times article about the hotel which referred to a children's book that Viva and friend Jane Lancellotti wrote, Gaby at the Chelsea (a take on Kay Thompson's 1950s classic Eloise books). Berman became the show's producer.

=== Adolescence on the West Coast ===
After leaving the Chelsea when she was 12, Hoffmann and her mother moved to the west coast to a two-bedroom rented house in Woodland Hills, Los Angeles, California, which was badly damaged in the January 17, 1994 Northridge earthquake. While regrouping their living situation, Hoffmann and her mother temporarily lived at The Oceana Suites Hotel in Santa Monica, California.

=== College and assorted jobs ===
After she graduated from Calabasas High School in 1999, Hoffmann followed her half-sister Alex's example and entered New York's Bard College to pursue a degree in literature and writing. Around 2001, she temporarily left her acting career to complete her studies and graduated in 2004. Her senior thesis was a documentary film.

After college, she spent much of her 20s drifting. She interned with a chef in Italy, then trained to be a doula after helping deliver Alex's children. For a time, Hoffmann and a boyfriend lived in an old trailer in the Catskill Mountains.

== Career ==
=== 1988–2001: Child actress ===
Hoffmann began acting in commercials at the age of four to help pay the family bills. In 1989, she starred in her first movie, Field of Dreams, with Kevin Costner, playing his character's daughter, Karin. 1989's Uncle Buck followed, working beside John Candy and child star Macaulay Culkin. After Uncle Buck, Hoffmann grew tired of the rigors of screen performance and temporarily retired. Upon hearing of co-star Culkin's income from his following feature films, she reentered the profession. She starred in This Is My Life (1992), Sleepless in Seattle (1993) with Tom Hanks, and The Man Without a Face with Mel Gibson. According to Hoffmann, the reception from This is My Life gave her confidence and solidified her desire to return to acting full-time.

In 1994, Hoffmann starred in her own sitcom Someone Like Me (on NBC) about a young girl, Gaby, and her dysfunctional family. Although generally well received, the series lasted only six episodes. After Someone Like Me, Hoffmann led alongside Shelley Long in the 1995 TV film Freaky Friday, a remake of the 1976 film of the same name starring Jodie Foster and Barbara Harris. In the same year as Freaky Friday, Hoffmann starred as Young Samantha, the childhood counterpart to Demi Moore's character, in the coming-of-age feature film Now and Then.

The same year, Hoffmann played Andrea Eagerton in the CBS TV film Whose Daughter Is She?. Between 1996 and 2001, Hoffmann landed roles in several films including Everyone Says I Love You (1996), Volcano (1997), Snapped (1998), The Hairy Bird (1998), 200 Cigarettes (1999), Coming Soon (1999), Black & White (1999), You Can Count on Me (2000), and Perfume (2001).

=== 2003–2009: Theatre work in New York ===
Between 2003 and 2007, Hoffmann concentrated on theater in New York. Roles included 24 Hour Plays (as Denise at the American Airlines Theatre), The Sugar Syndrome (Williamstown Theatre Festival – July/August 2005), and Third (Mitzi E. Newhouse Theater/Lincoln Center Theater – September – December 2005). In late 2005, she starred in an episode of Law & Order: Criminal Intent. She also appeared in the Broadway play SubUrbia, alongside Kieran Culkin and Jessica Capshaw at the Second Stage Theatre on 43rd Street in New York City, which ran from September to October 2006. Hoffmann then returned to the 24 Hours Plays where she acted alongside Jennifer Aniston.

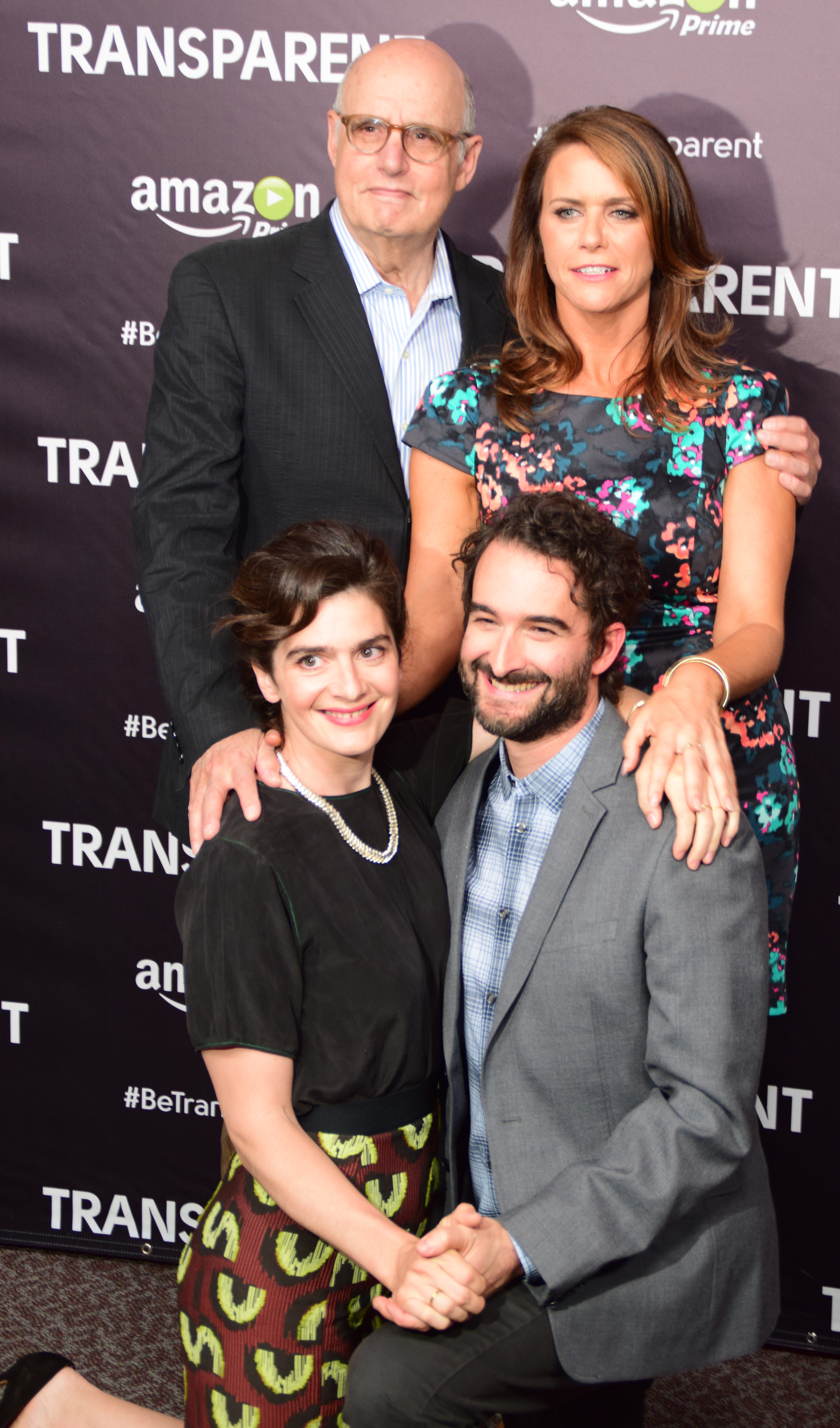
Hoffmann (bottom left) with fellow cast members of Transparent in 2015

Since 2007, Hoffmann has made a gradual return to film acting. In 2007, she starred in the film Severed Ways: The Norse Discovery of America. In 2008, she appeared in Guest of Cindy Sherman, a documentary on art-scene commentator Paul Hasegawa-Overacker's relationship with enigmatic photographer Cindy Sherman. Sherman was married to Hoffmann's stepfather, Michel Auder, from 1984 to 1999.

Later in 2008, Hoffmann appeared in the documentary Chelsea on the Rocks, which is a tribute to the Chelsea Hotel where she grew up. Directed by Abel Ferrara, the documentary highlights the many personalities and artistic voices that have emerged from the hotel. In 2009, she had a supporting role in Todd Solondz's Life During Wartime, and the thriller 13 with Mickey Rourke (released in 2010).

=== 2010–present: Career expansion ===
Several years later, Hoffmann starred alongside Michael Cera in the adventure comedy film Crystal Fairy & the Magical Cactus (2013) directed by Sebastián Silva. While shooting the film in Chile, she and Cera took mescaline for her performance, which was nominated for the Independent Spirit Award for Best Female Lead. In 2013, she joined the Web series entitled Lyle, created by Stewart Thorndike and Joey Soloway. As the series was shot in NYC, she subsequently acquired an apartment in Brooklyn's Fort Greene section. In October 2013, she starred in the 1910s installment of Vanity Fair's The Decades Series, "The First March", directed by Gilly Barnes.

In 2012 she portrayed April, a love interest and neurotic ex-girlfriend of the title character portrayed by Louis C.K. in the FX series Louie. Hoffmann took a recurring role portraying Caroline Sackler, the sister of Adam Sackler (Adam Driver) on the Lena Dunham created HBO series Girls from 2014 to 2017. Her performance was well-received and earned her a nomination for the Primetime Emmy Award for Outstanding Guest Actress in a Comedy Series in 2015.

Joey Soloway, who had watched Hoffman in the third season of Louie, would subsequently write the role Hoffmann plays in Transparent. In 2016, she appeared in pre-recorded video as an onstage "stand-in" during Sia's Nostalgic for the Present concert tour, for the song "Unstoppable." Her performance is featured on the song's official music video, released in 2021. In 2021, she acted in the Mike Mills drama C'mon C'mon. She acted opposite Joaquin Phoenix playing his estranged sister, Viv, whose husband is going through mental problems. She was nominated for the Gotham Independent Film Award for Outstanding Supporting Performance. From 2022 to 2023, she appeared in the HBO series Winning Time: The Rise of the Lakers Dynasty. In 2024, she co-led the Netflix miniseries Eric alongside Benedict Cumberbatch.

== Personal life ==
Hoffmann has a daughter, born in 2014, with longtime boyfriend, cinematographer Chris Dapkins.

She lives in the Fort Greene neighborhood of Brooklyn.

== Acting credits ==
Key
†	Denotes films that have not yet been released

=== Film ===
Year	Title	Role	Notes
1989	Field of Dreams	Karin Kinsella	
1989	Uncle Buck	Maizy Russell	
1992	This Is My Life	Opal Ingels	
1993	Sleepless in Seattle	Jessica	
1993	The Man Without a Face	Megan Norstadt	
1995	Now and Then	Samantha "Sam" Albertson	
1996	Everyone Says I Love You	Lane Dandridge	
1997	Volcano	Kelly Roark	
1998	All I Wanna Do	Odette Sinclair	
1998	Snapped	Tara	
1999	200 Cigarettes	Stephie	
1999	Coming Soon	Jenny Simon	
1999	Black and White	Raven	
2000	You Can Count on Me	Sheila Seidleman	
2001	Perfume	Gabrielle Mancini	
2007	Severed Ways	Orn's Wife	
2009	Life During Wartime	Wanda	
2010	13	Clara Ferro	
2011	Wolfe with an E	Karen	
2011	The Surrogate Mary	Sally	
2012	Nate & Margaret	Darla	
2013	Crystal Fairy & the Magical Cactus	Crystal Fairy	
2013	All That I Am	Susan	
2013	Goodbye World	Laura	
2014	Obvious Child	Nellie	
2014	Veronica Mars	Ruby Jetson	
2014	Wild	Aimee	
2014	Lyle	Leah	
2014	Manhattan Romance	Emmy	
2021	C'mon C'mon	Viv	
2024	Junk	Martin 2.0	
2025	For Worse	Liz	
2025	The Mastermind	Maude	
2025	Springsteen: Deliver Me from Nowhere	Adele Springsteen	
TBA	Deep Cuts		Post-production
TBA	Time Out		Filming

=== Television ===
Year	Title	Role	Notes
1994	Someone Like Me	Gaby Stepjak	5 episodes
1995	Freaky Friday	Annabelle Andrews	Television film
1995	Whose Daughter Is She?	Andrea Eagerton	Television film
2005	Law & Order: Criminal Intent	Rachel Burnett	Episode: "The Good Child"
2009	The Eastmans	Dr. Sally Eastman	Unsold television pilot
2010	Private Practice	Emily	Episode: "Just Lose It"
2011	The Good Wife	Rhonda Cerone	Episode: "Killer Song"
2011	Homeland	CNN Producer	Episode: "Clean Skin"
2012	Louie	April	Episode: "Something Is Wrong"
2014–2017	Girls	Caroline Sackler	Recurring role (seasons 3–6), 8 episodes
2014–2019	Transparent	Ali Pfefferman	42 episodes
2016	High Maintenance	Gaby	Episode: "Tick"
2022–2023	Winning Time: The Rise of the Lakers Dynasty	Claire Rothman	17 episodes
2024	Eric	Cassie Anderson	Miniseries
2025	Zero Day	Monica Kidder	Miniseries
2025	Poker Face	Fran Lamont	Episode: "The Taste of Human Blood"
TBA	The Best of Us	Kathleen McCormick	Upcoming miniseries
2026	Phony	Tracy Marks	Season 1 Episode 6 - I’m Right Here

=== Theatre ===
Year	Title	Role	Playwright	Venue	Ref.
2005	The Sugar Syndrome	Dani	Lucy Prebble	Williamstown Theatre Festival	
2005	Third	Emily Imbrie	Wendy Wasserstein	Mitzi E. Newhouse Theatre, Lincoln Center	
2006	SubUrbia	Sooze	Eric Bogosian	Second Stage Theatre, Off-Broadway	
2007	The Machine	Ensemble	Betty Shamieh	The Duke On 42nd Street, Off-Broadway	
2010	The 24 Hour Plays	Performer	Various	American Airlines Theatre, Broadway	

=== Music videos ===
Year	Title	Artist(s)
2021	"Unstoppable"	Sia

== Awards and nominations ==
Organizations	Year	Category	Work	Result	Ref.
Gotham Awards	2021	Outstanding Supporting Performance	C'mon C'mon	Nominated	
Independent Spirit Award	2013	Best Female Lead	Crystal Fairy & the Magical Cactus	Nominated	
Primetime Emmy Awards	2015	Outstanding Guest Actress in a Comedy Series	Girls (episode: "Home Birth")	Nominated	
Primetime Emmy Awards	2015	Outstanding Supporting Actress in a Comedy Series	Transparent (episode: "Rollin")	Nominated	
Primetime Emmy Awards	2016	Outstanding Supporting Actress in a Comedy Series	Transparent (episode: "Bulnerable")	Nominated	
Screen Actors Guild Awards	2016	Outstanding Ensemble in a Comedy Series	Transparent (season 2)	Nominated	
Young Artist Award	1990	Best Young Actress Supporting Role in a Motion Picture	Field of Dreams	Won	
Young Artist Award	1993	Best Young Actress Under Ten in a Motion Picture	This Is My Life	Nominated	
Young Artist Award	1994	Best Youth Actress in a Motion Picture Drama	The Man Without a Face	Nominated	
Young Artist Award	1995	Best Youth Comedienne in a TV Show	Someone Like Me	Nominated	
Young Artist Award	1996	Best Young Ensemble – Feature Film or Video	Now and Then	Nominated	
Young Artist Award	1997	Best Young Actress in a Comedy Film	Everyone Says I Love You	Nominated	
