= Daniel Benzali =

Brazil-born American actor

- Born: January 20, 1946 (age 80); Rio de Janeiro, Brazil
- Years active: 1983–2015
- Spouse: Lynda Medwell (m. 1979; div. 1984)

Daniel Benzali (born January 20, 1946) is a Brazilian retired stage, television and film actor.

== Early life ==
Benzali was born in Rio de Janeiro, Brazil, the son of Lee, a cook, and Carlo Benzali, a salesman who had also been an actor in Brazilian theatre and Yiddish theatre. His family are Brazilian Jews. Daniel Benzali is the middle son of three. The family moved to the United States in 1953, and the boys were raised in Brooklyn, New York City.

== Career ==
=== Theatre ===
Benzali began his acting career as a theatre actor, including the Royal Shakespeare Company in Great Britain. His first performance was in Holiday at The Old Vic alongside Mary Steenburgen and Malcolm McDowell.

He also played musical theater, including a portrayal of Juan Perón in the West End cast of Evita. He played faded film director Max von Mayerling, alongside Patti LuPone, in the original (1993) cast of Andrew Lloyd Webber's Sunset Boulevard. Benzali also appeared in US national tours of Fiddler on the Roof and Annie and other smaller regional productions.

In 2019, Benzali was slated to play the lead role in the London staging of Bianca Bagatourian's The Time Of Our Lies. He withdrew on opening night due to unforeseen circumstances.

=== Television and feature films ===
In 1985, he was cast in the James Bond film A View to a Kill as W. G. Howe, the Californian director of Oil and Mines, based at San Francisco City Hall. The character was shot dead in his office there by Max Zorin (played by Christopher Walken).

Subsequently, he began appearing in guest-starring roles on television series such as Strong Medicine, Star Trek: The Next Generation, The X-Files, and in recurring roles in NYPD Blue and L.A. Law. NYPD Blue and L.A. Law creator Steven Bochco was so impressed with Benzali's performances that Bochco later cast him in the lead role of his 1995 series Murder One, playing attorney Ted Hoffman. For his performance, Benzali was nominated for a Golden Globe Award. The series was not especially successful (though highly regarded later), and Benzali left after its first season. Bochco later revealed that he fired Benzali because he refused to leave his home before he completed his morning bowel movement and was perpetually late to the set.

Benzali's stage performance in Holiday at The Old Vic so impressed director Anthony Page that Page cast him opposite Teri Garr in the Hallmark Hall of Fame TV movie adaptation of Pack of Lies, a play by English writer Hugh Whitemore. Benzali also starred in the TV series The Agency and appeared in feature films including By Dawn's Early Light (1990), Murder at 1600 (1997), The Grey Zone (2001), and Suckers (2001). He appeared in the post-apocalyptic CBS series Jericho as the enigmatic former Department of Homeland Security director Thomas Valente. After that, he starred in the FX television series Nip/Tuck as Dr. Griffin.

In December 2010, Benzali joined ABC's General Hospital. Benzali played a character named Theodore Hoffman, a reference to his role on the mid-1990s television series Murder One.

== Personal life ==
Benzali married Worcestershire potter Lynda Medwell in 1979 while acting in Great Britain. They were married six years.

Benzali and fiancée Kim Cattrall had a three year relationship. Benzali (then 51) and Cattrall broke up in 1997, just prior to her role in Sex and the City (1998–2004).

Benzali has been living in London and divides his time between England and the United States.

== Filmography ==
=== Film ===
Year	Title	Role	Notes
1983	Home Free All	Therapist	
1985	Insignificance	First Theatrical Agent	
1985	A View to a Kill	W.G. Howe	
1985	White Nights	Dr. Asher	
1986	Whoops Apocalypse	William Kubert (US Defense Secretary)	
1988	Messenger of Death	Chief Barney Doyle	
1989	Vietnam War Story: The Last Days	Adams	(segment "Dirty Work")
1991	En dag i oktober	Solomon Kublitz	
1992	The Distinguished Gentleman	'Skeeter' Warburton	
1997	Murder at 1600	Secret Service Agent Nick Spikings	
1997	The End of Violence	Brice Phelps	
1998	Heist	'Big Fats'	
1998	All the Little Animals	Bernard 'The Fat' De Winter	
1999	Suckers	Reggie	
1999	Her Married Lover	Detective Joe Lansing	
2000	Screwed	Detective Tom Dewey	
2001	Vegas, City of Dreams	Dr. Sigmund Stein	
2001	The Grey Zone	Simon Schlermer	
2002	Dead Heat	Frank Finnegan	
2007	If I Had Known I Was a Genius	Walter	

=== Television ===
Year	Title	Role	Notes
1987	Star Cops	Commander Griffin	1 Episode
1988	The Murder of Mary Phagen	Coroner	Television Film
1988	Crossbow	Mad Monk	1 Episode
1988–1993	L.A. Law	Donald T. Phillips	7 Episodes
1989	Beauty and the Beast	Edward	1 Episode
1989	Star Trek: The Next Generation	Surgeon	1 Episode
1990	One Life to Live	Judge	1 Episode
1990-2006	Law & Order	Various Roles	2 Episodes
1991	Matlock	Henry Mayfield	1 Episode
1992	The Last of His Tribe	Mr. Whitney	Television Film
1992	Afterburn	John Patterson	Television Film
1992	Citizen Cohn	Francis Joseph Spellman	Television Film
1993–2003	NYPD Blue	James Sinclair Esq.	13 Episodes
1994	One West Waikiki	Delacourt	1 Episode
1995	The X-Files	Colonel Wharton	1 Episode
1995-1996	Murder One	Ted Hoffman	Lead Role; 23 Episodes
1997	The Outer Limits	Graham Highfield	1 Episode
2001	Boss of Bosses	Bruce Mouw	Television Film
2001–2003	The Agency	Robert Quinn	36 Episodes
2002	The District	Robert Quinn	1 Episode
2007–2008	Jericho	Thomas Valente	6 Episodes
2009	Eli Stone	Emmet Bortz	1 Episode
2009	Lie To Me	Joseph Hollin	1 Episode
2010	Nip/Tuck	Dr. Griffin	1 Episode
2010-2011	General Hospital	Theo Hoffman	54 Episodes
2012	Californication	Larry	1 episode
2015	Agent X	David Williams	2 episodes
