= List of The Drew Carey Show episodes =

The following is a complete list of episodes for the television sitcom The Drew Carey Show, which first aired on ABC on September 13, 1995. Throughout the show's run, nine seasons were filmed, amassing 233 episodes, with the final airing on September 8, 2004. The sitcom follows assistant personnel director Drew Carey, in his romances and relationships with friends Lewis, Oswald, and Kate.

== Series overview ==
| Season | Episodes | Originally released | | Rank | Avg. rating (Note: In households; seasons 1 and 2)/ Avg. viewers (Note: In millions; seasons 3–9) |
| Season | Episodes | First released | Last released | Rank | Avg. rating/ Avg. viewers |
|---|---|---|---|---|---|
| 1 | 22 | September 13, 1995 | May 8, 1996 | #48 | 10.1 |
| 2 | 24 | September 18, 1996 | May 14, 1997 | #18 | 11.5 (Note: Tied with NBC Sunday Night Movie.) |
| 3 | 28 | September 23, 1997 | May 20, 1998 | #16 | 16.7 |
| 4 | 27 | September 23, 1998 | May 26, 1999 | #15 | 14.9 |
| 5 | 26 | September 22, 1999 | May 17, 2000 | #22 | 14.5 |
| 6 | 27 | October 4, 2000 | May 23, 2001 | #37 | 12.7 |
| 7 | 27 | September 26, 2001 | May 22, 2002 | #56 | 9.1 |
| 8 | 26 | September 9, 2002 | August 27, 2003 | #120 | 5.2 |
| 9 | 26 | June 2, 2004 | September 8, 2004 | #150 | 3.1 |

== Episodes ==
=== Season 1 (1995–96) ===
This season introduces Drew Carey as Assistant Director of Personnel at Winfred-Louder. His unseen but often heard boss is Mr. Bell (Kevin Pollak), who has an obnoxious assistant, Mimi Bobeck (Kathy Kinney), who often clashes with Drew. Drew spends much of his free time with friends Lewis (Ryan Stiles), Oswald (Diedrich Bader), and Kate (Christa Miller), and their favorite hangout is a bar called the Warsaw Tavern. Throughout the season, Drew has an on-again, off-again girlfriend, Lisa Robbins (Katy Selverstone), while Jay Clemens (Robert Torti) is Kate's boyfriend for the latter half of Season 1.

The theme music for the first season's opening credits consists of Drew Carey singing "Moon Over Parma".

| No. overall | No. in season | Title | Directed by | Written by | Original release date | Prod. code | Viewers (millions) |
|---|---|---|---|---|---|---|---|
| 1 | 1 | "Pilot" | Michael Lessac | Drew Carey & Bruce Helford | September 13, 1995 | 457095 | 15.1 |
Drew interviews a hostile Mimi for the cosmetics salesperson job at Winfred-Louder, and she accuses him of being sexist for rejecting her application. Meanwhile, Drew's best friend Kate, who has just lost her job, coerces him into hiring her, though he is reluctant to hire a friend.
| 2 | 2 | "Miss Right" | Sam Simon | Clay Graham | September 20, 1995 | 457501 | 15.7 |
Mr. Bell hires Mimi as his assistant to keep her from filing a complaint about Drew's 'harassment', and she vows to make Drew's life intolerable. Drew meets attractive job applicant Lisa, and the two quickly become friendly. However, once Lisa is hired, he is worried about dating her because Winfred-Louder's rules prohibit management from dating an employee. Meanwhile, Drew's neighbors cause trouble next door. This episode introduces Lisa Robbins (Katy Selverstone).
| 3 | 3 | "The Joining of Two Unlike Elements is a Mixture" | Sam Simon | Lona Williams | September 27, 1995 | 457503 | 14.3 |
Kate is depressed that most women she knows are married and she isn't, and the guys throw a fake marriage ceremony to cheer her up. While on the way back in the limo, Drew reveals to Kate that he had a crush on her during high school.
| 4 | 4 | "Nature Abhors a Vacuum" | Michael Lessac | Jeff Lowell | October 4, 1995 | 457502 | 15.6 |
Drew fires Suzie, an inept employee, only to find out she was Mr. Bell's mistress. Kate proposes her idea for a day spa to an impressed Mr. Bell, who wants to meet with her and Drew at the Warsaw to discuss it. However, Drew discovers he is only interested in making Kate his latest conquest.
| 5 | 5 | "No Two Things in Nature are Exactly Alike" | Steve Zuckerman | Bruce Helford & Drew Carey | October 18, 1995 | 457504 | 13.1 |
The guys confront Kate's intimidating ex-boyfriend Barry, who refuses to pick up his stuff and makes incessant phone calls to Kate at work. Drew attaches a cartoon to the bottom of a memo in the hopes of boosting company morale and is later obsessed to find out who the lone offended employee was who complained to Mr. Bell. It turns out to be Nora from Accounting who also ends up filing a lawsuit against Drew.
| 6 | 6 | "Drew Meets Lawyers" | Steve Zuckerman | Les Firestein | November 1, 1995 | 457505 | 14.7 |
Drew turns down Winfred-Louder's attorneys (Guest stars Penn and Teller) when they try to get him to settle the lawsuit by signing a waiver that absolves the store of any responsibility. Drew then hires a lawyer, who happens to be an insufferable ex-boyfriend of Kate's, but is left high and dry when he has to fire him for making passes at Kate.
| 7 | 7 | "Drew in Court" | Steve Zuckerman | Robert Borden | November 8, 1995 | 457506 | 14.0 |
Drew defends himself against Nora's lawsuit but isn't very successful. Nora cries on the stand to gain everyone's sympathy, and the outlook is pretty bleak for Drew. A stressed Drew loses it during an argument at the Warsaw, gets arrested for assault, and has to doubly defend himself. Much to his relief, the judge rules in his favor in Nora's case.
| 8 | 8 | "Lewis' Sister" | Steve Zuckerman | Robert Borden | November 15, 1995 | 457508 | 15.3 |
When Lewis' sister, Janet, drops by for a visit, Drew, who had a brief fling with her in high school, shows a renewed interest and proceeds to date her despite Lewis' reservations. However, when things don't go well, he needs to break up with Janet without incurring Lewis's wrath.
| 9 | 9 | "Drew and Mrs. Louder" | Sam Simon | Clay Graham | November 29, 1995 | 457507 | 14.9 |
Mrs. Louder, the elderly widow of the store's founder, offers Drew a job as her personal assistant, and Drew reluctantly accepts. Drew enjoys making connections within the corporate world and is now allowed to date Lisa as he is no longer part of management. However, he gets demoted to his old job after Mrs. Louder catches him and Lisa having a tryst in the restroom during the office Christmas party. Nan Martin's first appearance as Mrs. Louder.
| 10 | 10 | "Science Names Suck" | Sam Simon | Lona Williams & Les Firestein | December 6, 1995 | 457511 | 16.6 |
After Kate has a new boyfriend and has less time to spend with them, the guys try to cope without her. They run into an old buddy, Jay, at the Warsaw and start hanging out with him. When Kate returns after her breakup, she is furious at Jay for taking her place in the gang, but surprisingly, the pair begins dating. This episode introduces Jay Clemens (Robert Torti).
| 11 | 11 | "The Electron Doesn't Fall Far from the Nucleus" | Sam Simon | Story by : Les Firestein; Teleplay by : Jeff Lowell & Lona Williams | December 13, 1995 | 457512 | 12.8 |
Drew's dad George introduces Drew, Lewis, and Oswald to his club "The Wildebeests", hoping it will help Drew make contacts and land a better job. However, they all leave when they discover that many of the club members are bigots, and later Drew tells off his dad for being over-expectant of him.
| 12 | 12 | "Isomers Have Distinct Characteristics" | Gary Halvorson | Jeff Lowell & Clay Graham | December 20, 1995 | 457510 | 13.5 |
Winfred-Louder employees decide to go on strike a few weeks before Christmas. Drew sympathizes with their plight, but must hire temporary replacements to keep the store going, including Oswald as a replacement for Kate.
| 13 | 13 | "Drew and the Unstable Element" | Brian K. Roberts | Jane & Aaron Harnick | January 3, 1996 | 457513 | 15.5 |
Drew feels he is being stalked by Earl (David Cross), whom he has just fired from the store after discovering his history of volatile behavior, and it results in the rest of the gang playing pranks on a jumpy Drew. Later, when Earl does show up at Drew's house, he is nabbed by Chuck, the store security guard.
| 14 | 14 | "Drew and Mr. Bell's Nephew" | Dennis Erdman | Christy Snell | January 10, 1996 | 457509 | 15.6 |
Mr. Bell promises Drew a promotion in exchange for training his nephew Blaine, who turns out to be a lazy, nepotistic pest. Kate mistakenly sells an expensive perfume for much less than it is worth and turns to Drew for help. Meanwhile, Blaine becomes such a nuisance that Mimi and Drew form an unholy alliance to force him out of the store.
| 15 | 15 | "There is No Scientific Name for a Show About God" | Sam Simon | Story by : Robert Borden; Teleplay by : Lona Williams & Jeff Lowell | January 17, 1996 | 457514 | 15.9 |
Drew believes that it was divine intervention that kept him out of a car accident. He then recalls one of his childhood vows written down in an old family bible, that was to serve God, and attempts to fulfill it by becoming a minister at his church.
| 16 | 16 | "Drew's New Assistant" | Gerry Cohen | Robert Borden & Clay Graham | January 31, 1996 | 457515 | 15.2 |
Mr. Bell appoints Mimi as Drew's assistant so he can hire Suzie as his own assistant. The gang consoles Drew after Mimi bruises his leg in the office. The situation takes a disturbing turn when a horrified Drew discovers pictures that suggest Mimi is secretly in love with him.
| 17 | 17 | "The Front" | Steve Zuckerman | Bruce Rasmussen | February 7, 1996 | 457517 | 15.8 |
A furious Mrs. Louder forces Mr. Bell to fire Suzie after discovering their affair, and a revengeful Mr. Bell threatens to fire any member of management who is caught dating an employee. Drew and Lisa have to jump through hoops to keep seeing each other and avoid being caught, especially by an on-the-prowl Mimi. Guest: Tim Allen as himself.
| 18 | 18 | "Playing the Unified Field" | Brian K. Roberts | Les Firestein | February 14, 1996 | 457516 | 15.1 |
Drew wants to maintain his relationship with Lisa undercover, but an exasperated Lisa decides they both should start dating other people and proceeds to do so. Drew starts dating his hard-living hairdresser Sue, but finds her too tough to handle. Later, Lisa tells him of a way they can start seeing each other again. Guest: Jamie Lee Curtis.
| 19 | 19 | "The Atomic Cat Fight" | Sam Simon | Lona Williams | February 21, 1996 | 457518 | 14.9 |
Winfred-Louder wants Drew to hire someone to head the new Personal Shopper department, and Drew hits a big dilemma when both Kate and Lisa want the job and Mimi is in the race, too, backed by Mr. Bell.
| 20 | 20 | "Drew and Kate and Kate's Mom" | Brian K. Roberts | Jeff Lowell | February 28, 1996 | 457519 | 14.7 |
Kate tries to conceal from her mom that she is dating Jay, since she is always disapproving of her boyfriends. When the truth comes out, she has to make up for it by inviting Jay over for dinner at her mom's house. Just as Kate suspected, her mom worries that Jay is on the rebound and tries to convince Kate that Drew is the right man for her.
| 21 | 21 | "Drew Gets Motivated" | Gary Halvorson | Matt Miller & Barrie Nedler | May 1, 1996 | 457520 | 14.5 |
Inspired by a motivational speaker, Drew launches a commercial video as part of Winfred-Louder's new promotional campaign featuring a camel and a bull. The video is successful and earns him a promotion. His luck runs out when the animals are brought to the store for a personal appearance and they get loose and invade the boardroom.
| 22 | 22 | "Buzz Beer" | Gerry Cohen | Story by : Clay Graham; Teleplay by : Les Firestein & Robert Borden | May 8, 1996 | 457521 | 14.0 |
Rumors fly around that a Dutch company is about to take over Winfred-Louder. This episode also sees the creation of "Buzz Beer", a coffee-flavored beer, by Drew and the gang, and Mr. Bell is fired.

=== Season 2 (1996–97) ===
This season starts with Winfred-Louder in turmoil and Mr. Bell fired. The first few episodes see both Kate and Drew become single again, with Drew breaking up with Lisa Robbins (Katy Selverstone) and Jay Clemens (Robert Torti) breaking up with Kate before leaving for Minnesota.

The show's theme slowly changed from "Moon Over Parma" which was gradually phased out in favor of "Five O'Clock World" by The Vogues.

| No. overall | No. in season | Title | Directed by | Written by | Original release date | Prod. code | Viewers (millions) |
|---|---|---|---|---|---|---|---|
| 23 | 1 | "We'll Remember Always, Evaluation Day" | Brian K. Roberts | Les Firestein | September 18, 1996 | 465902 | 18.5 |
This episode starts with a full musical version of "Five O'Clock World" before the usual theme song "Moon Over Parma". With Drew in charge of evaluations, all the staff are sucking up to him. Lisa is on the verge of breaking up with Drew after she feels he always puts his work ahead of her.
| 24 | 2 | "Something Wick This Way Comes" | Brian K. Roberts | Clay Graham | September 25, 1996 | 465901 | 17.1 |
This episode marks the first appearance of Winfred-Louder's new Store Manager, Nigel Wick (Craig Ferguson). Drew protests when Wick decides to fire all the older employees. Lewis and Oswald try to fill a rush order for Buzz beer and it leads to neighborhood kids working at the brewery in Drew's garage.
| 25 | 3 | "Break It Up, Break It Up" | Brian K. Roberts | Lona Williams | October 2, 1996 | 465903 | 16.2 |
Jay Clemens breaks up with Kate and moves to Minnesota, while Drew and Lisa also break up after she moves in with him and they get to each other's nerves. Speedy's first episode.
| 26 | 4 | "The Bully You Know" | Gerry Cohen | Christy Snell | October 16, 1996 | 465905 | 16.41 |
The guys meet up with their former high-school bully, who is going through tough times, so Drew tries to help him out with a job at Winfred-Louder. Oswald and Lewis introduce Drew's new dog, Speedy, to the other dogs on the street. Guest: Norm Macdonald as Simon.
| 27 | 5 | "The Devil, You Say" | Sam Simon | Bruce Helford | October 30, 1996 | 465908 | 20.20 |
The guys help Kate out when she starts dating a guy, "The Devil", who takes his nickname a little bit too seriously. Guest: Grant Shaud as Jack.
| 28 | 6 | "The Day the Music Died" | Gerry Cohen | Robert Borden | November 6, 1996 | 465904 | 17.77 |
The guys find out their high school music teacher Ms. Blankenship has died, and a solemn Drew organizes the reformation of the school band for her memorial service and later reveals his "special" relationship with Ms. Blankenship to the gang.
| 29 | 7 | "What the Zoning Inspector Saw" | Sam Simon | Clay Graham | November 13, 1996 | 465907 | 19.84 |
Drew's zoning inspector girlfriend, Bonnie, threatens to shut his brewery in the garage and Buzz beer down, so the gang try to mobilize popular support to keep their product alive. Guest: Caroline Rhea as Bonnie.
| 30 | 8 | "Drew's the Other Man" | Brian K. Roberts | Robert Borden | November 20, 1996 | 465909 | 20.17 |
Drew plans a surprise rendezvous with Bonnie only to find out much to his dismay that Bonnie is married. Oswald makes a new friend at work and Lewis is jealous until the stranger's true intentions become clear. Guest: Caroline Rhea as Bonnie and Eric Roberts as Steve.
| 31 | 9 | "Mimi's Day Parade" | Gerry Cohen | Joey Gutierrez & Diane Burroughs | November 27, 1996 | 465910 | 17.01 |
Drew is placed in charge of Winfred-Louder's Thanksgiving day parade but needs to let Mimi sit in the first float to save the show. The last time Drew Carey's version of "Moon Over Parma" is played as theme song. Guests: David Lander as himself, Tom Bosley and Tammy Faye Bakker as Mr. and Mrs. Bobeck.
| 32 | 10 | "It's Your Party and I'll Crash If I Want To" | Gerry Cohen | Joey Gutierrez & Diane Burroughs | December 4, 1996 | 465906 | 17.72 |
Drew and Mimi crash a party thrown by a new store employee, to which they were the only ones apparently uninvited. Kate bleaches her hair to appeal to decent men. "Five O'Clock World" becomes theme song for the remainder of season 2. Guest: John Caponera as Dexter K. Roberts.
| 33 | 11 | "Lisa Gets Married" | Steve Zuckerman | Christy Snell & Les Firestein | December 18, 1996 | 465911 | 18.45 |
The return (and final appearance) of Lisa Robbins (Katy Selverstone) who is marrying a fellow store employee whom Drew, much to his predicament, has on his firing list for non-performance. Lewis and Oswald take up jobs as elves for Winfred-Louder but have constant tiffs with a drunken Santa.
| 34 | 12 | "They're Back" | Brian K. Roberts | Clay Graham & Robert Borden | January 8, 1997 | 465912 | 18.68 |
Drew's parents move in with him after losing their home in Florida and end up depriving him of any privacy. Later, Oswald and Lewis take Drew in when he can no longer stand to live with his parents. First appearance of Marion Ross as Beulah Carey.
| 35 | 13 | "Hello/Goodbye" | Gary Halvorson | Susan Garon | January 15, 1997 | 465915 | 18.41 |
After Drew squabbles with their landlord over conditions in the apartment, Lewis and Oswald get evicted and the guys are forced to move into Kate's. Lewis pretends to be rich to date a demanding woman.
| 36 | 14 | "Drewstock" | Steve Zuckerman | Christy Snell & Terry Mulroy | January 29, 1997 | 465917 | 18.47 |
Lewis and Oswald rent the place above the Warsaw. The gang decide to wind up Buzz beer and throw a party offering free beer to liquidate the left-over inventory. Kate finds some new girlfriends who turn out be doppelgängers of the guys. Guests: Little Richard, Michael R. White, Bernie Kosar, Joe Walsh, and Lisa Thornhill as Beth.
| 37 | 15 | "Drew Blows His Promotion" | Sam Simon | Robert Borden, Susan Dickes & Christy Snell | February 5, 1997 | 465914 | 18.24 |
Kate plays a prank on Drew by adding "special" sounds to a copy of the video tape Drew had made for his promotion campaign, but it turns out to be the actual tape and Drew plays it to his embarrassment at the Winfred-Louder board meeting.
| 38 | 16 | "Check Out Drew's Old Flame" | Gerry Cohen | Susan Dickes | February 12, 1997 | 465916 | 18.60 |
Drew encounters and falls for Kyra, an "ex-high school friend" who turns out to be a con artist and it leads to Drew's car being repossessed and his furniture stolen. The gang try to help out Kate with her monetary problems.
| 39 | 17 | "See Drew Run" | Sam Simon | Lona Williams | February 19, 1997 | 465913 | 18.10 |
Drew decides to go on a hunger strike to force Winfred-Louder to build a skywalk to the parking garage after Oswald and Lewis get run over on a busy intersection while visiting Drew at the store.
| 40 | 18 | "Drew Gets Married" | Sam Simon | Robert Borden | February 26, 1997 | 465920 | 17.48 |
A drunken Drew gets fortuitously married to a woman, Diane, on a trip to Vegas and he agrees to play as her husband briefly so she can win custody of her two children.
| 41 | 19 | "Man's Best Same Sex Companion" | Robert Borden | Joey Gutierrez & Diane Burroughs | March 5, 1997 | 465918 | 17.57 |
After exploiting Winfred-Louder's same-sex insurance benefits for his dog Speedy's surgery, Drew enlists Oswald to pretend to be his companion in front of the store board to save his job.
| 42 | 20 | "Two Drews and the Queen of Poland Walk into a Bar" | Gary Halvorson | Lona Williams | March 19, 1997 | 465919 | 16.81 |
The gang support Drew when crazy Earl (David Cross) is let out of the mental institution and moves next door to Drew. Mimi prepares to meet the King of Poland with the hopes of becoming queen.
| 43 | 21 | "Cap-Beer-Cino" | Sam Simon | Christy Snow & Terry Mulroy | April 2, 1997 | 465921 | 16.43 |
The gang have to deal with a ruthless rival to Buzz Beer, "Cap-beer-Cino", another coffee-flavored knock-off of Buzz Beer and the competition gets ugly after the Cap-beer-Cino makers sabotage the ice-cream truck that the guys bought for delivering Buzz Beer. Guests: Ed Begley Jr. as Dr. Chris Vanderkamp and Rachel Hunter as herself.
| 44 | 22 | "Drew vs. Mimi: Part 2" | Gerry Cohen | David Brownfield | April 30, 1997 | 465922 | 14.44 |
Drew, Mimi and Larry compete for a board position at the store. Drew gains an edge and impresses the management with some tips from a business book, but later Mimi hijacks the book from Drew. Guest: Bill Erwin as Mr. Bradbury.
| 45 | 23 | "Win a Date with Kate" | Steve Zuckerman | Joey Gutierrez & Diane Burroughs | May 7, 1997 | 465923 | 16.77 |
Kate isn't amused when the guys decide to give away a date with her as a promotion for Buzz Beer and Mr. Wick finds the winning bottle cap. Drew gets nervous when Mr. Wick and Kate become 'romantically involved' as he worries that they will eventually break up and take out their anger on him. Originally broadcast in 3D.
| 46 | 24 | "New York and Queens" | Brian K. Roberts | Terry Mulroy and Christy Snell | May 14, 1997 | 465924 | 17.12 |
Drew and the gang take off on an impromptu trip to New York on their ice-cream truck to break the monotony of their lives. The episode ends with a dance-off over The Rocky Horror Picture Show vs. The Adventures of Priscilla, Queen of the Desert. Guests: Donald Trump, Carol Channing as herself, and Nicholas Turturro as Detective James Martinez from NYPD Blue.

=== Season 3 (1997–98) ===
The main story arc of this season is Kate and Oswald's relationship, which starts with them getting together in secret early on in the season, before they start going out leading up to the wedding at the end of the season. For much of the season, realtor Nicki Fifer (Kate Walsh) is Drew's girlfriend, and as the season progress, the more bad habits she picks up from Drew. Drew's brother, Steve Carey (John Carroll Lynch) is introduced, and revealed to be a cross dresser. Nan Martin has a recurring role as Winfred-Louder owner, Mrs. Fran Louder who is having an affair with Larry Almada (Ian Gomez).

The theme song for the first two episodes is "Five O'Clock World", with "Cleveland Rocks" replacing it from the third episode "Strange Bedfellows".

This season also introduces the "What's Wrong with This Episode?" series, in which viewers are asked to track down the mistakes made during the course of the episode, which airs on the same week as April Fool's Day.

| No. overall | No. in season | Title | Directed by | Written by | Original release date | Prod. code | Viewers (millions) |
|---|---|---|---|---|---|---|---|
| 47 | 1 | "Drew vs. Billboard" | Gerry Cohen | Les Firestein | September 24, 1997 | 466252 | 13.91 |
After being slighted by his boss Wick for not being fit, Drew embarks on a mission to lose weight but gets tricked by a con man who uses a topless picture of Drew on a huge billboard to advertise "Vita Beer", a weight loss scam.
| 48 | 2 | "Drew and the Singles Union" | Gerry Cohen | Robert Borden | October 1, 1997 | 466251 | 15.20 |
This episode has an extended introductory dream sequence where everyone is an alien. As a gag, the old animated show title appears, with an alien version of Drew singing "Moon Over Parma" but with the lyrics changed to the name of the alien planet. A savage storm threatens Cleveland, and when Winfred-Louder employees with families are preferentially allowed to leave early, Drew tries to start a single employees union in protest. Kate and Oswald kiss. A dazed Wick is taken by Mimi to her home after the storm.
| 49 | 3 | "Strange Bedfellows" | Gerry Cohen | Clay Graham | October 8, 1997 | 466253 | 20.75 |
This episode has an extended introductory theme of "Cleveland Rocks", sung by The Presidents of the United States of America, which became the theme for the rest of the show's run. The first appearance of realtor, Nicki Fifer (Kate Walsh) who takes advantage of "nice guy" Drew. Kate and Oswald secretly are seeing each other on a regular basis. Drew and Mimi are shocked to discover that Larry Almada is having an affair with Mrs. Louder. Includes an uncredited appearance by Cleveland personalities "Big Chuck" Schodowski and "Lil' John" Rinaldi in "Cleveland Rocks".
| 50 | 4 | "Misery Loves Mimi" | Sam Simon | Lona Williams | October 15, 1997 | 466254 | 17.40 |
Drew starts dating realtor Nicki after previous repeated attempts had failed. Mr. Wick is recuperating with Mimi and Larry is still staying with Drew. Mimi uses Wicks signature to run the store and fire Drew, who goes to her apartment to free Wick. Just as Nicki agrees to go out with Drew, Kate and Oswald reveal their secret and the house is raided by the police.
| 51 | 5 | "A Very, Very, Very Fine House" | Gerry Cohen | Diane Burroughs & Joey Gutierrez | October 22, 1997 | 466255 | 17.16 |
Drew's house is being seized and auctioned off as proceeds of crime, despite Drew being found innocent of any involvement in Larry's drug dealing. Drew comes to terms with Kate and Oswald being together.
| 52 | 6 | "Drew vs. the Pig" | Steve Zuckerman | Bob Nickman | October 29, 1997 | 466259 | 16.19 |
Nicki tells Drew she was once fat and wants to avoid any culinary temptations, and supports Drew when he decides to lose weight. Mimi, however, is convinced that Nicki never was fat and is trying to trick Drew into losing weight and bets him that he can't stick to the diet. The gang run a Buzz Beer promotion at the local Expo, where Lewis becomes Beer Boy.
| 53 | 7 | "Batmobile" | Sam Simon | Bruce Helford | November 5, 1997 | 466257 | 17.02 |
Drew wins a contest and has a choice of either $200,000 or the Batmobile, and to the other's disgust Drew chooses the Batmobile. Drew is forced to surrender the vehicle after he and Nicki 'defiled' it.
| 54 | 8 | "The Dog and Pony Show" | Steve Zuckerman | Story by : Deborah Oppenheimer; Teleplay by : Robert Borden | November 12, 1997 | 466258 | 19.49 |
Nigel Wick agrees to mind Mrs. Louder's dog. The plan goes awry and Drew has Lucky fixed and shorn, which to Wick's horror means they will be fired. To raise the money to buy a replacement the gang do "The Full Monty" at the Warsaw. Larry gets out of jail and agrees to help them, but the tavern is raided.
| 55 | 9 | "Drew's Brother" | Gerry Cohen | Story by : Scott Gordon; Teleplay by : Christy Snell | November 19, 1997 | 466261 | 18.49 |
Drew's brother Steve has lost his job and moves in with Drew. Kate then convinces him to hire Steve for a job at Winfred-Louder, but Drew is shocked to learn that his brother is a cross dresser. Drew then has to save Steve's job. The first appearance of John Carroll Lynch as Steve Carey. Guest: Dionne Warwick.
| 56 | 10 | "That Thing You Don't" | Gerry Cohen | Bruce Rasmussen | November 26, 1997 | 466256 | 15.79 |
Drew, Lewis and Oswald decide to reform the Horn Dogs, their old high school band, to compete in a battle of the bands competition at the Warsaw Tavern. Unfortunately, Kate also wants to be in the band although she can't sing, and there is a rival band from the high school days, The Underprivileged (special appearance by The Reverend Horton Heat), led by Herb. Guest: Seth Green as the Emcee and Drake Bell as the Blues Kid.
| 57 | 11 | "Volunteer" | Sam Simon | Terry Mulroy | December 3, 1997 | 466260 | 17.48 |
Drew agrees to volunteer at a local nursing home which has a bad reputation, and Wick then decides to run with the idea and make a mandatory program of employees volunteering for the nursing home. Mrs. Louder wants Drew to hire a replacement for Larry, but Drew has bigger problems with the nursing home residents framing him, but a deal is struck to save Drew and get Larry back to work. Guest: Tim Conway.
| 58 | 12 | "Vacation" | Gerry Cohen | Les Firestein | December 17, 1997 | 466263 | 18.89 |
Drew and Kate are equal winners of the Winfred-Louder Christmas competition, which has a prize for a free trip to the Bahamas. Drew is worried that he can't share a room with Kate without something happening. Lewis lets slip to Oswald that Drew has feelings for Kate, so he jumps on a plane to follow the others. Kate meanwhile reveals to Drew that she is not sure whether Oswald is the one.
| 59 | 13 | "Howdy Neighbor" | Richard Schwadel | Diane Burroughs & Joey Gutierrez | January 7, 1998 | 466262 | 18.82 |
The gang are drinking and the Buzz Beer tank explodes showering their neighbors house in beer, with Drew's neighbor Greg becoming his new boss at Buzz Beer after he pays for a new tank. Lewis starts dating Pinky (Ashley Gardner), a co-worker at DrugCo who is a test subject for experimental drugs.
| 60 | 14 | "He Harassed Me, He Harassed Me Not" | Sam Simon | Lona Williams | January 14, 1998 | 466264 | 17.21 |
Wick thinks that the Board are going to fire him and so he plots with Mimi to scam the board out of money by devising a sexual harassment lawsuit. The scam goes wrong when Mimi is offended by Wick liking his acting PA more than Mimi.
| 61 | 15 | "Mr. Louder's Birthday Party" | Sam Simon | Robert Borden & Christy Snell | January 28, 1998 | 466265 | 15.80 |
Drew has to give a speech at the annual event thrown by Mrs. Louder (Nan Martin) in honor of her late husband, but ends up offending Nicki. Mimi hires a sexual harassment lawyer in her lawsuit. Guest: Steve Buscemi as Mr. Marchetti.
| 62 | 16 | "The Salon" | Gerry Cohen | Bob Nickman & Terry Mulroy | February 4, 1998 | 466266 | 16.40 |
There is a fashion buyers job vacant at Winfred-Louder and Kate and Mimi both want it. To help Kate, Drew hosts a "Salon" party to allow Kate to show off her skills to Mrs. Louder (and Lewis to show off to his boss). However, it ends badly as Kate ends up fighting with Mrs. Louder and Drew's neighbors Greg (Keith Diamond) and Janet (Rachel True) end up storming out. Guests: Rush Limbaugh and Charles Nelson Reilly as Lewis's boss.
| 63 | 17 | "The Engagement" | Brian K. Roberts | Bruce Rasmussen | February 11, 1998 | 466267 | 17.17 |
Drew tries to get Mr. Wick to pass a lie detector test, but it ends up a disaster with Mimi easily beating the machine and Wick failing dismally. With Oswald angry with Drew, they end up taking secret compatibility tests with Kate and Nicki. Oswald proposes to Kate and Drew proposes to Nicki (Kate Walsh). Guests: Eugene Levy as Dr. Rider and Ashley Gardner as Pinky, Lewis' girlfriend.
| 64 | 18 | "Nicki's Parents" | Sam Simon | Matilda Hokinson | February 18, 1998 | 466268 | 14.80 |
Kate and Oswald have pre-marriage counselling, with Kate angry that Oswald spends so much time with Lewis. With Nicki away, Drew has dinner alone with Nicki's parents Chuck and Charlene Fifer, but the night does not go well, with the couple having a huge fight. Drew and the others show Mr. Fifer what the single life is like.
| 65 | 19 | "Two Weddings and a Funeral for a Refrigerator" | Brian K. Roberts | Christy Snell & Terry Mulroy | February 25, 1998 | 466270 | 17.09 |
Drew's fridge breaks down and the gang is very upset. Drew decides that he has to compete in the Winfred-Louder Employee Games, where a fridge is the main prize. However, Mimi and Larry pair up and are determined to win, and Lewis's girlfriend Pinky (Ashley Gardner) goes crazy making it hard for Drew to win. Guests: Kiana Tom as Tia.
| 66 | 20 | "The Bachelor Party" | Brian K. Roberts | Clay Graham | March 4, 1998 | 466269 | 20.48 |
The gang are throwing a Bachelor Party for both Drew and Oswald before their respective weddings. Before the bachelor party, however, Nicki dumps Drew. Drew's brother, Steve, comes out to their parents, George and Beulah as a cross dresser.
| 67 | 21 | "The Sex Drug" | Gerry Cohen | Les Firestein | March 11, 1998 | 466271 | 17.35 |
Mimi's sexual harassment lawsuit goes to court, but Drew proves to be an unreliable witness when he turns up to court under the influence of a sex drug (from Lewis's work DrugCo) that he had taken inadvertently. Nigel Wick apologizes to Mimi and tries to convince her to return to work and abandon the scam.
| 68 | 22 | "What's Wrong with This Episode?" | Gerry Cohen | Michael C. McCarthy | March 18, 1998 | 466273 | 17.78 |
One of Wick's firings goes wrong and he is shot in the crotch with a crossbow. This means Drew has to run the store in the meantime and he promises no firings which has unintended results. This episode is part of a competition for viewers to spot onscreen errors and win prizes. Guest: Robert Hegyes as himself.
| 69 | 23 | "The Rebound" | Gerry Cohen | Bob Nickman & Christy Snell | April 1, 1998 | 466272 | 16.69 |
This episode has the first appearance of handy woman Sharon Bridges (Jenica Bergere), who became a regular guest star for the later part of Season 4. Drew meets a good looking handy-woman when she fixes several appliances broken during a party to celebrate Drew paying off the engagement ring he bought for former fiancé, Nicki. Guest: Ashley Gardner's last appearance as Pinky, Lewis' girlfriend.
| 70 | 24 | "The Dating Consultant" | Gerry Cohen | Story by : Keith Young & Karen S. Brown; Teleplay by : Clay Graham & Bruce Rasmussen | April 22, 1998 | 466274 | 12.90 |
Oswald is moving out from the unit above the Warsaw Tavern to be with Kate, so Lewis needs to get a new housemate. Drew meets a dating consultant who he pays to give him some tips.
| 71 | 25 | "Drew's Cousin" | Gerry Cohen | Story by : Terry Mulroy; Teleplay by : Matt Ember & Katherine Green | April 29, 1998 | 466277 | 14.71 |
Drew's teenage cousin, Kristen, stays with him till she can find room in her college dorm. Drew gets her a temp job at the store but is appalled when she starts dating Mr. Wick. Guest: Nikki Cox as Kristen.
| 72 | 26 | "From the Earth to the Moon" | Gerry Cohen | Terry Mulroy & Christy Snell | May 6, 1998 | 466278 | 13.64 |
Drew is offered a promotion by Mrs. Fran Louder to be in charge of hiring for the new stores in Europe. He must make it to the boardroom quickly to hold onto the promotion, but everybody is determined to get in the way.
| 73 | 27 | "The Wedding Dress" | Brian K. Roberts | Story by : Apryl Huntzinger; Teleplay by : Maria Espada & Jody Paul | May 13, 1998 | 466275 | 9.95 |
The gang tries to get Kate her favorite wedding dress at a big sale but fail. Drew then spends the money to buy her the wedding dress, attracting questions from Oswald. Rachel True's final appearance as Janet Clemens.
| 74 | 28 | "My Best Friend's Wedding" | Sam Simon and Gerry Cohen | Diane Burroughs & Joey Gutierrez | May 20, 1998 | 466276 | 13.68 |
Oswald and Kate are scheduled to marry in Drew's backyard, but she is having second thoughts and turns to Drew for help in breaking the bad news to Oswald. This episode has a special intro featuring Looney Tunes character Daffy Duck. Guest: Adrienne Barbeau as Kim Harvey and Joe Alaskey as Daffy Duck.

=== Season 4 (1998–99) ===
The season starts with Kate and Oswald back to being friends. After Drew uncovers a conspiracy in the opening episode, there is a four episode story arc where Drew starts up the Horn Dogs again and gains Darcy, a groupie girlfriend, and loses interest in Winfred-Louder. At the same time as his band gets an offer to be a permanent house band, Mr. Wick has to stand down for a while as Store Manager and goes into rehab for treatment with cocaine. Drew dates several different women early on (Darcy, Celia), but for the later part of the season he is seeing Sharon Bridges (Jenica Bergere). Mimi starts dating Drew's brother Steve, much to Drew's disgust. Nan Martin has a recurring role as Mrs. Louder.

| No. overall | No. in season | Title | Directed by | Written by | Original release date | Prod. code | Viewers (millions) |
|---|---|---|---|---|---|---|---|
| 75 | 1 | "Drew and the Conspiracy" | Gerry Cohen | Story by : Bob Underwood; Teleplay by : Jennifer Crittenden | September 23, 1998 | 467501 | 15.52 |
Drew finds out from Chuck that many of his mishaps have been arranged by a conspiracy of three co-workers who hate him. Lewis asks Mimi to test out a DrugCo makeup product that changes color along with the mood, a mood that turns red when she realizes her latest boyfriend is married.
| 76 | 2 | "In Ramada Da Vida" | Gerry Cohen | Clay Graham | September 30, 1998 | 467502 | 17.05 |
Episode has crazy intro showing repetitive actions at Winfred-Louder. Kate quits her job at Winfred-Louder. Drew starts up the Horn Dogs and become a house band. First appearance of Joe Walsh as Ed. Guests: Pauley Perrette as Darcy, a rock groupie who dates Drew and musicians such as Dave Mustaine, Slash, Joe Walsh, Roy Clark, Dusty Hill, Jimmy Fox, Jonny Lang (cameo), Rick Nielsen, Lisa Loeb, and Matthew Sweet.
| 77 | 3 | "Golden Boy" | Gerry Cohen | Bruce Rasmussen | October 7, 1998 | 467503 | 16.66 |
Drew and the Horn Dogs (although with Ed Joe Walsh and the James Gang) are still playing, and Darcy convinces Drew to dye his hair. Drew, Chuck and Larry find cocaine at work, and Mr. Wick who goes into rehab. Guest: Pauley Perrette as Darcy.
| 78 | 4 | "Drew Between the Rock and a Hard Place" | Sam Simon | Richard Day | October 14, 1998 | 467504 | 16.14 |
Wick is still in rehab and Drew turns down Wick's job to be with the band. Mimi's affair comes to a close when she is confronted by her boyfriend's wife. Larry is the new boss and makes budget cuts forcing the others to beg Drew to help. Drew quits the band and is replaced by Weird Al Yankovic. Guests: Pauley Perrette as Darcy, James Gang (Joe Walsh, Jim Fox, and Tom Kriss) do a special performance.
| 79 | 5 | "Sexual Perversity in Cleveland" | Gerry Cohen | Mike Larsen | October 21, 1998 | 467506 | 15.45 |
Drew gets dumped by Darcy when he shows her his real job. Drew and Mimi mistakenly fall for each other over the internet, while Oswald gets DrugCo. implants to get $10,000 for his mother. Brief last appearance by Pauley Perrette.
| 80 | 6 | "Cain and Mabel" | Gerry Cohen | Dan O'Keefe | October 28, 1998 | 467505 | 16.70 |
Drew and the others are annoyed when Steve Carey and his drag queen friends take over the Warsaw. Oswald is worried about his mother losing her business and finding out about the implants. Guest: Adrienne Barbeau as Kim Harvey, Oswald's mother.
| 81 | 7 | "Nicki's Wedding" | Gerry Cohen | Joey Gutierrez & Diane Burroughs | November 4, 1998 | 467507 | 16.71 |
Drew gets an invite for Nicki's wedding on a ship which he decides to attend despite the dissuasion of the rest of the gang and ends up making a fool out of himself. Meanwhile, Mr. Wick returns to work from rehab.
| 82 | 8 | "Drew's New Car" | Sam Simon | Terry Mulroy | November 11, 1998 | 467509 | 16.14 |
Oswald makes another $10,000 from the implants and pays back his old debts to the others. Oswald, Kate and Lewis use the money to buy a new car for Drew who is impressed but sells the car to help his friends back again. When they take offense, Drew needs to get the car back from Mimi who blackmails him to help her win the store's Employee of the year award.
| 83 | 9 | "The High Road to China" | Gerry Cohen | Katherine Green | November 18, 1998 | 467508 | 17.17 |
In retaliation for an elaborate prank played on her, Mimi drugs Drew and sends him to China, with no money or passport to get home.
| 84 | 10 | "Drew's Dance Party" | Gerry Cohen | Clay Graham | November 25, 1998 | 467537 | 15.30 |
A musical clip show/compilation episode of the various songs the gang has sung over the past few seasons.
| 85 | 11 | "Kate's Family" | Sam Simon | Richard Day | December 2, 1998 | 467510 | 13.18 |
Kate has an instant family and Drew takes up swimming to impress avid swimmer Sharon. Mimi is worried that Drew is out to get revenge for being sent to China. Guest: Neil Flynn as Scott Honey.
| 86 | 12 | "Drew Dates a Senior" | Gerry Cohen | Jennifer Crittenden | December 9, 1998 | 467511 | 16.09 |
Drew decides to attend night school to pursue his Masters Degree but ends up dating a much older woman, Celia. Mimi volunteers to organize a Christmas display window for the store. Guest: Shirley Jones as Celia.
| 87 | 13 | "Drew's Holiday Punch" | Gerry Cohen | Mike Larsen | December 16, 1998 | 467512 | 15.47 |
Drew and Celia are surprised by Drew's parents arriving unexpectedly for Christmas. Drew, though initially reluctant, later reveals his relationship with Celia to them. Meanwhile, the rest of the gang help Mimi with selling Christmas trees door to door. Guests: Shirley Jones as Celia, Danny Bonaduce as Chip, Celia's son.
| 88 | 14 | "A House Divided" | Gerry Cohen | Dan O'Keefe & Katherine Green | January 6, 1999 | 467513 | 18.10 |
Winfred-Louder is going to be the anchor tenant of a new shopping mall... to be located over Drew's house.
| 89 | 15 | "A House Reunited" | Steve Zuckerman | Dan O'Keefe & Jennifer Crittenden | January 13, 1999 | 467514 | 16.80 |
Winfred-Louder tries every dirty trick in the book to get Drew to move from his house, as he is the only holdout in the neighborhood. Guest: Shirley Jones as Celia.
| 90 | 16 | "Rats, Kate's Dating a Wrestler" | Steve Zuckerman | Terry Mulroy & Christy Snell | January 27, 1999 | 467515 | 16.48 |
Drew and the others hire The Disciplinarian (Triple H), a pro wrestler, as spokesman for Buzz Beer. The gang is split on approval when Kate starts going out with him.
| 91 | 17 | "Three Guys, a Girl and a B-Story" | Gerry Cohen | Jody Paul | February 3, 1999 | 467516 | 16.91 |
Drew, Lewis and Oswald all (unwittingly) ask out the same woman. Guest: Diane Farr as Tracy.
| 92 | 18 | "Boy Party/Girl Party" | Sam Simon | Terry Mulroy & Jennifer Crittenden | February 10, 1999 | 467517 | 16.34 |
Mimi hosts a party for the girls wherein Kate begs Mrs. Louder to rehire her, and Drew has a party for the Winfred-Louder models which is just a ruse to distract Lewis and Oswald so he can go out with Tracy. Guest: Diane Farr as Tracy.
| 93 | 19 | "Tracy Bowl" | Sam Simon | Robert Borden | February 17, 1999 | 467519 | 13.08 |
Drew, Lewis and Oswald compete for Tracy's love in Tracy Bowl 1. Guests: Diane Farr as Tracy, Bob Costas as himself, Kenny Mayne as himself, Lynn Swann as himself.
| 94 | 20 | "DrugCo" | Gerry Cohen | Diane Burroughs & Joey Gutierrez | February 24, 1999 | 467518 | 17.57 |
Speedy is diagnosed with cataracts and Lewis suggests he be taken to DrugCo for treatment, but afterwards the gang is forced to break into the place to retrieve the dog.
| 95 | 21 | "Steve and Mimi" | Gerry Cohen | Bruce Rasmussen | March 17, 1999 | 467520 | 14.05 |
Winfred-Louder is forced to fire staff, including Drew's brother Steve who then has to move in with Drew. To Drew's horror, Steve and Mimi start dating.
| 96 | 22 | "What's Wrong with this Episode? II" | Gerry Cohen | Clay Graham | March 31, 1999 | 467521 | 17.02 |
This episode is part of a competition to spot errors. Drew is suspicious that his mother Beulah (Marion Ross) has been cheating on his father George (Stanley Anderson).
| 97 | 23 | "She's Gotta Have It" | Tommy Thompson | Apryl Huntzinger | April 7, 1999 | 467522 | 14.10 |
Good looking handy woman Sharon Bridges breaks up with her boyfriend, and Drew finally achieves his dream, although things take a strange turn. Guest: Colin Mochrie as Eugene Anderson.
| 98 | 24 | "Good Vibrations" | Brian K. Roberts | Story by : Terry Mulroy; Teleplay by : Mike Larsen & Dan O'Keefe | May 5, 1999 | 467523 | 11.98 |
The gang play practical jokes on each other and Sharon wants to become one of the gang. Drew has to go with Mr. Wick to Chicago to give a presentation at a convention, and ends up being the victim of a humiliating practical joke and returns to Cleveland determined to get revenge on Mimi.
| 99 | 25 | "Do the Hustle" | Sam Simon | Maria Espada | May 12, 1999 | 467524 | 12.96 |
It is decided that Drew and Sharon will go on a double date with Steve and Mimi, but Drew and Mimi start fighting much to Steve and Sharon's disgust. Drew and Mimi then try to pretend to be friends, and end up forming a ten pin bowling team to hustle other bowlers.
| 100 | 26 | "Up on the Roof" | Gerry Cohen | Katherine Green | May 19, 1999 | 467525 | 12.40 |
Drew convinces Sharon to take on a larger job, and repair the roof of Oswald's mother Kim Harvey. Guest: Adrienne Barbeau as Kim Harvey, Oswald's mother.
| 101 | 27 | "Brotherhood of Man" | Gerry Cohen | Brian Scully | May 26, 1999 | 467526 | 12.62 |
Winfred-Louder's Dutch owners tell the staff that they have a month-long paid vacation while they renovate the store. Drew, however, has to stay behind and make sure all the wages are paid, but finds out there is a secret plot to blow up the store.

=== Season 5 (1999–2000) ===
This season sees Steve Carey and Mimi get engaged and later married and Drew and Kate fall in love.

| No. overall | No. in season | Title | Directed by | Written by | Original release date | Prod. code | Viewers (millions) |
|---|---|---|---|---|---|---|---|
| 102 | 1 | "Y2K, You're Okay" | Gerry Cohen | Joey Gutierrez & Diane Burroughs | September 22, 1999 | 225401 | 12.91 |
Drew and the others are convinced that the end of civilization is nigh and have Sharon build a bomb shelter for them, while Mimi has got a new Mini Mimi. Sharon is worried that Drew is in love with Kate. The closing credits contain a parody of the original Twilight Zone episode "Time Enough at Last", where Drew is left alone in the bomb shelter with his "literature", in this case pornographic magazines, after a nuclear explosion, only to have his glasses break in the same manner, whereupon he repeated the final line from Burgess Meredith.
| 103 | 2 | "Drew Goes to the Browns' Game" | Gerry Cohen | Robert Borden | September 29, 1999 | 225403 | 14.73 |
The Cleveland Browns have returned to the city and Drew and the others all want to go to the game. A suspicious Drew discovers Sharon has had a boyfriend all along and is crushed. Last appearance by Jenica Bergere as Sharon. Episode filmed at the August 21, 1999, preseason game at Cleveland Browns Stadium.
| 104 | 3 | "Drew and the Gang Law" | Gerry Cohen | Daniel O'Keefe | October 6, 1999 | 225402 | 13.77 |
Drew learns that Steve and Mimi are engaged and need to hold the ceremony at his house. Drew and the others are arrested and the judge deems them to be a gang and orders them not see one another anymore.
| 105 | 4 | "Drew's Reunion" | Gerry Cohen | Brian Scully | October 13, 1999 | 225404 | 13.97 |
It is their school reunion and the gang are determined to make their mark. Kate learns that Drew always loved her, while Lewis tricks Bo Derek into attending.
| 106 | 5 | "Drew's Physical" | Tommy Thompson | Linda Teverbaugh & Mike Teverbaugh | October 20, 1999 | 225405 | 14.70 |
Kate reveals to Lewis that she loves Drew but is forced to keep her feelings on hold after Winfred-Louder's therapist advises Drew to keep off relationships for a while due to his low 'self-esteem'.
| 107 | 6 | "Drew Tries to Kill Mimi" | Sam Simon | Terry Mulroy | October 27, 1999 | 225407 | 14.81 |
Drew vows to kill Mimi when she plays a practical joke on him that nearly gets him fired. Drew accidentally hits Mimi while driving through the parking garage and Mimi decides to press charges.
| 108 | 7 | "Red, White and Drew" | Gerry Cohen | Jana Hunter & Mitch Hunter | November 3, 1999 | 225408 | 14.46 |
Drew is angry that a pot hole in his street is left un-repaired and works to get a ballot initiative approved in the local elections.
| 109 | 8 | "Drew Live" | Gerry Cohen | Clay Graham | November 10, 1999 | 225410 | 19.17 |
This is a live theater-sports type show and features several cast members from Whose Line Is It Anyway?, Colin Mochrie as Eugene, Brad Sherwood as himself/host and Wayne Brady. Drew finds out that Kate loves him. The show was live for the Eastern/Central, Mountain, and Pacific time zones, for a total of three different live shows with the same script.
| 110 | 9 | "Drew Cam" | Sam Simon | Story by : Michael Becker; Teleplay by : Holly Hester | November 17, 1999 | 225406 | 17.66 |
Drew goes live on Winfred-Louder's website to promote their products. Kate cohosts with him for a while but is quickly replaced by Isabel, a cute Latina. Later Kate tells a stunned but ecstatically happy Drew that she loves him during the webcast.
| 111 | 10 | "Drew's Stomachache" | Gerry Cohen | Apryl Huntzinger | November 24, 1999 | 225409 | 17.21 |
Drew has a persisting stomachache caused by any mention of his upcoming date with Kate. Mimi learns that she needs to get a past brief marriage to rock star Eddie Money annulled before she can marry Steve. Guest: Eddie Money.
| 112 | 11 | "Steve and Mimi Get Married" | Sam Simon | Jody Paul | December 1, 1999 | 225411 | 14.02 |
Drew's mom Beulah and Uncle Alfred make it to town for Steve's wedding with Mimi. Steve accuses Drew of sabotaging the wedding after Drew makes a mistake on the order form for the wedding napkins, but forgets the dispute after they learn that Alfred has died. After a brief fiasco over Alfred's coffin, Steve and Mimi finally get married over the internet.
| 113 | 12 | "Drew and Kate's First Date" | Gerry Cohen | Jonathan Stark & Tracy Newman | December 15, 1999 | 225412 | 13.94 |
Nan Martin's last appearance as Mrs. Louder. Lewis and Oswald offer advice for Drew after his first date with Kate doesn't go quite as planned, then rush (slowly) to Drew's aid when their second date goes even worse.
| 114 | 13 | "Drew and the Racial Tension Play" | Sam Simon | Daniel O'Keefe | January 5, 2000 | 225413 | 12.58 |
Drew selects long-serving board member Arthur Crawford to speak at Winfred-Louder's centennial function. After Crawford outrages employees by making his own stereotypical speech, Drew promises to get Crawford to apologize or resign. Later he learns that Winfred-Louder's Dutch owners have sold the store to Mr. Soulard, an African-American. Guest: Mark Curry as Mr. Soulard
| 115 | 14 | "Kate Works for Drew" | Gerry Cohen | Jody Paul & Apryl Huntzinger | January 12, 2000 | 225414 | 21.40 |
Mr. Soulard advises Drew to hire an assistant for himself and Kate coerces him into hiring her. However, later he is forced to fire her after she quickly goes on a power trip and has the entire store at her mercy.
| 116 | 15 | "Mimi Moves In" | John Fuller | Jana Hunter & Mitch Hunter | February 2, 2000 | 225415 | 18.99 |
Mr. Soulard fires Mimi after she refuses to change her personal appearance, which Drew celebrates by doing flips around the office while playing "Ding-Dong, The Witch is Dead" from The Wizard of Oz on a boombox he has in his desk. Steve and Mimi plan to leave on their trailer and never return but after Drew loses their truck, they are stranded on Drew's yard. Drew can't bear Mimi around the house and he later realizes he can get Mimi's job back because she has a medical condition. He decides that he would rather have Mimi at his workplace than at his home.
| 117 | 16 | "Do Drew and Kate Have Sex?" | Sam Simon | Chris Bishop | February 9, 2000 | 225416 | 14.11 |
While Drew is shopping for a bed, Kate says she wants to have sex with him. The two decide to plan a "date" that weekend, but they end up ruining it for each other. They eventually have another "date," but when Drew walks back into the bedroom after putting on a condom, he trips over his dog Speedy and falls face first on the floor, spraining his penis in the process.
| 118 | 17 | "I Dishonestly Love You" | Gerry Cohen | Brian Scully | February 16, 2000 | 225417 | 13.01 |
While Drew has a sprained penis, Lewis and Oswald 'erection-proof' his house. Then they earn their title of 'The Love Buzzards', firstly by coming on to Drew's ex-girlfriend, Wendy, then by plotting a catfight between Wendy and Kate.
| 119 | 18 | "Drew Goes to Hell" | Gerry Cohen | Holly Hester | February 23, 2000 | 225418 | 13.36 |
When Mr. Soulard asks Drew to hire a new regional manager for Winfred-Louder, Mr. Wick and a hesitant Drew strike a deal to get themselves promoted. When the store rebuffs Mr. Wick and reassigns him to training while promoting Drew to store manager, an incensed Wick vows revenge on Drew.
| 120 | 19 | "What's Wrong with This Episode? III" | John Fuller | Mike Teverbaugh & Linda Teverbaugh | March 1, 2000 | 225419 | 19.09 |
Drew offers Lewis and Oswald jobs at his store to get them to agree to sell off Buzz beer. After the new buyer, Mr. Cooper arrives to pick up the stuff, the gang get poignant over their memories of Buzz beer and strike a deal with Mr. Cooper to retract the sale.
| 121 | 20 | "The Gang Stops Drinking" | Gerry Cohen | Terry Mulroy | March 22, 2000 | 225420 | 14.20 |
Kate gets a new job in a catering firm. The gang discovers Mimi has fed them a substance that makes them allergic to alcohol. Newly sober Lewis and Oswald start dating a couple of recovering alcoholics and are forced to make a hard choice when the effects of the anti-alcoholic substance wear off.
| 122 | 21 | "Oswald's Son" | Bob Koherr | Jana Hunter & Mitch Hunter | March 29, 2000 | 225422 | 14.56 |
Oswald is visited by a young man Robert Gates who claims to be his son from a high-school fling. When it appears Lewis could possibly be his father too, the duo get competitive over their fatherhood.
| 123 | 22 | "Mr. Wick Returns" | Gerry Cohen | Aaron Spiro | April 12, 2000 | 225421 | 13.33 |
Mr. Wick returns from his retraining to begin duty in the mail room and again vows revenge against Drew. After Mimi has Drew hogtied by a cowboy that delays him on a major sales day and gets him demoted, Drew and Mr. Wick ally to derail Mimi's plans to become the store manager.
| 124 | 23 | "Kate vs. Speedy" | Ryan Stiles | Christy Jacobs White | April 26, 2000 | 225426 | 12.05 |
Kate and Drew hit problems when she decides to sleep over at his house and she and his dog Speedy both seem to be battling for Drew's attention.
| 125 | 24 | "Beer Ball" | Sam Simon | Jody Paul | May 3, 2000 | 225424 | 20.28 |
After Mr. Wick refuses to let him on the company softball team, Drew decides to organize his own team and challenges Wick to a play-off. When Drew realizes Steve is playing for the other team, it stirs up an old rivalry with his brother.
| 126 | 25 | "Drew and Kate Boink" | Gerry Cohen | Robert Borden | May 10, 2000 | 225423 | 15.29 |
Drew tells Oswald and Lewis the good news that his penis has healed. After meeting her ex-boyfriends at the Warsaw, Kate tells Drew that she fears he may meet the same fate. Drew assures her with a big ballad and later consummate their relationship. Meanwhile, Steve and Mimi announce that Mimi is pregnant.
| 127 | 26 | "A Very Special Drew" | Gerry Cohen | Jerry Belson & Apryl Huntzinger | May 17, 2000 | 225425 | 16.04 |
In a facetious attempt at Emmy bait, the melodramatic storyline features the characters coping with illiteracy, kleptomania, obsessive compulsive disorder and a coma. Lewis, the only one unaffected, breaks the fourth wall with monologues lamenting his insensitivity.

=== Season 6 (2000–01) ===
For the first part of the season, Drew is engaged to Kate, but after they break up he has a sham marriage with Wick, while Steve and Mimi have a baby together.

The fourth and final installment of "What's Wrong with This Episode?" also airs in this season; beginning in 2009, it has become a recurring theme on April Fool's episodes of the real Drew Carey's game show, The Price Is Right (which he first started hosting in October 2007).

| No. overall | No. in season | Title | Directed by | Written by | Original release date | Prod. code | Viewers (millions) |
|---|---|---|---|---|---|---|---|
| 128 | 1 | "Drew Pops Something on Kate" | Gerry Cohen | Paul Lieberstein | October 4, 2000 | 226352 | 13.61 |
Drew buys a ring to propose to Kate, but then gets fired from Winfred-Louder. He attempts to find a new job; however, Mimi sabotages his efforts to find new work. After waking up from a hangover, Lewis's "blood"-splattered T-shirt leads him and Oswald to suspect he might've killed Drew or Kate while inebriated.
| 129 | 2 | "Be Drew to Your School" | Gerry Cohen | Robert Borden | October 11, 2000 | 226357 | 15.48 |
Drew and Kate declare they're engaged. Drew gets depressed over his life's failures and when the gang tries to cheer him up, they realize it could all be their own fault.
| 130 | 3 | "Drew's Inheritance" | Gerry Cohen | Jana Hunter & Mitch Hunter | October 18, 2000 | 226353 | 13.10 |
Drew works at a school cafeteria but quits after being caught with a beer. Drew and Kate plan a scam marriage to claim Drew's inheritance from his uncle but Lewis and Oswald blow it.
| 131 | 4 | "Mimi's a Partner" | Bob Koherr | Terry Mulroy | October 25, 2000 | 226355 | 14.55 |
A sizable chunk of Buzz beer money goes missing and the gang attempt to solve the mystery.
| 132 | 5 | "Drew Live II" | Gerry Cohen | Brian Scully | November 1, 2000 | 226360 | 15.29 |
Features Whose Line Is It Anyway? cast members and Jay Leno as Lewis' boss. Drew offers to place Oswald and Lewis through his employment agency at the 'Shenanigans' bar, but there is only one position open.
| 133 | 6 | "The Pregnancy Scare" | Sam Simon | Apryl Huntzinger | November 8, 2000 | 226356 | 16.73 |
The gang celebrate Drew's refusal to marry Mr. Wick in return for his job, then they misinterpret Kate's hints about her possible pregnancy. Special appearance by The Go-Go's, who also perform (audio only) the song "Cleveland Rocks" over the normal opening credits.
| 134 | 7 | "Drew and the Trail Scouts" | Gerry Cohen | Dan O'Keefe | November 15, 2000 | 226358 | 13.63 |
Drew agrees to a phony green card marriage with Mr. Wick in exchange for his old job.
| 135 | 8 | "Drew and Kate Become Friends" | Gerry Cohen | Mike Teverbaugh & Linda Teverbaugh | November 22, 2000 | 226359 | 15.03 |
Mr. Wick moves in with Drew temporarily to keep up appearances for INS. In his attempt to get over the breakup with Kate, Drew goes on a date with Jenny who turns out to be Mimi's cousin. On hearing the news, Kate races to Drew's house to stop them from sleeping together and almost ends up sleeping with Mr. Wick herself. After a brief charade, Drew and Kate decide to be friends again.
| 136 | 9 | "Drew Can't Carey a Tune" | Gerry Cohen | Mike Teverbaugh & Linda Teverbaugh | November 29, 2000 | 226351 | 14.93 |
Drew endeavors to get to into his new boss, Mr. Nichols' good books by attending his church. However, when he volunteers to sing at a church benefit event, things do not go smooth.
| 137 | 10 | "Buzzie Wuzzie Liked His Beer" | Gerry Cohen | Jody Paul | December 13, 2000 | 226361 | 13.21 |
Drew sets up a booth for Buzz Beer at a local beer convention to which Lewis and Oswald get their star attraction - Buzzie, a beer-drinking, truck-driving ex-circus bear from DrugCo. All goes well until a camera flash spooks the bear.
| 138 | 11 | "Fetal Attraction" | Tommy Thompson | Apryl Huntzinger | December 20, 2000 | 226364 | 14.61 |
A pregnant co-worker attempts to make Drew the father of her soon to be born child. Oswald and Lewis kidnap the Santa whom they work for as elves, when he treats them badly.
| 139 | 12 | "The Warsaw Closes" | Sam Simon | Jana Hunter & Mitch Hunter | January 10, 2001 | 226365 | 13.56 |
Lewis and Oswald strike a perilous money-making plan, dealing with venomous snakes. After the guys take a 'leak' on Mimi's yard, she gets 'The Warsaw' closed by complaining to the cops.
| 140 | 13 | "Oswald's Dad Returns" | Sam Simon | Brian Scully | January 17, 2001 | 226354 | 12.59 |
Oswald's longtime criminal father attempts to form a relationship after being released from prison. Later, Drew and Lewis tell him that his father is still scamming around people. Guest: Tom Poston as Roscoe Harvey, Oswald's father.
| 141 | 14 | "All Work and No Play" | Gerry Cohen | Spiro Skentzos | January 31, 2001 | 226366 | 13.35 |
After spending too much time with Mr. Wick, Oswald, Lewis and Kate pick up British words and phrases whilst Drew feels left out. Later at the bar, they hear that Drew has been in an accident.
| 142 | 15 | "Drew's in a Coma" | Gerry Cohen | Les Firestein | February 7, 2001 | 226362 | 15.19 |
Drew entertains himself inside his head living in a fantasy world, while his friends try to revive him from a coma. After they pull the plug on him, he takes a 'heavenly test' and finds he is eligible to either go to heaven or back to living. Guest: Ben Stein as Heavenly Guide.
| 143 | 16 | "Drew and the Baby" | Bob Koherr | Daniel O'Keefe | February 14, 2001 | 226363 | 17.56 |
The gang take a comatose Drew's body home. En route to heaven, Drew meets his baby nephew who is about to be born and they trade places so that Drew can convince the baby of his reasons to be born. Drew is shown as a baby for a while and later he realizes he wants to live as well and wakes out of his coma. Guest: Jon Polito as The Baby.
| 144 | 17 | "Hush Little Baby" | Sam Simon | Chris Bishop | February 21, 2001 | 226367 | 9.86 |
When Steve falls sick, a reluctant Drew has to stay with Mimi to help her with the baby who won't stop crying unless Drew is around. Lewis has a bad cold and feels he is about to die and begins to break the rules. Things get weirder when he enters the bar naked and prances around.
| 145 | 18 | "Drew's Life After Death" | Shelley Jensen | Judy Paul | February 28, 2001 | 226368 | 11.05 |
Drew finds Mimi has fabricated his 'death' using a death certificate from the doctor when he was in a coma. Lewis and Oswald encash his life insurance policy and use the money to splash out on electric wheelchairs and men to carry them around. After volunteering at a crisis center, a depressed Drew decides to be a risk-taker and returns with a motorcycle.
| 146 | 19 | "Drew and the Motorcycle" | Gerry Cohen | Paul Lieberstein | March 14, 2001 | 226369 | 10.38 |
Lewis and Oswald are busy spending the insurance money from Drew's 'death', but get nervous when Drew pretends to be Kyle, Drew's bike-riding brother and starts dating the insurance company's cute agent. The scam is finally exposed and Drew is forced to sell off his motorcycle to pay back the money.
| 147 | 20 | "Kate and Her New Boyfriend" | Bob Koherr | Les Firestein | March 21, 2001 | 226371 | 12.17 |
Steve orders Drew and Mimi to call a truce as their hostility could be a bad influence on the baby. Kate's new boyfriend Eric stirs Drew's jealousy.
| 148 | 21 | "What's Wrong with This Episode? IV" | Sam Simon | Terry Mulroy | March 28, 2001 | 226370 | 12.17 |
Drew and Oswald make a video of Lewis to convince him that he is mean and evil. The video makes Lewis turn over a new leaf and become ultra-religious, much to the annoyance of everyone else. Guests: Gary Coleman, Kim Fields, Meshach Taylor, Thea Vidale, and Jimmie Walker as Drew, Kate, Oswald, Mimi, and Lewis's double in a scene.
| 149 | 22 | "The Easter Show" | Gerry Cohen | Story by : Brian Scully; Teleplay by : Mike Teverbaugh & Linda Teverbaugh | April 11, 2001 | 226372 | 12.04 |
Drew employs Oswald to deliver chocolate baskets on Easter morning. All goes well until he gets greedy and spoils all the chocolate. Meanwhile, Lewis meets the girl of his dreams but accidentally erases her number.
| 150 | 23 | "Christening" | Gerry Cohen | Story by : Jana Hunter & Mitch Hunter; Teleplay by : Terry Mulroy | May 2, 2001 | 226375 | 9.53 |
Drew competes with Mimi's rich cousin, Vanessa, to be the guardian of Steve and Mimi's child but his chances are derailed when he is asked to babysit King Gus before his christening ceremony and Lewis and Oswald make off with the baby, so they can take 'family' portraits at Winfred-Louder's new studio. Guest: Kathie Lee Gifford as Vanessa.
| 151 | 24 | "Drew and the Activist: Part 1" | Sam Simon | Dan O'Keefe & Paul Lieberstein | May 9, 2001 | 226373 | 8.66 |
Drew starts dating a social activist, Rachel Murray (Illeana Douglas), who is trying to blow the whistle on one of DrugCo's secretive projects and Lewis suspects Drew is passing on information to her.
| 152 | 25 | "Drew and the Activist: Part 2" | Gerry Cohen | Christy Jacobs White | May 16, 2001 | 226374 | 8.81 |
The guys and Mimi decide to throw a barbecue party to bar-owners to promote Buzz-beer. Mimi, Oswald and Lewis buy a sack of meat for the barbecue, but disagreement brews when Drew insists on serving just veggie-burgers, on Rachel's prodding. Guest: Illeana Douglas as Rachel Murray.
| 153 | 26 | "Bananas: Parts I & II" | Gerry Cohen | Story by : Jody Paul; Teleplay by : Adam Faberman & Kristen Marvin (part 1) | May 23, 2001 | 226376 | 8.55 |
| 154 | 27 | "Bananas: Parts I & II" | Gerry Cohen | Holly Hester & Apryl Huntzinger (part 2) | May 23, 2001 | 226377 | 9.51 |
Drew is made manager of the new Winfred-Louder women's store, but the pressure starts to get to him. Lewis and Oswald get jobs at Fred's Fireworks, resulting in firecrackers getting lit in Drew's house and Lewis' eyebrows getting blown off. When Drew goes missing, the gang try to piece together what happened from clues in Drew's back yard. Oswald and Lewis find out he's in a mental institution and check themselves in and hatch an escape plan for Drew.

=== Season 7 (2001–02) ===
Drew marries Nicki but Kate admits her love for him very shortly after, leading him to marry her as well. Both women find out about it, leading them to angrily dump Drew, who must deal with his lingering romantic feelings for Kate. Winfred-Louder is once again sold, this time purchased by British businessman Lord Mercer (Jim Piddock), who places his teenage daughter Milan (Jessica Cauffiel) in charge while making Drew co-manager with Mr. Wick. Lewis and Oswald build a house in the park while the latter takes steps to become a nurse. This season also features the last live episode.

| No. overall | No. in season | Title | Directed by | Written by | Original release date | Prod. code | Viewers (millions) |
|---|---|---|---|---|---|---|---|
| 155 | 1 | "Drew Carey's Back-to-School Rock 'n' Roll Comedy Hour: Parts 1 & 2" | Gerry Cohen | Dave Caplan, Jana Hunter, Mitch Hunter, Julie Ann Larson, Sam Simon, Terry Mulroy, Bruce Helford, Drew Carey, Clay Graham, Bruce Rasmussen, Les Firestein, Mike Teverbaugh, Linda Teverbaugh & Daniel O'Keefe | September 26, 2001 | 227301 | 10.03 |
| 156 | 2 | "Drew Carey's Back-to-School Rock 'n' Roll Comedy Hour: Parts 1 & 2" | Gerry Cohen | Dave Caplan, Jana Hunter, Mitch Hunter, Julie Ann Larson, Sam Simon, Terry Mulroy, Bruce Helford, Drew Carey, Clay Graham, Bruce Rasmussen, Les Firestein, Mike Teverbaugh, Linda Teverbaugh & Daniel O'Keefe | September 26, 2001 | 227302 | 10.03 |
This episode was recorded in the style of a sketch show. Teenage Drew visits a doctor and learns about his 'changing body'. Lewis and Oswald show SheDaisy their talents as backup singers. Kate and Jenny make out during a sleepover and are upset at the guys gawking at them. Drew hosts a film about the dangers of cooties. Mimi bothers Uncle Kracker for help with a crossword puzzle. Oswald the cop goes undercover in a high school in a terrible disguise. Guests: Jenny McCarthy, Amanda Bynes, SHeDAISY, Roz Witt as Fifty-Year-Old Woman, Helen Slayton-Hughes as Eighty-Year-Old Woman, Smash Mouth, Uncle Kracker, The Peter Frampton Band (Peter Frampton, Chad Cromwell, Bob Mayo, John Regan), Sugar Ray.
| 157 | 3 | "Drew Gets Out of the Nuthouse" | Gerry Cohen | Bruce Rasmussen | October 3, 2001 | 227304 | 10.10 |
The return of Drew's old girlfriend, Nicki Fifer (Kate Walsh). Drew returns home from the mental institution, but goes missing after bumping into Nicki at the bar. While Drew is gone, Kate confesses her love for Drew to the rest of the gang. Drew eventually shows up, married to Nicki.
| 158 | 4 | "Married to a Mob" | Gerry Cohen | Clay Graham | October 10, 2001 | 227303 | 11.10 |
Lewis and Oswald decide to buy a house after being convinced that they can't find a date because they live on top of a bar. Meanwhile Drew tells them he is married to both Kate and Nicki and asks them to keep the fact concealed to both women till he can tell them the truth himself.
| 159 | 5 | "When Wives Collide" | Bob Koherr | Dave Caplan | October 17, 2001 | 227305 | 11.37 |
Drew tells Lewis and Oswald that Kate is beginning to suspect that he may really be married to Nicki. Both women ultimately leave him when they realize Drew's bigamy. Lewis and Oswald attempt to build a house in the middle of a park.
| 160 | 6 | "Bus-ted" | Sam Simon | Les Firestein | October 24, 2001 | 227306 | 11.90 |
Nicki Fifer contacts the newspaper over Drew's bigamy leading to him being dubbed "The impotent, bisexual bigamist". Drew tries to make up with Kate by placing an ad on a bus, but the plan backfires. Guests: Motörhead, Bobby Bonds, and Jay Johnstone.
| 161 | 7 | "It's Halloween, Dummy" | Bob Koherr | Linda Teverbaugh & Mike Teverbaugh | October 31, 2001 | 227307 | 10.35 |
Drew fills some of his free time in a ventriloquism class. He organizes Winfred-Louder's charity Halloween party, wherein Kate shows up as herself, in a wedding dress with a fake knife on her back. Lewis winds up looking like Frankenstein's monster after a visit to a deranged dentist who works on a boat. After the store's new owner, Mr. Newsome tells Drew that he intends to promote him but then drops dead, Drew brings his body to the board meeting the next day and does his ventriloquism act. Guest: Henry Winkler as Mr. Newsome, new Winfred-Louder owner.
| 162 | 8 | "How Beulah Gets Her Groove Back" | Sam Simon | Daniel O'Keefe | November 7, 2001 | 227308 | 9.29 |
Drew's parents drop by for a two-week visit, but are soon on the verge of a split after Beulah confides to Mimi that George has never been good in bed. Oswald and Lewis build a battle-robot to win a competition at The Warsaw and raise money for their new house.
| 163 | 9 | "Drew Live III" | Gerry Cohen | Keith Blanchard | November 14, 2001 | 227311 | 10.46 |
Drew, Oswald, Lewis, Steve and Mimi take a train trip. Steve and Mimi are planning to have sex on the train. Later, Drew eventually turns up in a dog pound after being unconscious and is terrified to learn that he and Mimi may have mistakenly had sex. Guest Stars: Brad Sherwood as host; Charles Esten, Jeff B. Davis, and Greg Proops as the Stall For Time Players, Colin Mochrie as Eugene, John Ratzenberger as himself/various, and Blue Man Group.
| 164 | 10 | "Eat Drink Drew Women" | Gerry Cohen | Jana Hunter & Mitch Hunter | November 21, 2001 | 227309 | 8.52 |
New Winfred-Louder boss Christine Watson (Wanda Sykes) was brought in with a mandate to increase store efficiency and productivity or layoff staff while treating everyone harshly. She takes a liking to Drew, but after discovering a check in the pocket of his suit, she suspects the staff bribed Drew to sleep with her. Meanwhile, Lewis and Oswald unsuccessfully try to extend the lease on their apartment when it appears their new house won't be built in time for winter, but then a miracle comes in the form of the circus.
| 165 | 11 | "Mr. Laffoon's Wild Ride" | Gerry Cohen | Julie Ann Larson | November 28, 2001 | 227310 | 10.68 |
Oswald and Lewis mock the way Drew gets ordered around by his girlfriend Christine. The gang find out that Drew has been drag-racing with Mimi. Steve shows up with Gus to convince Mimi to stop racing. Christine learns why Drew has been racing, and agrees to be less demanding. Guests: Dee Snider and Jeff Gordon.
| 166 | 12 | "Hotel Drew" | Bob Koherr | Terry Mulroy | December 12, 2001 | 227312 | 8.43 |
After Mr. Wick announces a pay cut for all employees, Drew rents out a room to a gay couple, Mitch and Les (guests Adam West and Max Gail), who help Drew get a better job. When Drew is asked to cut the budget at the new company, he unintentionally shows that his position is unnecessary and gets fired. When asked to return to Winfred-Louder, Drew refuses, saying he will instead find a job he loves. Lewis and Oswald ask Mitch and Les to decorate their newly built house. Kate is unimpressed by their taste, but the guys love it.
| 167 | 13 | "Drew and the King" | Sam Simon | Dan O'Keefe | December 19, 2001 | 227313 | 9.58 |
After taking a job as a security guard, Drew requests a transfer to Kate's workplace (the Rock and Roll Hall of Fame) in an attempt to re-kindle their friendship. Later, Drew finds an unknown Elvis record, but gives Kate credit for the discovery and then makes a sacrifice after a mishap with the delicate relic. Guest: Micky Dolenz plays Kate's boss, Mr. Metcalf.
| 168 | 14 | "The Curse of the Mummy" | Thomas J. Thompson | Dave Caplan | January 16, 2002 | 227314 | 9.81 |
Oswald and Lewis make a video about themselves to impress women, but it doesn't have any effect whatsoever. The gang gets the wrong end of the stick when Drew tells of his encounter with Mr. Wick's mother, and Oswald reveals some disturbing feelings. Guest: Jon Polito as Stansfield.
| 169 | 15 | "The Enabler" | Gerry Cohen | Jana Hunter & Mitch Hunter | January 23, 2002 | 227315 | 8.97 |
Drew and Wick must convince a group of new buyers headed by Lord Mercer (Jim Piddock) to take over a sinking Winfred-Louder. The buyers are more impressed with Wick than Drew, but Drew needs to keep an alcoholic Wick glued to his addiction to seal the deal. Guest: Jon Polito as Stansfield.
| 170 | 16 | "Pretty Baby" | Gerry Cohen | Julie Ann Larson | February 6, 2002 | 227316 | 10.21 |
Lewis and Oswald enter a baby into Winfred-Louder's beautiful baby pageant to raise money to replace the heating ducts they broke. To get an edge over the other contestants, they try to teach the baby a talent which impresses the judges until they push it too far.
| 171 | 17 | "A Shot in the Dark" | Sam Simon | Christy Jacobs White | February 13, 2002 | 227317 | 8.25 |
Jenny McCarthy as Drew's girlfriend Officer Marlo Kelly. Lewis starts secretly sleeping in Drew's basement, so Oswald can have more private time with his girlfriend Colleen. Drew mistaking him to be his Policewoman ex-girlfriend, shoots him in the leg.
| 172 | 18 | "It's a Dog Eat Drew World" | Gerry Cohen | Ed Lee | February 20, 2002 | 227318 | 7.75 |
Drew is upset when Lewis, Oswald and Kate begin neglecting him to devote more time to their jobs. He lures them and Steve to his house by claiming an emergency. Meanwhile, his house is invaded by a pack of wild dogs forcing everyone to flee to the basement.
| 173 | 19 | "Bringing Up Boss" | Sam Simon | Daniel O'Keefe | February 27, 2002 | 227319 | 8.78 |
Lord Mercer announces that he is making his 19-year-old daughter, Milan (Jessica Cauffiel), the new store president and he forces Drew to mentor her. After she messes up a union negotiation, Drew enlists Kate to help Milan concentrate on her job. After Milan's boyfriend dumps her and she demotes Drew to work at the docks, Kate tries to get them back together. Guest: Dom Irrera as Stan and Jeff B. Davis as D'Artagnan.
| 174 | 20 | "Daddy Dearest" | Tommy Thompson | Jana Hunter & Mitch Hunter | March 13, 2002 | 227320 | 9.25 |
Lord Mercer refuses to entertain Milan's suicidal threats claiming she just wants to get attention. He later fires Milan, but Drew influenced by his own troubles with his father, convinces Lord Mercer to give Milan a second chance.
| 175 | 21 | "Never Been to Spain" | Sam Simon | Story by : Mike Teverbaugh & Linda Teverbaugh; Teleplay by : Adam Faberman | March 27, 2002 | 227321 | 9.78 |
Lewis and Oswald take up second jobs as airport security guards, whom Drew runs into on his way to Spain to partake in Milan Mercer's birthday party. Drew's plane makes a forced landing in Greenland where he has a tryst with a beautiful woman and her jealous husband.
| 176 | 22 | "O Brother, Who Art Thou?" | Gerry Cohen | Story by : Julie Ann Larson; Teleplay by : Vivien Mejia | April 3, 2002 | 227322 | 8.28 |
Drew is perplexed by Steve's angry outbursts towards others without any provocation. Kate figures out that Steve's behavior is the result of jealousy over Drew's professional success. Later Steve takes a job as a prison guard to deal with his hostility.
| 177 | 23 | "Rich Woman, Poor Man" | Shelley Jensen | Terry Mulroy | April 10, 2002 | 227323 | 8.95 |
The gang get to know Drew's rich girlfriend, Milan's mother, Lindsay Mercer (Julia Duffy), and introduce her to the 'poor' life. However, living without money is gets too much for her and she develops a rash that frightens Lewis and Oswald.
| 178 | 24 | "What Women Don't Want" | Bob Koherr | Dave Caplan | May 1, 2002 | 227324 | 7.92 |
Lewis has trouble finding a date for his old girlfriend's wedding. Drew and Oswald accompany him to a single's club event, where Lewis feels out of place initially but then partners up with the local janitor.
| 179 | 25 | "Look Mom, One Hand!" | Bob Koherr | Story by : Dan O'Keefe; Teleplay by : Kristen Marvin | May 8, 2002 | 227325 | 8.23 |
The guys' mothers come to town for a special Mother's Day brunch at the Warsaw. Kate introduces everyone to her new stepmother, who looks exactly like her. A website publishes a list of the biggest internet porn users in Cleveland and the moms are mortified to discover that Drew, Kate, Lewis, Oswald and Wick are on the list. They decide to move in with their kids to get their lives back on the right path and end up driving them crazy. Guest: Phyllis Diller as Grandma Bobeck.
| 180 | 26 | "The Eagle Has Landed" | Sam Simon | Julie Ann Larson | May 15, 2002 | 227327 | 8.22 |
A bald eagle making its home on Drew's roof enthuses the gang but things go awry when the bird flies away with Drew's date Kathy's little dog. Guest: Kathy Griffin as Kathy.
| 181 | 27 | "The Underpants Guy" | Bob Koherr | Mike Teverbaugh & Linda Teverbaugh | May 22, 2002 | 227326 | 7.77 |
The second return of Nicki Fifer (Kate Walsh). Winfred-Louder runs into financial troubles leaving Drew, Mimi and Wick on the sales floor where Drew has to sell underwear. The gang try to deduce why Nicki sent chocolate roses to Drew. Later, an obese and homeless Nicki drops by for an awkward visit and Drew allows her to stay with him.

=== Season 8 (2002–03) ===
In the fall of 2002, Winfred-Louder closed and the set became the office of online retailer Neverending Store. Drew, Mimi, and Nigel were hired (the latter as a janitor, but was written out of the series). Steve Carey was phased out as well. Kate O'Brien leaves the series after the second episode as she is marrying a fighter pilot and was quickly replaced with Kellie Newmark (Cynthia Watros), an old high school friend of Drew's who had been working as a stripper.

| No. overall | No. in season | Title | Directed by | Written by | Original release date | Prod. code | Viewers (millions) |
|---|---|---|---|---|---|---|---|
| 182 | 1 | "Revenge of the Doormat: Part 1" | Gerry Cohen | Mike Teverbaugh & Linda Teverbaugh | September 9, 2002 | 227951 | 7.60 |
The second return of Nicki Fifer (Kate Walsh). Drew struggles to find a job since Winfred-Louder went bankrupt. Lewis and Oswald take him to a strip club where they run into an old high school friend, Kellie. Drew goes to Neverending Store and gets a job, though he has no clue what it entails, and Kelly shows a talent for waitressing. Finally, Kate drops by with a bombshell.
| 183 | 2 | "Kate's Wedding: Part 2" | Gerry Cohen | Dave Caplan | September 16, 2002 | 227952 | 6.12 |
Kate introduces the gang to Kirk, a fighter pilot, whom she is about to marry. The guys try to find some dirt on Kirk so they can stop the wedding, but it is too late. After the wedding, the guys share a melancholic moment. The final appearance of Kate O'Brien (Christa Miller).
| 184 | 3 | "Eyes Wide Open" | Bob Koherr | Bruce Rasmussen | September 23, 2002 | 227953 | 5.91 |
Drew starts having bad dreams about Kate and begs Lewis and Oswald not to leave him alone. In a bid to help him, they decide to cheer Nicki up by taking her out so she'll move out of his house. Now over Kate, Drew decides to set a date to get married.
| 185 | 4 | "Drew and the Life-Size Jim Thome Cut-Out" | Bob Koherr | Dan O'Keefe | September 30, 2002 | 227955 | 5.87 |
Kellie attempts to be part of the gang, but Oswald and Lewis are not impressed after she breaks down to their personal insults. Drew wants to give her a second chance so they take her out for a night. In an effort to show she is as wild and crazy as them, she steals a cardboard cut-out of Jim Thome, but when the police get involved she panics.
| 186 | 5 | "Hickory Dickory...Double Date" | Sam Simon | Les Firestein | October 7, 2002 | 227954 | 4.49 |
Oswald feels incredibly guilty after hitting his mother in the face with a bowling ball, so he hires someone to come to his house and beat him up. Meanwhile, he tells Drew a secret about Kelly. Guests: Amy Farrington as Bonnie and Henry Rollins as Mr. Jericho, eBay Ass Kicking Guy.
| 187 | 6 | "Mama Told Me I Should Come" | Bob Koherr | Jana Hunter & Mitch Hunter | October 21, 2002 | 227956 | 4.82 |
Drew's new girlfriend has a queer habit that throws him off but his mom warns him of being too picky. Oswald's sudden psychic powers cause Mimi and Lewis to bet on the race track based on his prediction.
| 188 | 7 | "Family Affair" | Sam Simon | Julie Ann Larson | November 8, 2002 | 227957 | 5.89 |
The gang are planning to see a play, but after Drew gets home late and Steve says he has other plans with Mimi, they decide to see a movie instead. While there, Steve narrowly avoids being spotted by the gang with another woman. Guest: Suzanne Cryer as Karen and Jeannetta Arnette as Gloria.
| 189 | 8 | "Chemistry Schmemistry: Part 1" | Bob Koherr | Terry Mulroy | November 8, 2002 | 227959 | 5.90 |
Lewis causes a scene at a wedding where Drew is checking out music for his own ceremony. Later, his girlfriend, Robin (Lori Loughlin), proposes to him very early on in their relationship; Drew discusses it with the others who all offer different opinions. Guest: Goo Goo Dolls as Wedding Band and A.J. Langer as Dawn.
| 190 | 9 | "The Dawn Patrol: Part 2" | Sam Simon | Mike Teverbaugh & Linda Teverbaugh | November 15, 2002 | 227960 | 6.23 |
Oswald and Kellie have differing opinions on Drew's decision to dump his girlfriend, Robin, so he can date Dawn whom he met on the bus, but then they both agree it was a bad idea when it turns out Dawn (A.J. Langer) lets her ex-boyfriends hang around.
| 191 | 10 | "Drew's Girl Friday" | Tommy Thompson | Ed Lee | November 29, 2002 | 227958 | 5.36 |
Mimi throws Steve out of their home so he stays with Lewis and Oswald, who invite Mimi over to patch things up, ending up in a huge fight between Mimi and Steve. Guest: Lacey Chabert as Grace.
| 192 | 11 | "Drew Tries Hot Salsa" | Gerry Cohen | Dave Caplan | December 6, 2002 | 227962 | 4.89 |
Drew joins a salsa class to prep up his dance moves before his wedding. When Drew reveals he has feelings for Kellie to Lewis and Oswald, they advise him to bottle them up lest it may ruin his friendship with her. Later when Drew is about to confess to Kellie, they are interrupted by Kellie's ex-husband, Daryl (James Denton). Guest: Roselyn Sanchez as Maria.
| 193 | 12 | "The Man in the Iron Chair" | Gerry Cohen | Jana Hunter & Mitch Hunter | December 20, 2002 | 227963 | 5.05 |
Drew tries to keep Kellie away from Daryl, who is a wheelchair user after falling off Kellie's mom's roof. However, he ends up looking as though as he is trying to hurt Daryl, and pushes the two closer together. Drew later confesses his feelings to Kellie, but she no longer seems interested. Meanwhile, Lewis plans to build an underwater city but continually fails to invite women to it.
| 194 | 13 | "Drew Takes a Guilt Trip" | Gerry Cohen | Dan O'Keefe | January 10, 2003 | 227961 | 5.54 |
After Oswald fails his nursing school exam, Drew feels bad and helps him get a job at the web site. Oswald finds a way to nearly destroy the entire business and ends up being reassigned to a job that he is sort of familiar with - delivering packages.
| 195 | 14 | "Blecch Sunday" | Shelley Jensen | Ed Lee | January 24, 2003 | 227965 | 4.85 |
Drew lands a job in a commercial for Never Ending Store that will be broadcast live during the Super Bowl; however, he is reluctant to take it given his bad experiences in front of a camera. Lewis and Oswald keep him refreshed to stop him from passing out, but end up severely overstuffing him with snacks.
| 196 | 15 | "Turkeyspotting" | Bob Koherr | Adam Faberman | June 25, 2003 | 227968 | 7.08 |
Larry encourages Drew to lose weight before attending one of his singles mixers. Drew tries a little too hard by giving up food altogether, but his crash diet has some unintended side effects - temporary blackouts and hallucinations.
| 197 | 16 | "Suddenly No Summer" | Sam Simon | Les Firestein & Ed Lee | June 25, 2003 | 227974 | 7.13 |
Drew tries to improve his standing at work by taking a computer course over the summer. The gang tempts him into blowing it off to take a trip to Florida. Drew is wracked with guilt and his vacation, not surprisingly, turns out to be a wreck.
| 198 | 17 | "What's Love Got to Do With It?" | Sam Simon | Jana Hunter & Mitch Hunter | July 2, 2003 | 227969 | 5.68 |
The gang takes part in a karaoke contest. Drew tries to coach Kellie before her performance, but she gets so tired of his constant interference that she dumps him. Drew winds up having to take the stage with an 11-year-old girl as his partner.
| 199 | 18 | "Two Girls for Every Boy" | Tommy Thompson | Stacey Pulwer | July 2, 2003 | 227967 | 5.64 |
The boys meet a priest in the bar and Drew gets a date with his daughter Elaine, who he finds out is a lesbian. Drew manages to set up a threesome with Elaine and his new date Teri, but after he falls asleep due to an overdose of cold medicine, they make off with each other.
| 200 | 19 | "Two Days of the Condo" | Gerry Cohen | Dan O'Keefe | July 9, 2003 | 227966 | 6.97 |
Oswald and Lewis inform Drew of an offer of a free TV to newly married couples who stay at a condo, so he asks Kellie to pretend to be his wife for the weekend. At the condo, things turn amiss when the condo manager repeatedly hits on Kellie and Drew knocks him out.
| 201 | 20 | "Lewis You Can Drive My Car" | Sam Simon | Julie Ann Larson | July 9, 2003 | 227964 | 6.95 |
Drew gives Lewis his Christmas bonus, a used Rolls-Royce. However, the flashy car causes Lewis to undergo a strange personality transformation, and he can no longer be bothered to hang out with his longtime friends.
| 202 | 21 | "A Speedy Recovery" | Drew Carey | Kristen Marvin | July 16, 2003 | 227970 | 5.40 |
Drew finds an unexpected romance after he and Speedy get involved with an animal therapy program at a hospital. He agrees to loan Speedy to a dying woman, and sufficiently impresses the woman's granddaughter. He finds the relationship may not be worth it when he learns that he may never see Speedy again.
| 203 | 22 | "A Means to an End" | Shelley Jensen | John N. Huss | July 16, 2003 | 227971 | 5.66 |
Oswald and Lewis seek revenge against Drew after they discover that he gave away their Christmas gifts–handmade mugs–to a thrift store. Drew winds up getting an unscheduled colonoscopy from a Russian veterinarian.
| 204 | 23 | "Drew Answers the Belle" | Gerry Cohen | Dave Caplan | July 23, 2003 | 227972 | 5.94 |
Oswald and Lewis put Drew's picture and phone number on Buzz Beer bottles in the hopes of landing him a wife. Much to everyone's surprise, a southern belle named Lily (Tammy Lauren) responds to the campaign. Drew travels to Louisiana to meet the woman. They hit it off, and Drew believes he may have finally found his match.
| 205 | 24 | "What Screams May Come" | Gerry Cohen | Julie Ann Larson & Terry Mulroy | July 23, 2003 | 227973 | 6.74 |
Drew is left bruised and battered as Lily suffers from night terrors. He grows tired of the beatings, but is afraid to talk to her about her problem because he believes she would leave him.
| 206 | 25 | "Love is in the Air" | Drew Carey | Mike Teverbaugh & Linda Teverbaugh | August 20, 2003 | 227975 | 7.01 |
Drew decides to propose to Lily. Mimi hopes to secure Gus's admission into an exclusive prep school by setting up Kellie with the school's headmaster. Guest: Pat Finn as Mr. Delany.
| 207 | 26 | "The Bataan Wedding March" | Bob Koherr | Clay Graham | August 27, 2003 | 227976 | 7.84 |
As Drew prepares to marry Lily, his mother Beulah realizes that Kellie has strong feelings for Drew and believes Drew feels the same way about Kellie. Drew and Lily go through with the wedding, but the union proves to be a brief one when they realize that they really are not right for each other. Drew winds up sharing a dance with Kellie.

=== Season 9 (2004) ===
The last season was mainly focused on Kellie's evolving relationship with Drew from friend to girlfriend to being pregnant with his child. Mr. Wick makes a return for the last two episodes. Season 9 did not air in production order. The following list represents the order in which they were originally broadcast rather than the correct production order.

| No. overall | No. in season | Title | Directed by | Written by | Original release date | Viewers (millions) |
|---|---|---|---|---|---|---|
| 208 | 1 | "Drew Hunts Silver Fox" | Sam Simon | Russ Woody | June 2, 2004 | 5.93 |
Drew and Oswald get a little too competitive as they try to set up their mothers with an attractive eligible widower.
| 209 | 2 | "Eye of the Leopard" | Tommy Thompson | Adam Faberman | June 2, 2004 | 5.28 |
After learning that Gus's soccer team is in a league that has set things up to make sure that nobody ever loses, Drew tries to butt in, leading to disastrous results for his nephew. Lewis and Oswald may have blundered in getting involved with Kellie's cousin, who turns out to be a kleptomaniac. Guest: Scott Klace as Mr. Murphy.
| 210 | 3 | "Foos Rush In" | Tommy Thompson | Dean Young | June 9, 2004 | 4.06 |
After Evan leaves for a yoga retreat, Traylor begins a romance with Scott as part of a power play to seize control of the office. She ends the laid-back work environment and takes away the foosball table. Meanwhile, Lewis gets involved with the Warsaw's new cook.
| 211 | 4 | "Drew Thinks Inside the Box" | Brian K. Roberts | Dan O'Keefe | June 9, 2004 | 3.96 |
Drew is thrilled when he and Kellie decide to exchange keys. However, he nearly thwarts the progress in their relationship when he ends up letting Scott use Kelly's place to cheat on Traylor.
| 212 | 5 | "At Your Cervix" | Brian K. Roberts | Jana Hunter & Mitch Hunter | June 16, 2004 | 3.84 |
Drew hopes to make a commitment to Kellie after they learn that she is pregnant. However, she is unsure if this is the right decision. Drew seeks her parents' help to change her mind, only to find that they aren't thrilled with the idea of having him as their son-in-law. First appearances of Michael Gross and Susan Sullivan as Don and Annette Newmark, Kellie's parents.
| 213 | 6 | "Sealed in a Kiss" | Bob Koherr | Jana Hunter & Mitch Hunter | June 16, 2004 | 3.93 |
While taking a pregnancy quiz with Kellie, Drew recalls his father's death in a fall from the roof. Drew was horrified to discover that he was never even mentioned in his dad's diary, and tried to prove himself by arranging for a lavish military-style funeral. However, disaster struck when George accidentally wound up with a casket featuring the logo for the band Kiss.
| 214 | 7 | "Baby Makes Stress" | Shelley Jensen | Dean Young | June 23, 2004 | 4.34 |
Kellie is furious with Drew after he blows off an appointment to see their baby's first sonogram to go drinking with the guys.
| 215 | 8 | "Michigan J. Gus" | Sam Simon | John N. Huss | June 23, 2004 | 4.67 |
Kellie's fears about Drew's inability to be a good father grow after Gus suddenly begins misbehaving every time he is around his uncle. Inspired by Mimi's romance with a widower, Oswald and Lewis hope to set themselves for life by picking up wealthy widows.
| 216 | 9 | "No Booze for Drew" | Shelley Jensen | Jana Hunter & Mitch Hunter | June 30, 2004 | 4.66 |
As a sign of support, Drew pledges to stop drinking during Kellie's pregnancy, but soon finds keeping this promise very difficult. Meanwhile, Mimi has the hots for a handsome delivery man, and Oswald becomes part-owner of the Warsaw.
| 217 | 10 | "Drew's Best Friend" | Bob Koherr | Julie Ann Larson | June 30, 2004 | 4.99 |
Kellie tries to convince Drew to become friends with a new neighbor, but the man turns out to be a clingy pest who just will not leave Drew alone. Guest: French Stewart as Buddy.
| 218 | 11 | "Arrivederci, Italy" | Bob Koherr | Dan O'Keefe | July 7, 2004 | 4.78 |
Drew turns to a shady travel agent for help when he is unable to put together the funds to finance Kellie's dream vacation in Italy. Guest: Fred Willard as Fred Tuttle.
| 219 | 12 | "House of the Rising Son-in-Law" | Tommy Thompson | Ed Lee | July 7, 2004 | 5.14 |
Kellie tries to get Drew and her father to overcome their differences by having them work together to fix up an old house for sale. Mimi turns to Larry's matchmaking service in her quest for a new man. Guests: Kristen Wiig as Sandy, Michael Gross as Kellie's father
| 220 | 13 | "Dog Soup" | Sam Simon | Hugh Fink | July 14, 2004 | 4.61 |
Drew tries to make some extra money for the baby by betting on a greyhound that has been enhanced as part of a DrugCo project. Guest: David St. James as Owen.
| 221 | 14 | "Asleep at the Wheel" | Shelley Jensen | Dean Young | July 14, 2004 | 4.35 |
After bus-driver Tony gets into an accident, he pleads with Drew to lie for him since he is close to retirement and doesn't want to risk being fired and losing his benefits package. Fearing for the passengers' safety Drew is reluctant, so he tries to convince Scott to give Tony another job.
| 222 | 15 | "Baby Face" | Bob Koherr | Masha Tivyan | July 21, 2004 | 4.75 |
Drew has trouble getting romantic with a pregnant Kellie after an ultrasound-photo of the baby puts some very strange ideas into his head.
| 223 | 16 | "Girlfriend, Interrupted" | Bob Koherr | Dan O'Keefe | July 21, 2004 | 4.15 |
In the aftermath of his disastrous marriage, Drew heads off alone on his honeymoon to try to define his feelings for Kellie. Oswald and Lewis head to Mexico ahead of Drew, where Oswald accidentally falls for a hooker, unaware of her identity because he doesn't know how to speak Spanish.
| 224 | 17 | "Straight Eye for the Queer Guy" | Sam Simon | Julie Ann Larson | July 28, 2004 | 3.81 |
Mimi encourages Drew to make friends with the gay parents of Gus's friend. However, Drew winds up inadvertently splitting up the couple and finds himself as the"other man". Guests: Sean O'Bryan as Dean and Currie Graham as Russell.
| 225 | 18 | "Still Life with Freeloader" | Drew Carey | Kristen Marvin | July 28, 2004 | 3.43 |
Drew resorts to drastic action after Mimi's latest boyfriend moves into the house and begins mooching off him.
| 226 | 19 | "Burning Down the House" | Sam Simon | Mike Teverbaugh & Linda Teverbaugh | August 18, 2004 | 3.86 |
Mimi blames Drew after her house burns down, apparently as the result of a gift Drew gave Gus. Oswald starts a change-machine business.
| 227 | 20 | "Liar, Liar, House on Fire" | Drew Carey | Russ Woody | August 18, 2004 | 3.12 |
The gang tries to teach Gus to lie to an insurance adjuster so Mimi can receive the claim on her house and be able to replace it. Guest: Wayne Knight as Owen.
| 228 | 21 | "Sleeping with the Enemy" | Shelley Jensen | Ed Lee | August 25, 2004 | 3.65 |
Drew and Kellie's new relationship is threatened by their strong political differences.
| 229 | 22 | "Assault with a Lovely Weapon" | Shelley Jensen | Hugh Fink | August 25, 2004 | 3.36 |
Drew lies to Kellie about going out to a strip club, but the whole thing may come out after an injured Lewis decides to sue one of the dancers.
| 230 | 23 | "Love, Sri Lankan Style" | Bob Koherr | Russ Woody | September 1, 2004 | 4.98 |
Drew's plans to reunite Mimi with Steve and get her out of his house face a hitch: the appearance of a woman (Purva Bedi) Steve had an affair with in Sri Lanka. When Steve confesses to this, Mimi pours hot tea all over Steve's crotch and decides to go back to Larry.
| 231 | 24 | "Knot in the Mood" | Shelley Jensen | Dave Caplan | September 1, 2004 | 4.95 |
Drew reconsiders proposing to Kellie after her parents split up and her mother suddenly takes up with Lewis.
| 232 | 25 | "The Passion of the Wick" | Shelley Jensen | Ed Lee | September 8, 2004 | 5.14 |
Drew comes up with a plan to open a retro store, and seeks a partnership with the now-wealthy Wick. However, all of Wick's funds come through his father-in-law, so Drew must help cover up Wick's affair or lose his financial backing.
| 233 | 26 | "Finale" | Sam Simon | Story by : Clay Graham; Teleplay by : Bruce Helford & Dave Caplan | September 8, 2004 | 5.36 |
In the series finale, Kellie finally agrees to marry Drew, but their wedding plans are thrown into disarray when she goes into labor.

Based on production code and storyline, the correct order for season 9 is most likely the following:

| Episode # | Chrono- logical # | Title | Production Code |
|---|---|---|---|
| 16 | 1 | "Girlfriend, Interrupted" | #178551 |
| 6 | 2 | "Sealed in a Kiss" | #178552 |
| 19 | 3 | "Burning Down the House" | #178553 |
| 20 | 4 | "Liar, Liar, House on Fire" | #178554 |
| 3 | 5 | "Foos Rush In" | #178555 |
| 17 | 6 | "Straight Eye for the Queer Guy" | #178556 |
| 21 | 7 | "Sleeping with the Enemy" | #178557 |
| 22 | 8 | "Assault with a Lovely Weapon" | #178558 |
| 18 | 9 | "Still Life with Freeloader" | #178559 |
| 4 | 10 | "Drew Thinks Inside the Box" | #178560 |
| 2 | 11 | "Eye of the Leopard" | #178561 |
| 1 | 12 | "Drew Hunts Silver Fox" | #178562 |
| 5 | 13 | "At Your Cervix" | #178563 |
| 7 | 14 | "Baby Makes Stress" | #178564 |
| 9 | 15 | "No Booze for Drew" | #178565 |
| 8 | 16 | "Michigan J. Gus" | #178566 |
| 10 | 17 | "Drew's Best Friend" | #178567 |
| 11 | 18 | "Arrivederci, Italy" | #178568 |
| 12 | 19 | "House of the Rising Son-in-Law" | #178569 |
| 13 | 20 | "Dog Soup" | #178570 |
| 14 | 21 | "Asleep at the Wheel" | #178571 |
| 15 | 22 | "Baby Face" | #178573 |
| 23 | 23 | "Love, Sri Lankan Style" | #178574 |
| 24 | 24 | "Knot in the Mood" | #178572 |
| 25 | 25 | "The Passion of the Wick" | #178575 |
| 26 | 26 | "Finale" | #178576 |
