= Brotherhood of Man (disambiguation) =

Brotherhood of Man is a British pop music group.

It may also refer to:

- Brotherhood of Man (1945 film), a 1945 animated short film produced by UPA
- Brotherhood of Man (How to Succeed in Business Without Really Trying song)
- Brotherhood of Man (The Innocence Mission song)
- Brotherhood of Man (The Drew Carey Show), television episode
