= The Dog and Pony Show =

- The Drew Carey Show episode
- Episode no.: Season 3 Episode 8
- Directed by: Steve Zuckerman
- Story by: Deborah Oppenheimer
- Teleplay by: Robert Borden
- Production code: 466258
- Original air date: November 12, 1997

Guest appearances
- Mark Addy as Himself; Paul Barber as Himself; Steve Huison as Himself; Hugo Speer as Himself; Kate Walsh as Nicki Fifer; Stephen Tobolowsky as the Councilman; Ian Gomez as Larry Almada; Tim Haldeman as the Officer

Episode chronology
← Previous "Batmobile"	Next → "Drew's Brother"

"The Dog and Pony Show" (Note: A "Dog and pony show" is a colloquial term which has come to mean a highly promoted, often over-staged performance, presentation, or event designed to sway or convince opinion for political, or less often, commercial ends.) is the eighth episode of the third season of the American sitcom The Drew Carey Show, and the 54th overall. The series focuses on the work and home life of a fictionalized version of actor and comedian Drew Carey. The episode first aired on November 12, 1997 on ABC in the United States. The episode's plot sees Mr. Wick (Craig Ferguson) pass off caring for his boss Mrs. Lauder's (Nan Martin) Hungarian Puli to his employee Drew (Drew Carey). When Drew has the prize-winning dog shaved and neutered, he and his friends decide to perform a striptease at the local bar, The Warsaw Tavern, to earn quick cash to buy a replacement.

The episode was co-written by producers Robert Borden and Deborah Oppenheimer, while Steve Zuckerman directed. It was inspired by the British comedy film The Full Monty and Carey invited four of the film's cast members to appear in the episode. "The Dog and Pony Show" was shot on October 15, 1997 at the Warner Bros. Television studios in Burbank, California. The set was closed to the usual taping audience while the cast performed their striptease routine. "The Dog and Pony Show" was seen by an estimated 12.4 million viewing households, finishing in 15th place in the ratings for the week it aired. Critical response was mostly positive, with reporters praising the script and the striptease routine.

== Plot ==
When Mr. Wick is asked to look after Mrs. Lauder's prize-winning Hungarian Puli, he decides to pass the task on to his employee Drew. Kate O'Brien offers to take the dog, Lucky, to Drew's house; but she has to leave suddenly to pick up her boyfriend Oswald. Drew does not see Kate's note and assumes Lucky is a stray. He takes it to the vet to get it shaved and neutered. When Kate sees the dog, she fears that she, Drew and Mr. Wick will be fired. She finds an advertisement for a pure bred Hungarian Puli, but it costs $4,500. Since no one has that kind of money, Oswald suggests they sell their bodies for money. Inspired by The Full Monty, the guys decide to perform a striptease at The Warsaw Tavern to make the money they need. Lewis Kiniski backs out of the performance at the last minute, but Larry Almada steps in as his replacement.

With the bar full, the guys begin their routine, but are soon stopped by the police, who explain that due to zoning regulations, stripping is illegal at The Warsaw. Drew and the guys go before the city council, but their request is denied. Drew questions how the council can deny something without seeing it and the guys, including Lewis, decide to demonstrate their striptease routine before the council members. Their request is then approved. After performing the striptease at the bar, Drew counts out the money and finds that they have $4,800. Mr. Wick asks what they should do with the extra money and Drew replies that they should give it to the people that earned it. He then walks off stage and into the audience and starts handing out the extra cash, apologizing for them having seen his naked buttocks.

== Production ==
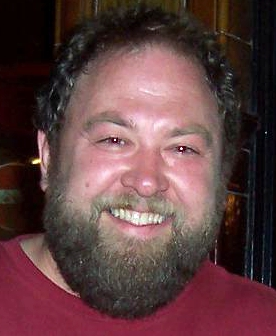
Mark Addy and three other Full Monty cast members appeared in the episode.

"The Dog and Pony Show" was co-written by producers Robert Borden and Deborah Oppenheimer, and directed by Steve Zuckerman. The episode was inspired by the British comedy film The Full Monty. Following its release in the United States, Drew Carey saw the film three times and loved it so much he invited the cast to appear in the episode, while they were promoting the film. However, Andrew Essex from Entertainment Weekly reported that cast members Mark Addy, Paul Barber, Steve Huison and Hugo Speer were not allowed to perform on the show after being stopped by the American immigration department because they did not have work permits. The cast members were instead billed as "guests of honor" due to Actors Equity rules preventing them from being paid for their cameo.

The episode was filmed at the Warner Bros. Television studios in Burbank, California on October 15, 1997. The set was closed to the usual taping audience when Carey, Bader, Ferguson, Gomez and Stiles performed their striptease to The Edgar Winter Group's "Free Ride". The Full Monty cast members came to the set to offer advice and watch the taping. The remainder of the episode was filmed before an audience later that same night. Gomez said that having two guys paint his body in make-up was "more embarrassing" than filming the routine, while Stiles joked that the episode was the first time he had been "totally naked" since he was cast in the show. Carey was grateful that stripping during prime-time had to be PG and apologized that viewers had to see his naked buttocks. He also clarified that the cast wore pouches to protect their modesty.

== Reception ==
In its original broadcast, "The Dog and Pony Show" finished 15th in the ratings for the week of November 10–16, 1997, with a Nielsen rating of 12.8, equivalent to approximately 12.4 million viewing households. It was the fourth highest-rated show on ABC that week, following episodes of Home Improvement, Monday Night Football and 20/20.

The episode received mostly positive attention from television critics. A reporter for the Los Angeles Daily News gave the episode a positive review calling it "meatier" than usual. The reporter thought the take on The Full Monty was "sharply silly" and said "Carey's striptease doesn't come till the show's end. The most we see is a full rear view – raw indeed but strategically blocked by microphones. But the bun fun, half-baked as it is, is exuberant and preceded by smarter writing than usual." The reporter called the characters "unlikely Chippendales" and added that Carey had one of the best scripts he had in a while, which mixed "understated humor with unself-conscious undress."

Alan Pergament, writing for The Buffalo News, awarded the episode 3 and a half stars out of five and said the episode "offers a delicious take on the surprise theatrical movie hit from England." Pergament thought there were too many penis jokes, especially for the show's time slot, but called the dance scenes "hysterically funny." The Spokesman-Review's John Martin stated that while he usually condemned the "cheap, tawdry use of nudity" to boost ratings, it was different with Carey and he thought the take on The Full Monty was "riotous" and "wild". Martin finished by saying "Carey may be the only comic in prime time who could pull this off, so to speak. You gotta love the big guy."

Lon Grahnke from the Chicago Sun-Times gave the episode three stars. The Chicago Tribune's Steve Johnson said the show was "working at its usual level" and called the homage to The Full Monty "uninspired". A reporter for The Age chose "The Dog and Pony Show" as one of the shows Melbourne would be talking about the week it aired in Australia. While The Sun-Herald's Rachel Browne awarded the episode four out of five stars and called it an "hilarious homage to The Full Monty". Browne was thankful that the gang's modesty was protected. James Joyce, writing for The Newcastle Herald, commented that the episode was "a crack-up." Joyce later branded the plot "contrived", but thought the end of the episode was "risque" and "suitably cheeky."
