= Sergey Kozlov (cinematographer) =

American cinematographer (born 1964)

Sergei Kozlov (born June 15, 1964 Moscow) is an American cinematographer. He graduated from VGIK Film School in 1989.

Sergei Kozlov was a Director of Cinematography on Bridge awarded by Academy of Television Arts and Sciences Frank O'Connor Memorial Award (North Hollywood, California), also known as College Emmy Award.

He has won two Nika Awards and was nominated for a prime-time Emmy Award for outstanding cinematography for the NBC miniseries Merlin.

== Selected filmography ==
- The Aryan Couple (2004)
- The Lion in Winter (2003)
- Jason and the Argonauts (2001)
- Merlin (1998)
- The Odyssey (1997)
- Bridge (1988)
