= Drew's in a Coma =

- The Drew Carey Show episode
- Episode no.: Season 6 Episode 15
- Directed by: Gerry Cohen
- Written by: Les Firestein
- Production code: 226362
- Original air date: February 7, 2001

Guest appearances
- Ben Stein as the Heavenly Guide; Joe Walsh as Ed; David Purdham as the Doctor; Michelle Ruben as Woman #1; Jamie Anderson as Woman #2; John Valdetero as Captain Marvel; Charles Brame as Lincoln; Patrick Gorman as Shakespeare; Charlie Stewart as the Little Boy; Melanie Gage as the Dancing Nurse; Nicholas Hill as the Karate Guy

Episode chronology
← Previous "All Work and No Play"	Next → "Drew and the Baby"

"Drew's in a Coma" is the fifteenth episode of the sixth season of the American sitcom The Drew Carey Show, and the 142nd overall. The plot of the episode sees Drew (Drew Carey) left in a coma after he is hit by a car. Drew entertains himself through a fantasy world he creates, while his friends try various things to get him to wake up. At the end of the episode, Drew chooses whether to go to heaven or not and his sister-in-law, Mimi (Kathy Kinney), goes into labor. The episode was written by Les Firestein and directed by Gerry Cohen. It first aired on February 7, 2001, on the ABC network in the United States.

The episode was the first of "a two-part event" that aired during the February sweeps. Drew's fantasy world featured special effects and appearances from historical figures, Ben Stein and Joe Walsh. The show's theme tune was temporarily replaced with "Girlfriend in a Coma" by The Smiths. "Drew's in a Coma" finishing in 26th place in the ratings for the week it aired. Critical response was mostly positive, with reporters calling the plot funny, strange and surreal. Editor John Fuller was recognised for his work on the episode with a Creative Arts Emmy Award nomination.

== Plot ==
As Drew runs for his bus, he suddenly finds himself flying above Cleveland. He encounters Captain Marvel, who invites him to a party, and a little boy who asks him to do somersaults. The scene then cuts to Drew's friends Kate, Lewis and Oswald standing by a comatose Drew's bedside. Oswald shakes Drew to wake him up, while Kate tries shouting and then talking to Drew. Drew's brother, Steve and his wife, Mimi, arrive and Mimi kisses Drew, but he still does not wake. While he is in his coma, Drew creates a fantasy world with beautiful women, a pizza tree and a beer fountain.

Mimi becomes Drew's slave and she turns on a television screen which shows Drew what is happening at the hospital. The doctor gives Drew an injection to wake him up, but it does not work, as Drew refuses to leave the coma because he is having fun. The doctor then suggests removing Drew from the respirator, so he will have to fight to come out of the coma or die. Drew's friends surround him with his favourite things, try talking to him again and Ed plays Drew's favourite song. Steve allows the doctor to remove Drew from the respirator and Drew's fantasy world disappears. A heavenly guide appears and tells Drew he has passed the test to get into heaven, but he must decide if he wants to go to now or go back to living. As Drew heads towards the light, Mimi goes into labor.

== Production ==
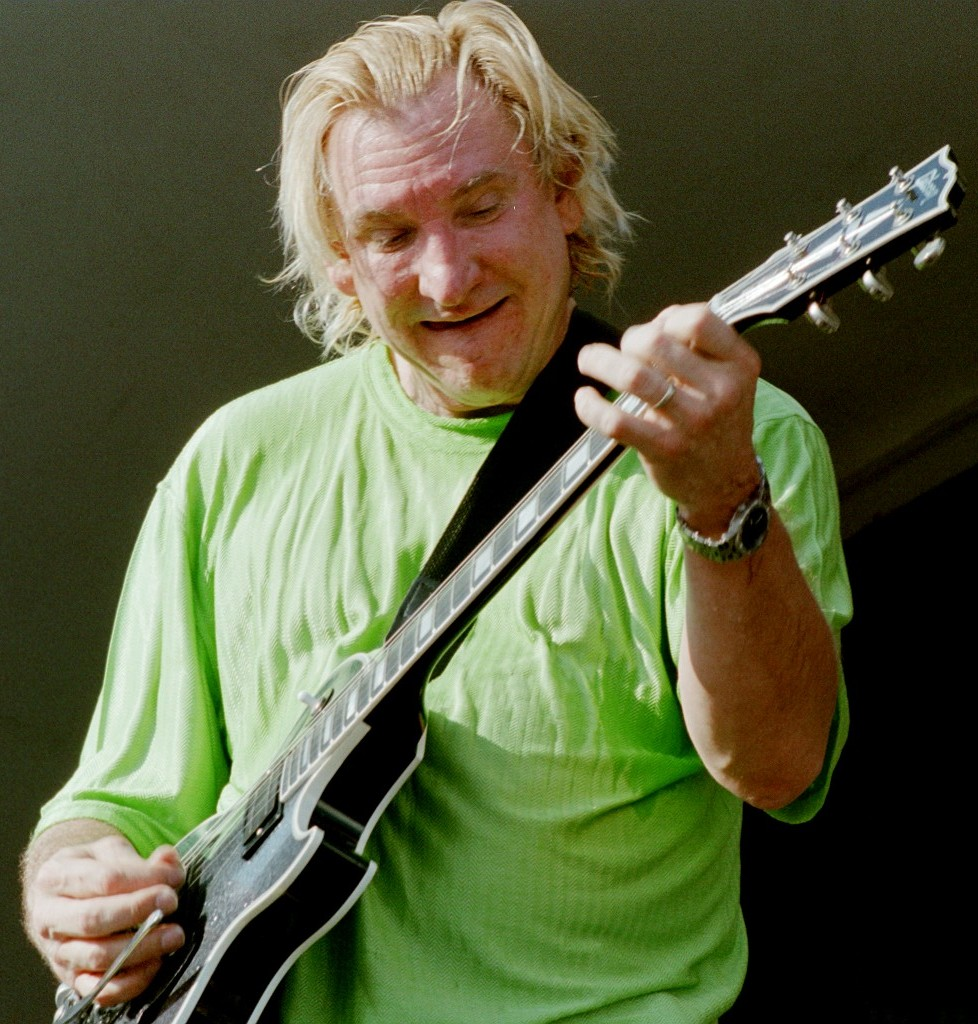
The episode featured an appearance by Joe Walsh.

In January 2001, Drew Carey told The Charleston Gazette's Ellen Gray that during the February sweeps, his character would be going into a coma, while Mimi Bobeck (Kathy Kinney) would give birth to Drew's nephew. Carey said Drew's coma would feature special effects and Dan Doran, a publicist for the show, added "When he slips into the coma, he kind of goes into this fantasy world where nothing goes wrong." Terry Morrow from the Daily News thought "Drew's in a Coma" had a simple concept compared to previous stunt episodes, which the show employed to keep things fresh. Carey said such episodes gave people "a reason to watch." The episode was the first of "a two-part event" and a story arc with long-running consequences for the character.

"Drew's in a Coma" was written by Les Firestein and directed by Gerry Cohen. The fantasy sequences see Drew fly above Cleveland, party with beautiful women, enjoy a "pizza tree and beer fountain" and play Trivial Pursuit with historical figures William Shakespeare and Abraham Lincoln. Meanwhile, his friends try to save him and the episode ends with a cliffhanger as Drew goes towards the light. However, Morrow wrote that there were no plans to kill Drew off, as Carey had another year to go on his contract. "Drew's in a Coma" featured guest appearances from actor Ben Stein and musician Joe Walsh. The show's regular theme tune was replaced with The Smiths' "Girlfriend in a Coma".

== Reception ==
In its original broadcast, "Drew's in a Coma" finished in 26th place in the ratings for the week of February 5–11, 2001. The episode had a Nielsen rating of 9.6, meaning that it was seen by 9.6% of the nation's estimated households. It was the third highest-rated show on ABC that week, following episodes of Who Wants to Be a Millionaire and The Practice.

The episode received mostly positive attention from critics. David Bianculli from the Daily News gave the episode three stars and claimed that placing Drew in a coma was "strange even by 'Carey' standards." However, Bianculli thought the situation was "quite funny" and used the concept with "gleeful abandon." Bianculli concluded that the show had made comas look more fun than they actually are and thought the rap song backed by a harp was a television first. A reporter for the Spartanburg Herald-Journal commented that the episode was funny, despite the premise sounding like it would not be. The reporter liked the sequence inside Drew's head, saying it "amounts to a truly surreal escapade." The Cincinnati Post's Rick Bird branded the episode "hilarious".

Joel Brown, writing for The Spokesman-Review, chose the episode as one of his highlights of the day, but the plot made him questioned what had happened to the show. Phil Rosenthal for the Chicago Sun-Times called the premise of the episode "over-the-top" and realised Drew would not die because of the light script. Ben Doherty from The Newcastle Herald enjoyed the episode, although he thought that it entered "pretty soppy territory" when Drew's friends gathered around his bedside to decide whether to pull the plug or not. Doherty added "Drew transports himself and us to a wonderful fantasy world not dissimilar to something Homer Simpson might dream up." The Herald Sun's Cameron Adams branded the sequences in Drew's head as "surreal" and called Mimi Drew's "colourful nemesis". His pick of the scenes was Kate's Eminem/harp song.

At the 53rd Creative Arts Emmy Awards, editor John Fuller earned a nomination for Outstanding Multi-Camera Picture Editing for his work on the episode.
