= Bridge (1988 film) =

The Bridge Project (including Bridge/MOCT and Bridging the Gap, a documentary)
- Directed by: Paolo Mazzucato; Boris Airapetian
- Written by: Paolo Mazzucato; Boris Airapetian
- Produced by: Robert Kath
- Starring: Vadim Stepashkin; Rhonda Muffley; Sasha Tcherbackov; Amanda Armato; Alexei P. Ustinov
- Cinematography: Sergei Kozlov; Stephan Perrault; Production Design: Sergey Mavrody; Eric Fitchter; Assistant Director: Robert Borden; Natasha Ivanova
- Music by: Vladimir Kopisov
- Release date: 27 November 1988 (limited)
- Running time: 7 minutes
- Countries: United States; Soviet Union
- Language: English
- Budget: $250,000

Bridge (Мост) is a musical film, the first USA/USSR student co-production.

== Introduction ==
Winner of a College Emmy from the Academy of Television Arts and Sciences and two CINE Eagle Awards from the Council on International Non-Theatrical Events in Washington, D.C., “The Bridge Project” is the ground-breaking student film that embraced Mikhail Gorbachev’s “Glasnost” and “Perestroika” in 1988 to become the first filmed collaboration between students in the United States and the former Soviet Union.

Shot on location in Moscow, Leningrad (now St. Petersburg) and Chicago, the project brought together young filmmakers who bridged the gap between their respective countries to express a message of hope and cooperation through their shared visual language of film.

The completed film premiered in Chicago in October 1988 and was later screened worldwide via satellite to American embassies during the May–June 1990 summit between then presidents George H.W. Bush and Mikhail Gorbachev.

== Plot ==
A young Soviet boy, confronted with the combative spirit of his grandfather, has a vision of a brighter future. Beyond the rigid wall of history, he imagines traveling to the United States to engage with the people and culture. Similarly, a young American girl dreams of dancing beyond the borders of her own country. As a young man and woman, the two might even meet and discover that they both have similar aspirations——to explore the world and join in a global community of friendship. Just as children join together in play, there is hope that we too can learn to embrace each other and see the common hope for peace that unites us all.

== Cast ==
- Vadim Stepashkin as Young Man
- Rhonda Muffley as Young Woman
- Sasha Tcherbackov as boy
- Amanda Armato as girl
- Alexei P. Ustinov as old man

== The Birth of an Idea ==
In July 1988, Robert Kath, Paolo Mazzucato and Stuart Merrill were invited to travel to Moscow, in what was, at the time, the Soviet Union. It had taken over a year of planning and preparation to find the proper channel of communication by which Kath’s proposal for a joint US/Soviet student film production could be delivered to a receptive authority within the U.S.S.R.

Lawrence Schiller, the producer of the television miniseries “Peter the Great” had enjoyed unprecedented access to locations in Russia during his production and had agreed to hand-deliver the proposal to Alexander Komshalov of Goskino, the Soviet State Film Agency.

Through Goskino, Kath’s idea was approved and passed on to Moscow’s All Union State Institute for Cinematography (V.G.I.K.) in Moscow which then extended the formal invitation by which the July trip was made possible.

The trip’s purpose was to negotiate the terms of “The Bridge Project,” envisioned as a cross-cultural exchange and film coproduction. The project would pair seven student filmmakers from Northwestern University in Evanston, Illinois, with their seven Soviet counterparts from V.G.I.K. to create a short film conceived, written, produced and edited by the students.

The students were: Robert Kath and Boris Gorbunov, producers; Paolo Mazzucato and Boris Airapetyan, directors; Stephan Perrault and Sergei Kozlov, cinematographers; Cindy Chastain, assistant cinematographer; Eric Fichtner and Sergey Mavrody, art directors; Robert Borden and Natasha Ivanova, assistant directors; H.D. Motyl and Misha Sychev, documentary cinematographers; and Stuart Merrill and Gelena Gutlina, translators.

While the logistics of the physical production were finalized, the two directors, Mazzucato and Airapetyan, dove into the process of creating a story and joint concept for the film. Producer Kath had secured rights to the song “Bridges of Trust” co-written by Russian composer, Vladimir Kopisov, and the U.S. Band, Collective Vision, during the 1987 Peace March from Leningrad to Moscow. The song became the framework for an idea that would explore the hope of a younger generation—the hope that two cultures, closed to each other for so many years, would learn to see and embrace both their differences and similarities, recognizing the common dream that we all have for a world of peace and friendship.

== Action! ==
Production began in September 1988, with three weeks of filming in Moscow and Leningrad (now St. Petersburg). Hosted by Tatiana Storchak, the lead administrator of V.G.I.K., the U.S. students were welcomed and immersed in Soviet culture. They were escorted to a wide range of locations, both simple and grand—from produce markets along the street, to backstage at the Bolshoi Theater and the courtyard of the Winter Palace of Peter the Great in Leningrad. They were encouraged to capture on film their own impressions of Russia with the same Glasnost, or “openness,” that made the dreams of the film’s characters a new and hopeful possibility.

A crew of students from V.G.I.K., eager to participate in the project, joined the core group of filmmakers and assisted in the Soviet portion of the shoot. Equipment from the school was supplemented with additional Arriflex motion picture cameras from a Moscow television studio, as well as some impressive “add ons” including a towering crane used to shoot the stunning Factory Worker & Collective Farmer statue in Moscow and a panoramic view overlooking Red Square.

The second phase of the shoot began in October, when the core group of Soviet student filmmakers was, in turn, hosted by their U.S. counterparts in Chicago. Producer Kath had secured corporate sponsorship for the U.S. portion of the project which included accommodations at the North Shore Hilton along with a variety of local restaurants. Additionally, Eastman Kodak, Sony Corporation, RiverNorth Recorders and Editel—Chicago, among others, provided the film and video products and services that had made the project itself possible.

Students from Northwestern University rounded out the U.S. crew and worked to make the second half of the project as successful as the first half had been. Location shooting, during the first two weeks, included a trip to the Chicago Board of Trade and a Lake Michigan cruise on the Star of Chicago.

== The Cutting Edge ==
The third week in Chicago was devoted to post-production. Using the brand-new Montage non-linear editing system at Editel-Chicago allowed directors Mazzucato and Airapetyan to assemble and fine-tune their collaborative effort on a tight schedule without having to compromise any creative exploration.

== Premiere ==
Then finally, on October 20, 1988, “Bridge/MOCT,” was screened at a premiere event at the LimeLight Club in downtown Chicago. The newly recorded version of the song “Bridges of Trust” featured soaring vocals by Jerry Jordan and Valentina along with a children’s chorus that contained all the hope that The Bridge Project itself had come to represent. Like the characters on the screen, the student filmmakers had ventured beyond their own, known borders. They reached for an idea that may have seemed unlikely, and together, they made that idea a reality.

The film was the first-ever US/Soviet student co-production and was eventually screened via-satellite at American embassies around the world during the May/June 1990 summit between then presidents George H.W. Bush and Mikhail Gorbachev.

== Awards and honors ==
- 1988, Academy of Television Arts and Sciences Frank O'Connor Memorial Award (North Hollywood, California) - currently known as College Emmy Award
- 1989, CINE Eagle Award (Washington, D.C.) - Winner
- 1989, Golden Reel Competition (International Television and Video Association) - finalist
- 1989, Chicago Music Video Contest (Chicago, Illinois) - 1st place
- 1989, Houston International Film and Video Competition, currently WorldFest Houston - Honorable Mention (Bridging The Gap, documentary)
- 1990, The IAC International Film/Video Festival (London, UK) - Silver Certificate
- 1990, The Badalona Film Festival (Badalona, Spain) - Special Mention of the Jury
- 1990, CINE Eagle Award (Washington, D.C.) - Winner (Bridging the Gap, documentary)
