= Thomas J. Thompson =

American television director

- Other name: Tommy Thompson
- Occupation: Television director
- Years active: 1981–present

Thomas J. Thompson (sometimes credited as Tommy Thompson) is an American television director.

Since the early 1980s, he has also worked as a key grip, camera coordinator, technical coordinator and associate director, for numerous television series. They include Cagney & Lacey, The War at Home, All of Us, Wanda at Large, Shake It Up and Austin & Ally.

As a television director, he has directed episodes of Dave's World, The Norm Show, The Drew Carey Show and Good Luck Charlie.
