= Brotherhood of Man (The Drew Carey Show) =

- The Drew Carey Show episode
- Episode no.: Season 4 Episode 27
- Directed by: Gerry Cohen
- Written by: Brian Scully
- Production code: 467526
- Original air date: May 26, 1999

Guest appearances
- Hal Linden as Mr. Van Zandt; Ron Roggé as Contractor; Johnnie Walker as Bernard; Jenica Bergere as Sharon Bridges

Episode chronology
← Previous "Up on the Roof"	Next → "Y2K, You're Okay"

"Brotherhood of Man" is the 27th episode of the fourth season of the American sitcom The Drew Carey Show. It also serves as the show's 100th episode and the season finale. The plot sees the staff of Winfred-Louder given a month-long vacation by the new Dutch owners as the store is renovated, except for Drew Carey (Drew Carey), who has to stay behind to make sure the wages are paid. He learns the owners plan to demolish the store putting the employees out of work. Drew then has to decide whether to inform his co-workers or take a promotion. Meanwhile, Drew's friend Oswald Lee Harvey (Diedrich Bader) buys a pay phone in order to make money.

The episode was written by Brian Scully and directed by Gerry Cohen. It first aired May 26, 1999, on the ABC network in the United States. "Brotherhood of Man" was filmed in April 1999 at the Warner Bros. Studios. Towards the end of the episode, the cast performs the musical number "Brotherhood of Man" from How to Succeed in Business Without Really Trying. Producers hired a vocal coach to assist the cast. Actor Hal Linden makes a guest appearance as Dutch businessman Mr. Van Zandt. Linden had difficulty speaking in a convincing Dutch accent, saying he could do a German accent, but not Dutch. The episode also features a number of cameos from Northeast Ohioans, including radio personalities, entertainers and print media reporters.

"Brotherhood of Man" was seen by an estimated 12.6 million viewers, finishing inside the top 20 in the ratings for the week of May 24–30, 1999. It was the seventh-highest-rated show on ABC that week. The episode received a mostly positive response from critics, with many praising the musical number. Phil Kloer from The Atlanta Constitution called it "a perfect note on which to end the May sweeps." Mark Hughes from The Burlington Free Press said the plot contained some "sharp humor;" however, Robin Oliver of The Sydney Morning Herald thought Oswald's pay phone storyline was a misfire. The show's choreographer Keith Young won the Outstanding Achievement in Episodic Television accolade at the 2000 American Choreography Awards.

== Plot ==
As Winfred-Louder's human resources director Drew Carey is telling his co-worker and enemy Mimi Bobeck about his upcoming weekend break in Montreal, their boss Mr Wick announces that they have a surprise visit from the new Dutch owner of Winfred-Louder, Mr. Van Zandt. Mrs Louder shows Mr. Van Zandt around the main office and introduces him to Drew. He then informs the store's employees that they will be given a one-month paid vacation while the store is closed for renovation. Drew, however, is asked to stay behind to make sure everyone's wages are paid and to deal with any problems starting that weekend. Later, at The Warsaw Tavern, Drew's friends Kate O'Brien and Lewis Kiniski tell him about a concert they are attending that weekend, when Oswald Lee Harvey reveals he has used the ticket money to buy a pay phone in hopes that it will make him rich. Drew invites his girlfriend, Sharon Bridges to spend the weekend with him in the store since they had to cancel their trip. While Sharon and Drew are making out in a tent, they overhear Mr. Van Zandt telling a contractor to clear out the store so they can lay explosives.

Drew confronts Mr. Van Zandt and the other executives about their plan to put the staff out of work. Mr. Van Zandt explains the store barely makes a profit, so they are going to demolish it and create a parking lot. He then shows Drew security footage of his fellow employees being lazy and incompetent, which influenced his decision to close the store. Mr. Van Zandt offers Drew a promotion to store manager of their Toledo outlet if he keeps the demolition a secret. Drew agrees, although he feels guilty that his friends will be fired without warning. At The Warsaw Tavern, Kate and Lewis discuss Oswald's pay phone scheme, which is making a lot of money. Drew tells them about the impending closure of Winfred-Louder and his guilt about keeping it a secret. Larry Almada comes over to boast about his vacation and how Drew has to work, while another employee is thankful for the paid vacation and plans to put in some overtime. Drew realizes there are decent people working at the store and tells the staff everything. He also informs Mr. Van Zandt that the store has been declared a historical landmark because Theodore Roosevelt wrote his inaugural speech there; however, Mr. Van Zandt was already aware and had planned to build a memorial parking structure. He cancels Drew's promotion and orders him to clear the store. Drew then asks Mr. Van Zandt to consider the impact of the staff layoffs by performing "Brotherhood of Man", which appears to convince him to stop the demolition.

== Production ==
"Brotherhood of Man" serves as The Drew Carey Show's 100th episode and the fourth season finale. It was filmed during the week commencing April 12, 1999 at the Warner Bros. Studios in Burbank, California. During a break, the cast and crew marked the occasion by cutting a cake featuring a caricature of Drew Carey's face. The cast were also presented with a drawing of themselves by artist Al Hirshfeld. Carey admitted that it felt like just another show, saying "You know what this is like? When you have a birthday and all your relatives show up and you have to say, 'Hey, thanks for coming.' You have to be like that. That's how I feel right now." The episode was written by Brian Scully and directed by Gerry Cohen. It features a production of "Brotherhood of Man" from the musical How to Succeed in Business Without Really Trying. Josh Wolk of Entertainment Weekly noted that big musical numbers had become a recurring event for the show during the sweeps week ratings period.

Producers brought in a vocal coach to help the cast with the musical number. During one take, the coach informed Kathy Kinney (Mimi) that she was flat, but she could not hear it due to how high she was singing, adding that the part was far out of her vocal range. Christa Miller, who plays Kate, said the producers were worried when she went to record her lines for the song, knowing that she is not a singer. She thought Carey's performance would surprise viewers. Miller also found the dance routine difficult to perform, saying "the whole thing was hard. None of us can dance very well." Ryan Stiles (Lewis) agreed, telling Wolk (Entertainment Weekly) that he and Diedrich Bader (Oswald) were not dancers. He explained that the dance numbers initially bothered him and he used to fool around and "make them a big joke", but he realized that by committing to learning the routines the audience became more sympathetic as they knew the actors were trying.

"Brotherhood of Man" features a guest appearance from actor Hal Linden as Dutch businessman Mr. Van Zandt. Linden found the part "tough", as he had trouble speaking in a convincing Dutch accent, saying "I do a German accent. I couldn't do a Dutch accent." Linden also took part in the song and dance number and he said that Carey often brings it up when they see each other. Ian Gomez, who plays recurring character Larry Almada, appears almost naked during the episode, but is covered by a towel. Gomez, who has appeared without various clothing in other episodes, called the scene "embarrassing" and thought he would feel better about it if he was in good shape. Actors Jenica Bergere, Ron Roggé, and Johnnie Walker also make guest appearances in the episode. "Brotherhood of Man" features a number of small cameos from Northeast Ohioans, including radio personalities Brian Fowler, Joe Cronauer, John Lanigan, Larry Morrow, actor John Henton, entertainers Ron Sweed and Marty Sullivan, news anchor Ted Henry, Carey's brothers and several print media reporters.

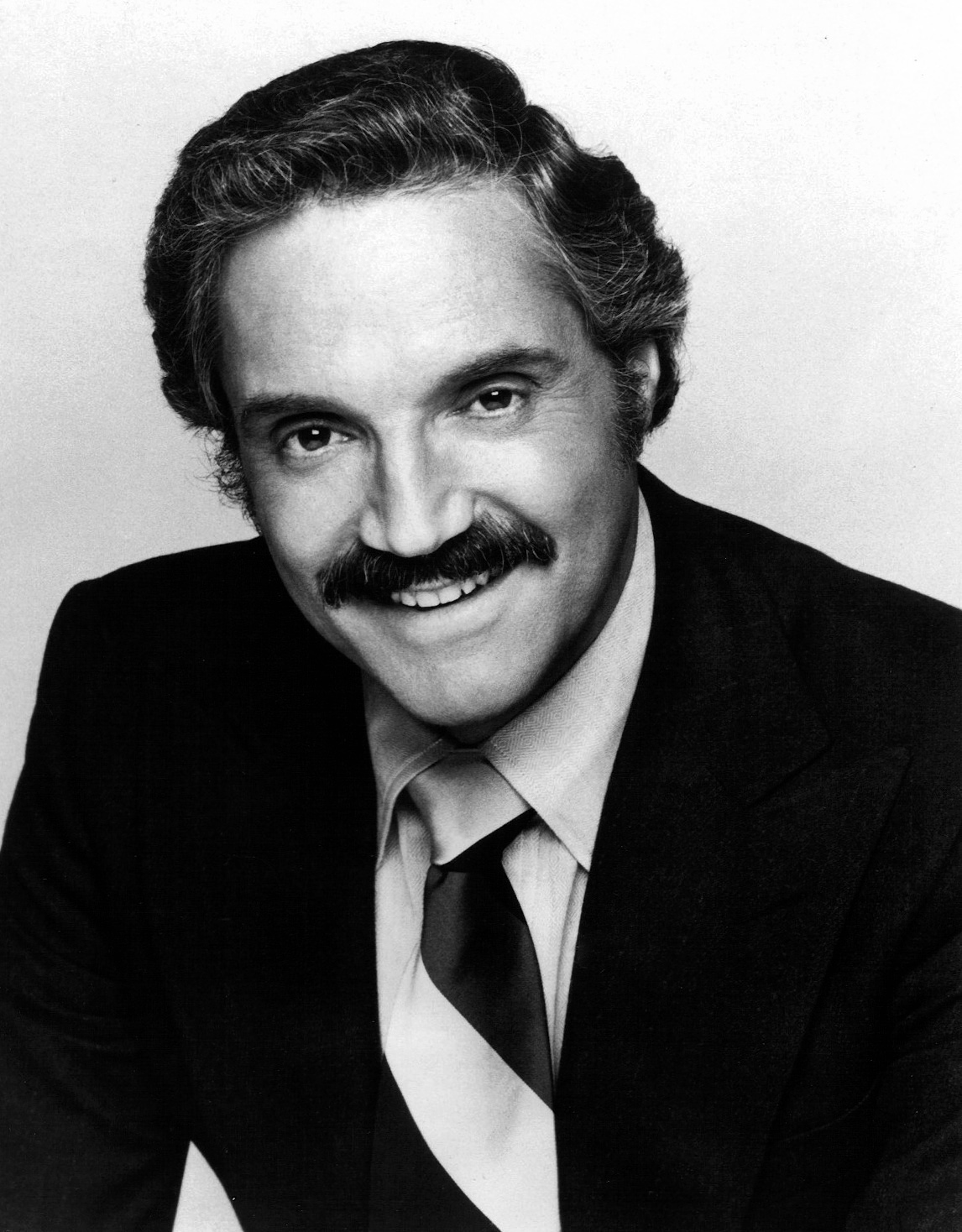
One critic said Hal Linden (pictured) plays Dutch businessman Mr. Van Zandt with "villainous gusto".

== Reception ==
In its original American broadcast, "Brotherhood of Man" finished 17th in the ratings for the week of May 24–30, 1999 and was viewed by an estimated 12.6 million viewers. It was the seventh highest-rated show on ABC that week.

Writing for The Boston Globe, Matthew Gilbert believed that of the four ABC season finales airing that night, The Drew Carey Show "promises to be the most colorful" with its musical number. The Atlanta Constitution's television critic Phil Kloer gave the episode a B+ rating. He felt the episode was mostly teeing up the final number, but he praised the cast for taking on the song and choreography, saying it was "more than most sitcoms would dare." Kloer believed they were able to "pull it off with an infectious exuberance" and concluded: "It's a high, giddy sequence, and a perfect note on which to end the May sweeps." Journalist R.D. Heldenfels, who makes a cameo in the episode, said he would recommend it to his friends, family and colleagues because "it's that good." He called it "one of the best Drew Carey episodes I have ever seen, and not just because I am in it." The Star-Gazette's John Burlingame said the show "ends the season with a bang" with "its most ambitious production number ever".

Faye Zuckerman of The Southern Illinoisan found the musical number to be "as delightful and hilarious as past ones". Mark Hughes from The Burlington Free Press agreed, calling it "a dandy" and went on to praise Linden's singing voice. He also thought the episode "has sharp humor preceding it", adding "on the last day of the TV season, this is a vibrant sendoff." For The Times Herald critic Kevin McDonough noted that unlike other comedies, The Drew Carey Show often showed its appreciation for "the sheer fake hilarity of breaking into song and dance". He called the musical number "fabulously choreographed" and believed that Linden's character was "played with villainous gusto". McDonough concluded that The Drew Carey Show "has a contagious sense of show-biz and fun." Robin Oliver of The Sydney Morning Herald was more critical of the episode's plot, believing there were "some amusing capers", but the sequence with the pay phone "misfires".

Choreographer Keith Young won the Outstanding Achievement in Episodic Television accolade at the 2000 American Choreography Awards for his work on the dance number.
