= Robert Borden (TV producer) =

American TV writer and producer

- Education: Northwestern University
- Occupations: Producer, writer
- Years active: 1988–present
- Notable work: Created: George Lopez

Robert Borden is an American TV writer, and television producer. He is known as executive producer and writer of George Lopez and as a writer for the Late Show with David Letterman.

Borden started his television career as assistant director of Bridge in 1988. He wrote for Roseanne from 1992 to 1993. During 2006 to 2009 he has written for The Late Show with David Letterman and this work was nominated for 3 Primetime Emmys.

From 2002 to 2007 Borden co-produced George Lopez.

== Filmography ==
=== TV Producer ===
- Outsourced (executive producer – 2010–2011)
- George Lopez (executive producer – 2002–2007)
- The Drew Carey Show (producer – 1995–1996)
- The Brian Benben Show (executive producer – 1998–2000)
- Pride & Joy (producer – 1995)

=== TV Writer ===
- Outsourced (TV series 2010–2011)
- Late Show with David Letterman (TV series 2006–2009)
- George Lopez (TV series 2002–2007)
- The Drew Carey Show (TV series 1995–2000)
- The Brian Benben Show (TV series 1998–2000)
- Pride & Joy (TV series 1995)
- Genius (1995)
- The George Carlin Show (TV series 1994)
- Monty (TV series 1994)
- East Side Story (1994)
- Roseanne (TV series 1992–1993)
- Anything But Love (TV series 1992)
