= List of Married... with Children episodes =

The American television sitcom Married... with Children aired its pilot episode on April 5, 1987, and its series finale aired on May 5, 1997, with the episode "The Desperate Half-Hour (Part 1)" and "How to Marry a Moron (Part 2)". (Note: One episode filmed prior to the finale ("Chicago Shoe Exchange") was delayed and didn't air until June 9, 1997.) A total of 259 original episodes aired on Fox during the series' run. All 11 seasons are available on DVD, in Region 1. The list is ordered by the episodes' original air dates. Specials that aired during a regular season run are highlighted in yellow in the list. A season 3 episode, "I'll See You in Court", is known as the "lost episode" and did not air in North America until June 18, 2002, five years after the series' original run.

== Series overview ==
Season	Episodes	Originally released	
Season	Episodes	First released	Last released
1	13	April 5, 1987	June 28, 1987
2	22	September 27, 1987	May 1, 1988
3	22	November 6, 1988	May 21, 1989
4	23	September 3, 1989	May 13, 1990
5	25	September 23, 1990	May 19, 1991
6	26	September 8, 1991	May 17, 1992
7	26	September 13, 1992	May 23, 1993
8	26	September 5, 1993	May 22, 1994
9	26	September 4, 1994	May 21, 1995
10	26	September 17, 1995	May 19, 1996
11	24	September 28, 1996	June 9, 1997

== Episodes ==
=== Season 1 (1987) ===
The first season of Married... with Children introduces the major characters: Al, Peg, Kelly and Bud Bundy, along with their neighbors, Steve and Marcy Rhoades. The first season is the only one in which Al and Peg are regularly intimate, to the point of Al initiating the sessions. It is also the only one where Peg can be seen doing housework under normal circumstances (despite being bad at it), and she even has her own car, a Ford Pinto (as seen in "Sixteen Years and What Do You Get"). The Bundy's fridge is also filled in every episode. In "Thinergy," Bud mentions that Kelly had been held back a year in school. Al's dislike of the French is first shown in this season and it is also the first time that he calls Marcy a "chicken." It also contains the first mention of Peg's family being "hillbillies" from the fictional Wanker County, Wisconsin.

No. overall	No. in season	Title	Directed by	Written by	Original release date	Prod. code	Rating/share (households)
1	1	"Pilot"	Linda Day	Ron Leavitt & Michael G. Moye	April 5, 1987	1.01	6.1/10
2	2	"Thinergy"	Linda Day	Michael G. Moye & Ron Leavitt	April 12, 1987	1.02	5.2/8
3	3	"But I Didn't Shoot the Deputy"	Linda Day	Ron Burla	April 19, 1987	1.04	N/A
4	4	"Whose Room Is It Anyway"	Zane Buzby	Marcy Vosburgh & Sandy Sprung	April 26, 1987	1.06	N/A
5	5	"Have You Driven a Ford Lately?"	Linda Day	Richard Gurman & Katherine Green	May 3, 1987	1.05	N/A
6	6	"Sixteen Years and What Do You Get"	Linda Day	Katherine Green & Richard Gurman	May 10, 1987	1.03	N/A
7	7	"Married... without Children"	Linda Day	Story by : Matt Geller; Teleplay by : Ralph R. Farquhar	May 17, 1987	1.09	N/A
8	8	"The Poker Game"	Brian Levant	Ron Leavitt & Michael G. Moye	May 24, 1987	1.10	N/A
9	9	"Peggy Sue Got Work"	Linda Day	Ellen L. Fogle	May 31, 1987	1.08	N/A
10	10	"Al Loses His Cherry"	Arlando Smith	Marcy Vosburgh & Sandy Sprung	June 7, 1987	1.07	N/A
11	11	"Nightmare on Al's Street"	Linda Day	Michael G. Moye	June 14, 1987	1.12	N/A
12	12	"Where's the Boss"	Linda Day	Marcy Vosburgh & Sandy Sprung	June 21, 1987	1.11	N/A
13	13	"Johnny B. Gone"	Linda Day	Katherine Green & Richard Gurman	June 28, 1987	1.13	N/A

=== Season 2 (1987–88) ===
At the beginning of the second season, Kelly is portrayed as a girl of reasonable intelligence (though she is often teased by Bud for her promiscuity and bleached hair). By the end, however, her character obtains her trademark stupidity that will become both a plot device and comic focus for the rest of the series. This season also contains the first use of the "Bundy Cheer" and the first instance of the Bundys taking a trip. Additionally, it marked the beginning of the "Thank your father, kids" running gag. Although Buck is portrayed in later seasons as having been with the Bundys since he was a pup, Peg implies that they have had him for only three years and Al states that he is actually Bud's pet; he even "speaks" once ("Buck Can Do It"), something that becomes a regular feature beginning in the fourth season. Michael Faustino (David's younger brother) makes the first of five guest appearances during the course of the series.

No. overall	No. in season	Title	Directed by	Written by	Original release date	Prod. code	Rating (households)
14	1	"Poppy's by the Tree"	Linda Day	Michael G. Moye & Ron Leavitt	September 27, 1987	202	3.7
15	2	"Poppy's by the Tree"	Linda Day	Michael G. Moye & Ron Leavitt	September 27, 1987	203	3.7
16	3	"If I Were a Rich Man"	Linda Day	Sandy Sprung & Marcy Vosburgh	October 4, 1987	204	2.7
17	4	"Buck Can Do It"	Linda Day	Michael G. Moye & Ron Leavitt	October 11, 1987	201	5.8
18	5	"Girls Just Wanna Have Fun"	Linda Day	Tracy Gamble & Richard Vaczy	October 18, 1987	206	5.5
19	6	"Girls Just Wanna Have Fun"	Linda Day	Tracy Gamble & Richard Vaczy	October 18, 1987	207	5.5
20	7	"For Whom the Bell Tolls"	Linda Day	Richard Gurman & Katherine Green	October 25, 1987	205	3.7
21	8	"Born to Walk"	Linda Day	John Vorhaus	November 1, 1987	208	4.0
22	9	"Alley of the Dolls"	Linda Day	Sandy Sprung & Marcy Vosburgh	November 8, 1987	209	4.8
23	10	"The Razor's Edge"	Gerry Cohen	Ellen L. Fogle	November 15, 1987	210	N/A
24	11	"How Do You Spell Revenge?"	Linda Day	Ralph R. Farquhar	November 22, 1987	211	5.0
25	12	"Earth Angel"	Linda Day	Ellen L. Fogle	December 6, 1987	212	4.0
26	13	"You Better Watch Out"	Linda Day	Katherine Green & Richard Gurman	December 20, 1987	213	3.9
27	14	"Guys and Dolls"	Linda Day	Sandy Sprung & Marcy Vosburgh	January 10, 1988	214	4.3
28	15	"Build a Better Mousetrap"	Linda Day	Story by : J. Stanford Parker; Teleplay by : Michael G. Moye & Ron Leavitt	January 24, 1988	215	5.1
29	16	"Master the Possibilities"	Linda Day	Michael G. Moye & Ron Leavitt	February 7, 1988	216	5.0
30	17	"Peggy Loves Al, Yeah, Yeah, Yeah"	Gerry Cohen	Ralph R. Farquhar	February 14, 1988	217	4.7
31	18	"The Great Escape"	Linda Day	Ellen L. Fogle	February 21, 1988	218	5.7
32	19	"Impo-Dent"	Gerry Cohen	Sandy Sprung & Marcy Vosburgh	February 28, 1988	219	5.3
33	20	"Just Married... with Children"	Linda Day	Ellen L. Fogle	March 6, 1988	220	4.6
34	21	"Father Lode"	Linda Day	Jerry Perzigian	March 13, 1988	221	5.7
35	22	"All in the Family"	Linda Day	Marcy Vosburgh & Sandy Sprung	May 1, 1988	222	6.0

=== Season 3 (1988–89) ===
The third season marks a notable increase in the show's popularity, based on Terry Rakolta's morality campaign against the show, which began after the episode "Her Cups Runneth Over", where Al and Steve go to a lingerie store in search of Peggy's favorite bra (which had been discontinued). This season also contains the "lost episode" "I'll See You in Court", which was not aired in North America until June 18, 2002, after the show's initial run on the cable channel FX (and was included in the season-three DVD set). Michael Faustino makes his second guest appearance. During the season, the show became the first to have a quarter of the viewership on Fox.

No. overall	No. in season	Title	Directed by	Written by	Original release date	Prod. code	U.S. viewers (millions)	Rating/share (households)
36	1	"He Thought He Could"	Gerry Cohen	Ron Leavitt & Michael G. Moye	November 6, 1988	302	N/A	9.4/13
37	2	"I'm Going to Sweatland"	Gerry Cohen	Story by : Carl Studebaker; Teleplay by : Pamela Wick	November 20, 1988	303	N/A	10.0/14
38	3	"Poke High"	Gerry Cohen	Ralph R. Farquhar	November 27, 1988	304	N/A	10.5/15
39	4	"The Camping Show" "A Period Piece"	Gerry Cohen	Sandy Sprung & Marcy Vosburgh	December 11, 1988	301	12.7	8.2/12
40	5	"A Dump of My Own"	Gerry Cohen	Michael G. Moye & Ron Leavitt	January 8, 1989	305	17.6	10.3/14
41	6	"Her Cups Runneth Over"	Gerry Cohen	Marcy Vosburgh & Sandy Sprung	January 15, 1989	306	18.7	10.3/15
42	7	"The Bald and the Beautiful"	John Sgueglia	Jules Dennis & Richard Mueller	January 29, 1989	307	17.8	10.4/15
43	8	"The Gypsy Cried"	Gerry Cohen	Richard Gurman	February 5, 1989	309	18.5	10.9/15
44	9	"Requiem for a Dead Barber"	James E. Hornbeck	Ron Leavitt & Michael G. Moye	February 12, 1989	310	21.6	12.0/18
45	10	"I'll See You in Court"	Gerry Cohen	Jeanne Baruch & Jeanne Romano	Unaired; June 18, 2002 (on FX)	308	N/A	N/A
46	11	"Eatin' Out"	Gerry Cohen	Sandy Sprung & Marcy Vosburgh	February 19, 1989	311	19.9	11.5/17
47	12	"My Mom, the Mom"	Gerry Cohen	Story by : Jan Rosenbloom; Teleplay by : Lesa Kite & Cindy Begel	February 26, 1989	312	21.1	12.5/18
48	13	"Can't Dance, Don't Ask Me"	Gerry Cohen	Story by : Gabrielle Topping; Teleplay by : Robert Ulin	March 5, 1989	313	19.7	11.4/17
49	14	"A Three Job, No Income Family"	Gerry Cohen	Richard Gurman	March 19, 1989	314	17.4	10.9/16
50	15	"The Harder They Fall"	Gerry Cohen	Ellen L. Fogle	March 26, 1989	315	16.2	10.4/17
51	16	"The House That Peg Lost"	Gerry Cohen	Steve Granat & Mel Sherer	April 9, 1989	316	19.3	12.0/18
52	17	"Married... with Prom Queen (Part I)"	Gerry Cohen	Ellen L. Fogle	April 23, 1989	317	17.5	10.6/17
53	18	"Married... with Prom Queen: The Sequel (Part II)"	Gerry Cohen	Ellen L. Fogle	April 30, 1989	318	17.7	11.2/18
54	19	"The Dateless Amigo"	Gerry Cohen	Sara V. Finney & Vida Spears	May 7, 1989	320	17.8	10.2/16
55	20	"The Computer Show"	Gerry Cohen	Ralph R. Farquhar	May 14, 1989	319	14.1	8.5/14
56	21	"Life's a Beach"	Gerry Cohen	Ralph R. Farquhar	May 21, 1989	321	17.5	10.6/17
57	22	"Here's Lookin' at You, Kid"	Gerry Cohen	Story by : Len O'Neill; Teleplay by : Jeanne Baruch & Jeanne Romano	August 27, 1989	322	17.5	10.6/17

=== Season 4 (1989–90) ===
The fourth season had the departure of Marcy's husband Steve Rhoades. Marcy remained single for the remainder of the season. This was also the first season where the audience would applaud when a major character would enter a scene for the first time in the episode, and a Bundyesque version of the classic film It's a Wonderful Life. In the episode "It's a Bundyful Life (Part 2)," Ted McGinley makes a guest appearance as Norman Jablonsky before reappearing as a regular cast member in the next season as Jefferson D'Arcy. Also, Michael Faustino makes his third guest appearance. This was also the final season for writers Marcy Vosburgh & Sandy Sprung.

No. overall	No. in season	Title	Directed by	Written by	Original release date	Prod. code	U.S. viewers (millions)
58	1	"Hot Off the Grill"	Gerry Cohen	Story by : Gabrielle Topping; Teleplay by : Michael G. Moye & Ron Leavitt	September 3, 1989	401	17.9
59	2	"Dead Men Don't Do Aerobics"	Gerry Cohen	Katherine Green	September 10, 1989	402	22.2
60	3	"Buck Saves the Day"	Gerry Cohen	Marcy Vosburgh & Sandy Sprung	September 24, 1989	403	17.3
61	4	"Tooth or Consequences"	Gerry Cohen	Story by : Will Rogers; Teleplay by : Sheldon Krasner & David Saling	October 1, 1989	404	20.4
62	5	"He Ain't Much But He's Mine"	Gerry Cohen	Lisa Rosenthal	October 8, 1989	405	21.3
63	6	"Fair Exchange"	Gerry Cohen	Al Aidekman	October 29, 1989	406	21.5
64	7	"Desperately Seeking Miss October"	Gerry Cohen	Arthur Silver & Steve Bing	November 5, 1989	407	19.1
65	8	"976-SHOE"	Gerry Cohen	Sandy Sprung & Marcy Vosburgh	November 12, 1989	408	18.7
66	9	"Oh, What a Feeling"	Gerry Cohen	Ron Leavitt & Michael G. Moye	November 19, 1989	409	20.3
67	10	"At the Zoo"	Gerry Cohen	Katherine Green	November 26, 1989	410	18.9
68	11	"It's a Bundyful Life: Parts 1 & 2"	Gerry Cohen	Michael G. Moye & Ron Leavitt	December 17, 1989	412	31.4
69	12	"It's a Bundyful Life: Parts 1 & 2"	Gerry Cohen	Michael G. Moye & Ron Leavitt	December 17, 1989	413	31.4
70	13	"Who'll Stop the Rain"	Gerry Cohen	Kevin Curran	January 7, 1990	411	20.1
71	14	"A Taxing Problem"	Gerry Cohen	Paul Diamond	January 14, 1990	415	23.6
72	15	"Rock and Roll Girl"	Linda Day	Ellen L. Fogle	February 4, 1990	414	22.6
73	16	"You Gotta Know When to Hold 'Em: Part 1"	Gerry Cohen	Sioux Doanham	February 11, 1990	416	23.1
74	17	"You Gotta Know When to Hold 'Em: Part 2"	Gerry Cohen	Kevin Curran	February 18, 1990	417	25.2
75	18	"What Goes Around Came Around"	Gerry Cohen	Ellen L. Fogle	February 25, 1990	418	26.1
76	19	"Peggy Turns 300"	Tony Singletary	Katherine Green	March 25, 1990	420	28.2
77	20	"Peggy Made a Little Lamb"	Gerry Cohen	Ellen L. Fogle	April 15, 1990	421	28.6
78	21	"Rain Girl"	Gerry Cohen	Kevin Curran	April 29, 1990	419	27.1
79	22	"The Agony of De Feet"	Gerry Cohen	Diane Burroughs & Joey Gutierrez	May 6, 1990	422	25.0
80	23	"Yard Sale"	Gerry Cohen	Marcy Vosburgh & Sandy Sprung	May 13, 1990	423	25.5

=== Season 5 (1990–91) ===
The fifth season marked the introduction of Jefferson D'Arcy (Ted McGinley), as Marcy's new husband. The series reached its 100th episode this season, which was the pilot for the spin-off Top of the Heap, the first of three spinoffs from Married... with Children. Al's favorite show Psycho Dad is also first referred to in this season, along with his first mention of scoring four touchdowns in one high school football game.

No. overall	No. in season	Title	Directed by	Written by	Original release date	Prod. code	U.S. viewers (millions)
81	1	"We'll Follow the Sun"	Gerry Cohen	Ron Leavitt & Michael G. Moye	September 23, 1990	502	19.3
82	2	"Al... with Kelly"	Gerry Cohen	Story by : Gabrielle Topping; Teleplay by : Stacie Lipp	September 30, 1990	501	22.8
83	3	"Sue Casa, His Casa"	Gerry Cohen	Kevin Curran	October 7, 1990	503	19.8
84	4	"The Unnatural"	Gerry Cohen	Katherine Green	October 14, 1990	504	21.9
85	5	"The Dance Show"	Gerry Cohen	Arthur Silver	October 21, 1990	505	23.5
86	6	"Kelly Bounces Back"	Gerry Cohen	Al Aidekman	October 28, 1990	506	20.9
87	7	"Married... with Aliens"	Gerry Cohen	Ellen L. Fogle	November 4, 1990	507	20.9
88	8	"Wabbit Season"	Gerry Cohen	Ron Leavitt & Michael G. Moye	November 11, 1990	508	18.9
89	9	"Do Ya Think I'm Sexy"	Gerry Cohen	Kevin Curran	November 18, 1990	509	20.4
90	10	"One Down, Two to Go"	Gerry Cohen	Ralph R. Farquhar	November 25, 1990	510	24.2
91	11	"And Baby Makes Money"	Gerry Cohen	Art Everett	December 16, 1990	511	17.6
92	12	"Married... with Who"	Gerry Cohen	Ellen L. Fogle	January 6, 1991	512	20.8
93	13	"The Godfather"	Gerry Cohen	Ralph R. Farquhar	February 3, 1991	514	20.1
94	14	"Look Who's Barking"	Gerry Cohen	Katherine Green	February 10, 1991	513	18.6
95	15	"A Man's Castle"	Gerry Cohen	Stacie Lipp	February 17, 1991	515	10.2
96	16	"All Night Security Dude"	Gerry Cohen	Glenn Eichler & Peter Gaffney	February 24, 1991	516	20.7
97	17	"Oldies But Young 'Uns"	Gerry Cohen	Bill Prady	March 17, 1991	518	16.7
98	18	"Weenie Tot Lovers & Other Strangers"	Gerry Cohen	Kevin Curran	March 24, 1991	517	18.7
99	19	"Kids! Wadaya Gonna Do?"	Linda Day	Ellen L. Fogle	April 7, 1991	521	19.0
100	20	"Top of the Heap"	Gerry Cohen	Ron Leavitt & Arthur Silver	April 7, 1991	525	18.0
101	21	"You Better Shop Around: Part 1"	Linda Day	John Brancato and Michael Ferris	April 14, 1991	519	21.3
102	22	"You Better Shop Around: Part 2"	Linda Day	Stacie Lipp	April 21, 1991	520	23.1
103	23	"Route 666: Part 1"	Gerry Cohen	Katherine Green	April 28, 1991	522	16.5
104	24	"Route 666: Part 2"	Gerry Cohen	Ralph R. Farquhar	May 5, 1991	523	20.7
105	25	"Buck the Stud"	Gerry Cohen	Chip Johannessen & John Rinker	May 19, 1991	524	16.6

=== Season 6 (1991–92) ===
Throughout the season, both Peg and Marcy were pregnant, as Katey Sagal was pregnant in real life. Sagal's child was stillborn six weeks before term, causing her to miss four episodes of this season. At the end of the season's 11th episode, "Al Bundy, Shoe Dick", the women's pregnancies were revealed to be merely part of one of Al's nightmares. This season also had Steve Rhoades return for one episode, Kelly becoming the "Verminator", and the Bundys traveling to England. Additionally, this season introduced Bud's hip hop-inspired alter ego "Grandmaster B", concocted to help him with women, which continued after the dream revelation by having Al ask Bud about the nickname and Bud deciding that he likes it enough to use it.

No. overall	No. in season	Title	Directed by	Written by	Original release date	Prod. code	U.S. viewers (millions)
106	1	"She's Having My Baby: Part 1"	Gerry Cohen	Ron Leavitt & Michael G. Moye	September 8, 1991	6.01	29.2
107	2	"She's Having My Baby: Part 2"	Gerry Cohen	Kevin Curran	September 15, 1991	6.02	23.7
108	3	"If Al Had a Hammer"	Gerry Cohen	Kevin Curran	September 22, 1991	6.03	26.1
109	4	"Cheese, Cues and Blood"	Gerry Cohen	Story by : Allan Davis; Teleplay by : Brian Scully	September 29, 1991	6.04	22.6
110	5	"Looking for a Desk in All the Wrong Places"	Gerry Cohen	Stacie Lipp	October 6, 1991	6.05	21.6
111	6	"Buck Has a Bellyache"	Gerry Cohen	Ellen L. Fogle	October 13, 1991	6.06	19.7
112	7	"If I Could See Me Now"	Amanda Bearse	Gabrielle Topping	October 27, 1991	6.07	18.0
113	8	"God's Shoes"	Gerry Cohen	Ellen L. Fogle	November 3, 1991	6.08	18.5
114	9	"Kelly Does Hollywood: Part 1"	Gerry Cohen	Larry Jacobson	November 10, 1991	6.09	19.7
115	10	"Kelly Does Hollywood: Part 2"	Gerry Cohen	Larry Jacobson	November 17, 1991	6.10	15.0
116	11	"Al Bundy, Shoe Dick"	Gerry Cohen	Larry Jacobson	November 24, 1991	6.11	22.4
117	12	"So This Is How Sinatra Felt"	Gerry Cohen	Stacie Lipp	December 1, 1991	6.12	21.7
118	13	"I Who Have Nothing"	Gerry Cohen	Katherine Green	December 22, 1991	6.13	19.0
119	14	"The Mystery of Skull Island"	Gerry Cohen	Kevin Curran	January 5, 1992	6.14	23.1
120	15	"Just Shoe It"	Gerry Cohen	Lisa Chernin	January 19, 1992	6.15	20.8
121	16	"Rites of Passage"	Gerry Cohen	Ilunga Adell	February 9, 1992	6.16	18.8
122	17	"The Egg and I"	Gerry Cohen	Ellen L. Fogle	February 16, 1992	6.17	23.1
123	18	"My Dinner With Anthrax"	Gerry Cohen	Larry Jacobson	February 23, 1992	6.19	22.4
124	19	"Psychic Avengers"	Amanda Bearse	Calvin Brown, Jr.	March 1, 1992	6.18	18.3
125	20	"Hi I.Q."	Gerry Cohen	Steve Crider	March 22, 1992	6.20	22.7
126	21	"Teacher Pets"	Gerry Cohen	Katherine Green	April 5, 1992	6.21	23.5
127	22	"The Goodbye Girl"	Gerry Cohen	Stacie Lipp	April 19, 1992	6.22	19.8
128	23	"The Gas Station Show"	Gerry Cohen	Michael G. Moye & Ron Leavitt	April 26, 1992	6.23	20.6
129	24	"England Show: Part 1"	Gerry Cohen	Ellen L. Fogle	May 3, 1992	6.24	19.0
130	25	"England Show: Part 2" "Wastin' the Company's Money"	Gerry Cohen	Stacie Lipp	May 10, 1992	6.25	18.6
131	26	"England Show: Part 3" "We're Spending as Fast as We Can"	Gerry Cohen	Kevin Curran	May 17, 1992	6.26	17.1

=== Season 7 (1992–93) ===
In the seventh season, the writers introduced Seven (played by Shane Sweet) in an attempt to give the Bundys a third child. When the audience was unreceptive, he was removed from the series with no explanation other than being left at the D'Arcys' (Seven was last seen being told a bedtime story in "Peggy and the Pirates"). However, a subtle reference to him is made in season eight, episode 22, when he appears as the missing child on a carton of milk. Bud also loses his virginity during this season and he makes his first appearance with a beard (which was mistaken for dirt in the episode where Bud first notices he is growing a beard). Steve Rhoades also makes another guest appearance during this season, as do Dan Castellaneta and Michael Faustino.

No. overall	No. in season	Title	Directed by	Written by	Original release date	Prod. code	U.S. viewers (millions)
132	1	"Magnificent Seven"	Gerry Cohen	Arthur Silver	September 13, 1992	7.01	22.8
133	2	"T-R-A-Something-Something Spells Tramp"	Gerry Cohen	Ron Leavitt & Ellen L. Fogle	September 20, 1992	7.02	21.4
134	3	"Every Bundy Has a Birthday"	Gerry Cohen	Richard Gurman	September 27, 1992	7.03	19.8
135	4	"Al on the Rocks"	Gerry Cohen	Andrew Smith	October 4, 1992	7.04	22.2
136	5	"What I Did for Love"	Gerry Cohen	Ellen L. Fogle	October 11, 1992	7.05	20.7
137	6	"Frat Chance"	Gerry Cohen	Larry Jacobson	October 25, 1992	7.06	19.0
138	7	"The Chicago Wine Party"	Gerry Cohen	Stacie Lipp	November 1, 1992	7.07	14.3
139	8	"Kelly Doesn't Live Here Anymore"	Amanda Bearse	Gabrielle Topping	November 8, 1992	7.08	18.5
140	9	"Rock of Ages"	Gerry Cohen	Al Aidekman	November 15, 1992	7.09	14.8
141	10	"Death of a Shoe Salesman"	Gerry Cohen	Stacie Lipp	November 22, 1992	7.10	20.0
142	11	"Old College Try"	Gerry Cohen	Story by : P. Sharon; Teleplay by : Diane Burroughs & Joey Gutierrez	December 13, 1992	7.11	16.8
143	12	"Christmas"	Gerry Cohen	Ellen L. Fogle	December 20, 1992	7.12	19.1
144	13	"The Wedding Show"	Gerry Cohen	Arthur Silver	January 10, 1993	7.13	19.1
145	14	"It Doesn't Get Any Better Than This"	Sam W. Orender	Michael G. Moye	January 24, 1993	7.14	19.4
146	15	"Heels on Wheels"	Gerry Cohen	Stacie Lipp	February 7, 1993	7.15	18.8
147	16	"Mr. Empty Pants"	Gerry Cohen	George Tricker	February 14, 1993	7.16	15.7
148	17	"You Can't Miss"	Amanda Bearse	Joel Valentincic & Scott Zimbler	February 21, 1993	7.17	20.5
149	18	"Peggy and the Pirates"	Gerry Cohen	Richard Gurman	February 28, 1993	7.18	20.2
150	19	"Go for the Old"	Gerry Cohen	Stacie Lipp	March 14, 1993	7.19	18.4
151	20	"Un-Alful Entry"	Amanda Bearse	Larry Jacobson	March 28, 1993	7.20	17.4
152	21	"Movie Show"	Gerry Cohen	Ellen L. Fogle	April 11, 1993	7.21	16.5
153	22	"'Til Death Do Us Part"	Gerry Cohen	Stacie Lipp	April 25, 1993	7.22	16.0
154	23	"Tis Time to Smell the Roses"	Gerry Cohen	Kevin Curran	May 2, 1993	7.23	15.0
155	24	"Old Insurance Dodge"	Gerry Cohen	Larry Jacobson	May 9, 1993	7.24	14.2
156	25	"Wedding Repercussions"	Gerry Cohen	Arthur Silver	May 16, 1993	7.25	17.7
157	26	"The Proposition"	Gerry Cohen	Arthur Silver	May 23, 1993	7.26	16.0

=== Season 8 (1993–94) ===
The eighth season introduces many of Al's friends, including Aaron, Bob Rooney, and Officer Dan (though Officer Dan was not a character in the earlier seasons, the actor who played him also appeared in "Rock 'n Roll Girl" as the sheriff who issued Al a ticket for an insulting bumper sticker, "Weenie Tot Lovers and Other Strangers" as the police officer who arrested Al, and "The Egg and I" as the FBI agent searching for Steve). Al, Jefferson, Bob Rooney, and Officer Dan (along with Griff and Ike, who are introduced in season nine) all become members of NO MA'AM in the episode where the men fight back against a talk show host (played by Jerry Springer) known as "The Masculine Feminist". This is also the season where Bud joins a fraternity. The closest to an explanation for Seven's mysterious disappearance 14 months before is in the episode "Ride Scare", where a closeup on a carton of milk reveals a picture of Seven with the word "Missing". Al's plus-sized model friends simply look at it without comment before helping themselves.

No. overall	No. in season	Title	Directed by	Written by	Original release date	Prod. code	U.S. viewers (millions)
158	1	"A Tisket, a Tasket, Can Peg Make a Basket?"	Tony Singletary	Kim Weiskopf	September 5, 1993	801	14.5
159	2	"Hood 'n the Boyz"	Tony Singletary	Michael G. Moye	September 12, 1993	802	15.2
160	3	"Proud to Be Your Bud?"	Tony Singletary	Stacie Lipp	September 19, 1993	803	15.0
161	4	"Luck of the Bundys"	Tony Singletary	Richard Gurman	September 26, 1993	804	17.0
162	5	"Banking on Marcy"	Tony Singletary	Stacie Lipp	October 3, 1993	805	16.6
163	6	"No Chicken, No Check"	Tony Singletary	Ralph R. Farquhar	October 10, 1993	806	16.5
164	7	"Take My Wife, Please"	Tony Singletary	Story by : Brad Yuen; Teleplay by : Peter Gaulke & Eddie Feldmann	October 24, 1993	807	21.0
165	8	"Scared Single"	Sam W. Orender	Katherine Green	November 7, 1993	808	15.6
166	9	"NO MA'AM"	Tony Singletary	Larry Jacobson	November 14, 1993	809	12.6
167	10	"Dances with Weezie"	Tony Singletary	Richard Gurman	November 21, 1993	810	19.4
168	11	"Change for a Buck"	Amanda Bearse	Kim Weiskopf	November 28, 1993	811	12.9
169	12	"A Little Off the Top"	Sam W. Orender	Michael G. Moye	December 12, 1993	812	12.1
170	13	"The Worst Noel"	Amanda Bearse	Larry Jacobson	December 19, 1993	813	16.4
171	14	"Sofa So Good"	Amanda Bearse	Doug McIntyre	January 16, 1994	815	21.5
172	15	"Honey, I Blew Up Myself"	Sam W. Orender	Wayne Kline	January 23, 1994	814	21.5
173	16	"How Green Was My Apple"	Gerry Cohen	Katherine Green	February 6, 1994	816	18.7
174	17	"Valentine's Day Massacre"	Gerry Cohen	Cindy Begel	February 13, 1994	818	18.1
175	18	"Get Outta Dodge"	Sam W. Orender	Mark Driscoll	February 20, 1994	817	16.1
176	19	"Field of Screams"	Gerry Cohen	Al Aidekman	February 27, 1994	819	16.8
177	20	"The D'Arcy Files"	Gerry Cohen	Ilunga Adell	March 27, 1994	820	18.1
178	21	"Nooner or Nothing"	Gerry Cohen	Nancy Neufeld	April 10, 1994	822	16.0
179	22	"Ride Scare"	Sam W. Orender	Nancy Neufeld	April 24, 1994	825	16.1
180	23	"The Legend of Ironhead Haynes"	Gerry Cohen	Katherine Green	May 1, 1994	821	17.1
181	24	"Assault and Batteries"	Sam W. Orender	David Castro	May 8, 1994	824	17.4
182	25	"Al Goes Deep"	Amanda Bearse	Garry Bowren & Laurie Lee-Goss	May 15, 1994	826	14.5
183	26	"Kelly Knows Something"	Amanda Bearse	Al Aidekman	May 22, 1994	823	13.2

=== Season 9 (1994–95) ===
The ninth season rounds out the cast of Al's friends by introducing Griff, who works at Gary's Shoes with Al, and Ike. Steve Rhoades also makes his final two appearances during this season. The season also includes the cancellation of Psycho Dad, Bud getting a job as a driving examiner, and the first appearances of shoe-store owner Gary (who turns out to be a woman), Marcy's niece Amber (who was introduced as a foil for Bud, before being dropped from the show after four episodes), and reporter Miranda Veracruz De La Hoya Cardinal. Michael Faustino makes his fifth and final guest appearance.

No. overall	No. in season	Title	Directed by	Written by	Original release date	Prod. code	U.S. viewers (millions)
184	1	"Shoeway to Heaven"	Gerry Cohen	Story by : Carl Studebaker; Teleplay by : Nancy Steen	September 4, 1994	901	15.1
185	2	"Driving Mr. Boondy"	Gerry Cohen	Donald Beck	September 11, 1994	902	14.6
186	3	"Kelly Breaks Out"	Gerry Cohen	Larry Jacobson	September 18, 1994	903	15.8
187	4	"Naughty but Niece"	Gerry Cohen	David Castro	September 25, 1994	904	16.5
188	5	"Business Sucks: Part 1"	Gerry Cohen	Richard Gurman	October 2, 1994	905	13.3
189	6	"Business Still Sucks: Part 2"	Gerry Cohen	Stacie Lipp	October 9, 1994	906	14.3
190	7	"Dial "B" for Virgin"	Amanda Bearse	Wayne Kline	October 16, 1994	907	16.1
191	8	"Sleepless in Chicago"	Katherine Green	Katherine Green	October 23, 1994	908	15.7
192	9	"No Pot to Pease In"	Gerry Cohen	John Glenn Houston	November 6, 1994	909	16.3
193	10	"Dud Bowl"	Gerry Cohen	Kim Weiskopf	November 13, 1994	910	16.7
194	11	"A Man for No Seasons"	Amanda Bearse	Kim Weiskopf	November 27, 1994	911	14.2
195	12	"I Want My Psycho Dad: Part 1"	Gerry Cohen	Barry Gold	December 11, 1994	913	13.1
196	13	"I Want My Psycho Dad: Part 2" "Second Blood"	Gerry Cohen	David Castro	December 18, 1994	914	16.0
197	14	"The Naked and the Dead, But Mostly the Naked"	Sam W. Orender	Michael G. Moye	January 8, 1995	912	17.8
198	15	"Kelly Takes a Shot"	Amanda Bearse	Al Aidekman	January 15, 1995	915	17.7
—	—	"Special: The Best O'Bundy: Married with... Children's 200th Episode Celebration"	Bill Brown	Paul Wales	February 5, 1995	—	19.2
199	16	"Get the Dodge Outta Hell"	Gerry Cohen	Larry Jacobson	February 5, 1995	917	21.0
200	17	"25 Years and What Have You Got?"	Sam W. Orender	Donald Beck	February 12, 1995	918	16.4
201	18	"Ship Happens: Part 1"	Gerry Cohen	Michele J. Wolff	February 19, 1995	919	13.9
202	19	"Ship Happens: Part 2"	Gerry Cohen	Katherine Green	February 26, 1995	920	17.4
203	20	"Something Larry This Way Comes"	Amanda Bearse	Alison Taylor	March 12, 1995	916	16.5
204	21	"And Bingo Was Her Game-O"	Gerry Cohen	Laurie Lee-Goss & Garry Bowren	March 26, 1995	921	14.6
205	22	"User Friendly"	Sam W. Orender	Russell Marcus	April 9, 1995	923	10.4
206	23	"Pump Fiction"	Gerry Cohen	Kim Weiskopf & David Castro	April 30, 1995	925	12.9
—	—	"Special: My Favorite Married"	Bill Brown	—	April 30, 1995	—	12.8
207	24	"Radio Free Trumaine"	Gerry Cohen	Richard Gurman & Stacie Lipp	May 7, 1995	926	10.5
208	25	"Shoeless Al"	Amanda Bearse	Bootsie^{[A]}	May 14, 1995	924	10.5
209	26	"The Undergraduate"	Amanda Bearse	Fran E. Kaufer	May 21, 1995	922	13.9

Note

A. 'Bootsie' is a pseudonym for J. Stanford Parker.

=== Season 10 (1995–96) ===
The tenth season had the death of family pet Buck and his subsequent reincarnation into the body of Lucky, the Bundys' next dog. The season also marks the first appearances of Peggy's father Ephraim (played by Tim Conway) and Peggy's mother, who moves in with the Bundys (although she is never seen, only heard). Also, Peg leaves Al and goes on a search for her father.

No. overall	No. in season	Title	Directed by	Written by	Original release date	Prod. code	U.S. viewers (millions)
210	1	"Guess Who's Coming to Breakfast, Lunch and Dinner"	Gerry Cohen	Russell Marcus	September 17, 1995	1002	15.5
211	2	"A Shoe Room with a View"	Gerry Cohen	Richard Gurman & Stacie Lipp	September 24, 1995	1001	13.4
212	3	"Requiem for a Dead Briard"	Gerry Cohen	Michael G. Moye	October 1, 1995	1003	13.3
213	4	"Reverend Al"	Gerry Cohen	Kim Weiskopf	October 8, 1995	1004	12.0
214	5	"How Bleen Was My Kelly"	Amanda Bearse	Daniel O'Keefe	October 15, 1995	1005	12.3
215	6	"The Weaker Sex"	Amanda Bearse	Dvora Inwood	October 22, 1995	1006	9.7
216	7	"Flight of the Bumblebee"	Gerry Cohen	Calvin Brown, Jr.	October 29, 1995	1007	17.7
217	8	"Blond and Blonder"	Gerry Cohen	Stacie Lipp & Richard Gurman	November 5, 1995	1008	15.1
218	9	"The Two that Got Away"	Amanda Bearse	Al Aidekman	November 19, 1995	1011	13.5
219	10	"Dud Bowl II"	Gerry Cohen	Kim Weiskopf	November 26, 1995	1009	11.6
—	—	"Special: Al Bundy's Sports Spectacular"	William Brown	Paul Wales	November 26, 1995	—	9.2
220	11	"Bearly Men"	Gerry Cohen	Russell Marcus	December 3, 1995	1010	15.3
221	12	"Love Conquers Al"	Amanda Bearse	Paul Corrigan & Brad Walsh	December 10, 1995	1013	13.2
222	13	"I Can't Believe It's Butter"	Sam W. Orender	Scott Zimbler & Joel Valentincic	December 17, 1995	1012	13.2
223	14	"The Hood, the Bud and the Kelly: Part 1"	Gerry Cohen	Dvora Inwood	January 7, 1996	1014	15.7
224	15	"The Hood, the Bud and the Kelly: Part 2"	Gerry Cohen	Dan O'Keefe	January 14, 1996	1015	12.6
225	16	"Calendar Girl"	Amanda Bearse	Fran E. Kaufer	February 4, 1996	1016	14.1
226	17	"The Agony and the Extra C"	Sam W. Orender	Jimmy Aleck & Jim Keily	February 11, 1996	1019	15.2
227	18	"Spring Break: Part 1"	Gerry Cohen	Kim Weiskopf	February 18, 1996	1017	14.0
228	19	"Spring Break: Part 2"	Gerry Cohen	Calvin Brown, Jr.	February 25, 1996	1018	13.4
229	20	"Turning Japanese"	Sam W. Orender	Fran E. Kaufer	March 17, 1996	1020	12.2
230	21	"Al Goes to the Dogs"	Sam W. Orender	Garry Bowren & Laurie Lee-Goss	March 24, 1996	1022	12.3
231	22	"Enemies"	Gerry Cohen	Richard Gurman & Stacie Lipp & Russell Marcus	April 14, 1996	1024	10.8
232	23	"Bud Hits the Books"	Sam W. Orender	Stacie Lipp	April 28, 1996	1021	9.7
233	24	"Kiss of the Coffee Woman"	Sam W. Orender	Story by : Todd Newman; Teleplay by : Dvora Inwood	May 5, 1996	1023	11.9
234	25	"Torch Song Duet"	Gerry Cohen	Donelle Q. Buck	May 19, 1996	1025	13.7
235	26	"The Joke's on Al"	Amanda Bearse	Calvin Brown, Jr.	May 19, 1996	1026	13.4

=== Season 11 (1996–97) ===
The 11th season was the final season of Married... with Children. Fox moved the show's time slot several times throughout the course of the season, which cost the show ratings. Rising production costs and decreasing viewer shares led to the show's cancellation in April 1997, after the final taping for season 11. This was the only season to feature teaser scenes before the opening credits, and a few episodes during this season also featured tag scenes just before the closing credits. For this season, the still of Al and Peggy sitting on the couch was dropped from the closing credits, which for most episodes this season are shown against a black background and in a separate card format, instead of scrolling. The opening theme was also greatly shortened, dropping the highway scenes taken from National Lampoon's Vacation, and the scene where Al hands every member of his family money.

No. overall	No. in season	Title	Directed by	Written by	Original release date	Prod. code	U.S. viewers (millions)
236	1	"Twisted"	Gerry Cohen	Richard Gurman	September 28, 1996	11.03	8.3
237	2	"Children of the Corns"	Amanda Bearse	Matthew Berry & Eric Abrams	October 5, 1996	11.02	7.4
238	3	"Kelly's Gotta Habit"	Amanda Bearse	Laurie Lee-Goss & Garry Bowren	October 12, 1996	11.06	6.7
239	4	"Requiem for a Chevyweight: Part 1"	Gerry Cohen	Steve Faber & Bob Fisher	November 10, 1996	11.07	13.3
240	5	"Requiem for a Chevyweight: Part 2"	Amanda Bearse	Russell Marcus	November 17, 1996	11.09	9.1
241	6	"A Bundy Thanksgiving"	Amanda Bearse	Vince Cheung & Ben Montanio	November 24, 1996	11.11	10.1
242	7	"The Juggs Have Left the Building"	Gerry Cohen	Vince Cheung & Ben Montanio	December 1, 1996	11.08	8.5
243	8	"God Help Ye Merry Bundymen"	Amanda Bearse	Steve Faber & Bob Fisher	December 22, 1996	11.13	8.9
244	9	"Crimes Against Obesity"	Amanda Bearse	Russell Marcus	December 29, 1996	11.05	12.4
245	10	"The Stepford Peg"	Amanda Bearse	Valerie Ahern & Christian McLaughlin	January 6, 1997	11.01	7.78
246	11	"Bud on the Side"	Sam W. Orender	Valerie Ahern & Christian McLaughlin	January 13, 1997	11.10	8.17
247	12	"Grime and Punishment"	Sam W. Orender	Steve Faber & Bob Fisher	January 20, 1997	11.04	6.87
248	13	"T*R*A*S*H"	Amanda Bearse	Story by : Todd Newman & David Faustino; Teleplay by : Terry Maloney & Mindy Morgenstern	January 27, 1997	11.14	7.12
249	14	"Breaking Up Is Easy to Do: Part 1"	Mark K. Samuels	Eric Abrams & Matthew Berry	February 24, 1997	11.16	11.85
250	15	"Breaking Up Is Easy to Do: Part 2"	Gerry Cohen	Russell Marcus	February 24, 1997	11.17	11.85
251	16	"Breaking Up Is Easy to Do: Part 3"	Gerry Cohen	Russell Marcus	March 3, 1997	11.18	10.11
252	17	"Live Nude Peg"	Amanda Bearse	Matthew Berry & Eric Abrams	March 10, 1997	11.12	9.71
253	18	"A Babe in Toyland"	Gerry Cohen	Valerie Ahern & Christian McLaughlin	March 17, 1997	11.15	7.77
254	19	"Birthday Boy Toy"	Gerry Cohen	Terry Maloney & Mindy Morgenstern	March 31, 1997	11.19	9.12
255	20	"Damn Bundys"	Richard Correll	Ben Montanio & Vince Cheung	April 28, 1997	11.20	9.73
256	21	"Lez Be Friends"	Gerry Cohen	Pamela Eells	April 28, 1997	11.22	10.17
257	22	"The Desperate Half-Hour"	Gerry Cohen	Valerie Ahern & Christian McLaughlin	May 5, 1997	11.23	15.20
258	23	"How to Marry a Moron"	Gerry Cohen	Story by : Vince Cheung & Ben Montanio; Teleplay by : Russell Marcus & Pamela Eells	May 5, 1997	11.24	15.20
259	24	"Chicago Shoe Exchange"	Mark K. Samuels	Matthew Berry & Eric Abrams	June 9, 1997	11.21	6.26

== Specials ==
Airdate	Title	Station
December 12, 1986 (taping date)	"Unaired Pilot"	Unaired
January 1, 1998	Bundymania	ProSieben (Germany)
August 26, 2001	Married... with Children: The E! True Hollywood Story	E!
February 16, 2003	Married... with Children Reunion	Fox
July 10, 2010	Married... with Children Bio	Bio
April 22, 2012	Fox 25th Anniversary	Fox
April 23, 2012	The Cast of Married With Children: Where Are They Now!	TV Guide Network

Bundymania was a three-hour-and-forty-five-minute special airing nine dubbed German episodes of the series. The special included interviews with David Faustino, Christina Applegate, Ted McGinley, dog trainer Steven Ritt, Amanda Bearse, and Ed O'Neill.
