= Married... with Children season 2 =

1987–88 season of American TV series

Married... with Children
- Season 2
- DVD cover
- Showrunners: Ron Leavitt; Michael G. Moye
- Starring: Ed O'Neill; Katey Sagal; David Garrison; Amanda Bearse; Christina Applegate; David Faustino
- No. of episodes: 22

Release
- Original network: Fox
- Original release: September 27, 1987 – May 1, 1988

Season chronology
- ← Previous; Season 1 Next → Season 3

This is a list of episodes for the second season (1987–88) of the television series Married... with Children. The season aired on Fox from September 27, 1987, to May 1, 1988.

At the beginning of this season, Kelly is portrayed as a girl of reasonable intelligence (though she is often teased by Bud for her promiscuity and bleached hair). By the end, however, her character obtains her trademark stupidity that will become both a plot device and comic focus for the rest of the series. This season also contains the first use of the "Bundy Cheer" and the first instance of the Bundys leaving Chicago to go on vacation. Although Buck is portrayed in later seasons as having been with the Bundys since he was a pup, it's implied by Peg that they've had him for only three years and Al states that he's actually Bud's pet; he even "speaks" once ("Buck Can Do It"), something that becomes a regular feature beginning in the fourth season. Michael Faustino (David's younger brother), makes the first of five guest appearances during the course of the series.

The actor, singer, and drag queen Divine was scheduled to tape a guest appearance on March 7, 1988, as Uncle Otto in the second season wrap-up episode "All in the Family". After spending all the previous day at Sunset Gower Studios for rehearsals, Divine returned to his hotel that evening, where he dined with friends at the hotel restaurant before returning to his room. Shortly before midnight, he died in his sleep, at age 42, of an enlarged heart. In the episode, Divine's role was played by James 'Gypsy' Haake and the credits ended with "This episode is dedicated to the memory of Divine 1945–1988".

Amanda Bearse, Christina Applegate and David Garrison each missed two episodes this season.

== Episodes ==
No. overall	No. in season	Title	Directed by	Written by	Original release date	Prod. code	Rating (households)
14	1	"Poppy's by the Tree"	Linda Day	Michael G. Moye & Ron Leavitt	September 27, 1987	202	3.7
15	2	"Poppy's by the Tree"	Linda Day	Michael G. Moye & Ron Leavitt	September 27, 1987	203	3.7
The Bundys take a vacation to Dumpwater, Florida, where they are stalked by a serial axe murderer on the loose. Note: This is the first episode of the series not to have a still shot of Al and Peg on the couch during the end credits.
16	3	"If I Were a Rich Man"	Linda Day	Sandy Sprung & Marcy Vosburgh	October 4, 1987	204	2.7
After a million dollars is reported missing from Steve's bank, Peggy and the kids assume that Al stole the money so that they can finally be rich.
17	4	"Buck Can Do It"	Linda Day	Michael G. Moye & Ron Leavitt	October 11, 1987	201	5.8
When news hits of the neighborhood dogs getting pregnant by Buck (who's been escaping through the hole in the Bundys' fence that Al hasn't bothered to repair), their neighbor, Pittman, threatens to sue them because Buck impregnated his thoroughbred poodle. Peg and Marcy conclude that Buck should be neutered, and even Bud is perfectly okay with it. Al, however, has second thoughts after having a dream where a walking, talking and beer-drinking Buck (played by Derek McGrath) is angry at Al for not doing enough to stop this. When two killers who resemble the horror franchises characters of Leatherface and Jason Voorhees arrive, and Buck won't attack them to save Al, Al realizes he must distract Peg from taking Buck to the vet by telling her he's in the mood for sex. Note: Christina Applegate does not appear in this episode.
18	5	"Girls Just Wanna Have Fun"	Linda Day	Tracy Gamble & Richard Vaczy	October 18, 1987	206	5.5
19	6	"Girls Just Wanna Have Fun"	Linda Day	Tracy Gamble & Richard Vaczy	October 18, 1987	207	5.5
After arguing with Steve over ogling at a sexy repairwoman, Marcy goes with Peg to a male strip club, where Marcy loses her wedding ring inside the pants of one of the dancers (Billy Hufsey). While Al discovers that Peg has been spending her time (and his money) at the male strip club, Marcy struggles not to tell Steve where her wedding ring is, until the male dancer Marcy was with comes to the Rhoades' house to bring it back.
20	7	"For Whom the Bell Tolls"	Linda Day	Richard Gurman & Katherine Green	October 25, 1987	205	3.7
The Bundys struggle with not having phone service after Al refuses to pay for an international phone call to Canada. Al is also furious about the street light installed in the neighborhood, which shines directly on his face at night.
21	8	"Born to Walk"	Linda Day	John Vorhaus	November 1, 1987	208	4.0
Kelly passes her driver's test, while Al fails his. Meanwhile, Steve develops an unhealthy obsession with betting on horse races.
22	9	"Alley of the Dolls"	Linda Day	Sandy Sprung & Marcy Vosburgh	November 8, 1987	209	4.8
Al and the kids (with the unwilling help of Steve and Marcy) bowl against Peggy's high school rival and her family.
23	10	"The Razor's Edge"	Gerry Cohen	Ellen L. Fogle	November 15, 1987	210	N/A
When Steve refuses to shave his beard and Marcy refuses to have sex with him, this leads the Rhoades to have a major fight which ultimately see Steve move in with the Bundys. Since Steve cooks and cleans, Al doesn't want him to move back. Peg, however, becomes jealous of Steve receiving all of Al's attention and wants him to move back. So, Al and Peg start manipulating both Steve and Marcy to serve their individual needs, eventually bringing them both back together.
24	11	"How Do You Spell Revenge?"	Linda Day	Ralph R. Farquhar	November 22, 1987	211	5.0
Al tries to recruit Kelly onto his baseball team to replace Peg, but Kelly is in love with a boy who wants her to get a tattoo. The boy's father also turns out to be Peg's ex-boyfriend. Note: David Garrison and Amanda Bearse do not appear in this episode.
25	12	"Earth Angel"	Linda Day	Ellen L. Fogle	December 6, 1987	212	4.0
A pretty, blond aspiring artist (Dawn Merrick) stays with the Bundys and makes life for everyone better - except for Marcy. A bitter Marcy then plots to get rid of her out of spite.
26	13	"You Better Watch Out"	Linda Day	Katherine Green & Richard Gurman	December 20, 1987	213	3.9
A Christmas stunt at the Lakeside Mall opening goes horribly awry when the man playing Santa crash-lands in the Bundys' yard and dies. Al must then deal with the crowd of kids who still believe in Santa Claus. Michael Faustino, Mike Hagerty and David Ruprecht guest-star.
27	14	"Guys and Dolls"	Linda Day	Sandy Sprung & Marcy Vosburgh	January 10, 1988	214	4.3
To curb Bud's destructive behavior after Bud gets in trouble for using a picture of Kelly in a bikini for a school project, Al and Steve convince Bud to take up baseball card-collecting as a hobby. However, the men get caught up in the hobby themselves, leading them to eventually sell Marcy's collectible Barbie doll in order to get the money for some rare baseball cards. A furious Peg and Marcy then order their husbands to get the doll back.
28	15	"Build a Better Mousetrap"	Linda Day	Story by : J. Stanford Parker; Teleplay by : Michael G. Moye & Ron Leavitt	January 24, 1988	215	5.1
A mouse is running loose in the Bundy house, prompting Peg to face her childhood fear of mice and prompting Al to wreck the house in his attempt to catch the pest.
29	16	"Master the Possibilities"	Linda Day	Michael G. Moye & Ron Leavitt	February 7, 1988	216	5.0
Al discovers a way out of his financial problems when, after Marcy tells him that you can legally keep and use anything that's been sent to you, he finds out that a credit card has been sent to Buck the dog. This prompts Al and Peg to use the card under Buck's name, which works out well - at first. Note: Christina Applegate does not appear in this episode. The non-appearance is written off as Kelly staying with Peg's mom and going out on a "double date" (which, for Kelly, is her dating two guys simultaneously).
30	17	"Peggy Loves Al, Yeah, Yeah, Yeah"	Gerry Cohen	Ralph R. Farquhar	February 14, 1988	217	4.7
On Valentine's Day, Bud awaits his first Valentine (which he thinks is a prank cooked up by Kelly), while Kelly must choose one Valentine from the many boys who are attracted to her. Meanwhile, Steve plans to take Marcy to Hawaii, Marcy plans to pop out from a cake naked, and Peg wants Al to say "I love you" to her.
31	18	"The Great Escape"	Linda Day	Ellen L. Fogle	February 21, 1988	218	5.7
Kelly is grounded for getting poor grades in school and must stay with her family at the shoe store overnight while the house is being fumigated for termites, prompting Kelly to plan an escape so she can attend a concert with her friends. Note: David Garrison and Amanda Bearse do not appear in this episode.
32	19	"Impo-Dent"	Gerry Cohen	Sandy Sprung & Marcy Vosburgh	February 28, 1988	219	5.3
While Steve is away, Marcy drives Steve's new Mercedes (without his permission) and crashes it. When Steve finds out, he becomes impotent and fails to satisfy Marcy in bed. A sinister plan between Al and Steve unfolds later.
33	20	"Just Married... with Children"	Linda Day	Ellen L. Fogle	March 6, 1988	220	4.6
Al and Peg pose as Steve and Marcy to get on a game show called How Do I Love Thee?, but find themselves facing off against the real Steve and Marcy (who are on the game show posing as Al and Peg). Note: Ed O'Neill's wife Catherine Rusoff appears as Mona, the wife from the other couple Al and Peg face in the game show.
34	21	"Father Lode"	Linda Day	Jerry Perzigian	March 13, 1988	221	5.7
Al tries to keep his racetrack winnings a secret, while Peg starts sneaking money from Al's wallet.
35	22	"All in the Family"	Linda Day	Marcy Vosburgh & Sandy Sprung	May 1, 1988	222	6.0
Al has a nightmare when Peg informs him that her insane relatives are visiting.

== Sources ==
- Kaltenbach, Chris (March 24, 2009). "Frances Milstead, mother of Divine, dies at 88". The Baltimore Sun.
- Milstead, Frances; Heffernan, Kevin; Yeager, Steve (2001). My Son Divine. Los Angeles and New York: Alyson Books. ISBN 978-1-55583-594-1.
