= Married... with Children season 4 =

1989–90 season of American TV series

Married... with Children
- Season 4
- DVD cover
- Showrunners: Ron Leavitt; Michael G. Moye
- Starring: Ed O'Neill; Katey Sagal; David Garrison; Amanda Bearse; Christina Applegate; David Faustino
- No. of episodes: 23

Release
- Original network: Fox
- Original release: September 3, 1989 – May 13, 1990

Season chronology
- ← Previous; Season 3 Next → Season 5

The fourth season of the television series Married... with Children aired on Fox from September 3, 1989, to May 13, 1990.

== Plot ==
This season saw the departure of Marcy's husband Steve Rhoades. Marcy remained single for the remainder of the season. This was also the first season where the audience would applaud when a major character would enter a scene for the first time in the episode, the first time that Buck "speaks", as well as a Bundyesque of the classic film It's a Wonderful Life. In the episode "It's a Bundyful Life (Part 2)," Ted McGinley makes a guest appearance as Norman Jablonsky before reappearing as a regular cast member in the next season as Jefferson D'Arcy. Also, Michael Faustino makes his third guest appearance.

David Garrison missed two episodes this season. Amanda Bearse also missed one episode.

This would also be the final season for writers Marcy Vosburgh & Sandy Sprung.

== Episodes ==
No. overall	No. in season	Title	Directed by	Written by	Original release date	Prod. code	U.S. viewers (millions)
58	1	"Hot Off the Grill"	Gerry Cohen	Story by : Gabrielle Topping; Teleplay by : Michael G. Moye & Ron Leavitt	September 3, 1989	401	17.9
Al has a Labor Day barbecue, where he becomes aroused by the sight of Peg actually doing housework. Meanwhile, Steve and Marcy bring along the ashes of Marcy's aunt, whom Steve hated.
59	2	"Dead Men Don't Do Aerobics"	Gerry Cohen	Katherine Green	September 10, 1989	402	22.2
Peggy wins the chance to exercise with Jim Jupiter, a local aerobics instructor with his own TV show, for two weeks. However, she ends up killing Jim by introducing him to the world of smoking, eating junk food, and watching TV.
60	3	"Buck Saves the Day"	Gerry Cohen	Marcy Vosburgh & Sandy Sprung	September 24, 1989	403	17.3
To earn money for a concert, Bud rents out Al as a professional woodsman who takes the neighborhood kids (and Steve and Bud) on a camping trip, and the trip turns into such a disaster that Al sends Buck home to get someone to rescue them. Meanwhile, Kelly earns money for the same concert by fleecing Peggy's friends at poker.
61	4	"Tooth or Consequences"	Gerry Cohen	Story by : Will Rogers; Teleplay by : Sheldon Krasner & David Saling	October 1, 1989	404	20.4
Al gets a toothache and goes to a dentist (played by former SCTV cast member Joe Flaherty), who is extremely bitter over his wife divorcing him and his sexy dental hygienist assistant (played by former porn star Traci Lords) spending his money.
62	5	"He Ain't Much But He's Mine"	Gerry Cohen	Lisa Rosenthal	October 8, 1989	405	21.3
Peg thinks a new customer at the hair salon may be having an affair with Al, leading her to become jealous.
63	6	"Fair Exchange"	Gerry Cohen	Al Aidekman	October 29, 1989	406	21.5
The Bundys learn that they can earn $500 a month for hosting a French foreign exchange student. But the beautiful French girl, Yvette (Milla Jovovich), soon turns Kelly's social life into famine, which prompts Kelly to take action in order to get her own social life back.
64	7	"Desperately Seeking Miss October"	Gerry Cohen	Arthur Silver & Steve Bing	November 5, 1989	407	19.1
When Al recognizes a female customer at the shoe store as Playboy Magazine's Miss October (starring Brandi Brandt as herself, Playboy's Playmate of the Month for October 1987), Al goes searching for his old issues of Playboy, only to find out that Peg sold them all to buy a good luck charm named Tubro. After a dream in which he is inspired by the spirit of his father, Al finally stands up to Peg and makes her get all the Playboys back.
65	8	"976-SHOE"	Gerry Cohen	Sandy Sprung & Marcy Vosburgh	November 12, 1989	408	18.7
Al asks Steve for a loan of $50,000 so he can finance his own shoe help hotline. To win a Hawaii trip, Steve sanctions it and ends up with a warning from his boss that he will be fired if Al does not come through with results. To save his job, Marcy gives Al a second $50,000 loan to pay back Steve, but Al spends that on his shoe hotlinet as well. Eventually, Al's phone line goes belly-up, costing Steve his job at the bank, and Marcy gets demoted to drive up window teller.
66	9	"Oh, What a Feeling"	Gerry Cohen	Ron Leavitt & Michael G. Moye	November 19, 1989	409	20.3
Al decides to finally get a new car, but finds out that Peggy spent all his saved-up money that he buried in the backyard. Note: Amanda Bearse and David Garrison do not appear in this episode.
67	10	"At the Zoo"	Gerry Cohen	Katherine Green	November 26, 1989	410	18.9
Steve begins spending his time taking Peg, Kelly, and Bud to the zoo instead of looking for a job, which doesn't sit well with the recently-demoted Marcy.
68	11	"It's a Bundyful Life: Parts 1 & 2"	Gerry Cohen	Michael G. Moye & Ron Leavitt	December 17, 1989	412	31.4
69	12	"It's a Bundyful Life: Parts 1 & 2"	Gerry Cohen	Michael G. Moye & Ron Leavitt	December 17, 1989	413	31.4
Al promises his family a wonderful Christmas when he reveals that he put money away in a Christmas club account, but fails to get it when the bank closes early for a party. After Peg and the kids blow off Al to have Christmas dinner at Denny's, Al is stuck at home fixing the Christmas lights (which almost electrocute him), and meets a loud, obnoxious guardian angel (Sam Kinison) who shows Al what life would be like if Al was never born.
70	13	"Who'll Stop the Rain"	Gerry Cohen	Kevin Curran	January 7, 1990	411	20.1
During a rainstorm, Al tries to fix the roof and the TV antenna. Meanwhile, Marcy is upset when Steve gets a new job at a pet store and she ends up getting bitten by one of his "pets."
71	14	"A Taxing Problem"	Gerry Cohen	Paul Diamond	January 14, 1990	415	23.6
Al is faced with an audit following some "creative accounting" done by Peg (believing that she could get more money for 23 kids if claiming 2 children as dependents got them $200), and plots to sell Peggy's hair to a desperate woman in order to pay the owed tax money.
72	15	"Rock and Roll Girl"	Linda Day	Ellen L. Fogle	February 4, 1990	414	22.6
Al challenges the family to go out and make their own money so he doesn't get shaken down for his meager change every allowance day, prompting Peg to open her own tollbooth and Kelly to get a job as eye candy in a rock video by The Gutter Cats (guest starring as themselves). Note: This was David Garrison's final episode as a series regular.
73	16	"You Gotta Know When to Hold 'Em: Part 1"	Gerry Cohen	Sioux Doanham	February 11, 1990	416	23.1
Part one of two: Marcy stays at the Bundys' after Steve leaves her to pursue his dream of being a forest ranger, prompting Peg to take Marcy to Las Vegas to cheer her up — but not before selling Al's TV and maxing out his credit cards to pay for the trip.
74	17	"You Gotta Know When to Hold 'Em: Part 2"	Gerry Cohen	Kevin Curran	February 18, 1990	417	25.2
Conclusion: Al, Kelly, and Bud track down Marcy and Peg in Vegas, who are desperately trying to raise money to get home — and sign Al up in a wrestling match against Big Bad Mama in order to earn the money.
75	18	"What Goes Around Came Around"	Gerry Cohen	Ellen L. Fogle	February 25, 1990	418	26.1
Bud tries to make amends with a girl (played by Saved by the Bell's Tiffani-Amber Thiessen) who once humiliated him in sixth grade. Meanwhile, Al is chosen to speak at the homecoming dance and uses it as a chance to speak out against the dangers of marriage.
76	19	"Peggy Turns 300"	Tony Singletary	Katherine Green	March 25, 1990	420	28.2
Al plans a special evening for Peg's birthday by taking her out to the Bowlarama, where he hopes to finally beat his arch rival's high game score. However, Peg bowls a perfect game and destroys Al's self-esteem.
77	20	"Peggy Made a Little Lamb"	Gerry Cohen	Ellen L. Fogle	April 15, 1990	421	28.6
While going through her high school memorabilia, Peggy discovers that she never passed home economics class in high school and must make up the lost credit by going to Kelly's Home Economics class.
78	21	"Rain Girl"	Gerry Cohen	Kevin Curran	April 29, 1990	419	27.1
Kelly gets an internship at Channel 83's local news station, which turns into a $250,000-a-year paid position when the executives look to her for a way to boost ratings.
79	22	"The Agony of De Feet"	Gerry Cohen	Diane Burroughs & Joey Gutierrez	May 6, 1990	422	25.0
Kelly tricks Marcy into thinking she slept with Bud, after Marcy scares off Kelly's date and off-handedly calls her a "simpleton". Meanwhile, Al, who lately has been freaking out over feet, is chosen to be a judge in an odd beauty pageant.
80	23	"Yard Sale"	Gerry Cohen	Marcy Vosburgh & Sandy Sprung	May 13, 1990	423	25.5
When Al discovers that Peg has been spending money on old junk from yard sales, the Bundys decide to have one of their own — which then turns it into a cheap carnival when no one buys what they're selling.
