= Married... with Children season 5 =

1990–91 season of American TV series

Married... with Children
- Season 5
- DVD cover
- Showrunners: Ron Leavitt; Michael G. Moye
- Starring: Ed O'Neill; Katey Sagal; Amanda Bearse; Christina Applegate; David Faustino; Ted McGinley
- No. of episodes: 25

Release
- Original network: Fox
- Original release: September 23, 1990 – May 19, 1991

Season chronology
- ← Previous; Season 4 Next → Season 6

This is a list of episodes for the fifth season (1990–91) of the television series Married... with Children. The season aired on Fox from September 23, 1990, to May 19, 1991.

In the middle of the fifth season, Marcy awakes next to Jefferson D'Arcy and discovers that she is now married to him. The season includes the first appearance of Al's favorite show (Psycho Dad), and the first mention of his four touchdowns in a single game.

Katey Sagal was absent for one episode. Amanda Bearse also missed two episodes.

== Episodes ==
No. overall	No. in season	Title	Directed by	Written by	Original release date	Prod. code	U.S. viewers (millions)
81	1	"We'll Follow the Sun"	Gerry Cohen	Ron Leavitt & Michael G. Moye	September 23, 1990	502	19.3
Looking to spend more time with his family, Al takes the Bundys on a Labor Day drive, which comes to a premature end when they get stuck in a massive traffic jam.
82	2	"Al... with Kelly"	Gerry Cohen	Story by : Gabrielle Topping; Teleplay by : Stacie Lipp	September 30, 1990	501	22.8
Al and Kelly fake getting sick in order to get out of having to visit Peg's mother for the week. With both Peg and Bud gone, Al begins to fantasize about two blonde women who fight over him (played by Pamela Anderson and Beckie Mullen) — but things get sticky when Kelly really does come down with a cold and needs her father to care for her. Note: Amanda Bearse does not appear in this episode
83	3	"Sue Casa, His Casa"	Gerry Cohen	Kevin Curran	October 7, 1990	503	19.8
After Al refuses to get insurance for his car, Bud and Kelly get into an accident with a man in a Mercedes. The Mercedes owner then sues them for a million dollars, leading the Bundys to counter-sue him for a "jillion" dollars using fake injuries and Marcy's testimony.
84	4	"The Unnatural"	Gerry Cohen	Katherine Green	October 14, 1990	504	21.9
Al is replaced by a more professional softball player during the championship game. When the new player is injured, Al takes over.
85	5	"The Dance Show"	Gerry Cohen	Arthur Silver	October 21, 1990	505	23.5
Peg meets a handsome man (Sam McMurray) at a dance club, while Al meets the handsome man's husband (played by Simpsons voice actor Dan Castellaneta). Unknowing that the handsome man is homosexual, Peg flirts with him. Meanwhile, his husband cooks a nice meal for Al.
86	6	"Kelly Bounces Back"	Gerry Cohen	Al Aidekman	October 28, 1990	506	20.9
Kelly auditions for the role of spokesmodel for the new Allanté with the "Bundy Bounce," but her idea is stolen by one of her rivals (Tia Carrere). Meanwhile, Peg refuses to do housework until Al realizes that he needs her.
87	7	"Married... with Aliens"	Gerry Cohen	Ellen L. Fogle	November 4, 1990	507	20.9
After a severe head injury, Al begins to see aliens who steal his socks, which they need to fuel their ships to stop a cosmic disaster, but everyone else thinks Al is going insane.
88	8	"Wabbit Season"	Gerry Cohen	Ron Leavitt & Michael G. Moye	November 11, 1990	508	18.9
After suffering a nervous breakdown at work during a midnight sale, Al gets into gardening to relieve his stress, but soon finds himself at war with a rabbit stealing his carrots, causing chaos for the Bundys and Marcy in the process.
89	9	"Do Ya Think I'm Sexy"	Gerry Cohen	Kevin Curran	November 18, 1990	509	20.4
Al becomes obsessed with his appearance after the neighborhood women begin admiring his handyman skills. Al then undergoes a makeover for himself as a handsome and confident person, but his new and improved appearance and attitude becomes troubling to Peg and the kids, who don't know how to react to this; not so much that Al is being a nice person for once in his life, but because that his behavior is very unlike Al.
90	10	"One Down, Two to Go"	Gerry Cohen	Ralph R. Farquhar	November 25, 1990	510	24.2
Kelly moves out after Al kicks out one of her boyfriends. While Al revels in one of his kids leaving, Peg worries that she wasn't a good mother and begins severely coddling Bud.
91	11	"And Baby Makes Money"	Gerry Cohen	Art Everett	December 16, 1990	511	17.6
Following the death and funeral of Al's uncle, Stymie Bundy (the only male Bundy relative who was single and wealthy), Al and Peg begin having sex so they can be the first to inherit Stymie's $500,000 inheritance by bearing a Bundy child born in wedlock. But Peg, who doesn't want to get pregnant again, secretly begins taking birth control pills.
92	12	"Married... with Who"	Gerry Cohen	Ellen L. Fogle	January 6, 1991	512	20.8
After a wild night at a banker convention, Marcy wakes up and discovers that she's now married to a strange man named Jefferson D'Arcy (Ted McGinley) with a dark past -- and things get worse when Marcy and Jefferson put their trust in Al and Peg for a proper wedding.
93	13	"The Godfather"	Gerry Cohen	Ralph R. Farquhar	February 3, 1991	514	20.1
Al discovers that Kelly is dating an older man, but when the older man turns out to be connected to the local government, Al takes advantage of the situation by becoming the neighborhood "Godfather".
94	14	"Look Who's Barking"	Gerry Cohen	Katherine Green	February 10, 1991	513	18.6
Buck the dog (voiced by Cheech Marin in this episode) runs away and takes home a white female dog who plots to replace him as the family pet. Meanwhile, Al searches for his favorite cheesecake. B.B. King makes a cameo appearance as a street musician. Note: Katey Sagal does not appear in this episode
95	15	"A Man's Castle"	Gerry Cohen	Stacie Lipp	February 17, 1991	515	10.2
Peg spends the family's grocery money on tuition to an interior decorating class, where one of her projects is to beautify Al's personal bathroom in the garage. This leads Al to literally faint when he sees his prized Ferguson toilet adorned with pink colored fabric. Note: Amanda Bearse does not appear in this episode.
96	16	"All Night Security Dude"	Gerry Cohen	Glenn Eichler & Peter Gaffney	February 24, 1991	516	20.7
Al gets a night job as a school security guard, but gets fired when the beloved football trophy gets stolen while Al was in the bathroom. It's up to Al to get the trophy back from former high school football rival "Spare Tire" Dixon (guest star Bubba Smith). Note: Ed O'Neill has admitted this episode is his favorite of the series.
97	17	"Oldies But Young 'Uns"	Gerry Cohen	Bill Prady	March 17, 1991	518	16.7
Al becomes obsessed with trying to remember the name of a song he hears on the radio. Meanwhile, Kelly dates Vinnie (guest star Matt LeBlanc), who turns out to be the not-so-bright son of Al's old high school friend, Charlie (guest star Joseph Bologna).
98	18	"Weenie Tot Lovers & Other Strangers"	Gerry Cohen	Kevin Curran	March 24, 1991	517	18.7
Kelly competes for the chance to be a spokesmodel for Al's favorite food company, Weenie Tots.
99	19	"Kids! Wadaya Gonna Do?"	Linda Day	Ellen L. Fogle	April 7, 1991	521	19.0
While Marcy, Jefferson, Al and Peg have a movie night at the D'Arcy house, Kelly is tricked by Bud into babysitting a group of rowdy kids while Bud goes to a concert.
100	20	"Top of the Heap"	Gerry Cohen	Ron Leavitt & Arthur Silver	April 7, 1991	525	18.0
In this special 100th episode (which only features Al Bundy in a small cameo), Al's divorced and unemployed friend Charlie Verducci (Joseph Bologna) and his dim-witted teenage son Vinnie (Matt LeBlanc), try to fit in with snobs at a high-class party, where Charlie hopes that Vinnie will meet and marry a debutante. Note: This is the backdoor pilot episode for the short-lived spin-off series Top of the Heap.
101	21	"You Better Shop Around: Part 1"	Linda Day	John Brancato and Michael Ferris	April 14, 1991	519	21.3
Part one of two: During a heatwave, Al buys a cheap, WWII-era air conditioner that ultimately blows the entire neighborhood's power. With the neighbors angry, the Bundys move to the local grocery store, Foodie's, where they become winners of a $1,000 shopping spree, after cutting ahead of Marcy at the checkout. Note: Ted McGinley does not appear in this episode
102	22	"You Better Shop Around: Part 2"	Linda Day	Stacie Lipp	April 21, 1991	520	23.1
Conclusion: Al and Peg compete against Marcy and Jefferson in a supermarket shopping spree, where both couples attempt to sabotage the other, with comical results. Meanwhile, Bud and Kelly harass the host of the spree — Jerry Mathers of Leave It to Beaver fame.
103	23	"Route 666: Part 1"	Gerry Cohen	Katherine Green	April 28, 1991	522	16.5
Part one of two: While on a road trip to Los Angeles for a shoe convention, the Bundys' car breaks down in a backwards, New Mexico town, where an old prospector (John Byner) gives Al a map to a gold mine.
104	24	"Route 666: Part 2"	Gerry Cohen	Ralph R. Farquhar	May 5, 1991	523	20.7
Conclusion: After roping in Marcy and Jefferson, the Bundys go on an expedition to dig for gold, but their greed and insanity slowly begin to tear them apart. Eventually, they find out that the gold mine is actually a local tourist attraction loaded with fool's gold. Not willing to accept defeat, the Bundys and the D'Arcys then proceed to rob the tourists of their watches and jewelry before relaxing on a beach in California.
105	25	"Buck the Stud"	Gerry Cohen	Chip Johannessen & John Rinker	May 19, 1991	524	16.6
Al trains Buck to mate with a neighbor's female dog for $10,000. Meanwhile, Bud begins to dress up in foppish clothes in order to attract women.
