= Married... with Children season 1 =

1987 season of American TV series

Married... with Children
- Season 1
- DVD cover
- Showrunners: Ron Leavitt; Michael G. Moye
- Starring: Ed O'Neill; Katey Sagal; David Garrison; Amanda Bearse; Christina Applegate; David Faustino
- No. of episodes: 13

Release
- Original network: Fox
- Original release: April 5 – June 28, 1987

Season chronology
- Next → Season 2

This is a list of episodes for the premiere season (1987) of the television series Married... with Children. The season aired on Fox from April 5 to June 28, 1987.

This season introduces the major characters: Al, Peg, Kelly and Bud Bundy, along with their neighbors, Steve and Marcy Rhoades. The first season is the only one in which Al and Peg are regularly intimate, to the point of Al initiating the sessions. It is also the only one where Peg can be seen doing housework under normal circumstances, and she even has her own car (as seen in "Sixteen Years and What Do You Get"). In "Thinergy," Bud mentions that Kelly had been held back a year in school. Al's dislike of the French is first shown in this season and it is also the first time that he calls Marcy a "chicken." It also contains the first mention of Peg's family being "hillbillies" from the fictional Wanker County, Wisconsin. Christina Applegate and David Faustino missed one episode in this season.

== Original pilot ==
In the show's pilot episode, Tina Caspary played the role of Kelly Bundy, while Hunter Carson played Bud. Before the series aired publicly – and at the behest of Ed O'Neill – the roles for the two Bundy children were re-cast. O'Neill felt a lack of chemistry with the original actors cast as the children. He requested a re-cast, which the producers approved. All of the scenes in the original pilot were re-shot with the replacement actors, Christina Applegate and David Faustino.

== Episodes ==
No. overall	No. in season	Title	Directed by	Written by	Original release date	Prod. code	Rating/share (households)
1	1	"Pilot"	Linda Day	Ron Leavitt & Michael G. Moye	April 5, 1987	1.01	6.1/10
A down-on-his-luck shoe salesman named Al Bundy, unhappily married with two children, is forced to choose between going to a basketball game or joining his lazy wife, Peggy, in meeting their new neighbors, Steve and Marcy Rhoades, a happy, young couple who have moved in next door and are the epitome of 1980s social climbing and greed. Note: On April 22, 2012, Fox reaired the series premiere in honor of its 25th anniversary. The reaired pilot had 2.9 million viewers.
2	2	"Thinergy"	Linda Day	Michael G. Moye & Ron Leavitt	April 12, 1987	1.02	5.2/8
Inspired by a diet book from Marcy and hoping to improve her sex life, Peg decides the entire family should be eating healthier and starts them on a strict diet, much to the dismay of the family, mostly Al.
3	3	"But I Didn't Shoot the Deputy"	Linda Day	Ron Burla	April 19, 1987	1.04	N/A
The neighborhood has a local robber on the loose. After Steve and Marcy are robbed, they buy a guard dog in the hopes of protecting themselves, while Al decides to buy a gun instead. One night during a perceived invasion, however, Al accidentally shoots the Rhoades' dog.
4	4	"Whose Room Is It Anyway"	Zane Buzby	Marcy Vosburgh & Sandy Sprung	April 26, 1987	1.06	N/A
Steve and Marcy plan on adding another room to their house with their tax refund, but the men and wives soon get into a huge argument when Al and Steve want a room in which to play pool, while Peg and Marcy want to put together a yoga exercise room.
5	5	"Have You Driven a Ford Lately?"	Linda Day	Richard Gurman & Katherine Green	May 3, 1987	1.05	N/A
Al and Steve purchase a vintage 1965 Ford Mustang. Since the car is in bad condition, Al and Steve decide to restore the car for themselves, but it completely takes up their free time, irking Peg and Marcy. Note: This episode's title is derived from the popular slogan "Have You Driven A Ford Lately?", which was used by the Ford Motor Company for 15 years between 1983 and 1998. The slogan was used at the time this episode aired.
6	6	"Sixteen Years and What Do You Get"	Linda Day	Katherine Green & Richard Gurman	May 10, 1987	1.03	N/A
Al is unable to purchase a gift for Peg on their 16th wedding anniversary, and later learns that his credit card was maxed out by both Peg and Kelly, who used it to buy gifts for Al and to pay for their catered dinner and entertainment, leaving Al unable to outgun them both.
7	7	"Married... without Children"	Linda Day	Story by : Matt Geller; Teleplay by : Ralph R. Farquhar	May 17, 1987	1.09	N/A
Al and Peg decide to go on vacation. They then ask Steve and Marcy to take care of Bud and Kelly while they're away, which Steve and Marcy reluctantly agree to. This massively backfires, however, as Bud and Kelly proceed to throw a huge party at the Rhoades' house, driving Steve and Marcy crazy. Meanwhile, Al and Peg have a better-than-expected time on their vacation and decide to stay longer than expected, while Steve and Marcy stare in horror at the street hoping for the Bundys to return as the party goes wild.
8	8	"The Poker Game"	Brian Levant	Ron Leavitt & Michael G. Moye	May 24, 1987	1.10	N/A
Al invites Steve to play poker with his best friends, but Steve ends up losing his entire paycheck to Al, leaving him in a hard situation with Marcy, who demands that Al give the money back, but Al insists he won it fair and square and refuses to return it. A desperate Marcy then enlists the help of Peg to stop him. Note: Christina Applegate and David Faustino do not appear in this episode.
9	9	"Peggy Sue Got Work"	Linda Day	Ellen L. Fogle	May 31, 1987	1.08	N/A
Peg takes a job as a clerk at a clock store in the mall when Al refuses to buy her a VCR, telling her to buy it with her own money. Both Peg and Al are unhappy with the situation, and each pay their kids to suggest that Peg should quit the job.
10	10	"Al Loses His Cherry"	Arlando Smith	Marcy Vosburgh & Sandy Sprung	June 7, 1987	1.07	N/A
Al runs away from home after a fight with Peg and stays with his best friend, Luke. When sisters Terry and Sherry Cherry show up (Jerry_Hall and Pamela Bowman respectively), Luke takes Terry to bed, while Sherry tries to seduce Al. Al has mixed feelings whether he should cheat on Peg, since he has spent 16 years with her, but is unhappy with his life. In the end, Al finally decides not to cheat on Peg and returns home. Note: This is the final appearance of Al's friend/coworker Luke Ventura.
11	11	"Nightmare on Al's Street"	Linda Day	Michael G. Moye	June 14, 1987	1.12	N/A
Marcy freaks out when she begins having erotic dreams about Al after the two have a heated argument about men versus women, and wonders whether or not she may actually be sexually attracted to Al. Haunted by her dreams, Marcy ultimately comes to her conclusion and confronts Al. Note: This is the first mention of Al's retirement property on Lake Chicamocomico.
12	12	"Where's the Boss"	Linda Day	Marcy Vosburgh & Sandy Sprung	June 21, 1987	1.11	N/A
When the owner of Al's shoe store is involved a near-fatal plane crash, Al decides that it is time to either get some recognition from his boss or quit his job. After gaining no recognition, Al quits his job and becomes even more miserable at home. In the end, Al returns to work at the shoe store, but not without a surprise.
13	13	"Johnny B. Gone"	Linda Day	Katherine Green & Richard Gurman	June 28, 1987	1.13	N/A
Al and Peggy are forced to delay going to the closing of their favorite burger joint, Johnny Be Good's, when Bud and Kelly need them to solve their own problems. Meanwhile, Steve and Marcy prepare a party for their bosses at home.

== Home release ==
On October 23, 2003, season one was released on DVD in the United States. The set contains all 13 episodes, as well as bonus features, including the 2003 Married... with Children television reunion special. It was released in Australia on DVD on October 25, 2005. It was re-released in the United States on January 21, 2014.
