= It's a Bundyful Life =

- Married... with Children episode
- Episode no.: Season 4 Episode 11; 12
- Directed by: Gerry Cohen
- Written by: Michael G. Moye; Ron Leavitt; Kevin Curran
- Original air date: December 17, 1989

Guest appearance
- Sam Kinison

Episode chronology
← Previous "At the Zoo"	Next → "Who'll Stop the Rain"
- Married... with Children season 4

"It's a Bundyful Life" is the two part Christmas episode consisting of the 11th and 12th episodes of the fourth season of the American television series Married... with Children.

When the two-part episode originally aired on December 17, 1989, following the world premiere of The Simpsons, both shows earned the Fox Broadcasting Company their Sunday highest ratings ever.

== Plot ==
Shoe salesman Al Bundy has saved up a lot of cash in a Christmas club savings account with his local bank so he can buy his family presents. After Al fails to get the presents when the bank closes too early to retrieve the money, he is accidentally electrocuted while trying to get his Christmas lights to work. When Al awakens he comes face to face with his guardian angel who takes him on an It's a Wonderful Life inspired journey of what his family would have been like if he had never been born.

== Critical reception ==
San Francisco Chronicle, "In this two-part episode, Al Bundy (Ed O'Neill) ruins the holiday, prompting his family to abandon him for a Denny's. Home alone, Al nearly dies trying to put up the Christmas lights, which in turn prompts a visit from his guardian angel. No, it's not the sweet Clarence you remember, but rather comedian Sam Kinison."

Collider, "The holiday episode is considered a favorite among fans because it's Ted McGinley's first appearance on the show before he went on to play Jefferson D'Arcy. The Christmas element keeps the novelty of the episode intact and Fox re-aired "It's a Bundyful Life" six years after the series' cancelation which is an extremely rare situation for a parent network of a canceled sitcom."

Yahoo, "Casting the late, great comedian Sam Kinison as Al's foul-mouthed guardian angel was a stroke of divine inspiration. And you have to respect "Bundyful Life" for not wimping out and going soft in the final act; Al tells Sam he wants to live again… just because his family seemed too happy without him around. A perfectly Scrooge-like sentiment that flies in the face of every corny Christmas episode we've ever had to endure… does it get any more Bundyful than that?"

Collider, "The irreverent Fox comedy Married... With Children proudly skewered all aspects of a normal, American sitcom family, and this two-part Christmas special is the perfect antithesis to the usual holiday fare."
