= Married for Life =

1996 British TV sitcom

- Genre: Sitcom
- Written by: Katherine Green; Richard Gurman; Jan Rosenbloom; Sandy Sprung; Marcy Vosburgh
- Directed by: Terry Kinane
- Starring: Russ Abbot; Susan Kyd; Lucy Blakely; Peter England; Hugh Bonneville; Julie Dawn Cole
- Composer: Debbie Wiseman
- Country of origin: United Kingdom
- Original language: English
- No. of series: 1
- No. of episodes: 7

Production
- Production location: The Television House
- Running time: 30 min
- Production companies: Central Independent Television; Columbia TriStar Central Productions

Original release
- Network: ITV
- Release: 5 March – 16 April 1996

Related
- Married... with Children

Married for Life is a British seven-episode sitcom with one series. It was produced by Central Television and Columbia TriStar Central Productions and is a remake of the American sitcom Married... with Children.

== Cast ==
The Bundys were renamed as the Butlers: Russ Abbot played Ted/Al, Susan Kyd was Pam/Peggy, Lucy Blakely played Nikki/Kelly, and Peter England was Lee/Bud. The Rhoadeses were renamed Hollingsworth: the Steve character was recast with Hugh Bonneville and Marcy was renamed Judy and played by Julie Dawn Cole. The series featured an early performance from Rob Brydon.

== Episode list ==
No.	Title	Directed by	Written by	Original release date
1	"For Whom the Bell Tolls"	Terry Kinane	Katherine Green and Richard Gurman	5 March 1996
When Ted receives a high phone bill, Pam and the kids swear they didn't do it. Ted complains to the phone company and they promptly turn off his phone, which spells disaster. Remake of Married... with Children episode Nº 20.
2	"If I Were a Rich Man"	Terry Kinane	Sandy Sprung and Marcy Vosburgh	12 March 1996
When the bank loses a large amount of money, everyone blames Ted. He denies his guilt but points out that if he did have the money, he wouldn't share with those who had been mean to him. Soon everyone is treating Ted like a king. Remake of Married... with Children episode Nº 16.
3	"Sixteen Years and What Do You Get?"	Terry Kinane	Katherine Green and Richard Gurman	19 March 1996
Pam and Ted plan a big celebration for their 16th anniversary. Although they say no gifts, Ted plans to buy Pam a watch. When the kids tell Pam this, she buys him an expensive gift. Unfortunately, when Ted goes to the jewellery store his credit card is denied. Remake of Married... with Children episode Nº 6.
4	"Where's the Boss?"	Terry Kinane	Sandy Sprung and Marcy Vosburgh	26 March 1996
When Ted hears his boss has been killed in a plane crash, he's upset that he's never met the man. When he finds out that his boss survived, he decides to quit his job if the man won't come meet his employees. The boss doesn't appear, so Ted stays home with Pam and watches daytime TV. Remake of Married... with Children episode Nº 12.
5	"Whose Room Is It Anyway?"	Terry Kinane	Sandy Sprung and Marcy Vosburgh	2 April 1996
While Ted scolds his family for their endless, useless spending, the Hollingsworths receive a tax refund and decide to build an extra room onto their house. Unfortunately, they need Ted's OK to continue the project. Remake of Married... with Children episode Nº 4.
6	"My Mum, the Mum"	Terry Kinane	Jan Rosenbloom	9 April 1996
When Lee loses his new jacket, Ted decides to teach him the value of money by making him work at the shoe store. Elsewhere, Nikki volunteers Pam to cook for Career Day at her school, and Pam gives the class advice on being a stay-at-home mum. Remake of Married... with Children episode Nº 47.
7	"Eatin' Out"	Terry Kinane	Sandy Sprung and Marcy Vosburgh	16 April 1996
After receiving a small inheritance, the family decides to spend the money on a fancy meal. Unfortunately, after eating, Ted realizes he left his wallet at home. Remake of Married... with Children episode Nº 46.
