= Married... with Children season 3 =

1988–89 season of American TV series

Married... with Children
- Season 3
- DVD cover
- Showrunners: Ron Leavitt; Michael G. Moye
- Starring: Ed O'Neill; Katey Sagal; David Garrison; Amanda Bearse; Christina Applegate; David Faustino
- No. of episodes: 22

Release
- Original network: Fox (episodes 1–9; 11–22); FX (episode 10)
- Original release: November 6, 1988 – May 21, 1989

Season chronology
- ← Previous; Season 2 Next → Season 4

This is a list of episodes for the third season (1988–89) of the television series Married... with Children. The season aired on Fox from November 6, 1988, to May 21, 1989.

The third season marked an increase in the show's popularity, based on Terry Rakolta's moral campaign against the show, which began after the episode "Her Cups Runneth Over", in which Al and Steve go to a lingerie store in search of Peggy's favorite bra, which had been discontinued. Michael Faustino, David Faustino's brother, makes his second guest appearance in the episode "Life's a Beach". During the season, the show became the first on Fox to achieve a quarter share of viewership.

The episode "I'll See You in Court" was withdrawn from airing at the time. In the episode, Al and Peggy Bundy unintentionally have a sex tape filmed of themselves at a motel and attempt to sue the motel owner. Fox chose not to air the episode surrounding other controversies related to the show, and "I'll See You in Court" did not air until 2002 when FX acquired the rights to reruns of Married... with Children. It was aired for the first time as a "lost episode" on June 18, 2002.

== Episodes ==
No. overall	No. in season	Title	Directed by	Written by	Original release date	Prod. code	U.S. viewers (millions)	Rating/share (households)
36	1	"He Thought He Could"	Gerry Cohen	Ron Leavitt & Michael G. Moye	November 6, 1988	302	N/A	9.4/13
While moving old boxes from the attic, Al comes across a copy of The Little Engine That Could, which hasn't been returned to the local library (headed by an evil, redheaded woman named Miss DeGroot (Lu Leonard)) since 1957. This leads Al to take the book to the library and finally confront his old foe.
37	2	"I'm Going to Sweatland"	Gerry Cohen	Story by : Carl Studebaker; Teleplay by : Pamela Wick	November 20, 1988	303	N/A	10.0/14
Peggy becomes obsessed with Elvis Presley when she sees a man who looks like the King at the mall, and sees his image in a sweat stain on one of Al's shirts. This leads Bud and Kelly to turn their home into an Elvis-themed tourist attraction and start charging the neighborhood a fee to visit.
38	3	"Poke High"	Gerry Cohen	Ralph R. Farquhar	November 27, 1988	304	N/A	10.5/15
Al desperately tries to keep Matt, a local high school football playing, from breaking his tecord of scoring four touchdown in one game. Meanwhile, Kelly, who is in love with Matt, joins the cheeleading squad and tries to get a date with him during a game.
39	4	"The Camping Show" "A Period Piece"	Gerry Cohen	Sandy Sprung & Marcy Vosburgh	December 11, 1988	301	12.7	8.2/12
A guys-only fishing trip with Al, Bud and Steve turns sour when Steve invites Marcy, who then invites Peg and Kelly on the trip. Things then get worse when all three of the women have their periods simultaneously.
40	5	"A Dump of My Own"	Gerry Cohen	Michael G. Moye & Ron Leavitt	January 8, 1989	305	17.6	10.3/14
Al finally realizes his dream to build his own private bathroom inside the garage.
41	6	"Her Cups Runneth Over"	Gerry Cohen	Marcy Vosburgh & Sandy Sprung	January 15, 1989	306	18.7	10.3/15
Peg becomes depressed on her birthday when her favorite bra is discontinued. However, Al and Steve discover that Peggy's favorite bra is still being sold at a lingerie store called Francine's of Wisconsin, and set out to purchase it. Note: This episode started Terry Rakolta's moral boycott campaign against Married... with Children.
42	7	"The Bald and the Beautiful"	John Sgueglia	Jules Dennis & Richard Mueller	January 29, 1989	307	17.8	10.4/15
Steve thinks he's going bald after finding a newspaper clipping for an anti-baldness cure given to him by Marcy.
43	8	"The Gypsy Cried"	Gerry Cohen	Richard Gurman	February 5, 1989	309	18.5	10.9/15
Steve and Marcy decide to hire a psychic, who predicts good fortune for Al, Peg, and Steve — and doom for Marcy. Guest cast: Carmen Zapata as Madame Olga, F. William Parker as Mr. Vandergelder, Barbara Alyn Woods as Vicky, Steve Bean as Fred, and Sandra Wild as Fluffy
44	9	"Requiem for a Dead Barber"	James E. Hornbeck	Ron Leavitt & Michael G. Moye	February 12, 1989	310	21.6	12.0/18
Al's favorite barber dies, and he refuses to go anywhere else for a haircut. Eventually, however, Al is persuaded to go to a salon and risk losing his masculinity. Guest cast: Kenny Sacha as Mr. Adonis, Charlie Spradling as Murphy, Steven Levy as Mr. Ron, Stacey Alden as Fran, Harry Hart-Browne as Eduardo, Steve Susskind as Barney, Frank Lloyd as Norris, Vito D'Ambrosio as Louie, Garrett Morris as Russ, and Jennifer Diane Hanson as Salon Receptionist
45	10	"I'll See You in Court"	Gerry Cohen	Jeanne Baruch & Jeanne Romano	Unaired; June 18, 2002 (on FX)	308	N/A	N/A
To spark up their waning marriage, Al and Peg go to a seedy motel, where one of the porn movies they watch is surveillance footage of Steve and Marcy having sex. Eventually, the situation gets dragged to court, where Al and Peg finally decide to get intimate.
46	11	"Eatin' Out"	Gerry Cohen	Sandy Sprung & Marcy Vosburgh	February 19, 1989	311	19.9	11.5/17
After receiving a moderately large windfall, the Bundys go out to eat at a fancy restaurant — where trouble arises when Al forgets to bring the money with him.
47	12	"My Mom, the Mom"	Gerry Cohen	Story by : Jan Rosenbloom; Teleplay by : Lesa Kite & Cindy Begel	February 26, 1989	312	21.1	12.5/18
Peg resorts to acting like a true mom when Kelly picks her to appear at Polk High's Parents Day. Meanwhile, Al teaches Bud the value of a dollar by putting him to work at the shoe store.
48	13	"Can't Dance, Don't Ask Me"	Gerry Cohen	Story by : Gabrielle Topping; Teleplay by : Robert Ulin	March 5, 1989	313	19.7	11.4/17
After getting Polk High's dance club in trouble during a field trip, Kelly is forced to join and perform a tap routine at the school talent show as punishment. Meanwhile, Al thinks a conspiracy exists among the women when his socks end up missing.
49	14	"A Three Job, No Income Family"	Gerry Cohen	Richard Gurman	March 19, 1989	314	17.4	10.9/16
When money becomes tighter than usual at the Bundy house, Peg signs Al up for a job as a make-up salesman, but when Peg hears the job's perks, she herself signs up for the job instead, and (seemingly) proves to be a better seller than Al. Pauly Shore guest-stars as Al's manager.
50	15	"The Harder They Fall"	Gerry Cohen	Ellen L. Fogle	March 26, 1989	315	16.2	10.4/17
While driving with Steve to the video store, Peg flips off a driver and gets Steve in trouble, prompting the Bundys to stay at the Rhoades' house to protect him — and take advantage of their neighbors' hospitality.
51	16	"The House That Peg Lost"	Gerry Cohen	Steve Granat & Mel Sherer	April 9, 1989	316	19.3	12.0/18
While the Rhoades’ are away on vacation, the Bundys are called to house-sit for them, leading to the Rhoades' house being taken away by a man looking for a roadhouse. Meanwhile, Kelly has a slumber party with her best friends, which leads to chaos when Bud reveals that Kelly slept with each of her best friends' boyfriends.
52	17	"Married... with Prom Queen (Part I)"	Gerry Cohen	Ellen L. Fogle	April 23, 1989	317	17.5	10.6/17
Part one of two: Peggy's chances at being prom queen at her high school reunion are doomed when her old rival, Connie Bender ("Bring a friend, it won't offend her"), arrives. Meanwhile, Al meets his old rival in high school, Jack, and decides to continue the fight they last had following graduation.
53	18	"Married... with Prom Queen: The Sequel (Part II)"	Gerry Cohen	Ellen L. Fogle	April 30, 1989	318	17.7	11.2/18
Conclusion: Peggy recruits Bud and Kelly's help in rigging the prom queen election so Peg can win. Meanwhile, Al squares off with high-school rival Jack in a parking lot fight.
54	19	"The Dateless Amigo"	Gerry Cohen	Sara V. Finney & Vida Spears	May 7, 1989	320	17.8	10.2/16
Al comes up with a new invention called "Shoe Lights" and uses Kelly as his guinea pig. Meanwhile, Bud, trying to prove to his friends that he can get a girl, uses a department-store mannequin as his date.
55	20	"The Computer Show"	Gerry Cohen	Ralph R. Farquhar	May 14, 1989	319	14.1	8.5/14
Against Al's wishes, Peg and Marcy buy a home computer for the Bundy house, which drives Al to near insanity.
56	21	"Life's a Beach"	Gerry Cohen	Ralph R. Farquhar	May 21, 1989	321	17.5	10.6/17
The Bundys (along with Steve and Marcy) spend a day at the beach. Michael Faustino guest-stars.
57	22	"Here's Lookin' at You, Kid"	Gerry Cohen	Story by : Len O'Neill; Teleplay by : Jeanne Baruch & Jeanne Romano	August 27, 1989	322	17.5	10.6/17
The neighborhood women become the targets of a peeping Tom — except for Peg, who takes it as a sign that she is not attractive anymore. Meanwhile, Al convinces Bud to help Kelly with her studies.
