= Al Bundy =

Fictional character from Married... with Children

- Married... with Children character
- Ed O'Neill as Al Bundy
- First appearance: "Pilot"
- Last appearance: "How to Marry a Moron"
- Created by: Michael G. Moye; Ron Leavitt
- Portrayed by: Ed O'Neill

In-universe information
- Gender: Male
- Occupation: Women's shoe salesman
- Family: Father (deceased); Mother (died during series); Eugene Bundy (brother)
- Spouses: Peggy Bundy (née Wanker, married in 1971)
- Children: Kelly Bundy (daughter); Bud Bundy (son)
- Relatives: Jebediah Bundy (grandfather); Joe Bundy (uncle); Stymie Bundy (uncle); Addie Bundy (aunt); Heather Bundy (aunt); Stymie Bundy II (nephew); Sheila Bundy (cousin); Iggy Bundy (cousin); Lester Bundy (cousin); Seamus McBundy (ancestor; deceased)

Alphonse "Al" Bundy is a fictional character and the protagonist of the American television series Married... with Children, played by Ed O'Neill. He is a misanthropic, working-class father of two who is portrayed as a tragicomedic figure. He laments his lot in life, but nevertheless stands by his family, displaying wit, self-sacrifice, and resilience in times of crisis.

He and his wife Peggy were rated the 59th best characters on television by Bravo. In a 2016 interview, O'Neill said that he based his interpretation of Al Bundy on one of his uncles.

== Character background ==
Alphonse "Al" Bundy was born on November 7, 1948, in Chicago, Illinois. Al's mother may have been an alcoholic: as shown in flashback sequences, he recalls a moment when his mother tells him that he can become anything and then, in real-time, remarks "Yeah right, Mom, try saying that when you're sober!". He was a star fullback on the Polk High School Football team and was offered a scholarship to play college football. However, a broken leg and his subsequent marriage to high-school sweetheart Peggy Wanker while intoxicated changed his fortunes.

Al and Peggy live in Chicago and have two children: Kelly (Christina Applegate), a promiscuous, dim-witted blonde, and Bud (David Faustino), an intelligent but sex-obsessed and unpopular schemer named after Budweiser beer. Al works as a shoe salesman at the fictional Gary's Shoes and Accessories for Today's Woman in the fictional New Market Mall. He loses or quits the job several times throughout the series, yet always ends up re-hired.

Al has a sarcastic and cynical sense of humor, and he frequently makes sardonic observations. He is also often criticized by Peggy for his poor hygiene. Allegedly, Al showers and brushes his teeth as rarely as he has sex, which is extremely infrequent, as he continually avoids Peggy's advances.

== Relationships with others ==
Despite his criticism of and seeming antipathy for his family he does sometimes display great affection for them. Examples can be seen on the rare occasions when he obtains money enabling him to enjoy luxuries. In one episode, Peggy and Al receive free first class plane tickets to New York City and they are shown sipping champagne together and singing "I Got You, Babe". In another episode, Al's car goes missing and the only reason he wants it back is to recover a mysterious item in the trunk, which turns out to be a family photo of Al, Peggy, Kelly, and Bud together, suggesting his distaste for them is spawned merely by his dissatisfaction with his extremely poor quality of life. Al is protective of Kelly, who he refers to by the term of endearment "Pumpkin.” He regularly insults and often physically assaults her dates (who are usually trying to take advantage of her) and throws them bodily from the house, so much so that he once threw Bud out while the lights were off, mistaking him for one of Kelly's dates.

Al is detested by most of his neighbors, except for Steve Rhoades and Jefferson D'Arcy; both are, at different times, married to Marcy who is Al's arch-nemesis. In "Route 666", Marcy said that, when the neighborhood thought Al had died, they all started dancing and singing "Ding dong, the shoe man's dead" and called it a "cruel, cruel hoax" when they learned that Al had survived his latest misadventure. In another example of the neighborhood's distaste of Al during "You Better Shop Around", after he caused a city-wide blackout during a heatwave, the neighbors show up at his house with pitchforks and torches. Other people barely acknowledge that he exists and, as a result, his name often ends up misspelled on paychecks, reserved parking spots, etc. (e.g., "Bumby", "Boondy" or "Birdy").

Politically, Al appears to have mixed views; various episodes depict him mocking Rush Limbaugh, whereas others show him as a committed fan of conservative icon John Wayne. He is an ardent admirer of President Dwight D. Eisenhower. He continually battles with Marcy, a staunch feminist, and even forms a misogynist group named "No Ma'am". His views on economic issues display a populist disdain for the wealthy, including leading a violent protest against a proposed law that would tax beer, but not wine.

Al cannot stop himself from uttering insulting one-liners to obese women, a behavior he has compulsively engaged in since he was a child.

== Income ==
Throughout the series, Al is continually saddled with massive debts caused by everything from the various failed schemes he becomes involved in to his wife's extravagant spending habits. However, he never appears to miss a mortgage payment or file for bankruptcy. According to family lore, the "Bundy Will" (a document perpetuating these debts rather than bestowing an inheritance) is passed down from generation to generation as a punishment after Al's ancestor, Seamus McBundy, insulted an obese witch who then cursed the family. Peggy often jokes that Al makes minimum wage and his poor financial outlook is frequently mocked and employed as comedy. In one episode, Al is offered early retirement and given a year's pay: $12,000, yet in another episode he says that after taxes and Peggy's profligate spending he only gets one nickel out of every paycheck. In "My Mom, The Mom", Al states he earns a 10% commission on each sale. In "Weenie Tot Lovers and Other Strangers", Peg states his paycheck was for "80 pesos". The family also obtained money by appearing on game-shows, engaging in theft, participating in various absurd schemes, and mooching off of the Rhoades/D'Arcy's wealth.

== "The Dodge" ==
Al owns a 1970s Dodge automobile. The car is only ever referred to as "The Dodge", but the model occasionally shown is (alternately) a harvest gold or blue Plymouth Duster. Bud once described Al's Dodge as being assembled from various parts of many different wrecked and derelict Dodges. It is depicted as hopelessly unreliable and Al is often shown pushing the broken-down car into the garage. In one episode, Al is offered a brand-new Dodge Viper, as his old car is about to turn one million miles and the car company wants to film the event. His actions cause the car to turn the millionth mile before Dodge can film it and they refuse to honor the deal.

== Running gags ==
Most of the show's running gags concern Al. The constantly unlucky Al maintains a "do-it-yourself" attitude whenever something in the house needs repair. When he combines his creativity with his poor judgment and lack of skill, the results are usually absurd and result in property damage and/or physical injury to Al. He has survived incredible injuries resulting from repeatedly falling off his roof while installing a satellite dish and getting shocked by the same dish, to being crushed by a massive woman wrestler (Big Bad Mama from Gorgeous Ladies of Wrestling), to jumping from an airplane without a parachute. He even survived a huge explosion when he dynamited his own yard trying to kill a rabbit who was eating his vegetable garden. (The rabbit survives unscathed.)

He is often seen leaving restrooms, even public ones, with a newspaper tucked under his arm, to the sound of a toilet flushing.

Al loves bowling, and "nudie" bars and regularly comments on both. His favorite magazine is the pornographic Big'uns. He enjoys watching sports on television with his right hand tucked into his waistband (he switches to his left hand on Sundays), and his favorite sitcom is the fictional Psycho Dad, which he always mentions.

Al's greatest life achievement was scoring four touchdowns in a single game while playing in the 1966 city football championship game versus fictional Andrew Johnson High School, and he constantly makes reference to it in comparison to the way his life has turned out instead. The episode, "Damn Bundys", featured Al selling his soul to the devil (Robert Englund) in order to lead the Chicago Bears to the Super Bowl as the oldest rookie in NFL history; Al scores the touchdown and ends up in hell with his family and neighbors for 300 years. In the Season 10 episode "Dud Bowl II", a scoreboard at Polk High's football stadium was to be dedicated to Al, but Marcy arranged for it to instead be named after Terry Bradshaw out of malice; after Kelly convinces Bradshaw to let the scoreboard to be named after Al, Al (unaware of this) arranges for Jefferson and Bud to destroy the scoreboard.

Al does have some talents, which are frequently referenced. He is an extremely gifted bowler and he always appears to win fistfights.

== Reception ==
Al Bundy had a highly positive reception. Much of the praise went to O'Neill's portrayal of the character. Al and Peg were named the 59th best TV characters by Bravo.

In 2009, Time magazine named him among the 10 most memorable fathers in television history. In 2014, BuzzFeed listed Al Bundy as the 10th greatest TV dad of all time.
