= Look Who's Barking =

Look Who's Barking may refer to:

- "Look Who's Barking", an episide of TV series Charmed season 3
- "Look Who's Barking", an episide of TV series Married... with Children season 5
