= It's Your Move =

American sitcom (1984–1985)

- Genre: Sitcom
- Created by: Ron Leavitt; Michael G. Moye
- Written by: Al Aidekman; Fred Fox, Jr. Ron Leavitt; Michael G. Moye; Pamela Norris; Sandy Sprung; Marcy Vosburgh
- Directed by: Peter Bonerz; Jim Drake; John Pasquin; Tony Singletary; Arlando Smith
- Starring: Jason Bateman; Caren Kaye; Tricia Cast; Ernie Sabella; David Garrison; Adam Sadowsky
- Theme music composer: Rik Howard; Bob Wirth
- Country of origin: United States
- Original language: English
- No. of seasons: 1
- No. of episodes: 18

Production
- Executive producers: Ron Leavitt; Michael G. Moye
- Producers: Al Aidekman; John Maxwell Anderson; Katherine Green; Fred Fox, Jr.
- Camera setup: Multi-camera
- Running time: 22–24 minutes
- Production company: Embassy Television

Original release
- Network: NBC
- Release: September 26, 1984 – February 23, 1985

It's Your Move is an American sitcom television series created by Ron Leavitt and Michael G. Moye, starring Jason Bateman, Tricia Cast, Caren Kaye, Ernie Sabella, David Garrison, Adam Sadowsky, and Garrett Morris. The show originally aired on NBC from September 26, 1984, to February 23, 1985, running for 18 episodes. The series starred Bateman as Matthew Burton, a teenage con artist whose schemes are upended when a writer named Norman Lamb (Garrison) moves in across the hall and begins dating his widowed mother. Leavitt and Moye went on to co-create Married... with Children for Fox, bringing Garrison along to that series.

== Premise ==
The show centered on Matthew Burton (Bateman), a teenage scam artist who lived in a Van Nuys, California, apartment with his older sister Julie (Cast) and widowed mother Eileen (Kaye). Matt ran various underhanded dealings with his high school friends, especially his sidekick Eli (Sadowsky), such as selling pre-written term papers and exam answer keys, and even engaging in blackmail. His mother was oblivious to all his cons, grifts and scams; his older sister was aware, but couldn't prove anything.

The status quo of Matthew's world changed in the series' pilot, when Norman Lamb (Garrison) moved into the apartment across the hall. A quick-witted but impoverished writer from Chicago, Norman struck up a friendship with Eileen and the two were soon dating. Dismayed that his mother had chosen someone he felt was beneath her, Matt attempted to sabotage their relationship, but soon found Norman to be a cagey antagonist who regularly (though not always) foiled Matthew's plots—it turned out Norman had once been a teen con artist himself, and knew most of Matthew's tricks. Norman, meanwhile, also became one of Matthew's high school teachers. Not wanting to hurt Eileen, Norman kept Eileen in the dark about Matthew's true nature, as long as he could render Matthew's schemes harmless.

Also seen was Ernie Sabella as Lou Donatelli, the manager of the apartment building where the Burtons and Norman lived. Matthew sometimes used empty apartments in the building for some of his operations, but the none-too-bright Mr. Donatelli was usually several steps away from figuring out what was going on. Garrett Morris had a recurring role as Principal Dwight Ellis, who was both Norman's boss and Matthew's high school principal.

The battle-of-wits premise of the show was changed significantly after episode 14 ("Caught in the Act"), in which Matthew was caught by his mother red-handed in the midst of one of his schemes. Matthew wound up confessing not only to his current escapade, but to virtually everything else he'd ever done. Eileen also discovered that Norman had been covering up for Matthew. After a lot of recriminations, Norman apologized for keeping the truth from Eileen, and the two made up. Matthew sincerely apologized and completely abandoned his scamming, as well as deciding to support Norman and Eileen's relationship. The show consequently became a much more traditional family-oriented sitcom for its last few episodes, in which Matthew's much-tamer 'scheming' was in support of the (generally wholesome) goals of family or classmates.

This almost complete change in Matthew's character may have been a result of letters that NBC received from parents of high school-aged boys. According to Jason Bateman, the reason the show was cancelled was because NBC was receiving “letters from mothers across the country whose kids were getting into trouble at school by mimicking Matthew’s (Bateman) antics”.

== Cast ==
- Jason Bateman as Matthew Burton
- Caren Kaye as Eileen Burton
- Tricia Cast as Julie Burton
- Ernie Sabella as Lou Donatelli
- David Garrison as Norman Lamb
- Adam Sadowsky as Eli

=== "The Dregs of Humanity" episode ===
A notable episode was a two-parter entitled "The Dregs of Humanity". In the first half of the episode, Eli loses the school's money that had been trusted to Matt for hiring a band for a school dance. To cover the loss, Matthew crafts the rise and fall of a band (The Dregs of Humanity) and acts as their manager. The fictitious band, which actually consisted of four skeletons stolen from the biology lab (and controlled by strings with a smoke machine to cover them up), is a little too successful and Matthew soon finds himself agreeing to allow Norman an interview with the band for Music Press magazine, figuring that if the truth ever comes out, Norman will be humiliated. The interview only fuels the Dregs' popularity, and this sets up the cliffhanger: the Palladium calls and offers a $20,000 gig for the Dregs. While heretofore willing to let the Dregs retire, the money is too enticing and Matt agrees to the gig.

The second installment of the two-part episode was scheduled to air the following week, but was preempted by a speech by then-President Reagan.

In the second part of the episode, Matthew is scrambling to explain why The Dregs failed to show up to a sold-out concert. To make matters worse, Norman is starting to suspect that the band doesn't exist and Matthew gets sued. He finally has the brilliant idea to send the "band" to a watery grave by concocting a story that the "band" drove off a cliff into the ocean. In a later episode, it is revealed that the fake band was inducted into the Rock and Roll Hall of Fame.

=== Critical reaction and cancellation ===
The series opened with some positive reception from critics, but its time slot competed with the popular show Dynasty on ABC and the series was canceled in early 1985.

== Production notes ==
The show's creators and executive producers were Michael G. Moye and Ron Leavitt, who just three years later would take the harder tone of the It's Your Move concept and put it in an entirely different context: Fox's Married... with Children, in which Garrison starred for four seasons (the two shows also shared the same production company, Embassy Communications).

== Guest stars ==
- Kristy Swanson ("Love Letters")
- River Phoenix ("Pilot")
- Justine Bateman ("Pajama Party")
- Alan Blumenfeld ("Dad and Me")
- Shawnee Smith (“The Experts”)
- Liz Sheridan (“A Woman is Just a Woman”)
- Nina Blackwood (“The Dregs of Humanity: Part 2”)

== Episodes ==
No.	Title	Directed by	Written by	Original release date
1	"Pilot"	Peter Bonerz	Ron Leavitt & Michael G. Moye	September 26, 1984
Teen Matt tries to foil romance between his mother and a neighbor. Guest star: River Phoenix
2	"Put to the Test"	Linda Day	Al Aidekman	October 3, 1984
Substitute teacher Norman foils Matt's plans to cheat on a test.
3	"Dating Games"	Arlando Smith	Ron Leavitt & Michael G. Moye	October 17, 1984
Matt tries to convince Julie to go out with Eli.
4	"Night Work"	Jim Drake	Ron Leavitt & Michael G. Moye	October 24, 1984
To impress a girl, Matt hires a limousine and borrows Norman's apartment.
5	"Pajama Party"	John Pasquin	Fred Fox, Jr.	October 31, 1984
Matt plans to bug Julie's pajama party and sell the secrets. Guest star: Justine Bateman
6	"Love Letters"	John Tracy	Sandy Sprung & Marcy Vosburgh	November 14, 1984
Matt and Norman receive notes from a secret admirer. Guest star: Kristy Swanson
7	"Dad and Me"	Bob Lally	Fred Fox, Jr. & Al Aidekman	November 21, 1984
Norman and Matt pose as father and son on a TV game show. Guest star: Alan Blumenfeld
8	"The Rival"	Jim Drake	Ron Leavitt & Michael G. Moye	November 28, 1984
To irk Norman, Matt hires a man to romance Eileen.
9	"Top Dog"	Tony Singletary	Pamela Norris	December 5, 1984
Norman takes over Matt's English class.
10	"Don't Leave Home Without It"	John Pasquin	Katherine Green	December 12, 1984
Matt sabotages Norman and Eileen's getaway by canceling Norman's credit card.
11	"The Christmas Show"	Arlando Smith	Sandy Sprung & Marcy Vosburgh	December 19, 1984
Norman tries to show the Burtons the meaning of Christmas.
12	"The Dregs of Humanity: Part 1"	Jim Drake	Ron Leavitt & Michael G. Moye	January 2, 1985
After Eli loses school-dance funds, Matt promotes a group of skeletons.
13	"The Dregs of Humanity: Part 2"	Jim Drake	Ron Leavitt & Michael G. Moye	January 9, 1985
Norman helps dispose of the Dregs of Humanity. Guest star: Nina Blackwood; Pre-empted in most of the country due to a speech by Ronald Reagan, and seen only on the west coast. Part two was rerun over the summer of 1985 in primetime.
14	"Caught in the Act"	Tony Singletary	Sandy Sprung & Marcy Vosburgh	January 26, 1985
Matt's latest scheme revolves around efforts to convince his mother's boss to give her a raise. Note: With this episode, the show moves to Saturdays, replaced on Wednesdays by Sara. Also with this episode the central premise changes and a modified title sequence makes its debut.
15	"Eli's Song"	Tony Singletary	Pamela Norris	February 2, 1985
Matt convinces Norman to let Eli play on the school soccer team.
16	"A Woman Is Just a Woman"	Tony Singletary	Fred Fox, Jr. & Al Aidekman	February 9, 1985
Eileen's rejected suitor takes his new bride on a lavish holiday. Guest star: Liz Sheridan
17	"The Experts"	Thomas McConnell	Michael G. Moye	February 16, 1985
Principal Ellis and Norman ask Matt for investment advice. Guest star: Shawnee Smith
18	"Goodbye, Farewell, and Amen"	Herbert Kenwith	Pamela Norris	February 23, 1985
A cheerleader plots to get Julie kicked off the squad. The title of this episode is the same as the last episode of M*A*S*H, suggesting that the writers and production staff knew this was to be the series finale.

== Award nominations ==
Year	Association	Category	Recipient	Result	Ref.
1985	Young Artist Awards	Best Young Actor in a Television Comedy Series	Jason Bateman	Nominated	
1985	Young Artist Awards	Best New Comedy or Drama Television Series	–	Nominated	
1986	Young Artist Awards	Best Young Actress Starring in a Television Series	Tricia Cast	Nominated	

== Syndication ==
The show was rerun on the USA Network from 1989 to 1992.
