= Adam Sadowsky =

American entrepreneur and actor (1970–2021)

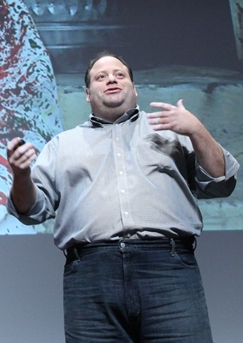
- Adam Sadowsky presenting at the 2011 Cusp Conference in Chicago, Illinois
- Born: October 28, 1970; United States
- Died: August 11, 2021 (aged 50); United States
- Occupations: Entrepreneur, actor
- Known for: It's Your Move

Adam Sadowsky (October 28, 1970 – August 11, 2021) was an American entrepreneur and actor.

He was the president of Syyn Labs, the company responsible for building the Rube Goldberg machine featured in the music video for the OK Go song "This Too Shall Pass".

As a teenager, Adam acted professionally on the NBC sitcom It's Your Move alongside Jason Bateman, in FOX's Second Chance with Matthew Perry, and had a small role in Three O'Clock High.

Sadowsky was featured as a guest judge on the show Unchained Reaction.

Sadowsky died on August 11, 2021, at the age of 50.
