= Working It Out =

- Genre: Sitcom
- Created by: Bill Persky
- Written by: Joan Casadamont; Anne Flett-Giordano; Peter Gethers; David Handler; Lee Kalecheim; Mitchell Karp; Bill Persky; Chuck Ranberg; Nina Shengold; Jeffrey Sweet; Adriana Trigiani
- Directed by: Bill Persky
- Starring: Jane Curtin; Stephen Collins
- Opening theme: "Workin' It Out"
- Composers: John Loeffler; Ralph Schuckett
- Country of origin: United States
- Original language: English
- No. of seasons: 1
- No. of episodes: 13 (2 unaired)

Production
- Executive producer: Bill Persky
- Producers: George Barimo; Steven Haft
- Editor: Barry Waldman
- Camera setup: Multi-camera
- Running time: 22–24 minutes
- Production companies: DanJali Productions; 20th Television

Original release
- Network: NBC
- Release: August 22 – December 26, 1990

Working It Out is an American sitcom television series starring Jane Curtin and Stephen Collins that aired on NBC from August 22 to December 26, 1990. The series was created and executive produced by Bill Persky.

== Synopsis ==
Working It Out is the story of two single parents, Sarah Marshall (Jane Curtin) and David Stuart (Stephen Collins), who had never seriously contemplated remarriage until they met each other. Given their past histories, both had considerable trepidation, and this was reinforced by their friends' attitudes.

Working It Out did not fare well in the Nielsen ratings and was cancelled in December 1990.

== Cast ==
- Jane Curtin as Sarah Marshall
- Stephen Collins as David Stuart
- David Garrison as Stan
- Mary Beth Hurt as Andy
- Kyndra Joy Casper as Molly Marshall
- Chevi Colton as Sophie

== Episodes ==
No.	Title	Directed by	Written by	Original release date
1	"Pilot"	Bill Persky	Bill Persky	August 22, 1990
2	"And Now, My Non-Love"	Unknown	Unknown	September 22, 1990
3	"Who Asks First"	Unknown	Unknown	September 29, 1990
4	"First Date from Hell"	Unknown	Unknown	October 6, 1990
5	"What Next, My Love?"	Unknown	Unknown	October 13, 1990
6	"Old Boyfriends"	Unknown	Unknown	October 20, 1990
7	"Ageless Love"	Unknown	Unknown	October 27, 1990
8	"It Almost Happened One Night"	Unknown	Unknown	November 3, 1990
9	"Instructions"	Unknown	Unknown	November 10, 1990
10	"Take My Girlfriend..."	Unknown	Unknown	November 28, 1990
11	"Molly and David"	Unknown	Unknown	December 12, 1990
12	"Surprise! I Hate Your Friend!"	TBD	TBD	Unaired
13	"Foxhole"	TBD	TBD	Unaired
