= Tell Me More (musical) =

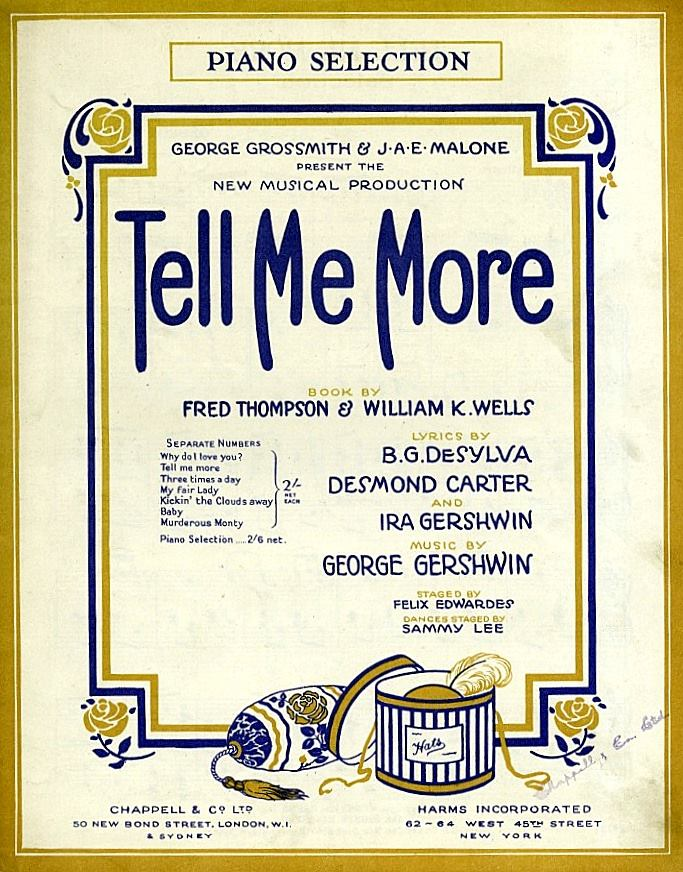
Cover of the sheet music of Gershwin musical Tell Me More (1925)

Tell Me More is a musical written by Fred Thompson and William K. Wells, with music by George Gershwin and lyrics by B. G. DeSylva and Ira Gershwin. It opened on Broadway at the Gaiety Theatre in April 1925 and in London in the same year at the Winter Garden Theatre. Directed by Clifford Whitley from The Co-Optimists and starring Elsa Macfarlane, also from The Co-Optimists.

== Productions ==
After the Broadway run, the show toured the US, including Chicago at the Selwyn Theatre in September 1925. It then starred Lou Holtz, Emma Haig and Mabel Withee.

== Synopsis ==
A rich young New Yorker, Kenneth, falls in love with a millinery sales clerk named Peggy. She does not know that her half-brother, Billy, is Kenneth's best friend. Peggy and Billy are estranged over disagreements that arose after their father died. Billy is also dating Bonnie, Peggy’s work friend. Monty Sipkin is the owner of the millinery shop where Peggy works, and he is dating one of her old friends from school, Jane. Jane invites Monty and Peggy to visit her family's extensive Westport estate. Knowing that her rich father would not approve of Monty, Jane has Monty pose as Peggy's half-brother Billy. Everyone ends up together in Westport, and farcical complications arise before all ends happily.

== Songs ==
Act I

- "Tell Me More" - Peggy and Kenneth
- "Mr and Mrs Sipkin" - Monty and Shop Girls
- "Why Do I Love You?" - Jane, Monty, Boys and Girls
- "When the Debbies Go By"
- "Three Times a Day" - Peggy and Kenneth
- "How Can I Win You Now?"
- "Kickin' the Clouds Away" - Billy, Monty and Jane

Act II

- "Love Is in the Air" - Boys and Girls
- "My Fair Lady" - Peggy and Boys
- "In Sardinia"
- "Baby!" - Bonnie, Billy, Boys and Girls
- "Shopgirls and Mannequins"
- "Ukulele Lorelei" - Bonnie and Girls
- "The He-Man"
- "Murderous Monty (and Light-Fingered Jane)"
- "Love, I Never Knew"
