= David Garrison =

American actor (born 1952)

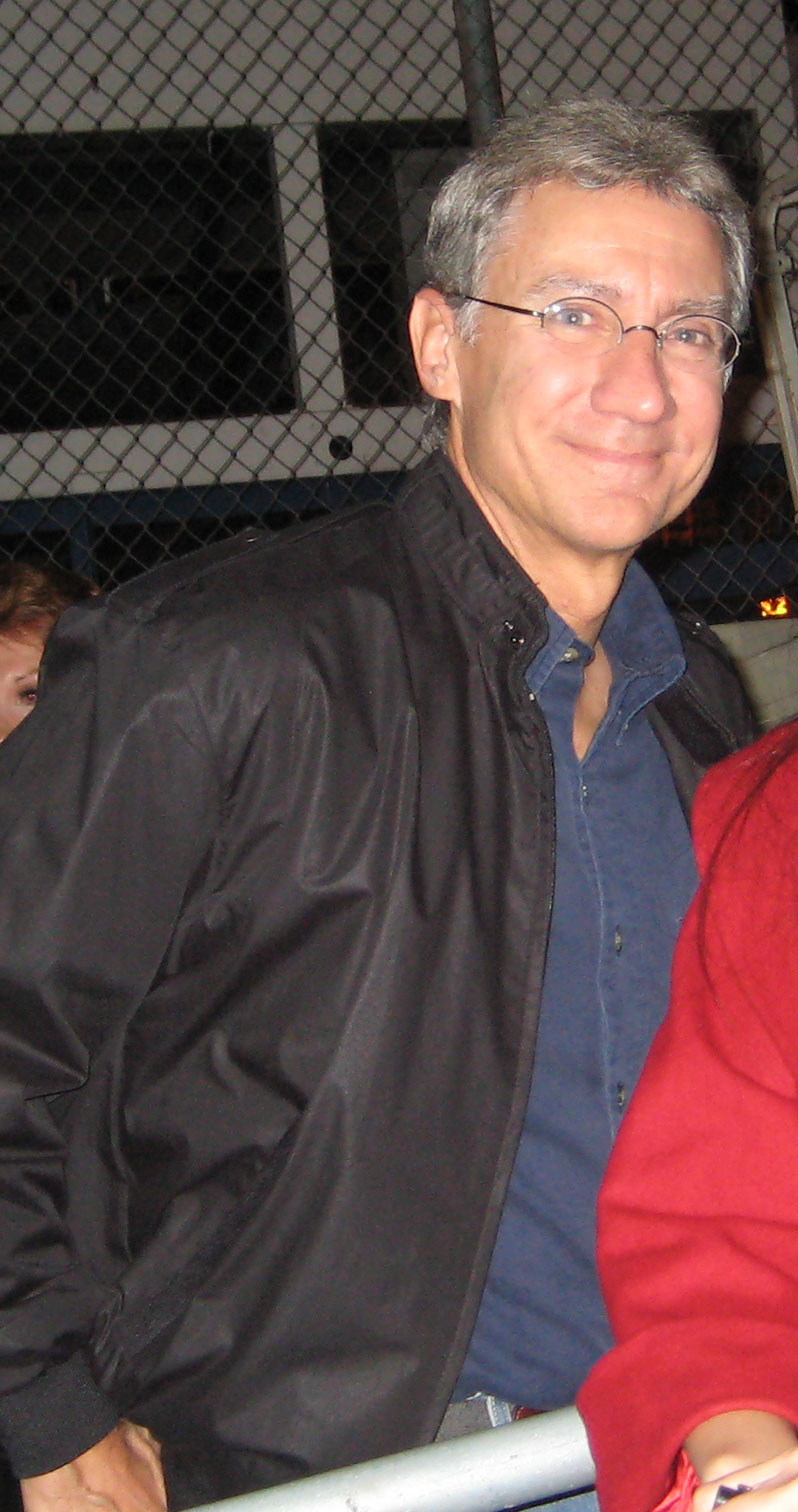
- Garrison at the Pantages Theater, November 2008
- Born: David Earl Garrison; June 30, 1952 (age 74); Long Branch, New Jersey, U.S.
- Occupations: Actor, singer
- Years active: 1974–present

David Earl Garrison (born June 30, 1952) is an American actor and singer. He is best known for playing Steve Rhoades on the television series Married... with Children. He has also appeared in numerous theatrical roles, particularly that of The Wizard on both Broadway and in many tours of the musical Wicked.

== Early life ==
Garrison was born in Long Branch, New Jersey, the son of Earl B. Garrison, a school administrator and Maude B. Garrison, a teacher.

Garrison graduated from Freehold High School in 1970, where he began his acting career on the school's stage. He attended high school with Bruce Springsteen during his freshman year as Bruce graduated in 1967. He was inducted in the school's Hall of Fame in 2007. Garrison graduated summa cum laude from Boston University's College of Fine Arts in 1974. Following graduation, he became a member of the resident company at Arena Stage in Washington, D.C., for several years.

== Career ==
Although he is known for his television roles and continues to appear frequently in guest-starring roles on television today, Garrison is primarily a theatre actor, particularly in musicals. He has appeared in numerous productions around the United States, including many Broadway shows. His Broadway appearances include A Day in Hollywood / A Night in the Ukraine for which he received a Tony Award nomination, Wicked, The Visit, Titanic, Torch Song Trilogy, The Pirates of Penzance, Bells Are Ringing, A History of the American Film, and The Great Society. (Note: The Great Society is a follow-up play to All the Way, both about Lyndon Johnson and the Civil Rights Act of 1964.) His Off-Broadway credits include I Do! I Do!, for which he received a Drama Desk Award nomination, Dead Poets Society, Middletown, New Jerusalem, Geniuses, It’s Only a Play, By the Way Meet Vera Stark, The Cradle Will Rock, and Silence! The Musical. In addition to the cast albums of Hollywood/Ukraine, Titanic, Bells Are Ringing, The Visit, I Do! I Do!, and On the Town, his many recordings include Songs of New York, Show Boat, Kiss Me Kate, Annie Get Your Gun, Of Thee I Sing/Let ’Em Eat Cake, Girl Crazy, You Never Know, Tell Me More, Oh! Lady! Lady!!, George and Ira Standards and Gems, and, as a guest artist, Dawn Upshaw Sings Rodgers and Hart.”.

On tour, Garrison played Nathan Detroit in Guys and Dolls, and the Wizard in Wicked, for which he received a Carbonell Award. In regional theatre, he has played the Devil in Randy Newman's Faust (La Jolla/Goodman), Henry Carr in Travesties (Williamstown), Frosch in Die Fledermaus (Santa Fe Opera), Pangloss in Candide (Glimmerglass), Gaston in You Never Know (Pasadena Playhouse), Fagin in Oliver (Paper Mill Playhouse), Leonardo da Vinci in Ever After (Alliance Theatre), and Charley in the Arena Stage revival of Merrily We Roll Along for which he received a Helen Hayes Award. In London, he starred with Tyne Daly, Frederica Von Stade, Kurt Ollmann, and Thomas Hampson in a concert presentation of On the Town, which was broadcast on Great Performances for PBS. In 2015, he reprised the role of Police Sergeant in the New York City Center production of The Pirates of Penzance.

Garrison has also appeared in numerous roles on television. In 1984–85, he starred as Norman Lamb on the sitcom It's Your Move, opposite Jason Bateman. In 1987, Garrison landed his best-known role, portraying Steve Rhoades, next-door neighbor to the Bundy family on the popular sitcom Married... with Children.

Garrison enjoyed his years playing Steve Rhoades, but he missed performing in live theatre, and left the show after four seasons. He was a regular on an NBC sitcom, Working It Out, shortly after his exit from Married... with Children. Nonetheless, Garrison parted on good terms, returning four times in subsequent seasons (and the reunion special) detailing the career Rhoades had pursued since he'd last been seen. He even parodied his own role on the show Nikki.

Other television credits include Unbreakable Kimmy Schmidt, Madam Secretary, The West Wing, 30 Rock, Law & Order, The Practice, Without a Trace, Everybody Loves Raymond, NYPD Blue, Judging Amy, Murphy Brown, Murder, She Wrote, L.A. Law, Tom Clancy's Op-Center, The Good Wife and, for PBS Great Performances, On the Town with the London Symphony Orchestra and Ira Gershwin at 100: A Celebration at Carnegie Hall. Garrison also participated in several installments of Pyramid as a celebrity guest, most notably helping a contestant win $100,000 during a Tournament episode of The $100,000 Pyramid in 1988.

=== Wicked ===
He had the role of The Wizard in the first national tour of Wicked when it began in the States (after it had started a run on Broadway) on March 8, 2005, finishing his year-long run on March 6, 2006. He then starred as the Wizard in the Broadway company from April 4, 2006 replacing Ben Vereen. After 15 months in the role he played his final performance on July 8, 2007. Then he temporarily starred in the Chicago company from September 30–October 28, 2007, and then starred in the Los Angeles company beginning August 26, 2008, until its closure on January 11, 2009. He played the role in the San Francisco production, which officially opened on February 6, 2009 and played his final performance with the production on May 31, 2009 in order to pursue a role in a new play.

== Credits ==
=== Television ===
- The Edge of Night-Cody Patrick (1978–1979)
- Remington Steele (1984)
- It's Your Move —series regular (1984–1985)
- Married.. with Children—series regular / guest (1987–1990, 1992, 1993, 1995)
- Working It Out—series regular (1990)
- L.A. Law (1992)
- On the Town—PBS Great Performances (1993)
- Tom Clancy’s Op Center (1995)
- Murder, She Wrote (1995)
- Murphy Brown (1995)
- Law & Order (1996, 1998, 2000, 2009)
- Ira Gershwin at 100—A Celebration at Carnegie Hall (1997)
- Sabrina the Teenage Witch (2000)
- The Practice (2001, 2003)
- Ed (2001)
- Judging Amy (2001)
- Without a Trace (2004)
- Everybody Loves Raymond (2004)
- The West Wing (2005)
- NYPD Blue (2005)
- 30 Rock (2013)
- The Good Wife (2013)
- Madam Secretary (2016)
- Unbreakable Kimmy Schmidt (2017)

=== Stage ===
- A History of the American Film (1978)
- A Day in Hollywood/A Night in the Ukraine (1980)
- Geniuses (1982)
- Snoopy! The Musical (1982)
- The Pirates of Penzance (1982)
- Torch Song Trilogy (1983)
- Die Fledermaus (1986)
- It’s Only a Play (1986)
- You Never Know (1990)
- Merrily We Roll Along (1990)
- Guys and Dolls (1993)
- I Do! I Do! (1996)
- Randy Newman’s Faust (1995) (1996)
- Titanic (1997)
- Strike Up the Band (Encores! 1998)
- Over and Over (1999)
- The Torch-Bearers (2000)
- Bells Are Ringing (2001)
- Twelfth Night (2002)
- Travesties (2003)
- Singing Forest (2004)
- Wicked (2005) (2007) (2008) (2009)
- New Jerusalem (2008)
- Red Remembers (2009)
- Middletown (2010)
- Silence! The Musical (2011)
- By the Way, Meet Vera Stark (2011)
- Olive and the Bitter Herbs (2011)
- Oliver! (2013)
- Romeo and Juliet (2013)
- The Tale of the Allergist's Wife (2013)
- Candide (2015)
- The Visit (2015)
- The Pirates of Penzance (2015) (2016)
- Dead Poets Society (2016)
- Kid Victory (2017)
- Coming Back Like a Song (2018)
- The Will Rogers Follies (2018)
- The Great Society (2019)
- Working (Encores! 2019)
- The Cradle Will Rock (2019)
- Ever After (2019)

=== Discography ===
- The Visit (original cast album, Broadway Records, 2015)
- Poetic License: 100 Poems 100 Performers (GPR, 2010)
- Bells Are Ringing (original revival cast album, Verese Sarabande, 2001)
- You Never Know (original revival cast album, Ghostlight, 2001)
- Tell Me More (studio recording, Rob Fisher, New World, 2001)
- Titanic (original cast album, RCA, 1997)
- George and Ira Gershwin Standards and Gems (Nonesuch, 1996)
- Dawn Upshaw Sings Rodgers and Hart (Nonesuch, 1996)
- I Do! I Do! (original revival cast album, Varese Sarabande, 1996)
- On the Town (concert recording, Michael Tilson Thomas, London Symphony, Deutsche Grammophon, 1993)
- Annie Get Your Gun (studio recording, John McGlinn, EMI, 1991)
- Kiss Me, Kate (studio recording, John McGlinn, EMI, 1991)
- Girl Crazy (studio recording, John Mauceri, Roxbury, 1990)
- Showboat (studio recording, John McGlinn, EMI, 1988)
- Of Thee I Sing/Let ‘Em Eat Cake (concert recording, Michael Tilson Thomas, CBS, 1987)
- Oh, Lady! Lady!! (studio recording, John McGlinn, 1985)
- Songs of New York (John McGlinn, Book of the Month Club Records, 1984)
- A Day in Hollywood/A Night in the Ukraine (original cast album, DRG, 1980)

== Awards ==
Year	Award	Nominated work	Result
2019	Suzi Bass Award	Ever After	Nominated
2018	CT Critics Award	The Will Rogers Follies	Nominated
2006	Carbonell Award	Wicked	Won
1996	Drama Desk Award	I Do! I Do!	Nominated
1991	LA Drama Critics Award	You Never Know	Nominated
1991	Drama-Logue Award	You Never Know	Won
1991	Helen Hayes Award	Merrily We Roll Along	Won
1980	Tony Award	A Day in Hollywood/A Night in the Ukraine	Nominated
1980	Drama-Logue Award	A Day in Hollywood/A Night in the Ukraine	Won
