= Linda Day =

American television director (1938–2009)

- Born: Linda Gail Brickner; August 12, 1938; Los Angeles, California, U.S.
- Died: October 23, 2009 (aged 71); Georgetown, Texas, U.S.
- Other name: Linda Day Varnum
- Occupation: Television director
- Years active: 1976–2003

Linda Day Varnum (born Linda Gail Brickner; August 12, 1938 – October 23, 2009) was an American television director, working primarily in situation comedies.

== Early and personal life ==
Day was born Linda Gail Brickner on August 12, 1938, in Los Angeles, the daughter of Roy Brickner, a film editor. At age 67, she married L. Steve Varnum in Texas. She had a daughter. She died on October 23, 2009, aged 71, in Georgetown, Texas, from battling leukemia and breast cancer.

== Career ==
Day started as a script supervisor on the television film Victory at Entebbe, and on the soap opera parody Soap. She became an associate director for WKRP in Cincinnati in 1978, and began directing episodes of the show in 1980. Linda Day went on to direct a number of successful sitcoms in the 1980s and '90s, including the pilot of Married... with Children and 32 more episodes of the show. Day also directed four episodes of the soap opera Dallas during what would become the show's "dream season" in 1985–86, when the events of the entire season were explained away as being a character's dream.

In addition to a Primetime Emmy Award for Outstanding Directing for a Comedy Series nomination, she received a Humanitas Prize and was honored by the Directors Guild of America for paving the way for women in television; she directed more than 350 episodes and 50 series.

== Selected filmography ==
- Good Morning, Miami (2003)
- The Parkers (1999)
- Working (1997)
- Sabrina, the Teenage Witch (1996)
- Clueless (1996)
- Boston Common (1996)
- The Single Guy (1995)
- Simon (1995)
- The Crew (1995)
- The Parent 'Hood (1995)
- Unhappily Ever After (1995)
- The 5 Mrs. Buchanans (1994)
- Models Inc. (1994)
- The Nanny (1993)
- Thea (1993)
- Mad About You (1992)
- Top of the Heap (1991)
- Major Dad (1989)
- Married... with Children (1987)
- Throb (1986)
- Small Wonder (1985)
- It's Your Move (1984)
- Who's the Boss? (1984)
- Kate & Allie (1984)
- Newhart (1983)
- St. Elsewhere (1982)
- Gimme a Break! (1981)
- Knots Landing (1979)
- Archie Bunker's Place (1979)
- Benson (1979)
- Diff'rent Strokes (1978)
- WKRP in Cincinnati (1978)
- Dallas (1978)
- Soap (1977)
- Alice (1976)
- Insight (1960)
