= Gerry Cohen =

American television director

- Born: United States
- Occupation: Television director
- Years active: 1981–2019

Gerry Cohen is an American television and theatre director.

He began his career as a stage manager and associate director on the television series Fridays, The Golden Girls, Who's the Boss? and Married... with Children, making his network directorial debut on the latter series. He eventually directed 156 of the show's 262 episodes. His other television credits include The Drew Carey Show, Unhappily Ever After, Nikki, The Norm Show, George Lopez, Still Standing, Freddie, Anger Management, The Carmichael Show, and a number of other series.
