= Amanda Bearse =

American actress

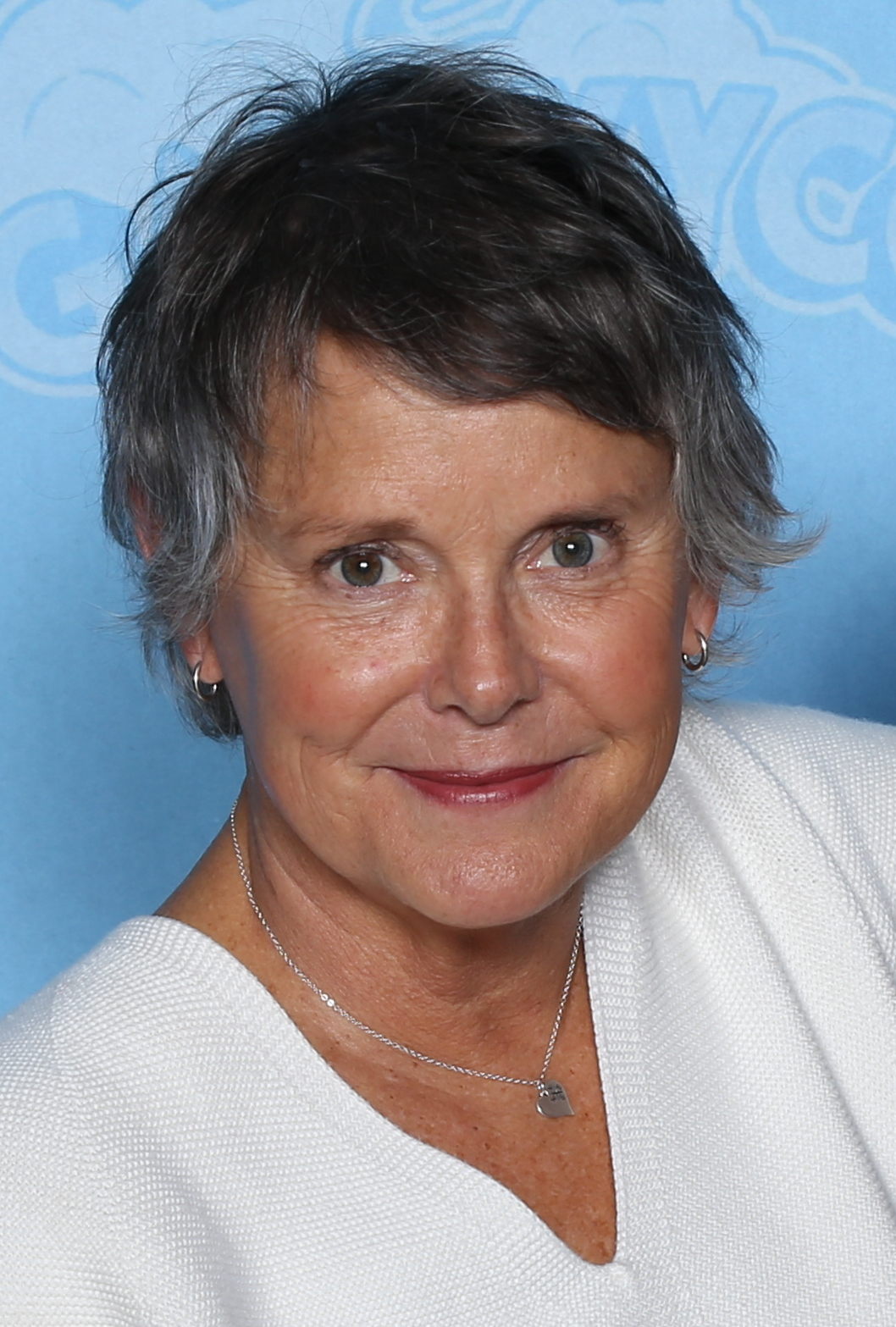
- Bearse at GalaxyCon Louisville in 2019
- Occupations: Actress; comedian; director
- Years active: 1982–present
- Children: 1

Amanda Bearse is an American actress, comedian and director. She starred in the 1985 supernatural horror film Fright Night, and later starred as Marcy Rhoades D'Arcy in the Fox sitcom Married... with Children (1987–1997). Bearse later began working as a television director, directing over 90 episodes of several comedy series.

== Early life ==
Bearse grew up in Winter Park, Florida. After she graduated from Winter Park High School in 1976, her family moved to Atlanta. She attended Rollins College and graduated from Birmingham–Southern College. Bearse studied acting at New York City's Neighborhood Playhouse under instructor Sanford Meisner.

== Career ==
Bearse made her television debut playing the role of Amanda Cousins in the ABC daytime soap opera All My Children from 1982 to 1983. The following year, she had a small role in the comedy film Protocol starring Goldie Hawn, and later landed a role in the sex comedy Fraternity Vacation. In 1985, Bearse played the female leading role in the supernatural horror film Fright Night. She returned to television with a guest-starring role in the ABC drama series, Hotel in 1986. The following year, she was cast as Marcy Rhoades (later Marcy D'Arcy), the feminist next-door neighbor in the Fox sitcom Married... with Children opposite Ed O'Neill and Katey Sagal. The series ran to 1997, becoming one of the longest running sitcoms in television history.

Bearse studied directing at the American Film Institute and the University of Southern California. She began directing television while appearing on Married...with Children, and from 1991 to 1997, she directed 31 episodes of the show. She also directed episodes of Reba, Mad TV, Nick Freno: Licensed Teacher, Malcolm & Eddie, Pauly, The Tom Show, The Jamie Foxx Show, Dharma & Greg, Veronica's Closet, Two Guys, a Girl and a Pizza Place, Jesse (1999; starring her Married...with Children costar Christina Applegate), Jessie (2011), and Ladies Man. She also directed The George Lopez Show. In 2005, she directed The Sperm Donor, a pilot for NBC starring Maggie Wheeler. In 2006, Bearse teamed with Rosie O'Donnell to produce and direct The Big Gay Sketch Show, which debuted on Logo on April 24, 2007.

Bearse appeared as an actress in only two films in the 1990s: The Doom Generation and Here Come the Munsters (both 1995). She returned to acting in 2011, appearing in two episodes of Lifetime comedy-drama series, Drop Dead Diva. In 2020, she starred in the German comedy horror film, Sky Sharks, making her first film appearance in 25 years. In 2022, Bearse played Luke Macfarlane's mother in the romantic comedy film, Bros.

== Personal life ==
Bearse has been publicly out as lesbian since 1993 and has a daughter named Zoe.

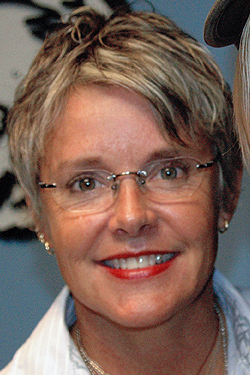
Bearse in 2005

== Filmography ==
=== Film ===
Year	Title	Role	Notes
1983	First Affair	Karen	Television film
1984	Protocol	Soap Opera Actor	
1985	Fraternity Vacation	Nicole Ferret	
1985	Fright Night	Amy Peterson	
1988	Goddess of Love	Cathy	Television film
1995	Here Come the Munsters	Mrs. Pearl	Television film
1995	The Doom Generation	Barmaid	
2003	Give or Take an Inch	Charlotte	Short film
2020	Sky Sharks	Marjorie Phelps	
2022	Bros	Anne Shepard	
2024	Tapawingo	Ramona Skoog	

=== Television ===
Year	Title	Role	Notes
1982–1983	All My Children	Amanda Cousins	Series regular
1986	Hotel	Jean Haywood	Episode: "Triangles"
1987–1997	Married... with Children	Marcy D'Arcy / Marcy Rhoades / Mandy	Series regular, 259 episodes; also director for 31 episodes
1990	The Earth Day Special	Marcy D'Arcy	Television special
1992	Likely Suspects		Episode: "Addicted to Murder"
2001	Nikki	Marcy Rhoades	Episode: "Technical Knockup"
2011	Drop Dead Diva	Judge Jodi Corliss	Episodes: "Prom" and "You Bet Your Life"
2013	Anger Management	Rita	Episode: "Charlie and the Ex-Patient"
