= Michael G. Moye =

American screenwriter

- Born: Michael George Moye; August 11, 1954 (age 71); New Haven, Connecticut, U.S.
- Occupations: Television writer, producer, photographer
- Spouse: Rose Jackson (m. 1996)
- Children: 2

Michael George Moye (born August 11, 1954) is an American photographer and a former television writer and producer. In his television career he has written for shows such as The Jeffersons, Diff'rent Strokes, Good Times, and 227, and produced It's Your Move and The Jeffersons. His best-known work is the 1987 series Married... with Children, created with Ron Leavitt for the then-fledgling Fox network.

== Early career ==
Moye began his career in 1977 with a staff writing position on Good Times. Between 1979 and 1984, he wrote for The Jeffersons, and in 1982 he co-developed Silver Spoons, which ran for five seasons. He also co-developed both It's Your Move and 227 (with Bill Boulware), the latter under alias C.J. Banks.

=== Married... with Children ===
Married... with Children, created by Moye and Leavitt in 1987 for the Fox network, was called an "anti-family" series or "the anti-Cosby", Moye and Leavitt being fed up with the idealized family of the sitcoms of the 1980s. They created the couple Al-Peggy by imagining a fictional union between Roseanne Barr and Sam Kinison.

Moye was a producer and a writer on the show for most of its run, and had a hand in writing a series-leading 25 episodes as well as having a few cameo appearances on screen. The show ran for 11 seasons and was credited with keeping the fledgling Fox network "in the black for five or six years." The show has been the target of conservative political campaigns several times. In 1993, he refused to modify a two-episode show (the one where Al Bundy lobbies in Congress after his favorite show Psycho Dad was cancelled), accusing instead Fox to be too soft with censorship regulators.

== Personal life ==
Moye retired from television in 1995 and is now a photographer and an avid coral reef aquarium hobbyist. He has two children from two marriages.

In 1992, Michael G. Moye acquired a 13,749-square-feet estate in Conyers Farm in Greenwich Connecticut, for $1.5 million. It was put up for sale for $8.595 million in November 2017. He also owned a house in Encino that he sold for $1.65 million in 2017, and bought a 2000-square-feet residence on sugar sand beaches in North Carolina in 2006.

== Filmography ==
- Good Times (1978)
- Diff'rent Strokes (1979)
- The Jeffersons (1979) (Creative Consultant, Executive Story Editor)
- Sanford (1980)
- Checking In (1981)
- Silver Spoons (1982)
- It's Your Move (1984) (co-creator, with Ron Leavitt)
- 227 (1985–1990) (Credited as "C.J. Banks", co-creator, with Bill Boulware)
- Married... with Children (1987–1997) (Co-Creator, with Ron Leavitt)
- Women in Prison (1987) (Co-Creator with Ron Leavitt and Katherine Green)
