= Ron Leavitt =

American television writer and producer

Ronald Leavitt
- Born: November 7, 1947; New York City, New York, U.S.
- Died: February 10, 2008 (aged 60); Los Angeles, California, U.S.
- Education: University of Miami
- Occupations: Television writer, producer
- Years active: 1977–2008
- Spouse: Sharyn Leavitt (divorced)
- Partner: Jessica Hahn (1991–2008)
- Children: 2

Ronald Leavitt (November 7, 1947 – February 10, 2008) was an American television writer and producer. He was the co-creator (with Michael G. Moye) of the American television show Married... with Children. The show's 259 episodes over 11 seasons made it the second-longest lasting sitcom on the Fox network.

== Life and career ==
Raised in a Jewish family in Brooklyn, Leavitt graduated from the University of Miami with a journalism degree. After working as a journalist in Miami, Leavitt began his television career in 1977 writing episodes for sitcom Busting Loose. He would later write for Happy Days, Laverne & Shirley, and The Bad News Bears (for which he garnered an NAACP award). In the early 1980s, in addition to writing and producing The Jeffersons (for which he won a People's Choice Award and a second NAACP award), Leavitt co-wrote the pilot for Silver Spoons and co-created and executive produced the Jason Bateman sitcom It's Your Move.

In the late 1980s, Leavitt co-created Married... with Children, which, with its debut on the Fox network in 1987, broke many of the established rules and mores of television. He served as executive producer and wrote or co-wrote close to 150 episodes. Its longevity over 11 seasons made Married... with Children the second-longest running sitcom on Fox, just behind The Simpsons. Among its industry honors, Married... with Children earned seven Emmy nominations and an equal number of Golden Globe nominations, including Best TV Series.

The show became a springboard for Leavitt to create a number of spin-offs, initially Top of the Heap, starring Matt LeBlanc and Joseph Bologna, and Vinnie & Bobby, starring Matt LeBlanc and Robert Torti. He subsequently co-created, executive produced, and wrote Unhappily Ever After. Leavitt also created and wrote several episodes of the WB's The Help.

Other achievements outside television include recognition by the State of California as Citizen Hero of the Year in 2001, and the equally notable accomplishment of out-eating wrestler King Kong Bundy in a cheesesteak sandwich-eating contest at Dominick's Kitchen while Bundy was guest-starring on Married... with Children.

He had two children. He died on February 10, 2008, from lung cancer. At the time of his death, he was engaged to Jessica Hahn.

== Filmography ==
- Busting Loose (1977)
- Happy Days (1978)
- Brothers and Sisters (1979)
- Makin' It (1979)
- The Bad News Bears (1979)
- Laverne & Shirley (1979)
- Silver Spoons (1982)
- The Jeffersons (1980–1984)
- It's Your Move (1984–1985) (Co-creator, with Michael G. Moye)
- Married... with Children (1987–1997) (Co-creator, with Michael G. Moye)
- Top of the Heap (1991) (Co-creator, with Arthur Silver)
- Vinnie & Bobby (1992) (Co-creator, with Arthur Silver)
- Unhappily Ever After (1995) (Co-creator, with Arthur Silver)
- The Help (2004)
