= Alabama State University =

Public university in Montgomery, Alabama, U.S.

Coordinates: 32.364°N 86.295°W

- The Alabama State University Seal
- Former names: Lincoln Normal School of Marion (1867–1887); Normal School for Colored Students (1887–1929); State Teachers College (1929–1948); Alabama State College for Negroes (1948–1954); Alabama State College (1954–1969)
- Type: Public historically black university
- Established: 1867; 159 years ago
- Academic affiliations: TMCF
- Endowment: $125 million (2024)
- President: Quinton T. Ross Jr.
- Provost: Carl Pettis
- Students: 4,081 (fall 2024)
- Undergraduates: 3,521
- Postgraduates: 560
- Location: Montgomery, Alabama, United States
- Campus: Urban, 172 acres
- Newspaper: The Hornet Tribune
- Colors: Black and old gold
- Nickname: Hornets and Lady Hornets
- Sporting affiliations: NCAA Division I FCS – SWAC
- Website: www.alasu.edu

Alabama State University (Alabama State, 'Bama State, or ASU) is a public historically Black university (HBCU) in Montgomery, Alabama, United States. Founded in 1867 during the Reconstruction era, it was one of about 180 "normal schools" established by state governments in the 19th century to train teachers for the rapidly growing public common schools. It was one of 23 established to train African-Americans to teach in segregated schools. ASU is a member-school of the Thurgood Marshall College Fund.

Alabama State's athletic teams, known as the Hornets, compete in NCAA Division I as members of the Southwestern Athletic Conference (SWAC).

== History ==
Alabama State University was founded in 1867 as the Lincoln Normal School of Marion in Marion. In December 1874, the State Board accepted the transfer of title to the school after a legislative act was passed authorizing the state to fund a Normal School, and George N. Card was named president. Thus, in 1874, this predecessor of Alabama State University became America's first state-supported educational institution for blacks. This began ASU's history as a "teachers' college."

The second president, William Burns Paterson, was appointed in 1878. He is honored as a founder of Alabama State University and was the president for 37 of the school's first 48 years. Paterson was instrumental in the move from Marion to Montgomery in 1887.

In 1887, the university opened in its new location in Montgomery, but an Alabama State Supreme Court ruling forced the school to change its name; it was renamed the Normal School for Colored Students. The campus was chosen in 1889 although preparing the buildings at the site took a while longer.

In the decades that followed, Lincoln Normal School became a junior college, and in 1928 became a full four-year institution. In 1929 it became State Teachers College, Alabama State College for Negroes in 1948, and Alabama State College in 1954. In 1969, the State Board of Education, then the governing body of the university, approved a name change; the institution became Alabama State University.

The 1995 Knight vs. Alabama remedial decree transformed ASU into a comprehensive regional institution paving the way for two new undergraduate programs, four new graduate programs, diversity scholarship funding and endowment, funding to build a state-of-the art health sciences facility, and a facility renewal allocation to refurbish three existing buildings.

WVAS-FM was launched on June 15, 1984, beaming 25,000 watts of power from the fifth floor of the Levi Watkins Learning Center for two years before moving to its current location at Thomas Kilby Hall. Today, WVAS has grown to 80,000 watts and has a listenership that spans 18 counties, reaching a total population of more than 651,000. In recent years, the station has also begun streaming its broadcast via the Web, connecting a global audience to the university.

The early 1990s witnessed the beginning of WAPR-FM (Alabama Public Radio), which Alabama State University and Troy University, both of which already held station licenses of their own, cooperated with the University of Alabama in building and operating. WAPR-FM 88.3—Selma's signal reaches the region known colloquially as the Black Belt, about 13 counties in the west central and central parts of Alabama, including the city of Montgomery.

In 2021, ASU received a $24.7 million federal grant from the U.S. Department of Education to help Montgomery Public Schools students better prepare for a higher education. This is the largest single grant in the history of the institution. In 2025, MacKenzie Scott donated $38 million to ASU. Her donation is the largest single gift in ASU's history.

== Academics ==
ASU has eight degree-granting colleges, schools, or divisions:

- College of Business Administration
- College of Education
- College of Health Sciences
- College of Liberal Arts & Social Sciences
- College of Science, Mathematics & Technology
- College of Visual & Performing Arts
- Division of Aerospace Studies
- Continuing Education

Alabama State offers 47 degree programs including 31 bachelor's, 11 master's, 2 Education Specialist, and 3 doctoral programs. In addition, the university offers the W.E.B. DuBois Honors Program for undergraduate students who meet the above average performance criteria.

Due to Alabama State offering only bachelor's degree in Biomedical Engineering and Mechanical Engineering, the university established a dual degree engineering partnership with Auburn University and the University of Alabama at Birmingham (UAB) that gives qualified ASU students automatic admissions into Auburn and UAB undergraduate engineering programs. ASU undergraduate students who successfully complete the program will receive a STEM related bachelor's degree from ASU and an engineering bachelor's degree from Auburn or UAB in approximately five years.

Alabama State is accredited by the Commission on Colleges of the Southern Association of Colleges and Schools. Specific programs are also accredited by relevant specialized accreditors.

=== Research centers ===
Research centers at the university include:

- Center for Nanobiotechnology Research
- Research Infrastructure & Minority Institutions
- Center for Leadership & Public Policy
- East Asian Institute for Business Research and Culture
- Urban Economic Research Development Center
- National Center for the Study of Civil Rights and African-American Culture

== Organization and administration ==
=== Capital campaigns and major endowments ===
Under the leadership of President Leon Howard, Alabama State University ran its largest capital campaign, the Endowment for Excellence, which provided $1.5 million for the university.

In 2025, Mackenzie Scott endowed the university with a $38 million donation, the largest donation that Alabama State University had received.

== Campus ==
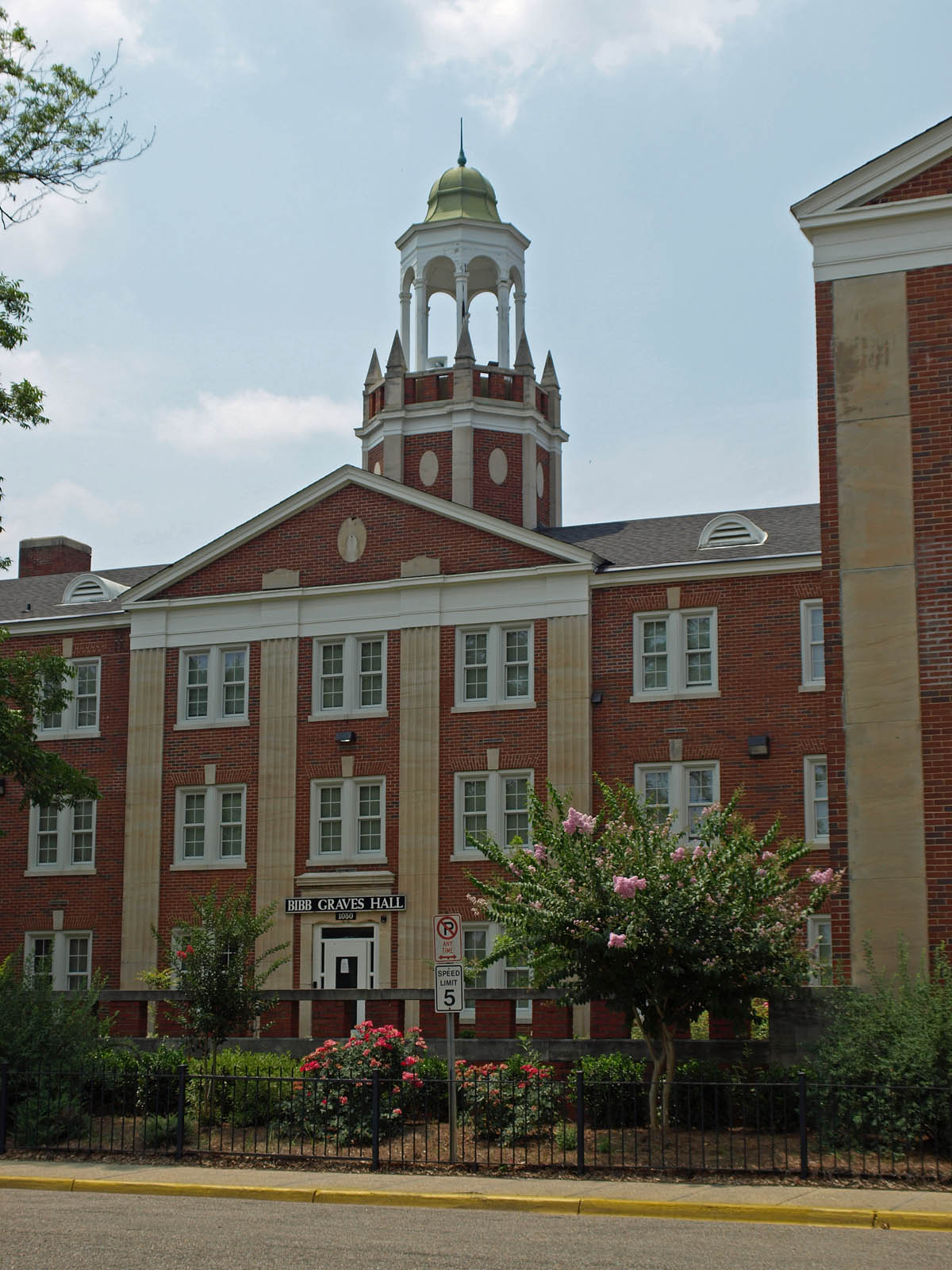
Jo Ann Robinson Hall

ASU's urban, 172-acre (0.70 km^{2}) campus has Georgian-style red-brick classroom buildings and architecturally contemporary structures. ASU is home to the state-of-the-art 7,400-seat academic and sports facility the ASU Acadome; the Levi Watkins Learning Center, a five-story brick structure with more than 267,000 volumes; the state-of-the-art John L. Buskey Health Sciences Center which is an 80,000 square foot (7,400 m^{2}) facility which houses classrooms, offices, an interdisciplinary clinic, three therapeutic rehabilitation labs, a state-of-the-art Gross Anatomy Lab, Laboratory for the Analysis of Human Motion (LAHM), a Women's Health/Cardiopulmonary lab, and a health sciences computer lab; and WVAS-FM 90.7, the 80,000-watt, university operated public radio station.

== Student life ==
Undergraduate demographics as of fall 2023
| Race and ethnicity | Total |
|---|---|
| Black | 91% |
| International student | 2% |
| Unknown | 2% |
| White | 2% |
| Hispanic | 1% |
| Two or more races | 1% |
Economic diversity
| Low-income (Note: The percentage of students who received an income-based federal Pell grant intended for low-income students.) | 71% |
| Affluent (Note: The percentage of students who are a part of the American middle class at the bare minimum.) | 29% |

Alabama State University has nearly 6,000 students from more than 40 states and over 20 countries. Approximately 40% of the student body come from outside Alabama.

=== Athletics ===
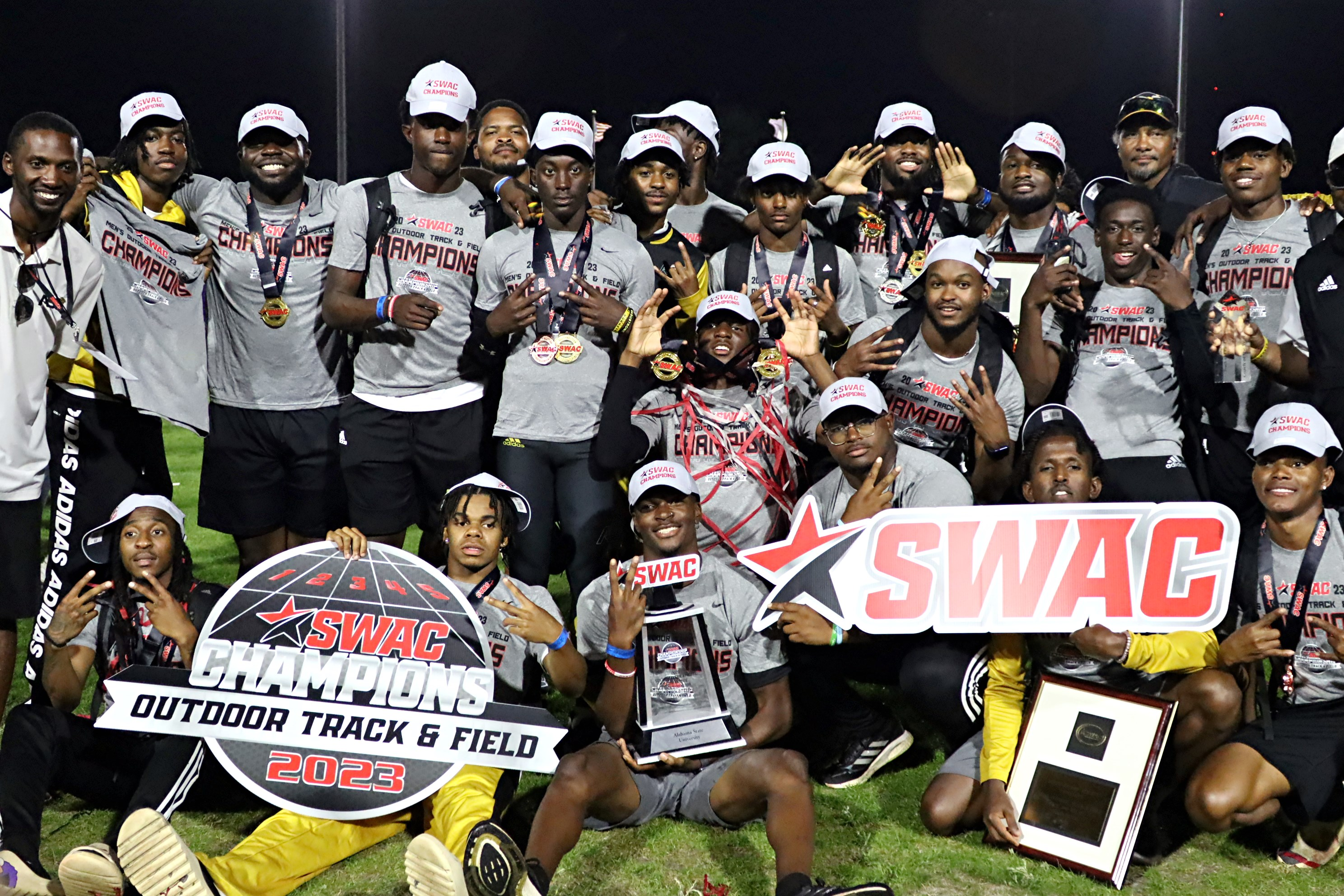
The Hornets outdoor track team celebrating a victory at the 2023 SWAC Outdoor Track & Field Championship

The Alabama State University Department of Athletics currently sponsors men's intercollegiate football, baseball, basketball, golf, tennis, track and cheerleading, along with women's intercollegiate basketball, soccer, softball, bowling, tennis, track, volleyball, golf and cheerleading. Sports teams participate in National Collegiate Athletic Association (NCAA) Division I (FCS – Football Championship Subdivision for football) in the Southwestern Athletic Conference (SWAC), which it joined in 1982. The university's colors are black and old gold and their athletic teams are known as the Hornets.

=== The Mighty Marching Hornets ===
Alabama State's marching band is officially known as "The Mighty Marching Hornets". The band has been nationally recognized. They perform at most football games, all SWAC basketball home games, and other special events.

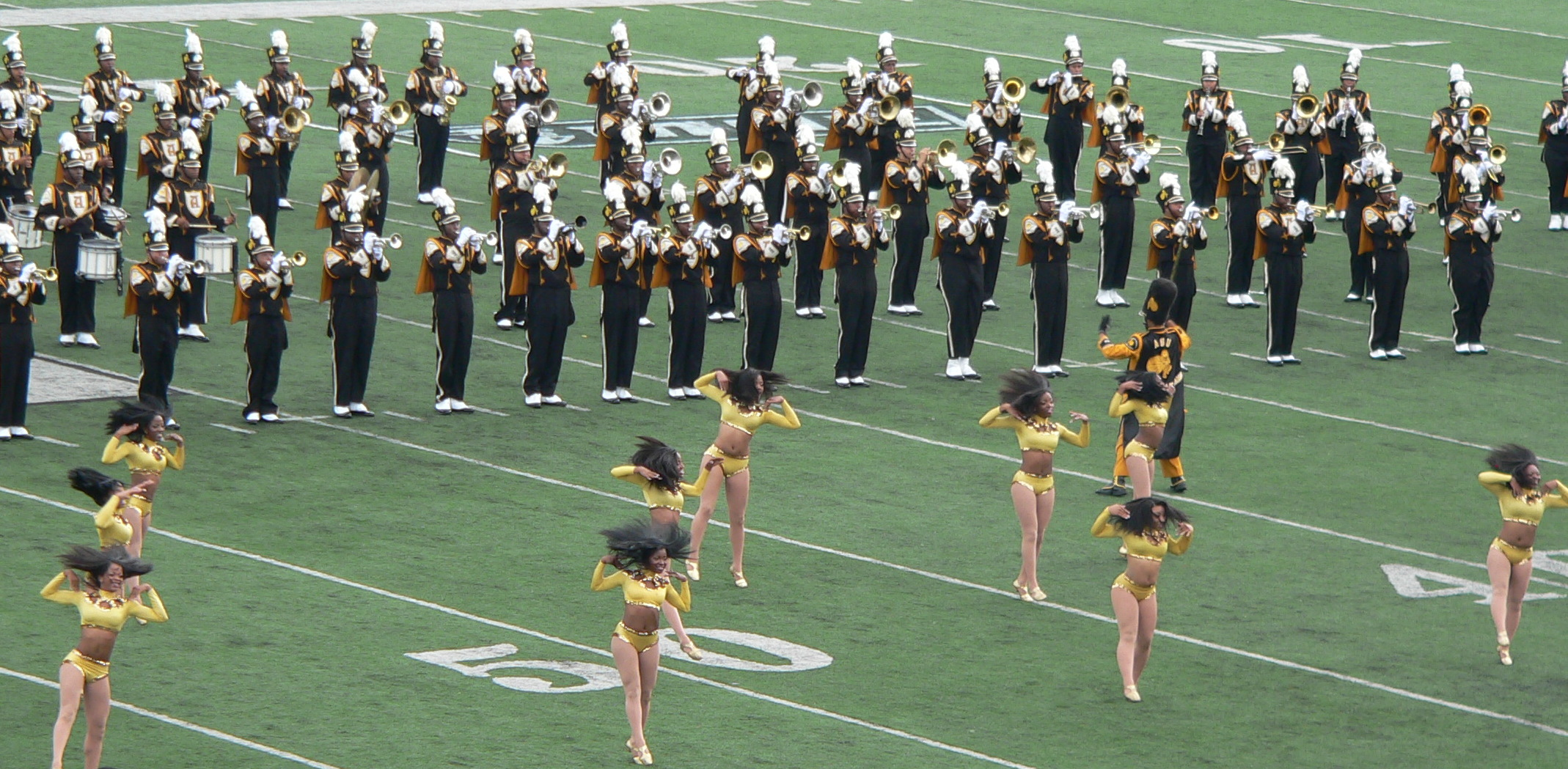
The Mighty Marching Hornets and Sensational Stingettes

The Mighty Marching Hornets were featured in the documentary series Bama State Style, which followed the lives of the students in the band. In 2016, the Mighty Marching Hornets made an appearance in Ang Lee's film Billy Lynn's Long Halftime Walk.

In 2017, the band's 2012 halftime performance at the Magic City Classic garnered over three million views on YouTube. The band performed in the 2019 Rose Parade in Pasadena, California on New Year's Day. In 2023, Alabama State became the first HBCU to host the annual Honda Battle of the Bands. The band is traditionally led by four or five drum majors.

The featured auxiliary is "The Sensational Stingettes", a danceline that debuted in 1977. They were invited to appear in the "Give It 2 U" music video and a live televised performance with artists Robin Thicke, Kendrick Lamar, and 2 Chainz. Also, they were shown in Beyonce's Netflix special "HΘMΣCΘMING: A film by Beyonce".

The most recently added auxiliary is "The Honey-Beez", a danceline composed of only plus-size young women that debuted in 2004. In 2017, they were selected to showcase their talents and compete on America's Got Talent. In 2020, they starred in a docuseries on Snapchat.

=== The Bama State Collegians ===
The Bama State Collegians is a big band jazz orchestra sponsored by Alabama State University. In the 1930s, the ensemble was directed by noted jazz trumpeter Erskine Hawkins, an inductee of both the Alabama Jazz Hall of Fame and the Alabama Music Hall of Fame. After moving to New York City, the Collegians, directed by Hawkins, became the Erskine Hawkins Orchestra and produced a string of national hit records, including "Tuxedo Junction", "After Hours", "Tippin' In" and others. The song "Tuxedo Junction", with its recordings by Hawkins and by the Glenn Miller Orchestra, became one of the anthems of World War II. In 2011, Hawkins' story of and his start in the Bama State Collegians was the subject of a Florida State University Film School MFA thesis film, The Collegians, written and directed by Alabama State University alumnus Bryan Lewis.

=== Student publications ===
Students are served by two media publications, The Hornet Tribune (student newspaper) and The Hornet (the student yearbook).

== See also ==
- WVAS 90.7 FM Radio, Alabama State radio station
- Magic City Classic, one of the largest HBCU events and FCS football games in the nation
- Turkey Day Classic, one of the oldest HBCU football classics in the nation

== Notable people ==
=== Notable alumni ===
| Name | Class year | Notability | Reference(s) |
|---|---|---|---|
| 2 Chainz | | rapper, played basketball for two seasons while attending | |
| Ralph Abernathy | 1950 | civil rights leader and minister | |
| Reggie Barlow | 1996 | former professional football wide receiver and current head football coach of the DC Defenders | |
| Brad Baxter | | former football running back who played 6 seasons in the NFL for the New York Jets (1989–1995) | |
| Aurelia Browder | | civil rights activist and plaintiff in the case Browder v. Gayle | |
| Clarence Carter | 1960 | soul singer and musician, best known for his hits "Strokin'", "Patches", and "Snatching It Back" | |
| London "Deelishis" Charles | | winner of reality show Flavor of Love 2 | |
| Michael Coe | 2007 | NFL defensive back | |
| James Daniel | 1974 | tight ends coach for the Pittsburgh Steelers | |
| Steven Daniel | 1993 | actor and comedian | |
| Thomas Figures | 1966 | first African-American assistant district attorney and assistant United States attorney | |
| Fred Gray | | attorney who represented Rosa Parks during the Montgomery bus boycott | |
| Erskine Hawkins | | jazz musician, composer of "Tuxedo Junction" | |
| Dorothy E. Hayes | | early Black graphic designer, educator, and curator | |
| Tarvaris Jackson | 2006 | professional football player, quarterback for the Seattle Seahawks | |
| Terren Jones | 2012 | NFL offensive lineman | |
| Lil Yachty | | vocalist | |
| Kevin Loder | 1981 | former NBA player for the Kansas City Kings and San Diego Clippers | |
| Manny Martin | | former NFL defensive back for the Buffalo Bills during the 1990s | |
| Tangi Miller | 1993 | actress with The WB's Felicity | |
| Travis Pearson | | former Arena Football League player | |
| Eddie Robinson | | former linebacker, who played 11 seasons in the NFL for the Houston Oilers, Jacksonville Jaguars, Tennessee Titans, and the Buffalo Bills; started for the Titans in Super Bowl XXXIV | |
| Quinton Ross | | member of the Alabama Senate, representing the 26th District | |
| Eugene Sawyer | 1956 | politician and businessman, mayor of Chicago 1987–1989 | |
| Dr. Fred Shuttlesworth | | civil rights leader and minister, co-founder of the Southern Christian Leadership Council | |
| Rickey Smiley | 1992 | comedian and actor | |
| Felix Stallings, Jr. | | electronica artist, producer, and DJ Felix da housecat | |
| Troy Stubbs | | Member of the Alabama House of Representatives | |
| Jessie Tompkins | 1998 | former nationally ranking athlete in track and field; head coach for the East Montgomery Track Club; first African-American student to challenge the State of Alabama’s White-only, race-based scholarships | |
| Fred Wesley | | jazz and funk trombonist, known for his work with James Brown in the 1960s and 1970s | |
| Jesse White | | 37th secretary of state of Illinois | |
| Doug Williams | 1995 | comedian and actor | |
| Marcus Winn | | former linebacker for the Edmonton Eskimos and the Winnipeg Blue Bombers of the Canadian Football League | |

=== Notable faculty ===
| Name | Department | Notability | Reference |
|---|---|---|---|
| Harold Franklin | | first black student at Auburn University | |
| Alvin Holmes | | alumnus and member of the Alabama State Legislature, representing the 78th District (Montgomery) | |
| Jo Ann Robinson | | leader in the Montgomery, Alabama Women's Political Council and the Montgomery bus boycott | |
| Tonea Stewart | Theatre | actress, playwright, and dean of the College of Visual and Performing Arts | |
| Josephine Turpin Washington | Mathematics | 1886 Howard University alumnus, early writer on civil rights topics | |
| Sheyann Webb-Christburg | Social Studies | civil rights activist, author of Selma Lord Selma!, and Dr. Martin Luther King's proclaimed "smallest freedom fighter" | |

=== Presidents ===
Interim presidents excluded

1. 1874–1878: George N. Card
2. 1878–1915: William Burns Paterson
3. 1915–1920: John William Beverly
4. 1920–1925: George Washington Trenholm
5. 1925–1961: Harper Councill Trenholm
6. 1962–1981: Levi Watkins Sr.
7. 1981–1983: Robert L. Randolph
8. 1983–1991: Leon Howard
9. 1991–1994: Clifford C. Baker
10. 1994–2000: William Hamilton Harris
11. 2001–2008: Joe A. Lee
12. 2008–2012: William Hamilton Harris
13. 2012: Joseph H. Silver Sr.
14. 2014–2016: Gwendolyn Boyd
15. 2017–present: Quinton T. Ross Jr.
