= Drum major =

Drum major may refer to:

- Drum major (marching band), leader of a civilian marching band, drum and bugle corps, or pipe band
- Drum major (military), leader of a military band, pipes and drums, or corps of drums

== See also ==
- Drum major general, former royal appointment in the British Army
- Drum Major Institute, American progressive think tank
