= WVAS =

Jazz music radio station in Montgomery, Alabama

- Montgomery, Alabama; United States
- Frequency: 90.7 MHz (HD Radio)

Programming
- Format: Jazz
- Subchannels: HD2: Bama State Radio (Urban Contemporary); HD3: ASU Radio (Old School R&B/Gospel)
- Affiliations: NPR, PRX

Ownership
- Owner: Alabama State University

History
- First air date: June 15, 1984
- Call sign meaning: Voice of Alabama State

Technical information
- Licensing authority: FCC
- Facility ID: 727
- Class: C1
- ERP: 80,000 watts
- HAAT: 106 meters (348 ft)
- Transmitter coordinates: 32.366°N 86.294°W

Links
- Public license information: Public file; LMS
- Webcast: Listen live Listen live (HD2); Listen live (HD3)
- Website: wvasfm.org

WVAS (90.7 FM) is a jazz-music formatted radio station in the Montgomery, Alabama, market licensed to the Alabama State University. WVAS is a member-supported non-commercial, educational station featuring news and other programming from National Public Radio and Public Radio Exchange. National programming produced by WVAS includes Café Jazz, distributed nationally by the African-American Public Radio Consortium.

WVAS began broadcasting on June 15, 1984, from the fifth floor of the Levi Watkins Learning Center. Two years later, the station moved to its current location at Thomas Kilby Hall. Broadcasting from its transmitter on campus, WVAS has a signal that spans 18 counties, reaching a total population of more than 651,000.

In September 2007, WVAS received a grant from the Corporation for Public Broadcasting to assist in its conversion from analog to digital broadcasting. WVAS was one of just two radio stations in Alabama to receive such a grant.

== See also ==
- List of jazz radio stations in the United States
