= Francis J. Pilecki =

Francis John Pilecki (August 4, 1934 – May 21, 1999) was an American administrator who was president of Westfield State College from 1978 until 1986, when he resigned amid sexual assault accusations. He then served as executive director of Leo House, a Catholic hotel in New York City, from 1987 to 1997.

== Early life ==
Pilecki was born on August 4, 1934 in Rochester, New York. He was a organist and choir director in the Catholic church from 1948 to 1975. He graduated from St. John Fisher College in 1955 and served in the United States Air Force from 1956 to 1960. On October 19, 1957, he married Juliana Helena Mueller. They had 6 children and later divorced.

== Career in education ==
From 1960 to 1964, Pilecki was a teacher at The Aquinas Institute of Rochester. In 1964, he earned his master's in education from the University of Rochester. Three years later, he earned his doctorate in education from the same institution.

From 1966 to 1968, Pilecki was the director of the Title III Program for the Bellefonte Area School District. From 1968 to 1971, he was an assistant professor at Boston University. After a two year stint as dean of Catherine Labouré Junior College, Pilecki became the dean of education and academic vice president at Fitchburg State College.

In 1978, Pilecki became president of Westfield State College. In December 1985, the mother of a Westfield State student alleged that her son had been sexually assaulted during a party at Pilecki's home two years prior. Pilecki was placed on sabbatical the following month and the school's board of regents agreed to pay the student $10,000 and give him three semesters of free tuition if he did not sue the board. In March, Pilecki announced his resignation effective August 31, and was given a $70,000 consulting contract with the school. During a legislative investigation into the payment, the Massachusetts Attorney General's office revealed that Pilecki had been the person accused of sexual assault. After knowledge of allegations became public, Pilecki sought treatment at McLean Hospital for depression. In June 1986, Pilecki was charged with four counts of indecent assault and battery on an adult. In January 1987, Pilecki was found not guilty on two counts of indecent assault and battery. Prosecutors planned on going ahead with a second trial involving another male student, however the charges were dropped three months later when Pilecki reached a civil settlement with that accuser.

In July 1987, Pilecki began undergoing treatment for colon cancer. That fall, he reclaimed a tenured teaching position at Fitchburg State, but was on sick leave until March 1989. He then requested an unpaid leave of absence and resigned the following month.

== Leo House ==
In 1987, Pilecki became the manager of Leo House, a Catholic church-affiliated 65-room hotel on West 23rd Street in Manhattan. In 1993, the hotel was involved in a legal dispute with long-term renters after it attempted to evict them from an annex that it wanted to close. In 1995, Pilecki, who was once again ill with cancer, brought on Paul Shanley, a priest he knew from his stay at McLean Hospital, to help him manage the hotel. After Pilecki resigned, Shanley sought to replace him, but Cardinal John O'Connor refused to give him the job due to prior allegations of child sexual assault.

== Later life ==
In 1998, Pilecki returned to Rochester to live with his sister. During this time, he was an organist at the St. Philip Neri Church in Rochester.

In March 1999, Pilecki pleaded guilty in Hillsborough County, New Hampshire to committing unnatural and lascivious acts with a minor. Although the case was 30-years old, New Hampshire's statute of limitations did not apply to suspects who lived and worked outside of the state. Although he pleaded guilty, Pilecki maintained his innocence, with his lawyer stating that Pilecki was sick and did not want to face the "rigors and expense of going to a trial". He received a six-month suspended sentence and two-years probation and was ordered to pay the accuser $7,500.

Pilecki died on May 21, 1999 at Wayne Memorial Hospital in Honesdale, Pennsylvania due to kidney failure.

Academic offices
Preceded by Robert L. Randolph	President of Westfield State College; 1978–1986	Succeeded by Irving H. Buchen
