= Ilunga Adell =

American actor (born 1948)

- Born: William Adell Stevenson; November 27, 1948 (age 77); Memphis, Tennessee, U.S.
- Occupations: Producer, screenwriter, actor
- Years active: 1970–present

Ilunga Adell (born William Adell Stevenson on November 27, 1948) is an American television and film producer, screenwriter, and actor who has written for many television series, primarily sitcoms, such as Sanford and Son, 227, A Different World, Married... with Children, Roc and Moesha. Ilunga also produced the teen-themed series City Guys, for which he also has written several episodes, the short-lived TV series Up and Coming, and My Brother and Me.
