= City Guys =

American television sitcom (1997–2001)

- Genre: Sitcom
- Created by: Peter Engel; Scott Spencer Gorden; (Note: Credited as "Scott S. Gorden" in opening titles)
- Directed by: Frank Bonner
- Starring: Wesley Jonathan; Scott Whyte; Caitlin Mowrey; Dion Basco; Marissa Dyan; Steven Daniel; Marcella Lowery
- Theme music composer: Joey Schwartz; Eric Swerdloff; Michael Muta-Ali Muhammad
- Opening theme: "Roll with the City Guys"
- Composer: Joey Schwartz
- Country of origin: United States
- Original language: English
- No. of seasons: 5
- No. of episodes: 105

Production
- Executive producer: Peter Engel
- Producer: Matthew B. Morgan
- Production locations: Sunset Gower Studios, Hollywood, California
- Camera setup: Multi-camera
- Running time: 30 minutes
- Production companies: Peter Engel Productions; NBC Enterprises; Tribune Entertainment (USA distribution only); MGM (International distribution only)

Original release
- Network: NBC
- Release: September 6, 1997 – December 15, 2001

City Guys is an American television sitcom that aired for five seasons on NBC from September 6, 1997 to December 15, 2001. The series aired as part of the network's Saturday morning block, TNBC and distributed by Tribune Entertainment.

== Premise ==
City Guys centered on two teenagers from different backgrounds who both attended Manhattan High School that became best friends. Jamal Grant came from a working-class family and Chris Anderson from a wealthy family. The boys and their friends dealt with the typical teen issues, such as cheating on tests, peer pressure, racism, and dealing with school violence.

== Cast ==
- Wesley Jonathan as Jamal Abdul Grant
- Scott Whyte as Christopher Robert "Chris" Anderson
- Caitlin Mowrey as Dawn Turnakof
- Dion Basco as Alberto ("Al") Rocket Ramos
- Marissa Dyan as Cassidy Giuliani
- Steven Daniel as Lionel "L-Train" Johnson
- Marcella Lowery as Principal Karen Coretta Noble

== Production ==
In September 1997, NBC announced City Guys would be a new series on the networks Saturday morning TNBC lineup. The series was described by John Miller, then NBC's executive VP of advertising, promotion and event programming, as having a more "urban feel" in comparison to other TNBC sitcoms air of middle America with California hipness. Like other TNBC shows, City Guys was given substantial review from an educational consultant to ensure there was educational or informative value per the FCC qualifiers.

== Episodes ==
=== Series overview ===
Season	Episodes	Originally released	
Season	Episodes	First released	Last released
1	14	September 6, 1997	December 6, 1997
2	14	September 12, 1998	December 12, 1998
3	25	September 11, 1999	June 10, 2000
4	26	September 23, 2000	February 24, 2001
5	26	September 8, 2001	December 15, 2001

=== Season 1 (1997) ===
No. overall	No. in season	Title	Directed by	Written by	Original release date
1	1	"New Kids"	Frank Bonner	Scott Spencer Gorden	September 6, 1997
Jamal Grant and Chris Anderson arrive at Manhattan High School. L-Train warns Jamal against painting over his graffiti. Chris learns about it and paints over it. In the end, they both get assigned to do a video yearbook for the school year.
2	2	"For the Love of Mother"	Frank Bonner	Ilunga Adell	September 13, 1997
When Chris' mom learns Manhattan High does not have a Music Department because of lack of money, she vows to throw a fundraiser at the Anderson home. This angers Chris, since she had already promised him that they would go to a concert on the same evening.
3	3	"Knicks Tickets"	Frank Bonner	Scott Spencer Gorden	September 20, 1997
Chris and Jamal are expected to tape Shakespeare in the Park, but they get Dawn to tape the play so they can go to the Knicks game.
4	4	"The Package"	Frank Bonner	Paul Corrigan & Brad Walsh	September 27, 1997
Alberto is delivering drugs for a drug dealer and doesn't know it. The boys devise a plan to blackmail the dealer into leaving Alberto alone.
5	5	"The Date"	Frank Bonner	Ilunga Adell	October 4, 1997
Chris asks Cassidy to the spring dance. She rejects him and Chris asks Jamal's sister, Kaisha, instead, causing friction between Jamal and Kaisha. L-Train goes to the dance with Cassidy.
6	6	"The Communication Gap"	Frank Bonner	Tom Tenowich	October 11, 1997
After getting into a fight with his father, Chris moves in with Jamal and his father. Chris soon realizes that not every father and son relationship is like his. Dawn and Cassidy ask Al if he has any "connections" on how to get tickets for an upcoming Jim Carrey movie.
7	7	"Red Ferrari"	Frank Bonner	Paul Corrigan & Brad Walsh	October 18, 1997
Jamal convinces Chris to have a party and drive his father's car after Chris reveals that his parents forgot his birthday.
8	8	"Rock the Vote"	Frank Bonner	Story by : Paul Corrigan & Brad Walsh; Teleplay by : Ilunga Adell & Tom Tenowich	October 25, 1997
Dawn and Cassidy both run for Student Council President with Jamal and Chris as their individual advisors. Dirty politics arise and L-Train decides to run at the last minute.
9	9	"The Movie"	Frank Bonner	Paul Corrigan & Brad Walsh	November 1, 1997
Jamal and Chris decide to make a movie using the school camera.
10	10	"Future Shock"	Frank Bonner	Kenneth Nowling	November 8, 1997
Jamal reconsiders the value of spending time studying after his new friend, Charlie, a straight-A Manhattan High student, is killed by a drunk driver. With the PSATs coming up in a few days, everyone tries to cope with the loss.
11	11	"Easy Money"	Frank Bonner	Barry Gurstein & David Pitlik	November 15, 1997
Chris uses Jamal's skills at guessing the results of games and gets them both into trouble.
12	12	"The College Girl"	Frank Bonner	Scott Spencer Gorden	November 22, 1997
Chris falls for an older woman, who he later discovers is his new student teacher.
13	13	"Bye, Mom"	Frank Bonner	Tom Tenowich	November 29, 1997
When Karen goes to the hospital, Jamal remembers his mother's death and how Karen reminds him so much of his mother.
14	14	"Old Friends"	Frank Bonner	Kenneth Nowling	December 6, 1997
One of Jamal's friends gets out of juvenile Hall and continues doing the things that led him to the hall in the first place. Meanwhile, Chris is trying to finish the video yearbook.

=== Season 2 (1998) ===
No. overall	No. in season	Title	Directed by	Written by	Original release date
15	1	"Men Behind Bars"	Frank Bonner	Paul Corrigan & Brad Walsh	September 12, 1998
Chris and Jamal end up in jail after getting caught with fake IDs. Al and L-Train come to bail the guys out and end up behind bars as well. Dawn and Cassidy offer their tutoring services at the school fundraising auction, but Vinnie and Rocco bid on the girls as dates.
16	2	"Shock Jock"	Frank Bonner	Scott Spencer Gorden	September 19, 1998
Chris and Jamal restart the school's old radio station. L-Train has a broken tooth but is afraid of going to the dentist.
17	3	"The Roommate"	Frank Bonner	Robert Illes & Ilunga Adell	September 26, 1998
L-Train has a fight with his mom and moves into Chris' Park Avenue penthouse. Al asks Cassidy and Dawn to be models for a photo shoot.
18	4	"Jamal Got His Gun"	Frank Bonner	Tom Tenowich	October 3, 1998
After being robbed at gunpoint one night, Jamal buys a gun.
19	5	"The Divorce"	Frank Bonner	Robert Illes	October 10, 1998
When Chris finds out that his parents are getting a divorce, he becomes a recluse and blames himself for their breakup.
20	6	"Bully, Bully"	Frank Bonner	Scott Spencer Gorden	October 17, 1998
L-Train reverts to his old ways of bullying people. Miss Noble forces him to think twice about his next schoolyard fight. Dawn is embarrassed after a terrible date with school quarterback Brent.
21	7	"Dance Fever"	Frank Bonner	Paul Corrigan & Brad Walsh	October 24, 1998
Jamal asks Cassidy if she can get her new boyfriend, 98 Degrees singer Nick Lachey, to perform with the rest of the group at an 'unofficial' school dance on the roof of Manhattan High.
22	8	"A Guy and a Goth"	Frank Bonner	Tom Tenowich	October 31, 1998
Chris feels unsure about dating a Goth girl. L-Train leads the gang in throwing a surprise party for Miss Noble's tenth anniversary at Manny High.
23	9	"Big Brothers"	Frank Bonner	Ilunga Adell	November 7, 1998
Miss Noble asks Jamal and Chris to become big brothers as part of a class project. But their little brother, Ernesto, turns out to be a handful of trouble. Cassidy tries to pass Driver's Education.
24	10	"Over the Speed Limit"	Frank Bonner	Robert Illes & Ilunga Adell	November 14, 1998
Cassidy starts taking pills when she is overworked.
25	11	"A Noble Profession"	Frank Bonner	Paul Corrigan & Brad Walsh	November 21, 1998
Ms. Noble quits after the students take her for granted one too many times. She returns when her replacement gets out of control.
26	12	"Party of Three"	Frank Bonner	Paul Ciancarelli & David DiPietro	November 28, 1998
During his radio show, Jamal advises an anonymous caller to drop her current boyfriend for the guy she has a crush on, but doesn't realize that Al is the caller's boyfriend. L-Train sees Dawn's comet viewing party as an opportunity to signal aliens.
27	13	"Saving Private Johnson"	Frank Bonner	Brett Dewey	December 5, 1998
L-Train decides to drop out and join the Marines. He fails the Marines' admission test, until someone discovers that he may have dyslexia.
28	14	"A Gift of Friendship"	Frank Bonner	Tom Tenowich	December 12, 1998
The gang help Al and his family during the holidays after Al's father loses his job.

=== Season 3 (1999–2000) ===
No. overall	No. in season	Title	Directed by	Written by	Original release date
29	1	"Greece Is the Word"	Frank Bonner	Tom Tenowich	September 4, 1999
Chris finds himself in the middle of a love triangle. Al and L-Train pull pranks on unsuspecting freshmen.
30	2	"Mr. Baseball"	Frank Bonner	Robert Illes	September 11, 1999
Jamal lets being the hero of a baseball game go to his head. When he fails to lead the team to victory, he wants to quit the team.
31	3	"Alley Oops"	Frank Bonner	Scott Spencer Gorden	September 18, 1999
Chris, Jamal, Al and Dawn prepare to face their bowling league rivals in a tournament, but the guys consider dropping Dawn so they have a better chance of winning. Ms. Noble develops a crush on the new substitute teacher, Mr. Washington.
32	4	"Face the Music"	Frank Bonner	Ilunga Adell	September 25, 1999
El-Train sings the blues when his musical hero Slick Willy Bill steals a song he wrote. Al publishes unflattering photos of Cassidy and Dawn on the cover of his magazine.
33	5	"The Players"	Frank Bonner	Paul Corrigan & Brad Walsh	October 2, 1999
After seeing Cassidy perform in a student film, Jamal and Chris decide to make their own movie and enter it in a film festival. Dawn, Al and El-Train volunteer for a psychology experiment and Dawn becomes frustrated when she can't do as well as the two guys.
34	6	"Raise the Roofies"	Frank Bonner	Leslie Eberhard	October 2, 1999
Cassidy is almost tricked into drinking a date rape drug by a college guy, but Chris and Jamal find her in time.
35	7	"Ebony & Ivory"	Frank Bonner	Story by : Tom Tenowich; Teleplay by : Paul Ciancarelli & David DiPietro	October 9, 1999
Jamal dates the deputy mayor's daughter, who tells her racist father that she is going out with Chris.
36	8	"Reluctant Hero"	Frank Bonner	Story by : Tom Tenowich; Teleplay by : Paul Ciancarelli & David DiPietro	October 9, 1999
It's "Crime Prevention Week" at Manny High and the students are given self-defense classes. Jamal uses his newly developed skills to stop a mugging, but makes Chris take the credit, and reap the rewards, because he was supposed to be home grounded at the time. Al, El-Train, Cassidy and Dawn are enlisted to patrol the halls as "Manny Monitors."
37	9	"In this Corner"	Frank Bonner	Ilunga Adell	October 16, 1999
Jamal decides to become a boxer and compete in a local tournament, even though his father warns him not to.
38	10	"El-Trainmania IV"	Frank Bonner	Todd J. Greenwald	October 16, 1999
El-Train is offered the opportunity to work as a professional wrestler. Jamal and Chris start accepting bribes from local merchants in exchange for endorsements on the school radio station.
39	11	"Marriage Go Round"	Frank Bonner	Story by : Paul Corrigan & Brad Walsh; Teleplay by : Robert Illes & Ilunga Adell	October 23, 1999
Jamal is jealous that Ranya is spending too much time with Chris after the two are paired up in Ms. Noble's marriage project. Jamal's partner is having to do the project alone and El-Train is getting bossed around by his partner, Tasha.
40	12	"Movin' on Up"	Frank Bonner	David DiPietro & Paul Ciancarelli	October 30, 1999
The gang from Manny High move in together as part of a reality TV show. Miss Noble is frustrated when she is forced to work with an incompetent assistant who also happens to be her boss's daughter.
41	13	"Down and Out in Soho"	Frank Bonner	Scott Spencer Gorden	October 30, 1999
Dawn gets the group involved with helping foreigners adjust to life in America. One of the foreigners decides to take advantage of his new friends and steal from them. El-Train and Chris have to figure out how to tell Cassidy that she can't sing.
42	14	"When Al Met Dawn"	Frank Bonner	Scott Spencer Gorden	November 6, 1999
Al and Dawn try to keep their new relationship a secret because of the Reality House cameras. However things get complicated when L-Train arranges a double date for Al and himself.
43	15	"Funny Business"	Frank Bonner	Ilunga Adell & Tom Tenowich	November 6, 1999
An architectural company invites students to take part for an internship which, Jamal, Chris and Dawn are volunteered, but soon their boss Rebecca starts making seductive advances toward Chris and gives him a bad grade when he refuses her.
44	16	"Get Your Vote On"	Frank Bonner	Kurt Taylor	November 13, 1999
El-Train challenges Jamal by running against him in the school elections.
45	17	"Angels of Harlem"	Frank Bonner	David DiPietro & Paul Ciancarelli	November 20, 1999
Ms. Noble's church is going to be torn down by Chris's dad's construction company, in order to build a mall. The gang creates a radio-a-thon to raise money to save the church. After this fails, Chris and Dawn chain themselves to the church. Chris's dad decides to build the mall around the church.
46	18	"Rollin' With the Homies"	Frank Bonner	Paul Corrigan & Brad Walsh	November 20, 1999
The gang start working at a toy store and the owner wants Jamal and Chris to be friends with his son, Tommy, who is in a wheelchair.
47	19	"El-Train in the Sky with Geena"	Frank Bonner	Todd J. Greenwald	November 27, 1999
El-Train's girlfriend steals from people to continue her drug habit.
48	20	"Miracle on 134th Street and Lexington Avenue"	Frank Bonner	Ilunga Adell	November 27, 1999
While working at the New York Toy Company for the Christmas holiday, Dawn and Chris meet Alison, a girl from a broken family. They find her father and convince him to come back to spend some time with Alison and her mother.
49	21	"Yoko Oh-No"	Frank Bonner	Paul Corrigan & Brad Walsh	December 3, 1999
Jamal is getting too close to his new girlfriend and does whatever she wants to do.
50	22	"Party Like It's 1999"	Frank Bonner	Scott Spencer Gorden	December 3, 1999
In this clip show episode, the gang from Manhattan High prepares to celebrate New Year's Eve in Times Square. When they find out it has been closed off because of too many people, Chris and Al convince Dawn to let them into the school so they can watch from the roof.
51	23	"Fast Time at Manny High"	Frank Bonner	David DiPietro & Paul Ciancarelli	February 12, 2000
Manny High is entered in a charity event. If the kids fast for one night, the Keeny company will donate $500 to feed the homeless and $500 to Manny High. Everybody agrees to try the fast, but their commitment doesn't last long.
52	24	"Harlem Honey"	Frank Bonner	Paul Ciancarelli & David DiPietro	March 11, 2000
Jamal creates an internet girlfriend for his father. The problems start when his father wants to meet her. Jamal convinces Ms. Noble to pretend to be "Harlem Honey."
53	25	"Mom on the Rocks"	Frank Bonner	Story by : Ilunga Adell; Teleplay by : Robert Illes & Scott Spencer Gorden	June 10, 2000
Dawn is embarrassed by her mom's drinking problem.

=== Season 4 (2000–01) ===
No. overall	No. in season	Title	Directed by	Written by	Original release date
54	1	"Kickin' It"	Frank Bonner	James Dutcher	September 23, 2000
When Al gets special treatment because he is a star athlete, Dawn tries to tell him he still needs to do his homework. Cassidy and the rest of the gang help get Ms. Noble in shape for her class reunion. Ms. Noble meets a very special friend from high school.
55	2	"The Users"	Frank Bonner	Todd J. Greenwald	September 23, 2000
Chris and Jamal are in need of tutoring for midterms, and find an unlikely study buddy in the irritating studio technician Jasper. Al, El-Train, Cassidy and Dawn plot to get Ms. Noble and her boyfriend Billy back together again.
56	3	"Cheat Happens"	Frank Bonner	David DiPietro & Paul Ciancarelli	September 30, 2000
When Jamal and Chris are faced with the prospect of summer school, they decide to make cheat sheets. Dawn and Cassidy decide that if the guys can have their own radio show, then the girls can too.
57	4	"Presumed Innocent"	Frank Bonner	Ilunga Adell	September 30, 2000
Tempers flare between Jamal and a gang banger classmate until they decide to settle their differences in student court. Al and El-Train face the challenge of auditioning as slang-free radio deejays.
58	5	"The Third Wheel"	Frank Bonner	Scott Spencer Gorden	October 7, 2000
While Dawn and Al seek some time together, El-Train seems to spoil every opportunity for them to be alone. Chris, Jamal, Ms. Noble and Cassidy create a horror radio play.
59	6	"Students of the Bride"	Frank Bonner	Story by : Paul Corrigan & Brad Walsh; Teleplay by : Ilunga Adell & Todd J. Greenwald	October 7, 2000
Ms. Noble is getting married. Jamal and Cassidy develop feelings for each other as the wedding is being planned.
60	7	"Mo' Money, Mo' Problems"	Frank Bonner	Paul Corrigan & Brad Walsh	October 14, 2000
El-Train comes up with an idea for a glow in the dark basketball. El-Train, Al, Chris, and Jamal decide to go into business together after El-Train's invention turns out to be lucrative. Cassidy becomes jealous after Dawn gets the part in a famous director's movie.
61	8	"Kodak Moment"	Frank Bonner	Todd J. Greenwald	October 14, 2000
Chris gets involved with Sarah, an international star and soon realizes her life is harder than he thinks. Jamal helps Cassidy and Dawn with their project on the rumored ghosts of Manny High.
62	9	"Meet Mr. History"	Frank Bonner	Story by : Todd J. Greenwald; Teleplay by : Paul Corrigan & Brad Walsh	October 21, 2000
Chris and Jamal are assigned to write a paper about someone who has witnessed an important historical event, but when they can't find anyone to interview, they make one up. Dawn and Cassidy decide to go into business selling the fruit tarts they created in home economics class.
63	10	"Keep on the Download"	Frank Bonner	Story by : David DiPietro & Paul Ciancarelli; Teleplay by : Scott Spencer Gorden	October 21, 2000
No one is laughing when Chris and Jamal's rivalry with the deejays from another school escalates from spirited pranks to costly property damages. Manny High's Quiz Team captain Dawn is obsessed with winning the city finals trophy.
64	11	"Havoc"	Frank Bonner	Story by : Paul Corrigan & Brad Walsh; Teleplay by : Ilunga Adell & Todd J. Greenwald	October 28, 2000
Chris quits the jazz group to play with a popular band that just lost its guitar player. Cassidy and Dawn try to learn more about El-Train's troll doll.
65	12	"Makin' Up Is Hard to Do"	Frank Bonner	Story by : David DiPietro & Paul Ciancarelli; Teleplay by : Ilunga Adell & Scott Spencer Gorden	October 28, 2000
Jamal battles Malcolm in a dance contest during the school dance. Al and Dawn break up after arguing.
66	13	"Living in America"	Frank Bonner	Scott Spencer Gorden	November 4, 2000
In this clip show, the gang once again reflects on events from the past year.
67	14	"Shock Treatment"	Frank Bonner	Barry "Berry" Douglas	November 4, 2000
Chris and Jamal are offered the chance to fill in for a famous shock jock. Cassidy, Dawn, Al and El-Train try out for cheerleading.
68	15	"Frisky Business"	Frank Bonner	Todd J. Greenwald	November 11, 2000
The students go on strike when the school board installs new security measures. Dawn and Cassidy's friendship is tested when they promise to be honest with each other, no matter what.
69	16	"Jamal X"	Frank Bonner	Al Sonja L. Rice	November 11, 2000
Jamal's uncle comes to the school to speak to his class and sparks something in Jamal to be more active in African-American affairs. He starts a club for the Black students and excludes Chris from joining.
70	17	"Subway Confessions"	Frank Bonner	David DiPietro & Paul Ciancarelli	November 18, 2000
Ms. Noble has to figure out the truth as the gang must account for their whereabouts after sneaking into school. The stories all occur on subway train and range from a clown giving birth, Al and El-Train battling Russian spies, and an emergency makeover of a homeless woman.
71	18	"Who Da Man"	Frank Bonner	Al Sonja L. Rice	November 18, 2000
Dawn saves Al and Cassidy from robbers on the train and the school newspaper soon learns of her heroic actions.
72	19	"Get to Preppin'"	Frank Bonner	Bernie Ancheta	November 25, 2000
Everyone is obsessed with making the grade during midterms at Manny High. Al (Dion Basco) and El-Train sell the school basketball trophy from 1957 on an internet auction.
73	20	"Unhappy Hour"	Frank Bonner	David DiPietro & Paul Ciancarelli	December 2, 2000
The gang are invited to appear on a teen show to talk about their friendship. The night before the show they all get drunk and fight with each other.
74	21	"Compromising Principal"	Frank Bonner	Bernie Ancheta	December 2, 2000
When Ms. Noble decides to loosen up and be more cool in order to win a most popular principal contest, the school turns into an undisciplined zoo. In the midst of the chaos, the gang try their hand at after school elective classes.
75	22	"Dating Games"	Frank Bonner	Todd J. Greenwald	December 9, 2000
Love is in the air at Manny High as the gang prepares for the Valentine Dance. Cassidy realizes that she has feelings for Chris. Jamal, El-Train, Al and Dawn participate in Ms. Noble's meditation class.
76	23	"Wager Money Go"	Frank Bonner	Barry "Berry" Douglas	December 9, 2000
Jamal develops a gambling addiction that strains his friendship with Chris, Al and El-Train.
77	24	"El-Brain"	Frank Bonner	Paul F. Ciancarelli & David S. DiPietro	December 16, 2000
El-Train enters the Science Fair to prove that he's smarter than everyone, including Jamal, who thinks he isn't.
78	25	"Pier Pressure"	Frank Bonner	Bernie Ancheta	December 16, 2000
The gang's holiday weekend at the Andersons' place in the Hamptons goes adrift when Chris, Cassidy, Dawn and Al run out of gas while yachting. Meanwhile, on shore, Jamal and El-Train's attempts to meet girls are interrupted by an unexpected visit from Ms. Noble and Billy.
79	26	"Blast from the Past"	Frank Bonner	Al Sonja L. Rice	February 24, 2001
Chris tries to make surprise anniversary dinner plans for Cassidy, but his sneaking around leads her to think he's cheating on her. Dawn and Al challenge Ms. Noble and Billy to a "Best Couple" contest.

=== Season 5 (2001) ===
No. overall	No. in season	Title	Directed by	Written by	Original release date
80	1	"This Old Nerd"	Frank Bonner	Jay J. Demopoulos	September 8, 2001
Jamal attempts to change his nerdy friend's image. El-Train unwittingly buys Ms. Noble a stolen watch for her birthday.
81	2	"E-Breakup"	Frank Bonner	Al Sonja L. Rice	September 8, 2001
By spending all her time designing the Manny High School website, Dawn becomes distant from Al and that puts a strain on their relationship. Jamal feels lonely, so he spends all his time interrupting Chris and Cassidy when they want to be alone together.
82	3	"Chicken Run"	Frank Bonner	Scott Spencer Gorden	September 22, 2001
Jamal fights a gang member. The gang member pulls out a knife and stabs Chris, who was trying to save Jamal.
83	4	"Papa Please"	Frank Bonner	David DiPietro & Paul Ciancarelli	September 22, 2001
Chris meets Cassidy's father for the first time. Dawn vows with the help of Al to rid Ms. Noble of her addictive smoking habit.
84	5	"Red Dawn"	Frank Bonner	Todd J. Greenwald	September 29, 2001
Dawn has trouble accepting that Al has started dating a new girl so soon after their break up. Chris, Jamal and El-Train hold a Survivor-style competition in the park, with Noble overseeing.
85	6	"Dances with Malcolm"	Frank Bonner	Bernie Ancheta	September 29, 2001
Jamal teams up with Malcolm, his dance nemesis to audition as backup dancers. Dawn and Cassidy ask Al and El-Train to secretly take over their advice column for women.
86	7	"Just for the Record"	Frank Bonner	Jeffrey J. Sachs	October 6, 2001
The gang gets involved with a music group trying to make it big.
87	8	"Skips, Lies and Radiotapes"	Frank Bonner	Jesse Collins	October 6, 2001
Jamal and Chris want to spend senior ditch day bungee jumping with Cassidy, Al, and El-Train, but Ms. Noble tells them they have to have a radio telethon to raise money for children. Dawn fights against a student named Kitty Collins for the attention of Ms. Noble and the title of valedictorian.
88	9	"Dawn Don't Know Jack"	Frank Bonner	David DiPietro & Paul Ciancarelli	October 13, 2001
Dawn falls for Chris's old friend, Jack. El-Train, Al, and Jamal get robbed on their way to a DMX concert.
89	10	"Rosie O'Diner"	Frank Bonner	Todd J. Greenwald & Al Sonja L. Rice	October 13, 2001
Jamal starts dating a waitress named Rosie. When Rosie's comments offend customers, Mr. Grant tells Jamal to fire her.
90	11	"Cassidy Couch"	Frank Bonner	Todd J. Greenwald & Jeffrey J. Sachs	October 20, 2001
Cassidy gets the lead role in a play with a prominent Broadway director, who then sexually harasses her. After El-Train falls out of bed and hits his head, he believes he has premonitions of the future and predicts that Death will be visiting Ms. Noble.
91	12	"Brother from Another Mother"	Frank Bonner	Jeffrey Sachs & Todd J. Greenwald	October 20, 2001
During a heat wave, Al and Chris secretly set up a large swimming pool on the roof of Manny High. Jamal's father and El-Train's mother develop an attraction for each other while attending a parent-principal conference.
92	13	"Weight on Jamal"	Frank Bonner	Todd J. Greenwald	October 27, 2001
Jamal wants to get into USC, but his coach tells him that he isn't in shape enough to be considered for the team. He starts working out and is offered steroids at the health club. Meanwhile Dawn, Cassidy, Chris and Al have to deal with a cruel pottery teacher.
93	14	"Basket Case"	Frank Bonner	Story by : David DiPietro & Paul Ciancarelli; Teleplay by : Jeffrey J. Sachs & Bernie Ancheta	October 27, 2001
El-Train believes that participating in sports competition against his new girlfriend, Kianna will harm their relationship. Jamal, Chris, and Cassidy work to appease a newspaper food critic who has given a bad review to the Manhattan Diner. Dawn develops a crush on the head of the rec center.
94	15	"An SAT Carol"	Frank Bonner	Josh Goldstein	November 3, 2001
Overwhelmed by all the test prep, El-Train decides not to take the SATs.
95	16	"Mock the Vote"	Frank Bonner	Jeffrey J. Sachs	November 3, 2001
The new student body president cancels Jamal and Chris' radio show by canceling it. Cassidy deals with a potential stalker.
96	17	"Prose and Cons"	Frank Bonner	Al Sonja L. Rice	November 3, 2001
El-Train becomes popular for his poetry, which causes him to pay less attention to Kianna. Al, Chris, and Jamal attempt be the first students to prank Ms. Noble during her tenure as Principal.
97	18	"Why Y'all Clippin'"	Frank Bonner	Paul Ciancarelli & David DiPietro	November 10, 2001
In this clip show, the whole gang is having problems over a yearbook picture and are giving each other the silent treatment. So Ms. Noble calls everybody to Manny High on Saturday to work things out.
98	19	"Model Behavior"	Frank Bonner	Bernie Ancheta	November 17, 2001
Jamal's girlfriend, Rosie, signs up and gets featured in a magazine. Jamal is having problems with guys ogling his girlfriend.
99	20	"Almost Fatal"	Frank Bonner	Paul Ciancarelli & David DiPietro	November 17, 2001
After Chris, Jamal, and El-Train survive a car crash, they begin live to their lives on the edge.
100	21	"Anchors Away"	Frank Bonner	Al Sonja L. Rice & Todd J. Greenwald	November 24, 2001
The time for Ms. Noble's retirement and the gang's graduation is drawing near and everybody is excited, except for Dawn. She becomes anxious about moving on from Manny High and the thought of being apart from her friends when they all go their separate ways in the fall.
101	22	"Video Killed the Radio Star"	Frank Bonner	Bernie Ancheta	November 24, 2001
Dawn, Cassidy, El-Train, and Al produce a television show for Manny High, the success of which makes Jamal and Chris jealous.
102	23	"Prom-Lems"	Frank Bonner	Jeffrey J. Sachs	December 1, 2001
The gang all prepare for and attend the Manny High Prom.
103	24	"Goodbye Manny High"	Frank Bonner	Scott Spencer Gorden	December 8, 2001
The gang are sent the wrong diplomas. El-Train performs in a play in order to earn enough credits to graduate. Chris and Jamal end their radio show.
104	25	"And Then There Were None"	Frank Bonner	Todd J. Greenwald	December 8, 2001
In the show's final clip show episode, Ms. Noble and the gang have a final farewell meal at the Manhattan diner. They fondly look back at the memories of the good times, as each member of the gang says their goodbyes.
105	26	"Al's in Toyland"	Frank Bonner	Al Sonja L. Rice	December 15, 2001
At his new job, Al attempts to advertise a toy gun without violence and gore. Ms. Noble has signed up Chris, Jamal, El-Train, Dawn, and Cassidy to the Manny High marching band against their will to fulfill their Arts elective credit for graduation.

== Syndication ==
City Guys ran in syndication on local television stations throughout the United States from September 10, 2001 to September 13, 2002. Tribune Entertainment, which distributed the series (its corporate sister at the time, Tribune Broadcasting, incidentally, was the primary station group carrying the series), sold the series as a syndication package–alongside fellow TNBC sitcom California Dreams–for stations to count towards educational programming guidelines set by the Federal Communications Commission. Reruns of the series briefly aired on BET from October 2, 2010 to October 16, 2010.

As of 2022, City Guys–as well as fellow TNBC sitcom One World–were available for streaming on Tubi, but by June 2023, this show was removed from Tubi, though One World still is available to watch as well. It is also not available to stream on Peacock.

International distribution rights to the series are owned by MGM Television.
