= Robert L. Randolph =

Robert Lee Randolph (January 2, 1926 – April 11, 2003) was an American academic administrator who served as president of Westfield State College and Alabama State University.

== Early life ==
Randolph was born on January 2, 1926, in East St. Louis, Illinois. His father was a Methodist minister and his family lived in near poverty. He graduated from East St. Louis Lincoln High School. In 1943, he was chosen for officer training in the United States Navy. He attended the V-12 Navy College Training Program at DePauw University and was commissioned at the age of 19. He served for two years and resumed his education at DePauw following his discharge. After receiving his bachelor's degree in economics from DePauw, he earned masters and Ph.D. degrees from the University of Illinois.

== Career ==
From 1958 to 1965, Randolph worked at Springfield College. He rose from instructor to associate professor and was department chair from 1960 to 1963. From 1960 to 1964, he was also the college's director of evening and summer schools. Randolph worked in the federal government the Presidency of Lyndon B. Johnson. From 1965 to 1967, he was the deputy associate director of Job Corps. He then served as a senior compliance officer for the Equal Employment Opportunity Commission. In 1969, Randolph became the executive vice president of Chicago State University.

On May 10, 1973, Randolph was named president of Westfield State College in Westfield, Massachusetts. He was the first African-American to serve as president of a Massachusetts state college and the fourth in the nation to head a predominately white college. In April 1978, he received an 88–12 no confidence vote from the school's faculty. Later that year, he was reassigned to the position of vice chancellor for special affairs in the Massachusetts state college system.

In 1981, Randolph was named president of Alabama State University. He resigned for personal reasons in 1983. That fall, he became a professor of economics at the University of Montevallo. His final job in education was at the State Community College of East Saint Louis, where he was interim president from 1993 to 1995.

== Later life ==
Randolph retired to Harwich, Massachusetts, where he had a vacation home for many years. He worked for the Housing Assistance Corporation in Hyannis, Massachusetts and was a member of the Cape Cod Commission. He died on April 11, 2003, at Cape Cod Hospital after a long illness.

Academic offices
| Preceded by Leonard J. Savignano | President of Westfield State College; 1973–1978 | Succeeded by Francis J. Pilecki |
| Preceded by Levi Watkins Sr. | President of Alabama State University; 1981–1983 | Succeeded by Leon Howard |
