= Drum major (military) =

Military Appointment

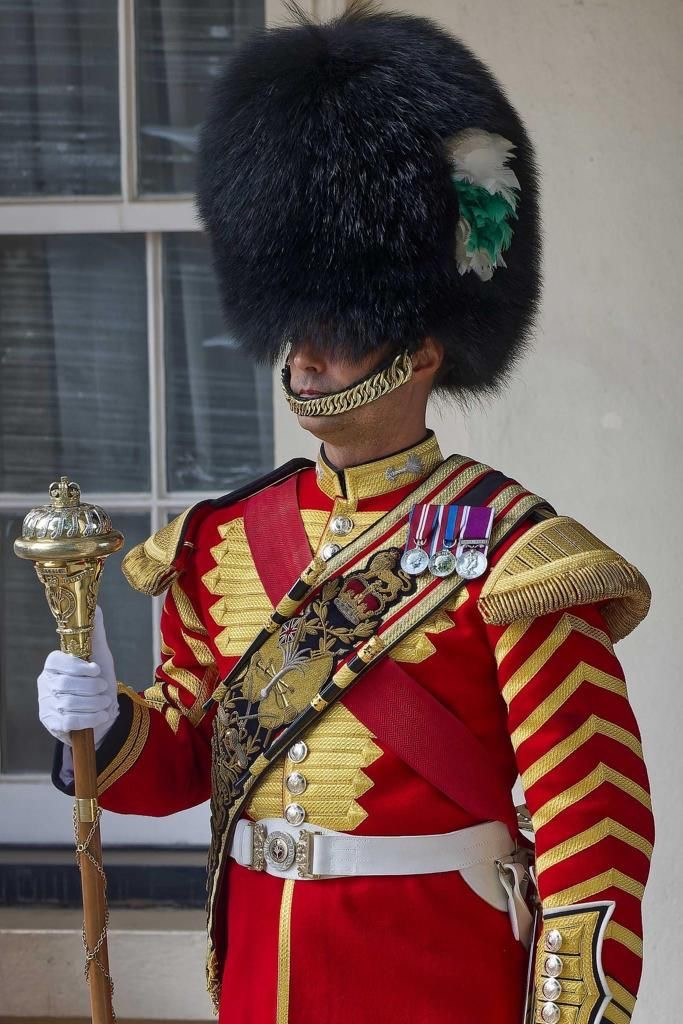
A British Army drum major in 2023

A drum major in the military is the individual leading a military band or a field unit (corps of drums, fanfare band, pipe band or drum and bugle corps). It is generally an appointment, not a military rank. Military drum majors utilize a ceremonial mace for giving commands while marching. Many drum majors, particularly American- or British-influenced ones, wear a sash that can carry embroidered badges of their home unit and battle honors; a pair of ceremonial drum sticks are often attached.

== By country ==
=== Australia ===
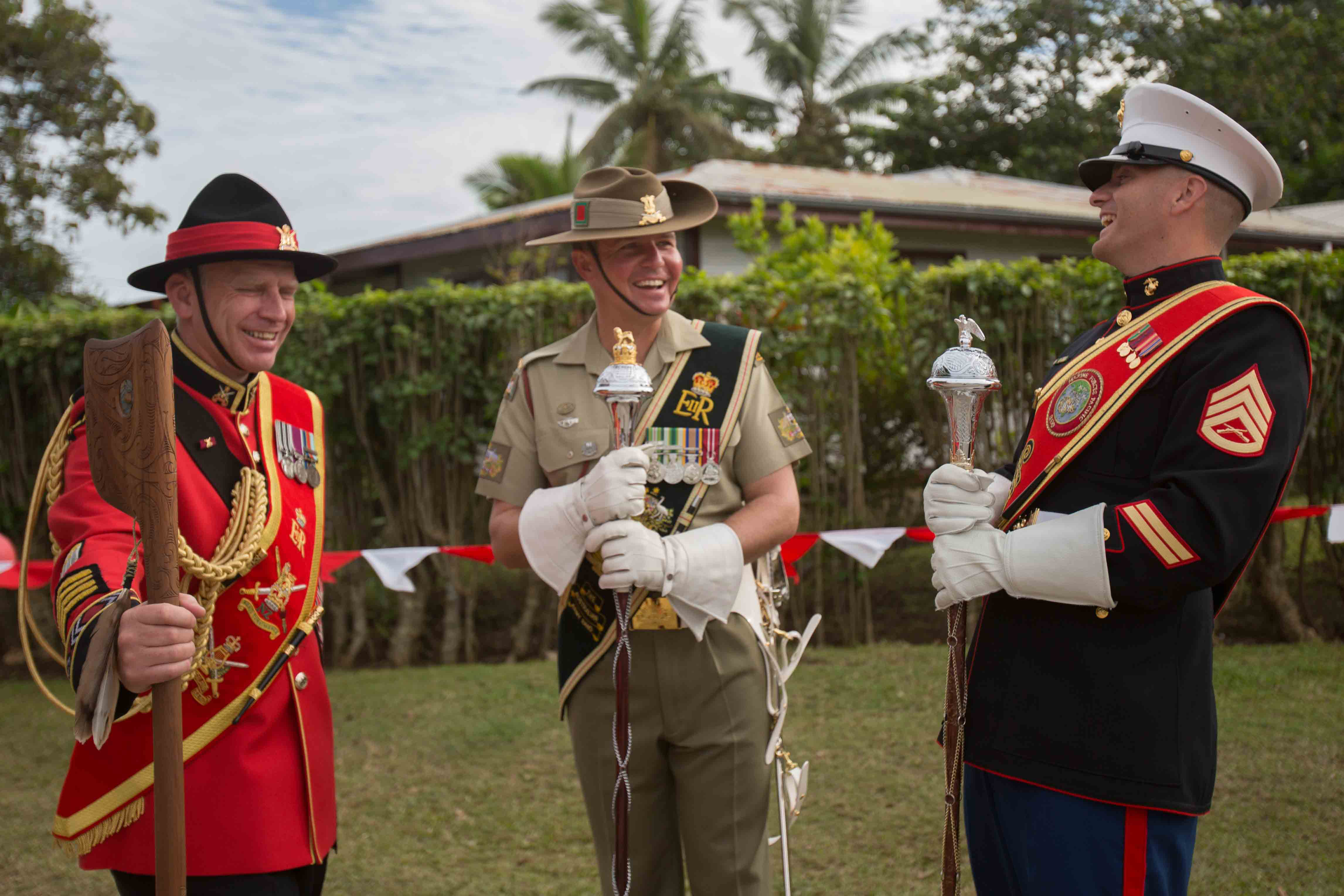
Drum majors of (left to right) the New Zealand Army, Australian Army and United States Marine Corps

The Australian Army traditionally styles the appointments along the same lines as the British Army. The drum major is usually an experienced member of the Australian Army Band Corps, although drum majors in regimental pipes and drums are typically members of the Royal Australian Infantry Corps. Drum majors generally have the rank of a senior NCO. However, capability is the main qualification for appointment: the most senior or highest-ranked member of the unit is not always the drum major.

=== Canada ===
The Canadian Armed Forces do not require the drum major to be a drummer. Being a former British dominion, a lot of the Canadian drum major tradition is inspired by the British Army. It is also influenced by French and American army music traditions and is an essential part the Canadian Forces drum major drill.

=== China ===
Drum majors in the People's Liberation Army and affiliated military bands use a mix of techniques that are of American, German and Russian influence. Most drum majors carry a mace consisting of a gold staff with a red chain connected to a red ferrule at the bottom wrapped around it, along with a red fringe with a five-pointed star above it at the top. This baton is used similarly to that in the Russian or German military, where the drum major swings the baton up and down vertically to the beat of the music.

The military band of the People's Liberation Army Ground Force uses an American-influenced mace and also executes American-style marching techniques, with the exception being the absence of a ceremonial sash which is worn across the stomach. All band members wear a modified version of the full dress uniform usually worn by the guard of honour; the only difference is the type of shoes they wear. Prior to the introduction of this uniform, the band wore the full-dress uniform worn by general officers.

=== Indonesia ===
Indonesian drum majors have a tradition that is a mix of Dutch, American, and British influences. Drum majors in the Indonesian National Armed Forces and Indonesian National Police are also not required to be drummers. In the military and police academies, where the drum majors change yearly, the only requirement is that they are cadet sergeant majors or cadet staff sergeant majors. In civil and police bands, there are one to six drum majors that serve alongside the director of music. The military and police drum majors wear full dress or service uniforms at the head of their formations in parades and wear the peaked cap.

=== Russia ===
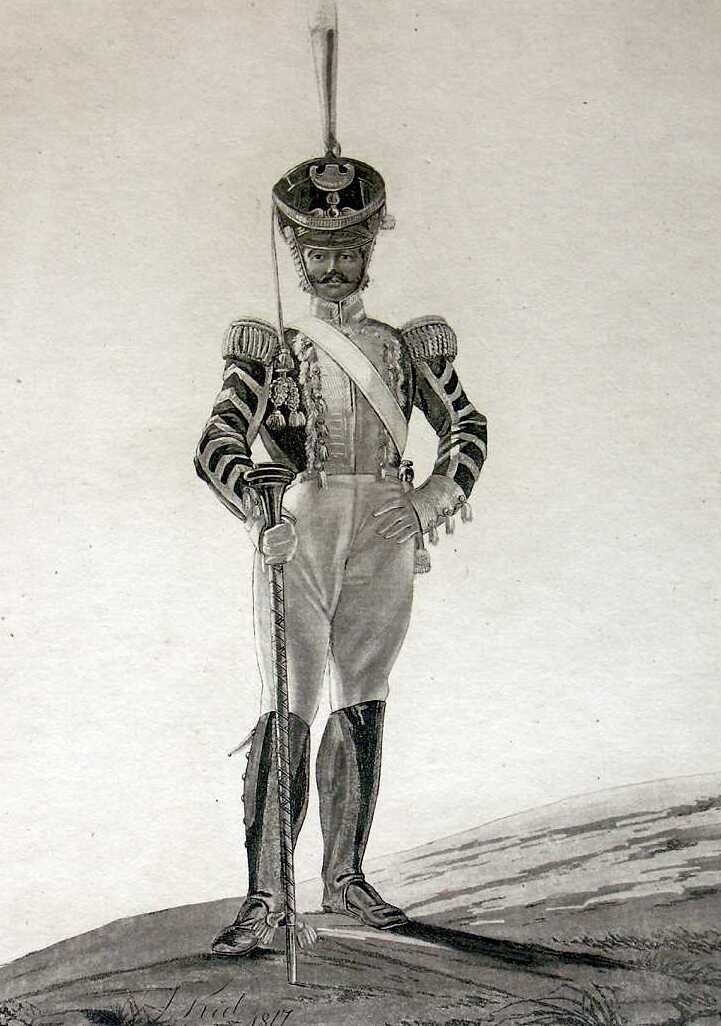
An Imperial Russian Army drum major

In the Russian Armed Forces, drum majors (Russian: Тамбурмажор) are commissioned officers, since they also serve as band leaders and conductors. They are not required to be drummers, but must have long experience as a military bandsman. The title was introduced in 1815 by the Imperial Russian Army. The uniform consisted of gold/silver galloons and a pair of epaulettes. The title was abolished in 1865 only for army regiments and would be reintroduced for the Red Army in 1918. The position would be toned down until after World War II, when they gained more significance. The Soviet Armed Forces made sure that the Soviet (and later Russian) model for drum majors could be differentiated with the Western version. The Russian model has been used in almost all former Soviet republics (the Baltics, Georgia and Ukraine being the exception).

All Russian drum majors are trained in military music schools and institutes like the Moscow Military Music College and the College of Military Music and the Institute of Military Band Conductors of the Military University of the Ministry of Defence, who graduate from these with the rank of lieutenant and during parades carry maces with either the service or full dress uniform.

=== United Kingdom ===
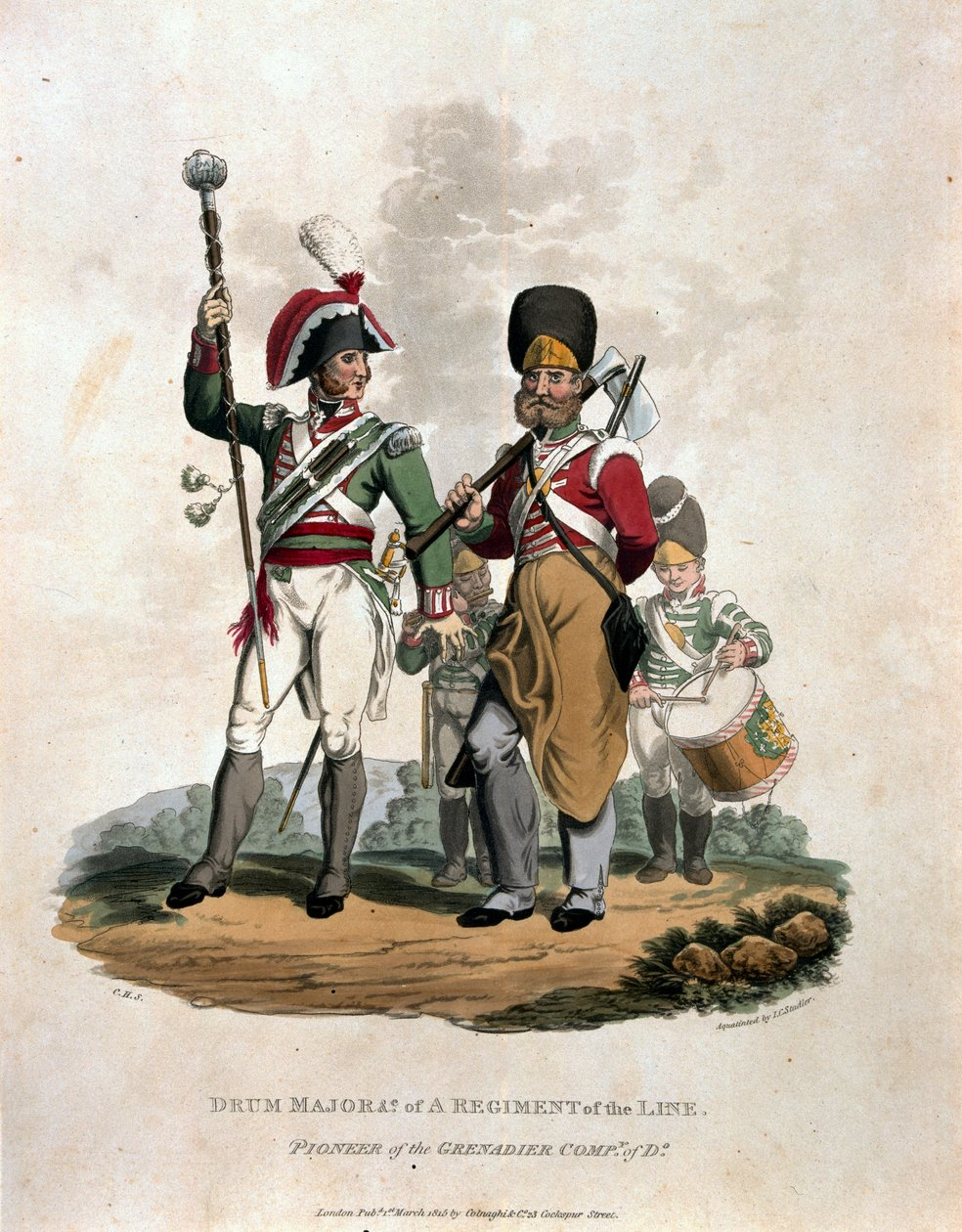
1815 engraving of a British Army drum major (left)

In the British Army and Royal Marines Band Service, a drum major holds the rank of sergeant, staff sergeant / colour sergeant, or warrant officer class 2. The Corps Drum Major Royal Marines and the Senior Drum Major Army hold the rank of warrant officer class 1. Royal Marines drum majors are now always drawn from the buglers branch and always started their careers as a side drummer (titled "bugler" in the Royal Marines, as RM drummers are taught to play the bugle and herald trumpets as well as the drums) and are required to have passed a number of courses in music, military skills, and leadership throughout their military careers before being considered for an appointment as a drum major. Drum majors in Army regimental corps of drums are always drummers, but drum majors in the Royal Corps of Army Music are not required to be, the appointment being held by any suitably qualified musician (including a drummer). Royal Air Force drum majors hold the rank of sergeant, chief technician, or flight sergeant (with the Senior Drum Major RAF being a warrant officer), and are not required to be drummers.

The insignia of appointment is four large point-up chevrons worn on the uniform sleeve, or four point-up chevrons worn on a wrist-strap whilst in shirt-sleeve order, surmounted by a drum. In the British Army, staff sergeants/colour sergeants have a small crown above the drum, whilst warrant officers class 2 have a larger crown and warrant officers class 1 wear the royal arms as usual. Since the drum major is part of the battalion staff, he wears a crimson sash instead of scarlet, and dresses as a warrant officer regardless of his rank. He is always referred to and addressed as "Drum Major" or "Sir" and not by his rank. In the RAF, a chief technician wears a four-bladed propeller above the drum, a flight sergeant wears a crown, and a warrant officer wears the royal arms. Royal Marines drum majors do not wear any additional badges to indicate specific rank.

=== United States ===
Drum majors were first introduced when the North American continent was colonized in the 17th century, with drum majors being the standard in fife and drum corps by 1775. The United States Armed Forces does not require the drum major to be a drummer; however, they must have a knowledge of music and have the ability to teach all aspects of drill and ceremony. The appointment of drum major falls to senior level NCOs with the rank of staff sergeant onwards. Drum majors in the military's premier ensembles wear bearskin hats when on parade.

=== Venezuela ===
The duty of drum major within the National Bolivarian Armed Forces of Venezuela is only present in the corps of drums of military formations and not in military bands. The drum major wears depending on occasion full dress, service dress or combat dress uniforms, with active units usually having their corps of drums' drum majors wearing the latter.

== History ==
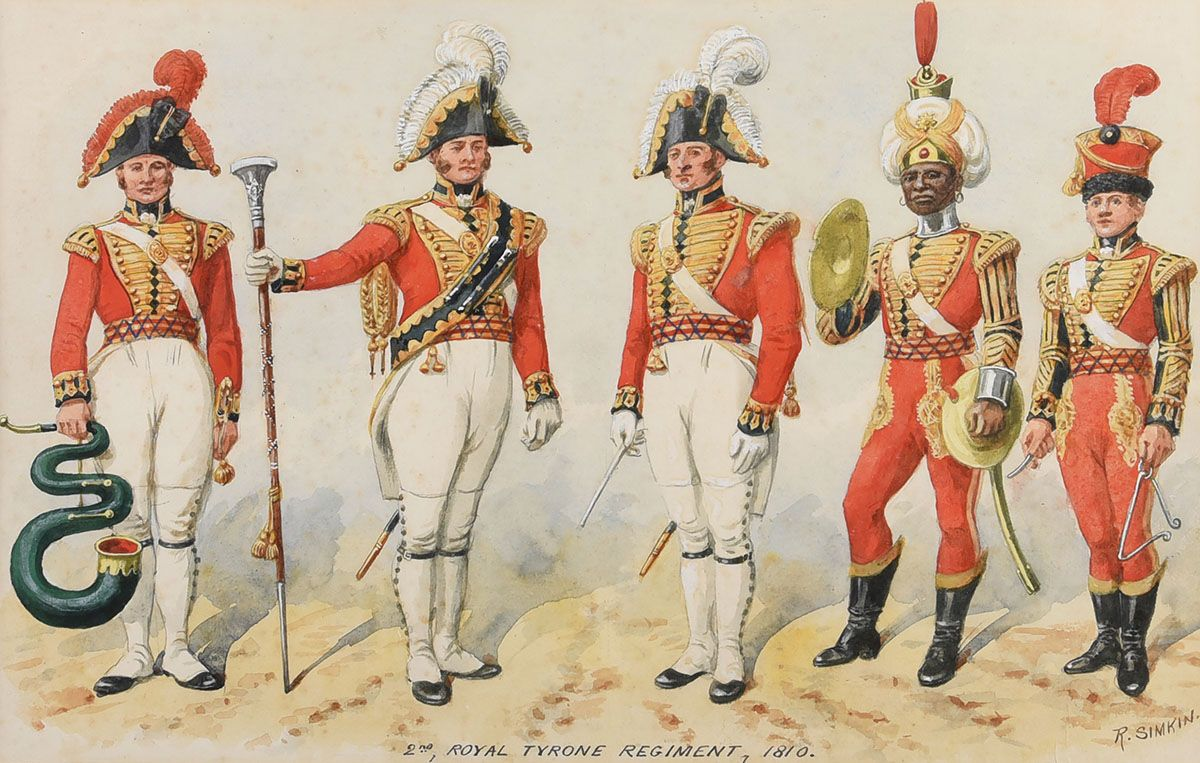
A Royal Tyrone Militia drum major (second from left) in 1810)

The position of drum major originated in England with the corps of drums in 1650. Military groups performed mostly duty calls and battle signals during that period, and a fife and drum corps, directed by the drum major, would execute short pieces to communicate to field units. With the arrival of military concert bands and pipe bands around the 18th century, the position of the drum major was adapted to those ensembles.

Traditionally, a military drum major was responsible for:

- Defending the drummers and bandsmen (The drums and bugles were communication devices)
- Military discipline of all corps of drums and pipe band members
- Overall standards of dress and deportment of the corps of drums and the pipe band
- Corps of drums administrative work
- Maintain the corps of drums' standard of military drill, and choreograph marching movements

The drum major was also given duties in the battalion at several points in history, which included the administering of military justice (lashing), to any member of the battalion, and collecting the battalion's post.

In addition to the duties above, The British Army also included a royal appointment of Drum Major General, whose duties included inspecting all other field music as well as (per The Drummer's Handbook) granting drummers licences, without which one would not be recognised as a drummer. This position was discontinued in the 18th century.

== Tasks ==
The main task of a military drum major is to control the tempo that the band plays at as well as set the marching pace. A secondary role may be conducting the music of the appropriate music for the band. Another major task for drum majors is giving certain drill commands to the entire to denote whether to turn to the left or right, perform a counter march or mark time, or halt and cut off the music. Depending on the size of the band, there may be up to four drum majors on hand, with one serving as the senior drum major. In a massed bands formation which involves multiple bands, there may be 10-12 drum majors present, with either one or two bearing the duty as senior drum major. In the British Armed Forces, every band only has a single drum major; where massed bands are present, one will act as senior drum major. All drum majors use a ceremonial mace to give commands while marching and performing.

== Gallery ==
United Kingdom

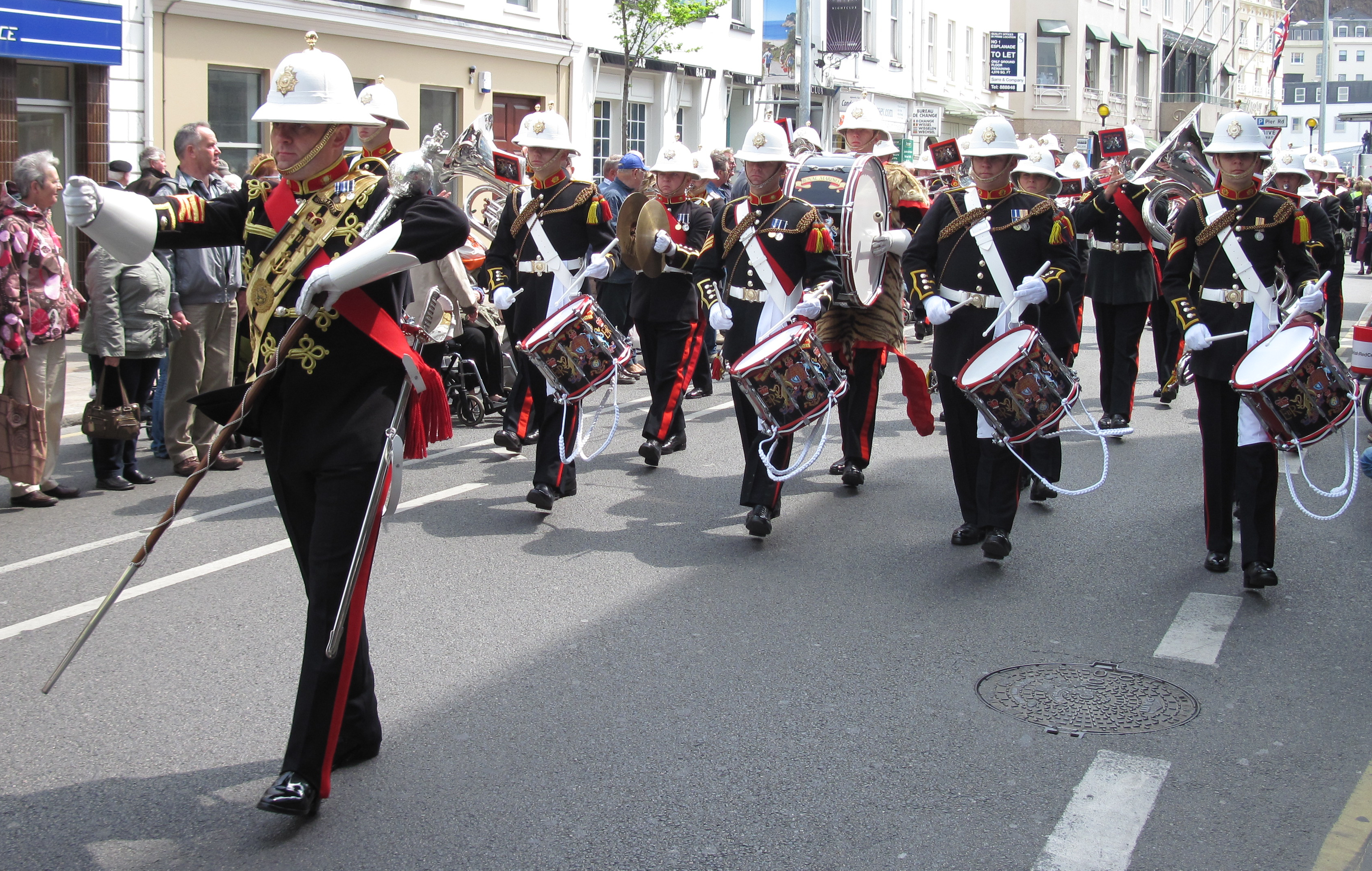
Drum Major and the Band of His Majesty's Royal Marines

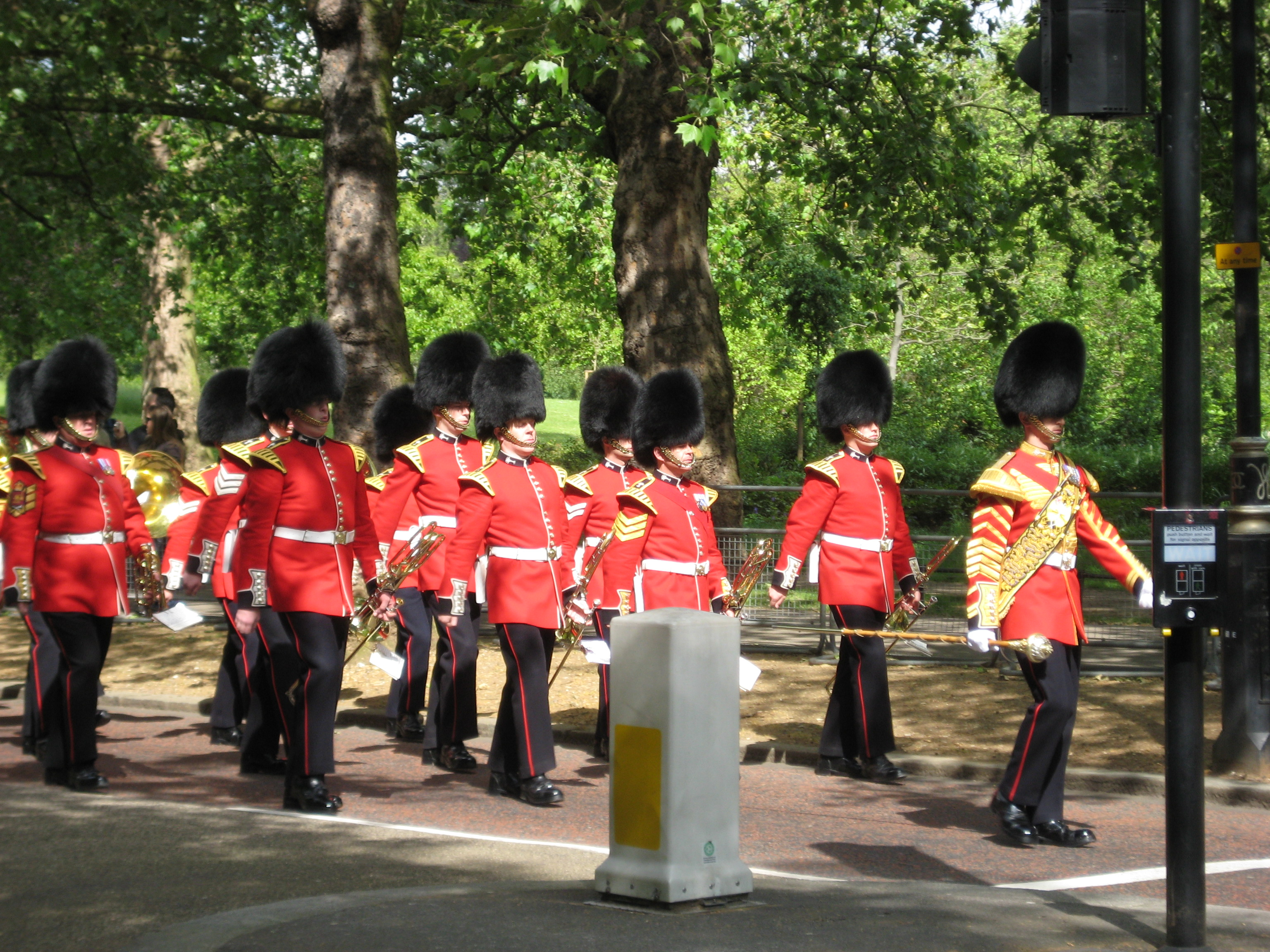
Drum Major and the Band of the Welsh Guards

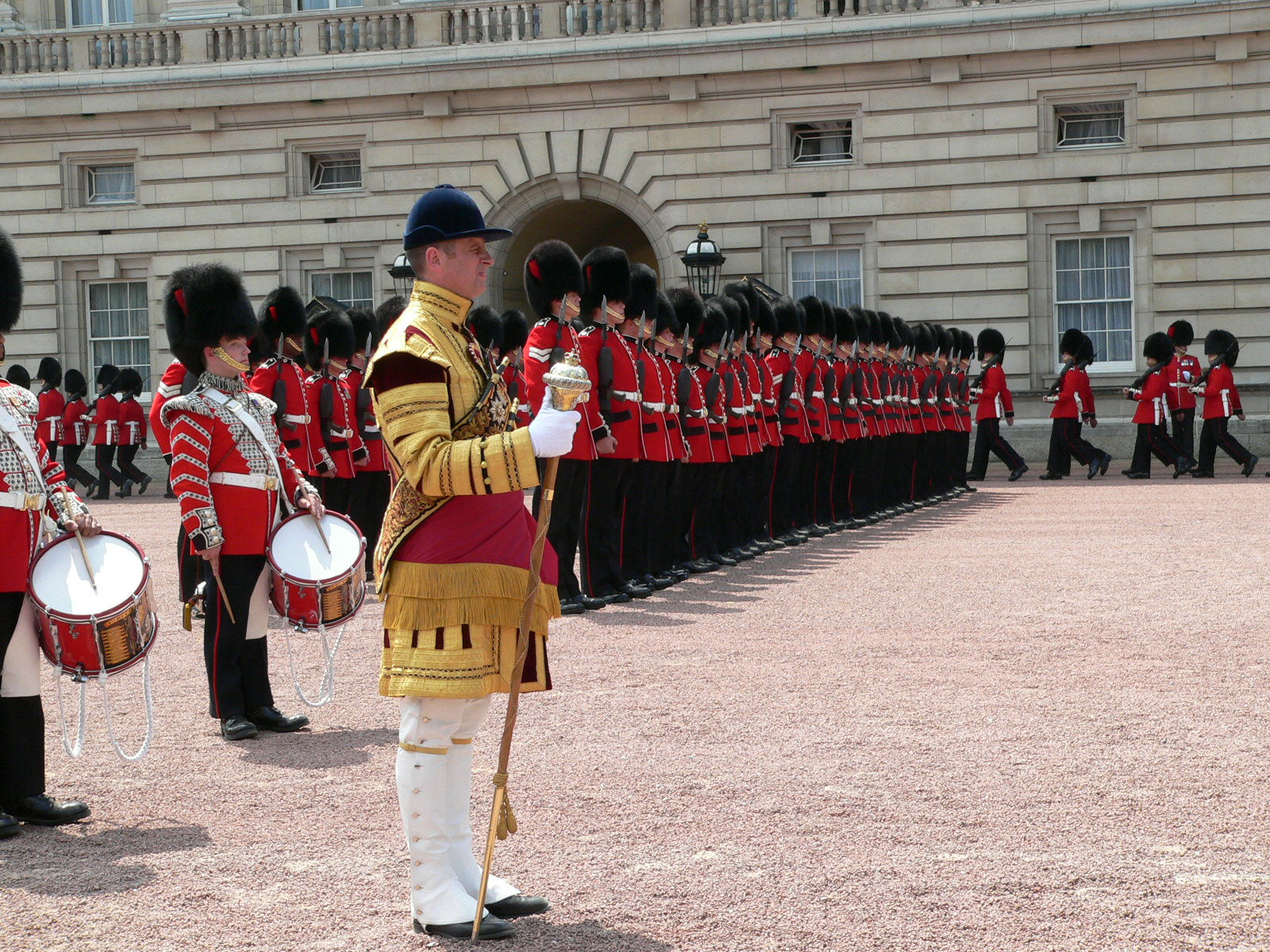
Drum Major in state dress (unchanged since 1685) and the Coldstream Guards Corps of Drums

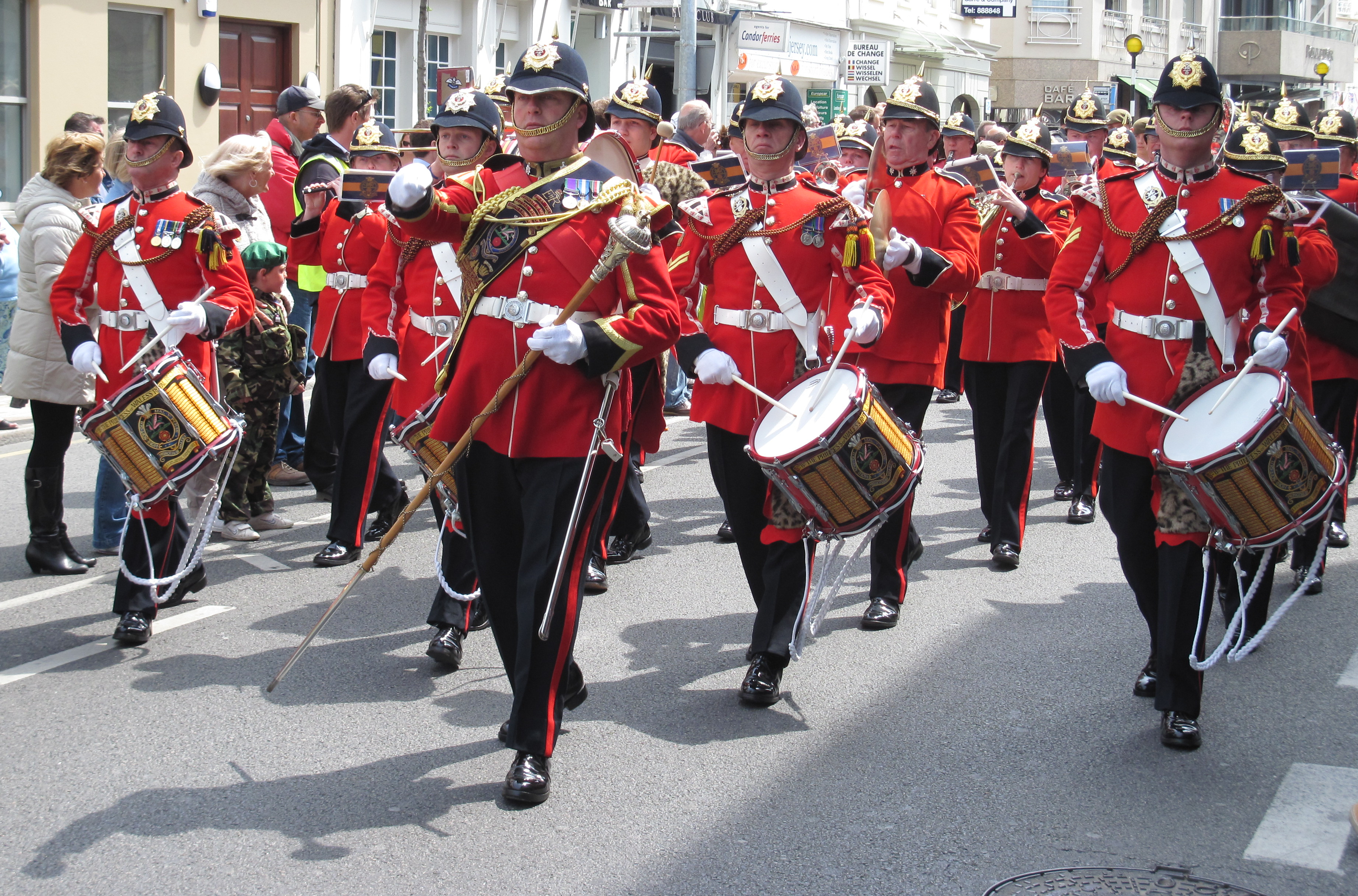
Line Infantry Drum Major, Corps of Drums and Band (Princess of Wales's Royal Regiment)

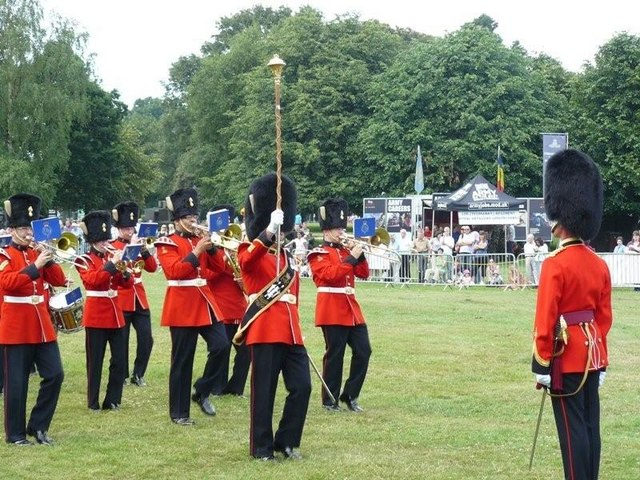
Drum Major, Royal Regiment of Fusiliers (Minden Band of the Queen's Division)

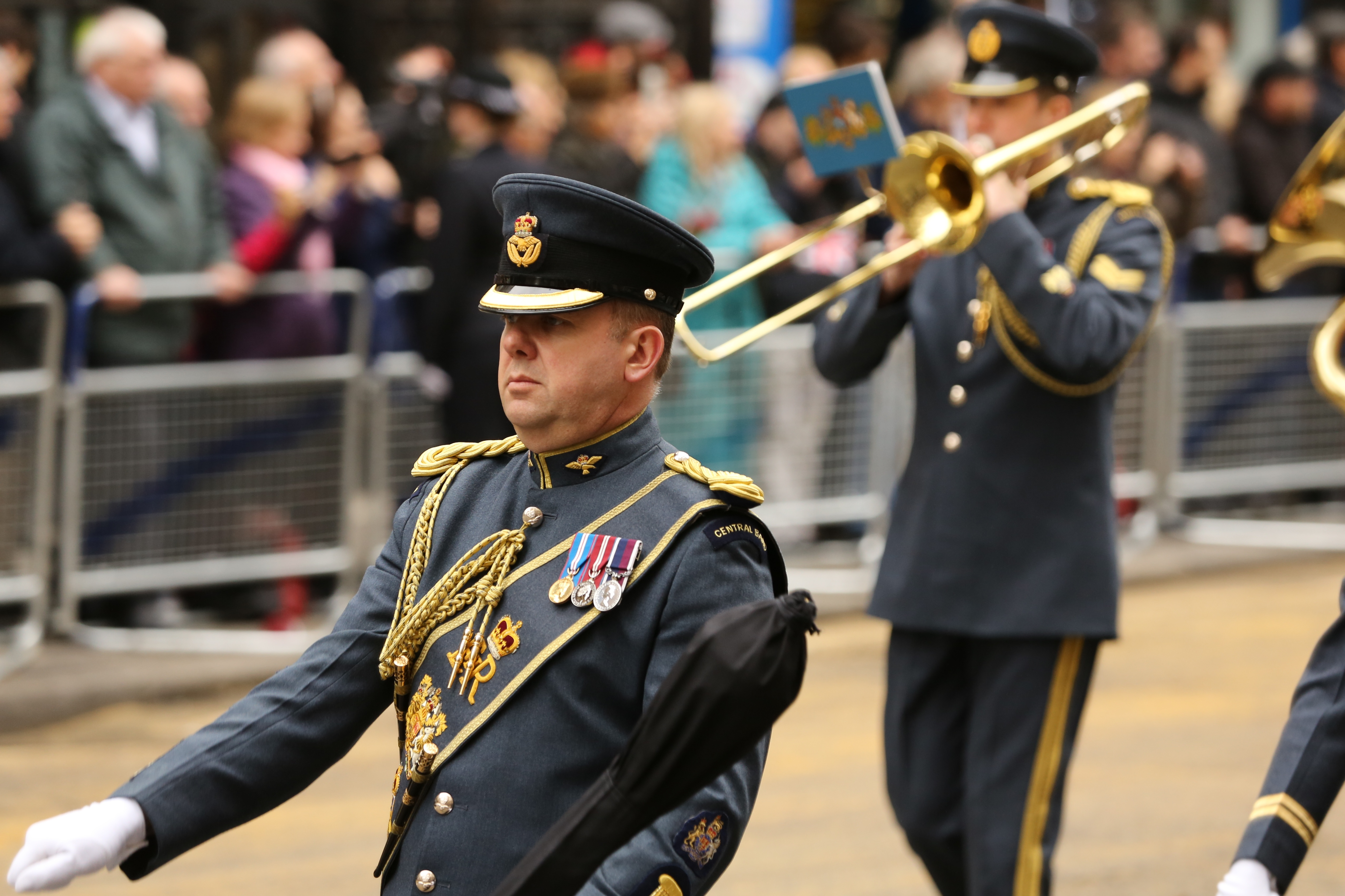
Drum Major (Warrant Officer), Royal Air Force

United States

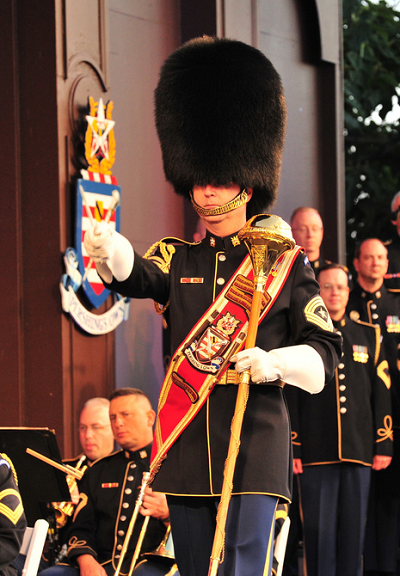
Drum Major, United States Army Band

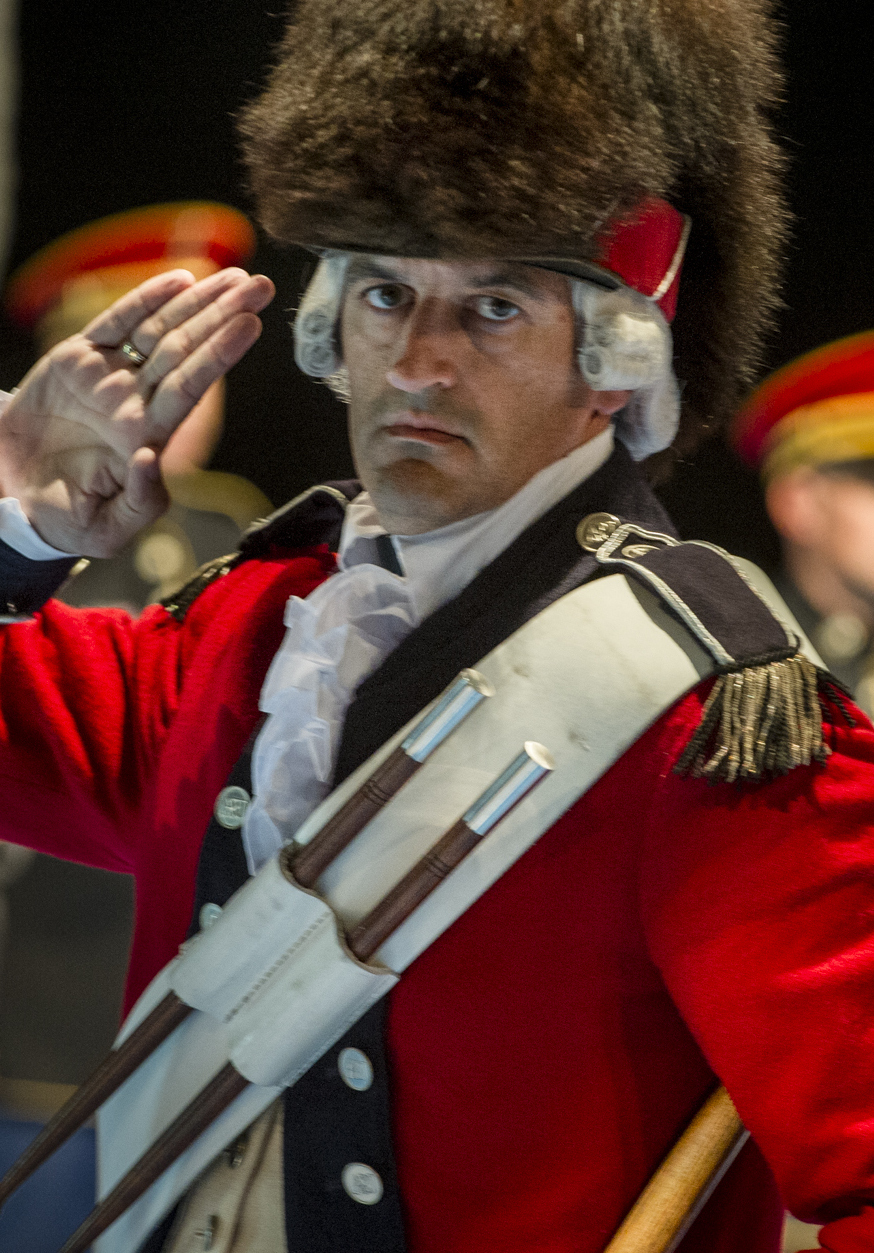
Drum Major, Old Guard Fife and Drum Corps

Drum Majors of the ”The Commandant’s Own” (left) and the “The President’s Own” (right)

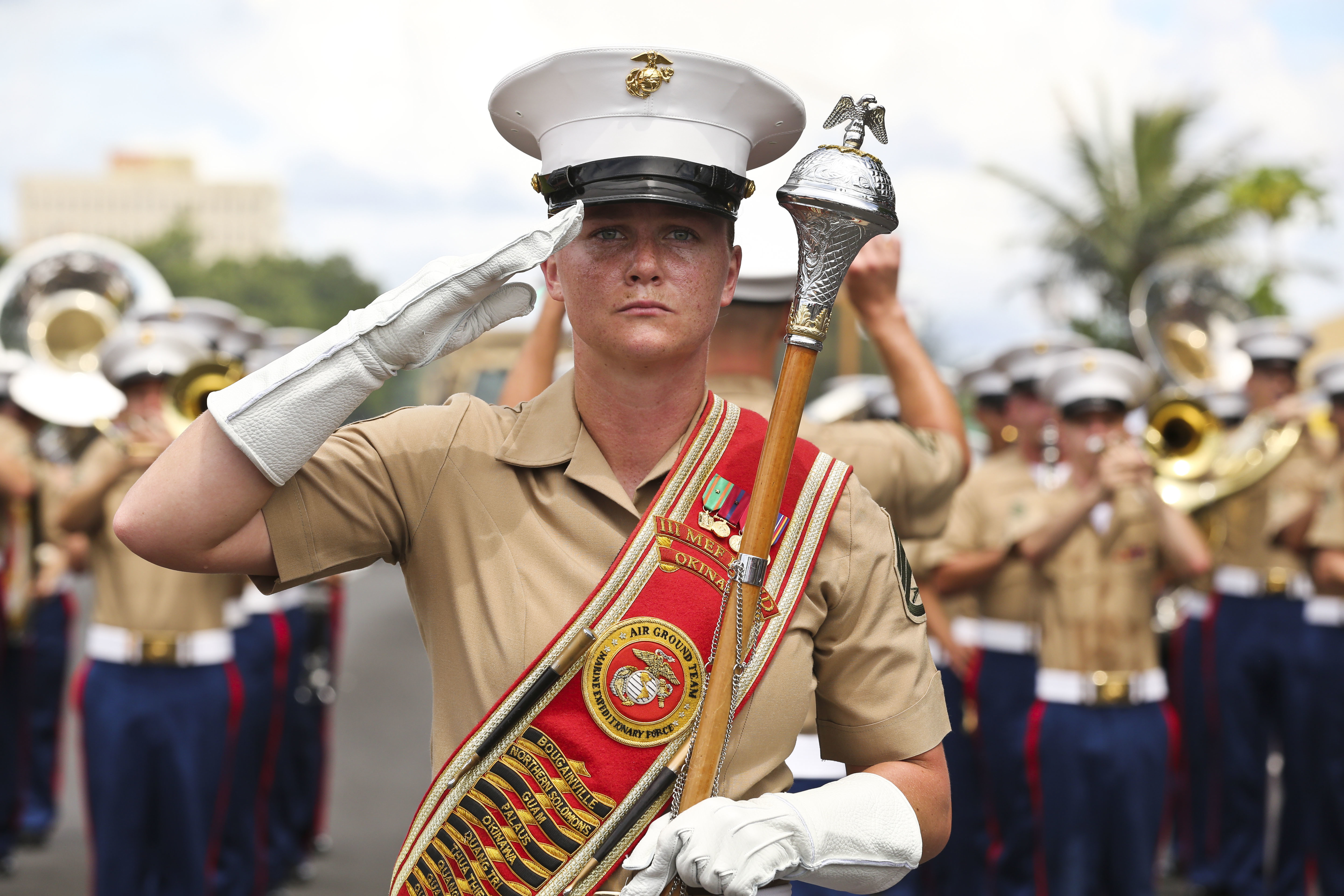
A drum major of the III Marine Expeditionary Forces in 2019

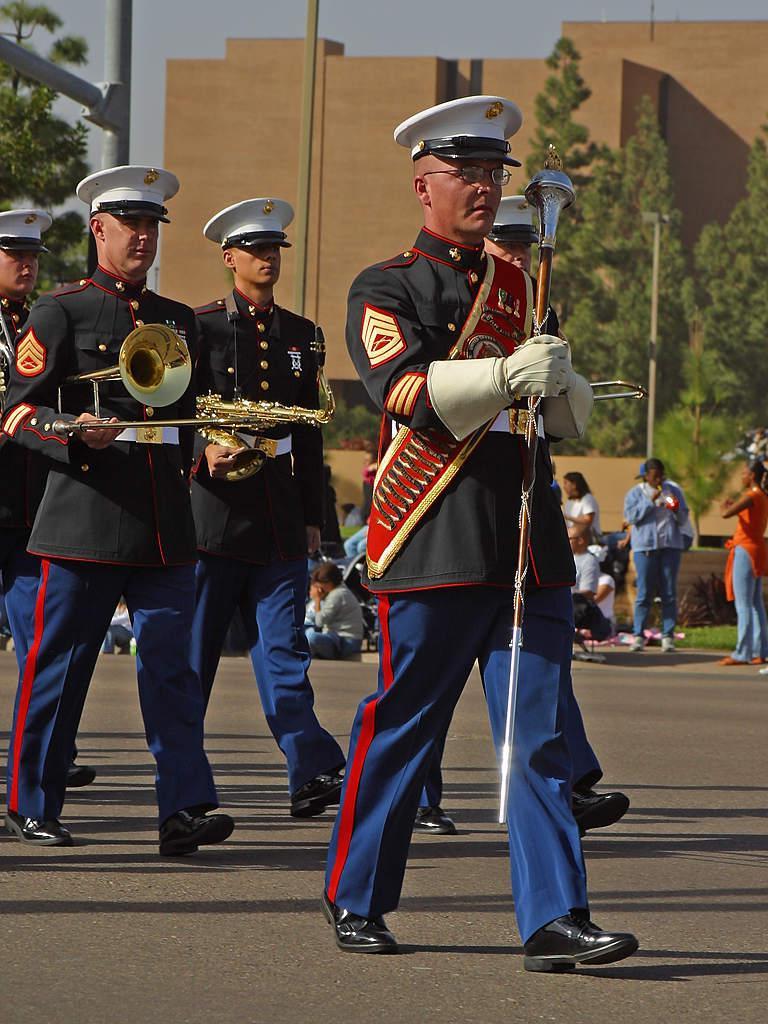
Drum Major, Marine Corps Recruit Depot San Diego Band

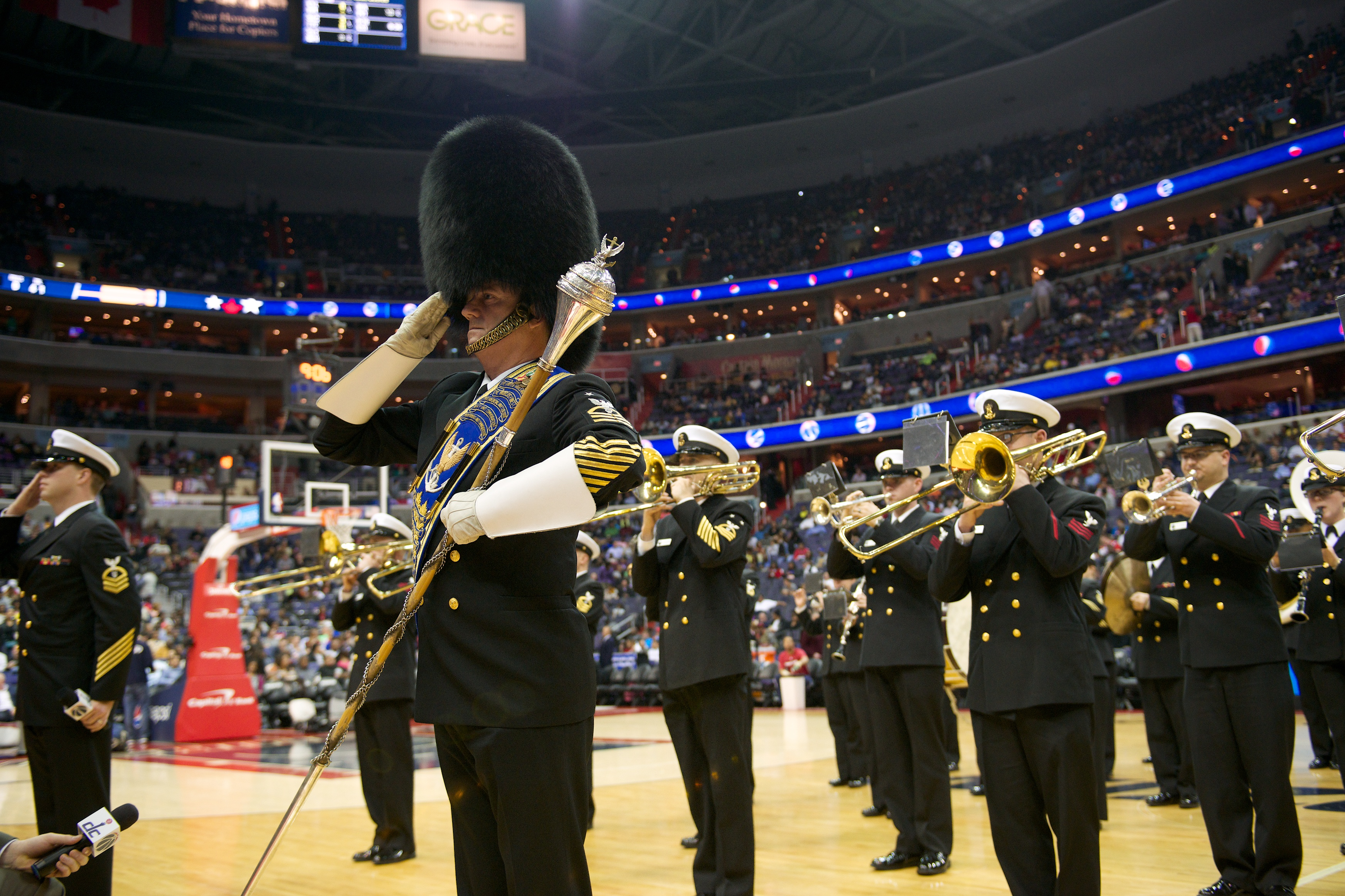
Drum Major, United States Navy Band

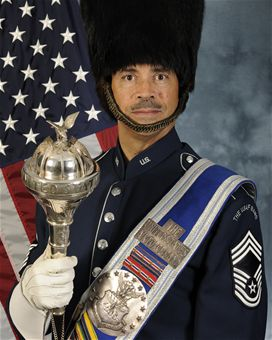
Drum Major, United States Air Force Band

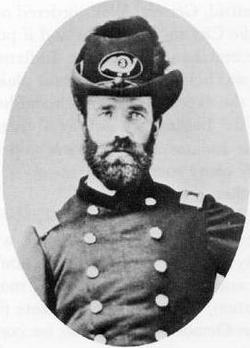
Drum Major, Dimick B. Huntington, Nauvoo Legion Band

Former Soviet Union

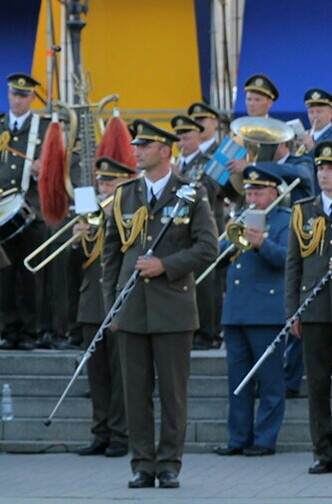
Ukrainian Drum Major

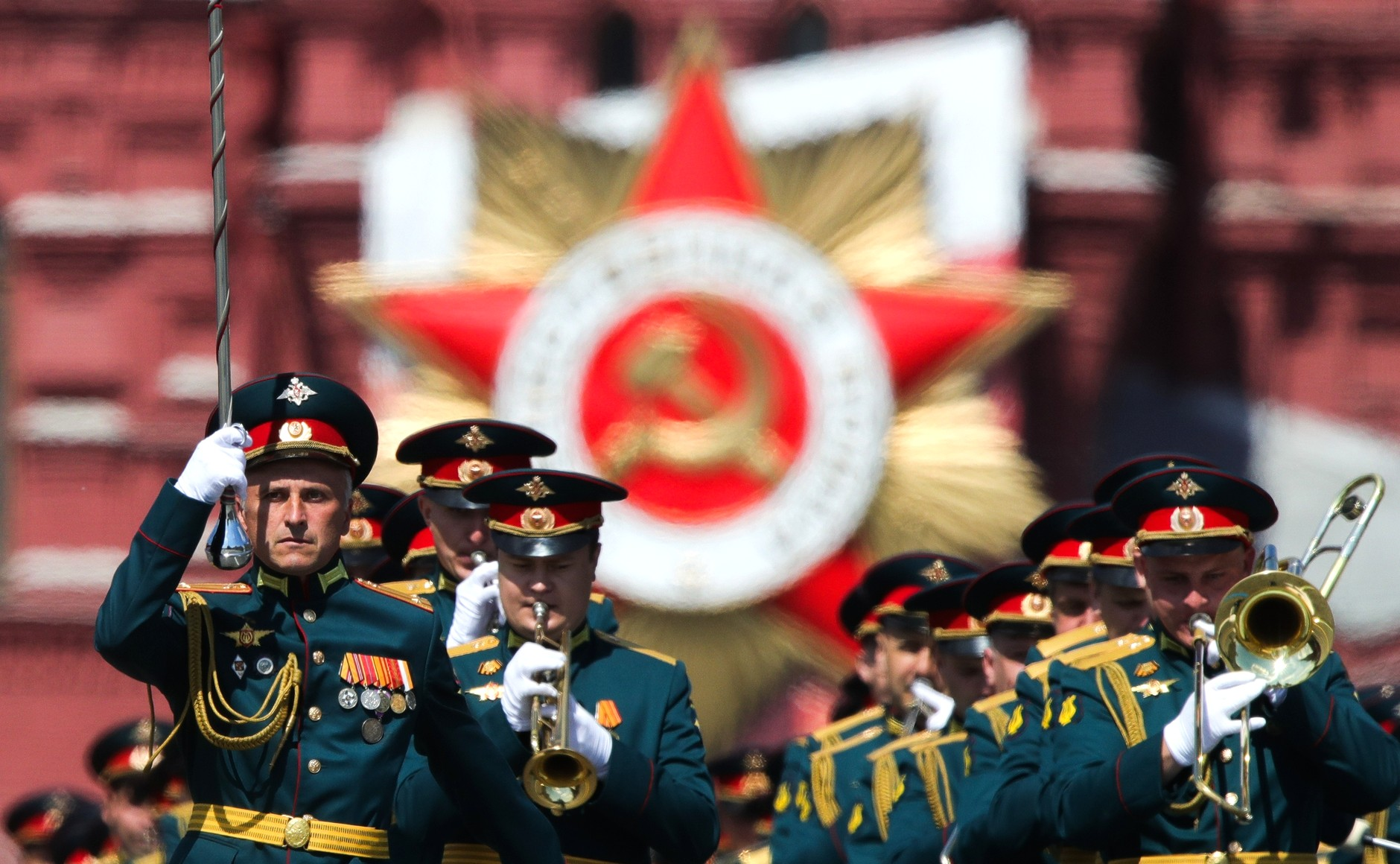
A Russian drum major at the 2020 Moscow Victory Day Parade

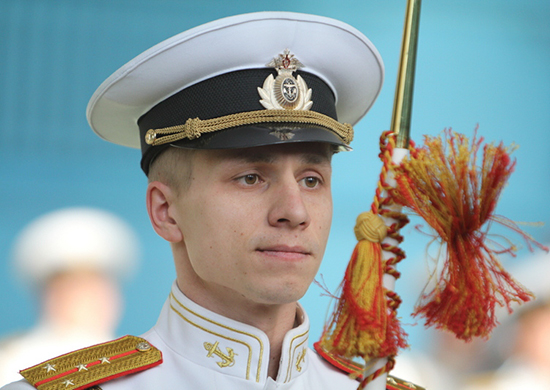
Drum Major, Military Band of the Pacific Fleet

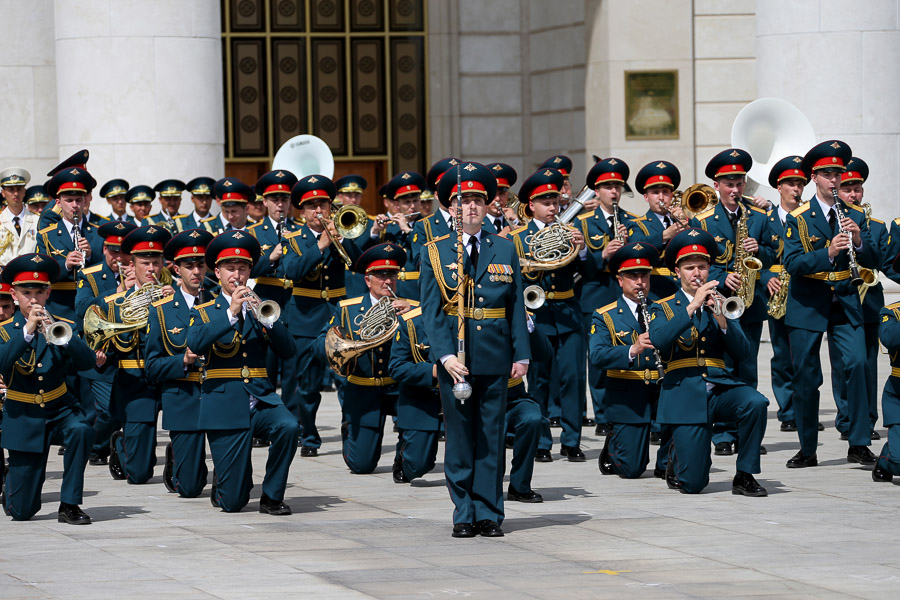
Drum Major, Central Military Band of the Ministry of Defense of Russia

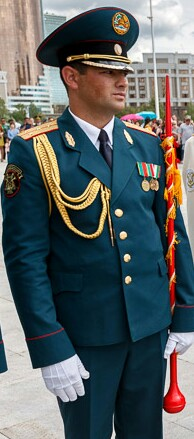
Drum Major, Military Brass Band of the Commandant Regiment of the Ministry of Defense of Tajikistan

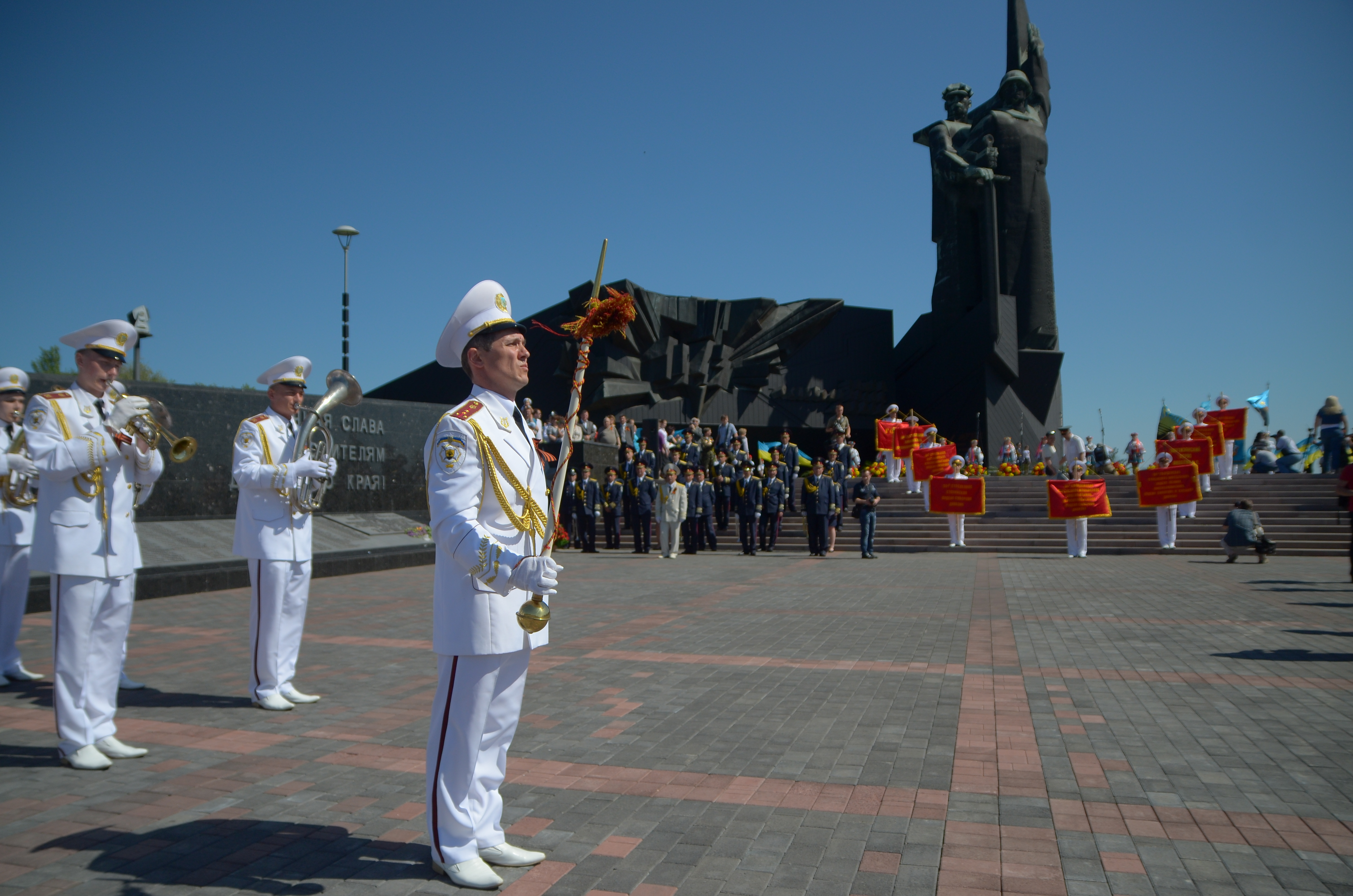
Drum Major, Band of the Donetsk Garrison

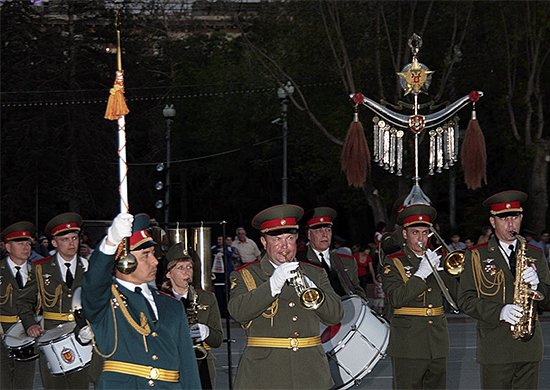
Drum Major, Military Band of the Eastern Military District

China

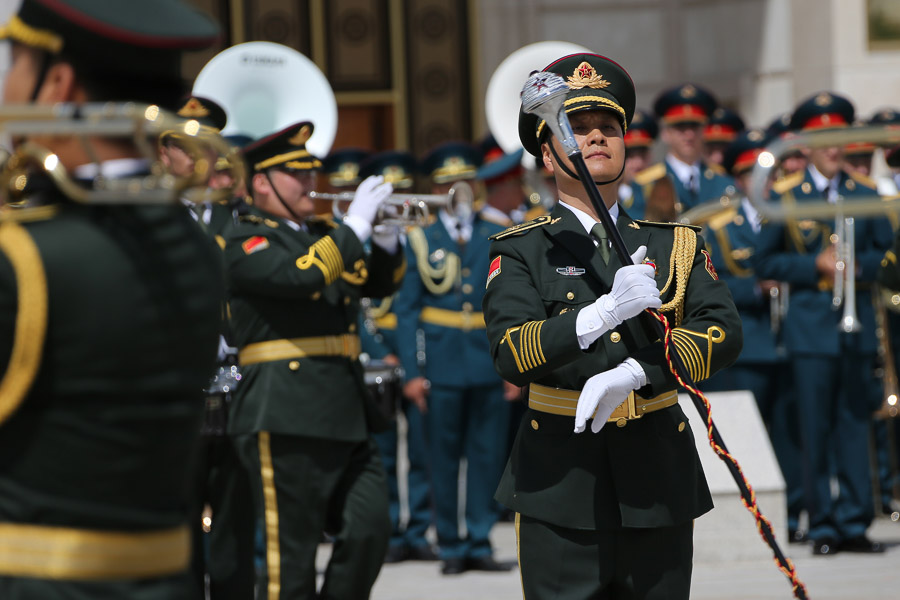
Drum Major, Central Military Band of the People's Liberation Army of China

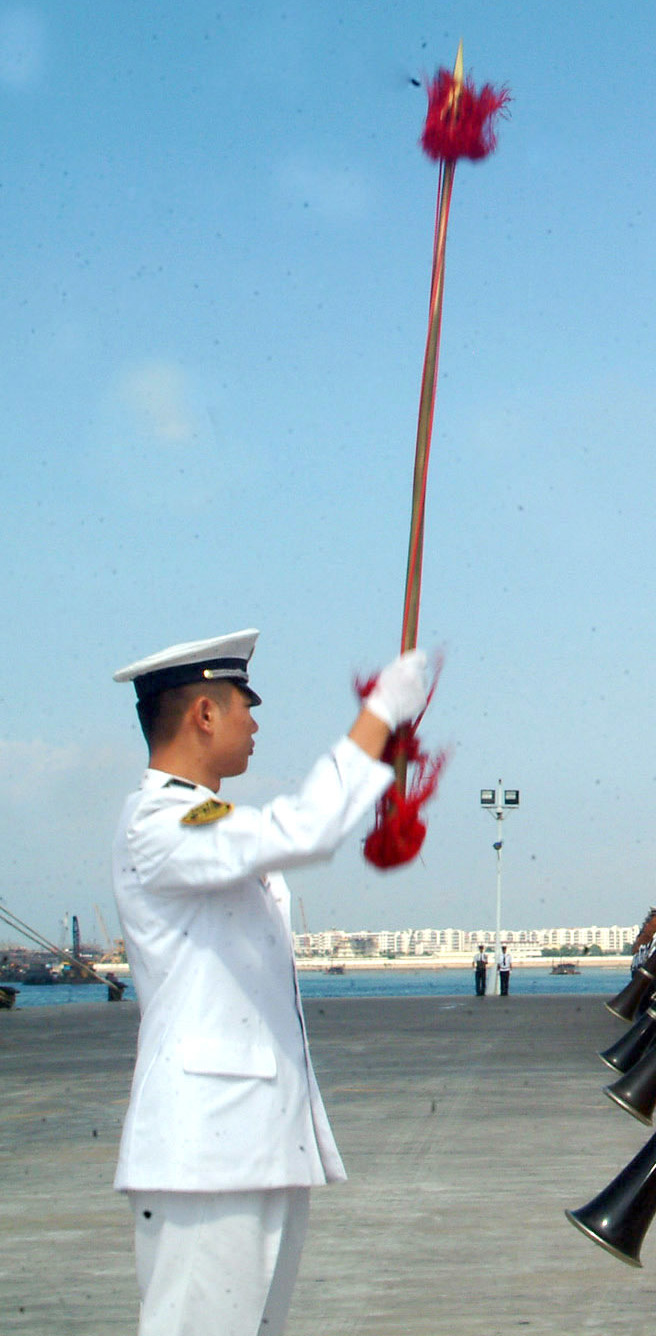
Drum Major, People's Liberation Army Navy Band

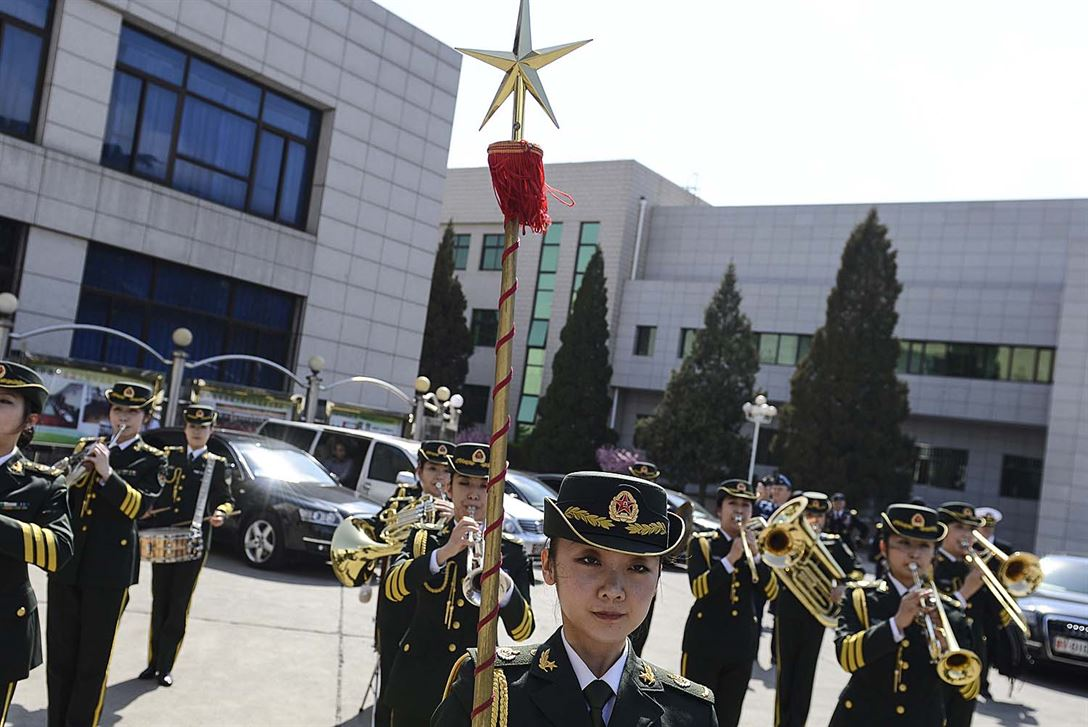
Drum Major, Women's Military Band of the PLA National Defense University

Malaysia

Drum Major, Royal Malay Regiment Band
