= Drum major general =

The Drum Major General was a royal appointment in the British Army used from the mid-17th century and into the 18th century. Under this appointment, all training and licensing of military drummers took place.

== List of Drum Major Generals ==
The following individuals held the appointment of Drum Major General, with date of appointment:

- 20 June 1660 – John Maugridge
- 1 May 1688 – John Maugridge
- 24 April 1705 – Robert Maugridge Jnr.
- 18 February 1720 – John Clothier
- 4 February 1754 – John Conquest
- c.1762 – L. Higgins
- 1766 – H. Moore
- 4 January 1777 – C. Stuart
- 6 February 1791 – William Hood

== See also ==
- Drum major
- Corps of drums
- Royal Corps of Army Music
