= Steven Daniel =

American actor and musician

- Born: Hartford, Connecticut, United States
- Occupations: Actor; Musician
- Years active: 1997–2004

Steven Tyrone Daniel is an American actor and musician. He is best known for his role as Lionel "El-Train" Johnson on the NBC Saturday morning sitcom City Guys. After City Guys ended in 2001, he guest starred in NYPD Blue and Charmed in 2002 and 2003, respectively. He also appeared in a few independent films; his last acting credit was in the film The Least Likely Candidate (2004).

As a musician, Daniel released the gospel-influenced hip-hop album Hiphopcrisy (2001).
