= List of Married... with Children characters =

The show Married... with Children revolves around Al Bundy, his wife Peggy, their children Kelly and Bud, next-door neighbor Marcy and her husband Steve Rhoades. Rhoades leaves in Season 4 and is eventually replaced by Jefferson D'Arcy.

== Overview ==
Actor	Character	Seasons										
Actor	Character	1	2	3	4	5	6	7	8	9	10	11
Ed O'Neill	Al Bundy	Main	Main	Main	Main	Main	Main	Main	Main	Main	Main	Main
Katey Sagal	Peggy Bundy	Main	Main	Main	Main	Main	Main	Main	Main	Main	Main	Main
Christina Applegate	Kelly Bundy	Main	Main	Main	Main	Main	Main	Main	Main	Main	Main	Main
David Faustino	Bud Bundy	Main	Main	Main	Main	Main	Main	Main	Main	Main	Main	Main
Amanda Bearse	Marcy D'Arcy/Rhoades	Main	Main	Main	Main	Main	Main	Main	Main	Main	Main	Main
David Garrison	Steve Rhoades	Main	Main	Main	Main		Guest	Guest		Guest		
Ted McGinley	Jefferson D'Arcy					Main	Main	Main	Main	Main	Main	Main

The creators of the show named the "Bundy" family after their favorite professional wrestler, King Kong Bundy, though some fans mistakenly believed that the name was derived from serial killer Ted Bundy. King Kong Bundy once appeared on the show as Peggy's hick inbred uncle Irwin, and again appeared as his wrestling persona, since "NO MA'AM" (National Organization of Men Against Amazonian Masterhood, a fictional club depicted on the show) were big fans of the wrestler.

The Bundys' next-door neighbors Steve and Marcy Rhoades, were named after another pro wrestler, Dusty Rhodes, who was well-known during the show's run.

== Main characters ==
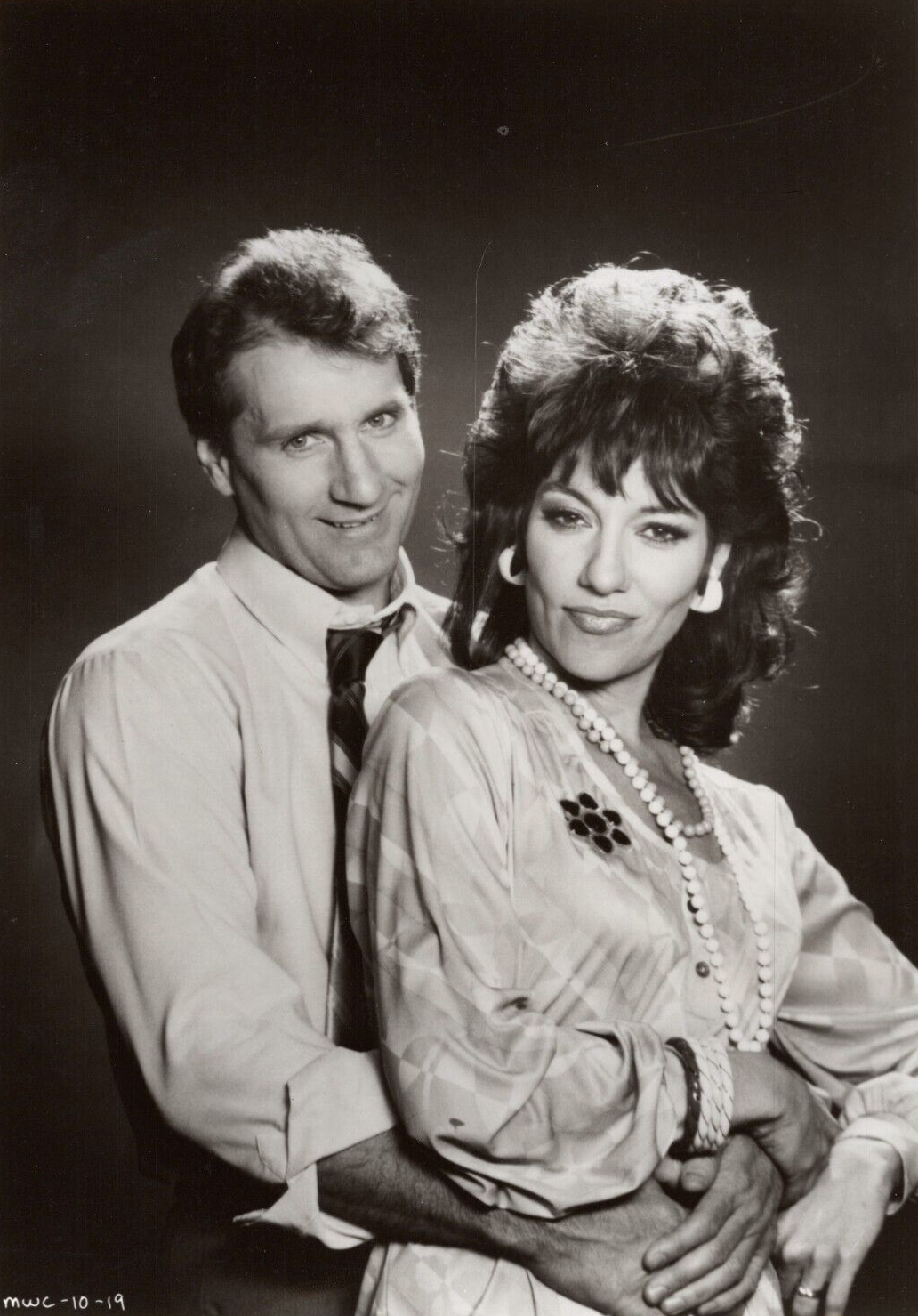
Ed O'Neill and Katey Sagal as Al and Peggy Bundy, 1987

=== Al Bundy ===
Alphonse "Al" Bundy (Ed O'Neill), the head of the Bundy family, is doomed to fail in all aspirations because of the "Bundy curse." Once a promising fullback for fictional Polk High School (his proudest moment in life was scoring four touchdowns in a single game), he was on his way to college on a scholarship until he broke his leg, and ended up as a shoe salesman at "Gary's Shoes" in the "New Market Mall", located in an incorporated area of suburban Chicago. Shortly thereafter, Al married Margaret "Peg" Wanker on May 10, 1971, after allegedly proposing while inebriated. The two later went on to have two children, Kelly and Bud. In a season five episode that aired in 1990, it is mentioned that Al is 43 years old. Much like the name "Rhoades", the creators chose the surname "Bundy" after professional wrestler King Kong Bundy (Christopher Alan Pallies, who later guest-starred as one of Peggy's 'Wanker' relatives).

Al often spends time attempting to recapture his glory days, but is usually undermined in spectacular fashion by frequent bad luck and poor judgment. He considers his family to be the cause of his failures, and his resentment of them (and aversion to sex with Peg) provides much of the show's humor. Despite his familial disappointments, Al frequently displays begrudging devotion to his wife and children. He is protective of his daughter Kelly and commonly beats up her boyfriends. When he becomes aware that Peg frequented a male strip club, he threatened one of its strippers, saying that "if my wife loses anything in your pants, so will you." On a semi-regular basis, he is seen bonding with his son, Bud. Despite his attraction to other women, he remains faithful to his family and chooses not to cheat on them, demonstrating his commitment and love for them.

He frequently goes to "nudie bars" and strip clubs with his friends, the most prominent of which is called "The Jiggly Room", featured during the series' final four seasons. The only thing that seems to consistently put Al in the mood for sex with his wife is watching her do manual labor, which very seldom happens.

Al is said to have extreme foot odor, prefers the escapism of television and bowling over his dysfunctional family, and life of drudgery and starvation (as Peg refuses to cook, she claims that she is allergic to fire, despite the fact that she smokes cigarettes in the early seasons) and is often seen in his trademark couch potato pose — seated on the sofa with one hand stuck under the waistband of his pants. The foot perspiration is not his only health issue; once, in 1983, he had a bad case of dandruff. He also has terrible teeth, as noted in the episode "Tooth or Consequences," where his extremely poor dental hygiene leads to a trip to the dentist with typical bad luck results. A running gag in the series is Al's apparent habit of overflowing the toilet when using the bathroom.

Another running joke used throughout the series is that being a shoe salesman, Al earns little more than minimum wage. In the episode "How Bleen Was My Kelly", Al uses a desktop computer to find how much money he makes on a daily basis and learns that he makes less than a local paperboy. By using the computer's search engine, Al learns that everyone around the world, from a dirt vendor in Pakistan to an Eskimo blubber chewer in Nome, Alaska, makes more money in one day than Al does by selling women's shoes, except for one person, Peg.

When Al returns home, he often tells an anecdote about his work, almost always beginning with the words "A fat woman came into the store today".

Al's favorite television series, the fictional Western show "Psycho Dad", was a source of joy and entertainment that Al seemingly, at times, wanted to emulate. He would hum the words to the theme song, and pretend to "shoot" his fictional gun while watching the show. His other joys were Westerns, often John Wayne films, most notably Hondo, until Peg's family ruined his recording of the movie by taping over it with a song dedicated to her. He has also referenced Shane when the clan ruined his enjoyment of that movie.

Al also owns a "faithful" 1974 Dodge that invariably had failed brakes, constant breakdowns and numerous other problems associated with its age and mileage. At the time of the fourth season at least, Al was still paying it off, despite it being well over 20 years old. By the eighth season, the Dodge had passed one million miles. Al's Dodge actually appears to be a 1972 Plymouth Duster in one early episode; however, it is only referred to as "The Dodge" and is supposedly constructed of the various parts of other wrecked and mangled Dodges.

The producers originally wanted to cast comedian Sam Kinison as Al Bundy. However, they ultimately chose not to, due to the profaneness of Kinison's comedy routines. Kinison would later play Al's guardian angel in the episode "It's a Bundyful Life", spoofing Frank Capra's It's a Wonderful Life. The producers also considered Michael Richards for the role. The producers stated in interviews that they were also attempting to determine what a good "mission statement" would be for the show, and ultimately went with the first sound heard on the first episode — that of Al flushing a toilet.

=== Peg Bundy ===
Margaret "Peg"/"Peggy" Bundy, née Wanker (Katey Sagal), is Al's lazy, self-indulgent wife. She refuses to work, cook, or clean the house (although Peg occasionally displays an ability for domestic aptitude). She cites her laziness as family tradition, getting upset with Kelly when she gets a job. She claims that Wanker women never work, and in old pioneer days, "Wanker women were getting their hair done while Wanker men got theirs scalped." During the day, she likes to watch daytime talk-shows, sit on the living room couch, and eat copious amounts of ice-cream BonBons (without ever gaining weight). Peg is a redhead (brunette in the first two seasons) with a bouffant hairdo, and she usually wears combinations of modern-day 1980/1990s and dated 1960s-styled fashions with skin tight Spandex pants and shirts, and stiletto heels, which make her walk in a unique way. Peg smoked cigarettes in the first four seasons, but then quit. Her favorite TV shows are Oprah and Donahue, but she also enjoys watching the Shop at Home Network. Peg continually squanders what little money Al makes on extravagant spending sprees, including everything from expensive clothes to useless trinkets, and even steals from her children to get extra cash.

Peg and Al married in 1971. Late in the first season, she says she married Al on a dare, although this may have been just a sarcastic comment. In the fourth season, it was revealed that she did not actually graduate from high school, failing to meet a half-credit in home economics. She later returned to school, earning her diploma, but only by stealing Kelly's final exam and tricking her into going to summer school.

Her family, the Wankers, hail from the fictitious rural Wanker County, Wisconsin, where "as Einstein put it, everyone's relative." At Peg and Al's high school reunion, her rival greeted her with "Peggy... Peggy Wanker... don't bother to thank her." It is never made clear how she managed to go to high school in Chicago with Al when her parents apparently never left Wanker County.

Unlike Al, Peg greatly desires marital sex despite constantly complaining about Al's lack of endurance and Al's general antipathy towards sex with her. She does not seem to mind her husband ogling other women, reading pornographic magazines, or going to strip joints. Her enthusiasm has caused some of the male strip joints she visits to establish the "Bundy rule," where women can no longer go into the back rooms to meet the dancers, nor is the establishment responsible for anything lost down a dancer's costume.

During season six, Peg becomes pregnant (Sagal's own pregnancy being written into the show). However, Sagal suffered a miscarriage, so the writers turned the whole story arc into one of Al's nightmares. Sagal became pregnant twice more during the series' run, but instead of writing those pregnancies into the show, the producers used camera shots from above the stomach or wrote episodes without the character of Peg, explaining her absence by having her set out in search of her missing father (who appeared in a few episodes, played by Tim Conway), and only occasionally calling home.

Despite her continuous put-downs of Al and general indifference towards their family, she demonstrated genuine feelings towards him on at least one occasion when a successful childhood classmate (Vanna White) comes back to town and reveals she has long harbored feelings for Al, offering Peg $500,000 for one night with him. Though they initially agreed to the offer, Peg ultimately refuses, as she can't bear the thought of Al being with another woman. During a televised cast reunion, Katey Sagal said that she believed Peg "thought [Al] was hot" due to her inability to keep her hands off him.

The role was originally offered to Roseanne Barr, but she turned it down. The producers cast Sagal, who came up with Peg's appearance, wanting to satirize the TV housewives of the 1960s. Entertainment Weekly listed Sagal's role as Peg for the "Biggest Emmy Snub." In 2009, Peg was included in Yahoo!'s Top 10 TV Moms from Six Decades of Television for the decade 1987–1997. In May 2012, she was one of the 12 moms chosen by users of iVillage on their list of "Mommy Dearest: The TV Moms You Love".

In one of the episodes, Peg's birthday is mentioned, which is on April 12.

=== Kelly Bundy ===
Kelly Bundy (Christina Applegate) is the older child in the Bundy family, born in 1972. "Pumpkin," as Al often calls her, is promiscuous and beautiful, tends to hang out with "slacker" guys, and exemplifies the stereotypical "dumb blonde". Al is annoyed by Kelly's promiscuity and tends to treat her various love interests with a combination of derision and violence; in numerous episodes, he leads them to the front door, feigning friendliness, only to walk them head-first into the wall before tossing them out the door.

During the first season, Kelly is portrayed as a rather average and normal teenage girl: sarcastic and rebellious, but not as dimwitted as she would later be depicted. After the first season, she steadily becomes more dense and provocative, and typically dressed in more skimpy outfits. Despite being generally portrayed as a dullard, the show occasionally hints at Kelly's ironic intrinsic intellectual ability, which only exhibits itself on those rare occasions when she is not preoccupied with her social status or men. It has been demonstrated that she can absorb a limited amount of information very well, but will forget something that she learned in the past once her limit is reached. Kelly is also known to display excellent hand/eye coordination when playing pool or performing archery. She shows some characteristics of an idiot savant. One episode showed a flashback to when she was a toddler, showing her as a child prodigy, until a knock to the head caused the change of personality that Kelly would be better known for.

Christina Applegate has said that she didn't consider Kelly to be necessarily unintelligent, but rather as someone with an unconventional thought process (i.e. she was capable of learning and intellectually solving problems, but she did so in a manner that deviated from the more common linear logic).

Kelly's comedic function tends to include blatant displays of naivety and ignorance, with the typical response by the family of willfully allowing her to remain ignorant. Bud, in particular, likes to sow misconceptions in her mind. For example, she asks Bud to help her with her book report on Robinson Crusoe, but ends up reviewing Gilligan's Island instead. After graduating high school in 1990, she works as a model and waitress. By the final seasons, Kelly appears to have matured into an independent woman with a more enhanced insight and street smarts.

Though she often pokes fun at her younger brother Bud for being underdeveloped and socially awkward, she often schemes with him to achieve whatever goal she has currently set for herself. On at least one occasion, Kelly has also avenged Bud by humiliating a girl who humiliated him. Her favorite comic strip is Garfield. Her less-than-stellar reading skills led to many comedic situations in which she would read the Garfield comic aloud, mispronouncing lasagna as "luh-sag-nee."

Tina Caspary was originally cast as Kelly, but after the original pilot was filmed, the show's producers felt that she did not quite fit the part, and she was replaced by Applegate. Applegate wrote on Twitter that she based her character on a woman in the 1988 documentary The Decline of Western Civilization Part II: The Metal Years. The film's director Penelope Spheeris later said that the specific woman who inspired Applegate was an exotic dancer in the film named Cindy. This woman won a dancing contest at an L.A. heavy metal club in the film, and afterwards is interviewed, saying that she was now going to continue on with her "actressing" career.

=== Bud Bundy ===
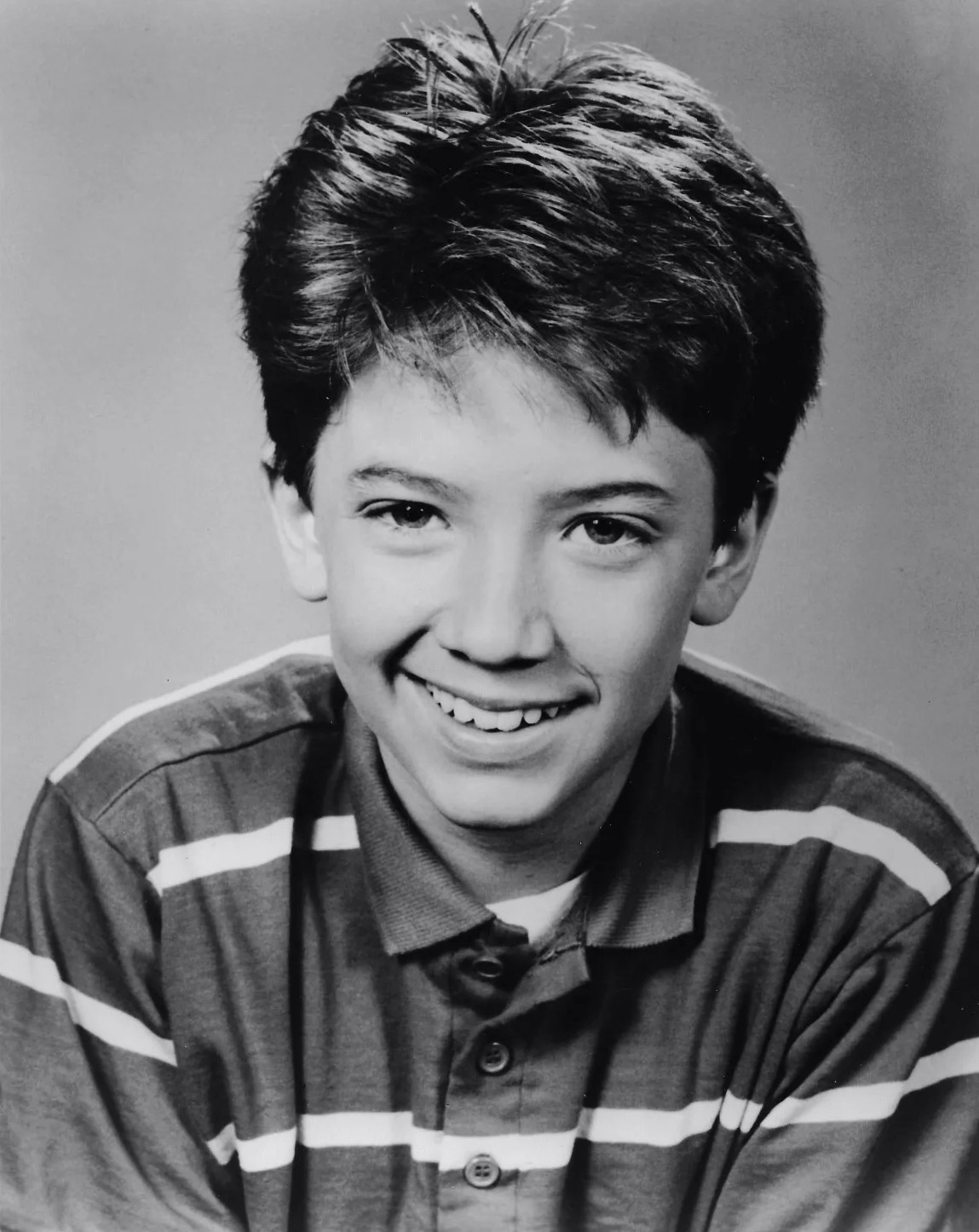
David Faustino as Bud Bundy, 1987

Budrick "Bud" Franklin Bundy (David Faustino) is the second child, born on January 22, 1974. In the original pilot, his name was going to be Ben. In the first season, Bud is said to be in fifth grade, making him 10 or 11, but in subsequent seasons, he was aged to be within one year of Kelly, graduating high school in 1991. He was named for Budweiser beer.

Upon the series premiere, Bud was generally depicted as a brat and antagonist, who especially enjoyed annoying his sister to the point of her extreme frustration. In subsequent seasons, he morphed into an unpopular, socially inept outcast, prone to self-serving schemes — many of which tended to involve attempts to impress girls. Bud regularly tries to boast himself to be attractive, sexy, and smooth, but is frequently rejected and/or caught in humiliating scenarios. In the fourth season, it is mentioned that he is still a virgin. Later in the series, having lost his virginity, he still remains generally unlucky in his pursuit of the opposite sex, despite the occasional one-night stand; one of which was with his cousin's fiancée, Janie, played by Joey Lauren Adams.

During his teenage years, Bud develops a fleeting crush on the Bundys' next door neighbor Marcy Rhoades, towards whom he makes several unsuccessful come-on attempts. Later, he develops a crush on Marcy's young niece, whom he sleeps with in one episode. He has a May–December fling with Al's (female) boss Gary, in which Gary treats Bud like wealthy men tend to treat their young, nubile, and unintelligent gold-digging dates. To the surprise of both Gary and his family, Bud isn't interested in being a "kept man" and breaks up with Gary over her disrespect for him. He tries to attract girls with the help of various alter egos, including street rapper "Grandmaster B" — a persona often ridiculed by his family, who call him everything from "Bell-Ringer B" to "Bed-Wetter B". Another alter-ego is "Cool Bud," Bud's sexual, suave side, with whom he eventually "merges", prompting him to become more "cool".

Like his parents and sister, Bud is a surprisingly adept fighter, exhibiting a talent for generally besting an adversary, no matter their size, and has no qualms about using chairs or tables to even the odds. Of the Bundys, Bud seems to be the most self-conscious and easily embarrassed of them; he often pretends not to know his family, even scheming against them on occasion. Throughout the series, Bud shares an adversarial sibling rivalry with Kelly, with both regularly mocking, insulting and taunting the other. Often, however, they will collaborate in schemes that are mutually beneficial, and will come to the other's defense when an outside entity threatens one of them. Toward the end of the series, Bud becomes Kelly's agent.

Bud is the most academically able member of his family, as he maintains a high grade point average throughout elementary, middle, and high school, consistently makes the honor roll, then attends college later in the series. He earns a scholarship, which the family accidentally spends when his deposited scholarship check turns up in Al's bank account instead. Upon hearing this, a furious Bud then forces himself to earn his bachelor's degree in psychology by working as a therapist.

Hunter Carson was originally cast as Bud, but after the original pilot was filmed, the show's producers felt that he did not quite fit the part, and so he was replaced by Faustino.

=== Marcy B. Rhoades/D'Arcy ===
Marcy B. Rhoades/D'Arcy (Amanda Bearse) is Peg's best friend, Al's nemesis, and the family's neighbor. Upon the series premiere, Marcy is married to the equally uptight Steve Rhoades. In the first episode 'Pilot' they introduce themselves to the Bundys as their new neighbors, who had wed three months earlier. Steve later divorces Marcy in February 1990, leaving her to languish for the rest of season four and the first half of season five as a desperate single, prone to depression and one-night stands. During season five, however, she eventually meets and has a fling with playboy Jefferson D'Arcy, who she marries soon after.

Initially, Marcy is depicted as a sweet, wholesome, conservative, and idealistic 1980s yuppie-type. As the seasons went on, however, she ultimately transforms into a more brash and edgier character, who can be as outrageous and vicious as the Bundys themselves. Generally a forward thinking feminist, Marcy is usually offended by Al's chauvinistic and misogynistic view of women. This commonly leads to contemptuous bickering between the two, while she often revels in his misery. She later becomes the founder and leader of a misandric support group called "F.A.N.G." (Feminists Against Neanderthal Guys). Despite Marcy's bitter rivalry with Al and her general contempt for the Bundy family as a whole, she and Peg remain close throughout the series. Although Marcy and Al are usually adversaries, they often unite in common causes, such as later when Jefferson comes into the series and when they share a mutual disgust for Peg's racy photo in an advertisement from a photo company in one episode. Their teamwork is attributable to the fact that they are both "bread-winners", giving them occasional moments of mutual understanding.

Marcy originally works as a loan officer at the city bank (in a higher position than her then-husband, Steve) and then as the manager of the Kyoto National Bank starting in the second season. For a brief time, she is demoted to being a drive-up window teller as a consequence for approving a loan Al could not repay. She wins back her old job after "frugging" on her boss's desk for 20 minutes, clad only in a slip, while the other drive-up window tellers toss quarters at her. Marcy states that she holds a bachelor's degree, double majoring in business and economics.

Despite having views that could later be considered radical, including environmentalism, Marcy identified herself as a Republican at various points in the series. In season six, Marcy announces that she was pregnant (though this is later revealed to be part of Al's dream about Peg's pregnancy).

One of the running gags in the entire series has Marcy often mistaken for a young boy, on one occasion being mistaken for Bruce Jenner and, on another occasion, for "the kid from Home Improvement". When she reminisces about her first training bra, Al disparagingly asks, "How old were you then - twenty five?" Al often compares her to a chicken throughout the series. Marcy often refers to Al as a two-toed sloth when she's particularly annoyed with his remarks.

Despite wanting to appear prudish, Marcy is shown to be a very sexual person who enjoys an array of sexual kinks. At one point late in the series, Al runs into a poorly disguised Marcy in the adult section of the local video rental store; she claims she's renting movies only to erase them.

=== Steve Rhoades ===
Stephen "Steve" Bartholomew Rhoades (David Garrison) is Marcy's first husband. Much like the name "Bundy" the creators chose the surname "Rhoades" after professional wrestler Dusty Rhodes. He is a banker who seems unfazed by his lower position than Marcy at the city bank. When Marcy moves up to a high position at another bank, he gets her former job. Steve is initially condescending to the Bundys, but eventually becomes more like them, and generally turns to Al for male-bonding. Marcy was initially attracted to him because of his self-centered materialism. He also becomes Al's friend, and Al usually drags him into his schemes.

Steve seems to be a fairly demure and buttoned-down character, compared to his wife and the Bundys, although he does show a dark side. As a banker, Steve takes sadistic pleasure in humiliating people who bullied him in high school by making his former tormentors (many of whom were stuck in poor, dead end jobs similar to Al's) grovel for bank loans, which he flatly refuses. Steve eventually gets a job as dean of Bud's college by blackmailing the man who employed Steve as a chauffeur.

Steve was written out of the show in the middle of the fourth season. Garrison had decided he no longer wanted to be tied down to a weekly television series, preferring to avoid being typecast in one role and devote more time to his first love: stage acting. He reached an agreement with Fox to buy out the remainder of his contract. In the final episode shot (though, confusingly, not the final episode aired) in which he was a regular character, Steve is disenchanted with his and Marcy's yuppie lifestyle, and is increasingly interested in becoming an outdoorsman (a real-life interest of Garrison's). He then disappears, with the explanation that he left Marcy to become a forest ranger at Yosemite National Park.

Prior to disappearing, he loses his job at the bank after, in an effort to win a free trip to Hawaii, he approves a loan for Al's "shoe hotline" project which fails. His last job is as a "pooper scooper" at an exotic pet shop. In later seasons, Garrison would reprise the Steve Rhoades character on four occasions, returning to guest star in individual episodes (with Steve having pursued other careers in the meantime). He eventually returns to professional life to become the dean of Bud's college. This episode was to be the pilot of a spin-off series that never happened.

In the sixth-season episode "The Egg and I", Steve returns to Chicago in an attempt to reclaim his old life and settle back into the yuppie lifestyle with Marcy. However, after learning that she has remarried to Jefferson, he confronts the Bundys for not telling him about it. Soon, the FBI is on to Steve as he stole a rare egg that belongs to Yosemite, and the Bundy family harbors him.

In the seventh season episode "Peggy and the Pirates", Peggy narrates her own pirate fantasy. Steve plays the villainous ruler of the sea "Rubio the Cruel".

Steve returned in the ninth-season episode "Get the Dodge out of Hell" as a rich career man. But, on the closing scenes of the episode, it is revealed that he's a limo driver. At the end of the season, Steve has a new job as the dean of Bud's college, Trumaine.

=== Jefferson D'Arcy ===
Jefferson Milhouse D'Arcy (Ted McGinley) is Marcy's second husband (original age unknown, but younger than Marcy; in reality, Bearse and McGinley are the same age), a "pretty boy" who marries her for her money. Self-centered and lazy, he is a male equivalent of Peg. Jefferson gives advice to Kelly and Bud about their problems more than Al does. Meanwhile, the French-hating Al never catches-on that Jefferson's surname—D'Arcy—is French.

Marcy met Jefferson after a bankers' convention when she got drunk, and found herself married to him the next morning; she was horrified to find out that her name was now Marcy D'Arcy (Episode 92, "Married...With Who"). He is Al's closest friend, and often angers Marcy when he is bonding with him; unlike Steve who was more of a foil, or straight man, to Al.

Jefferson tends to be very encouraging and attuned to Al's behavior. Marcy constantly bosses Jefferson around to keep him in check. However, behind her back Jefferson often insults Marcy and ignores her demands. When Marcy's favorite squirrel Zippy dies, Jefferson tells her that he will give it a proper burial, only to punt it out of his sight when Marcy turns around.

Jefferson is a member of "No Ma'am" along with Al, wearing the trademark T-shirt, but he always keeps a clean "Yes Ma'am" T-shirt on underneath, which he quickly reveals if Marcy is about to bust one of "No Ma'am"'s activities. He seems very afraid of provoking his wife's anger, and his fear is justified—in one episode, after he angers Marcy, she kicks him in the behind so hard he has to go to the hospital to get her boot removed from his rectum. But in spite of his fear of her wrath, he constantly engages in activities that he surely knows she would not approve of.

Marcy constantly hounds Jefferson to get a job. However, on the rare occasions when he actually gets one (working at the shoe store, being cast as an actor in a commercial, working as a bartender, working as an aerobics instructor, working at an auto repair shop in some menial position, etc.), he usually ends up working with beautiful women, which prompts a jealous Marcy to make him quit and return to his de facto job as her gigolo. This tendency runs in the D'Arcy family, as Jefferson's father also worked as a gigolo, and his mother worked as an exotic dancer before she was eaten by her snake at an airport. Jefferson and Steve don't like each other for personal reasons, stemming from "The Egg & I".

He is easily the most financially scheming character of the show—even more than the Bundys. Often, when Al stumbles into a unique lucrative opportunity, Jefferson typically persuades Al to take advantage of it. When Al is robbed in his shoe store, Jefferson convinces him to sue the mall while feigning psychological trauma. When Al discovers hidden shoes that he stocked away in the 1970s, Jefferson convinces him to use the shoes as a new gimmick for the store by taking advantage of the old shoes' popularity.

When he discovers that Al's boss Gary is using illegal sweatshops to manufacture the shoes, Jefferson assists Al in a search for incriminating evidence. When Bud is involved in a romantic relationship with the (surprising to the characters) female Gary (Janet Carroll), Jefferson convinced Al to permit the relationship, so Al can milk Gary out of her money through his son.

After discovering that they are in possession of private pictures of Shannon Tweed in sexually provocative manners, Jefferson convinces Al to sell them to the media. During a rare time in which Al is struck with good luck, Jefferson persuades him into playing in a high-stakes poker game with a group of ex-criminals. Jefferson also convinces Al to go home (and be intimate with his wife) so Al can win a radio contest.

During the course of the series, it is revealed that Jefferson spent time in prison for selling contaminated land as a vacation spot to several people, including Al. He also used to be in the CIA, and still has connections there. For example, he is able to go to Cuba and meet Fidel Castro to get a part for Al's Dodge and gets No Ma'am a meeting in front of Congress about the cancellation of "Psycho Dad".

In one episode that aired in 1994 ("The D'Arcy Files"), a man approaches Al in his shoe shop to inform him that Jefferson is in fact an ex-spy, and offers Al a hefty reward for turning him in (which he does not take). After Jefferson tells Al it was all a practical joke, saying, "If I were really a spy, I wouldn't have to worry about you turning me in; I could just have the guy whacked." Moments later, an announcer on a baseball game in the background screams that the man in question just "fell out of his booster box." Jefferson looks menacingly at the camera just before the credits roll.

Occasionally, people claim to have seen him on The Love Boat and Happy Days (a reference to McGinley having starred in both shows towards the end of their original broadcast runs), but Jefferson always denies this.

Ted McGinley had appeared previously as Peg's husband, Mr. Norman Jablonski, in the second part of "It's a Bundyful Life" where Al's guardian angel (Sam Kinison) shows Al what his family would have become if he was never born. The episode parodies Capra's It's a Wonderful Life.

=== Buck ===
Buck (played by Michael, trained by Steven Ritt) was the first family dog, a Briard (ironically a French breed of dog for the French-hating Al). Voice-over by writer/producer Kevin Curran, who appeared briefly onscreen during the end sequence of the sixth-season episode "Psychic Avengers" where Buck is turned into a human. In some episodes, Buck is voiced by Cheech Marin. From season eight on, Buck's voice was provided by staff member Kim Weiskopf.

He is often "heard" by the audience through voice-overs that tell what is on his mind. Like the human Bundys, he is just as lazy, insulting and sarcastic to the rest of the family, making snide remarks about Kelly's intelligence and Bud's inability to find a date. In spite of this, Peg dotes on him, sometimes even cooking for him. Though extremely lazy, Buck has a huge, insatiable sexual appetite, having at one point impregnated all the female dogs in the neighborhood.

Buck died at one point in the series to allow Michael, the dog that portrayed him, to retire. Buck went to animal heaven, and was reincarnated as Lucky, an American Cocker Spaniel (having met God in heaven, who turned out to be a cat). In later seasons, Buck/Lucky would occasionally serve as the narrator in the second half of a two-part episode, recapping the events of the first part.

Buck's last episode, 10.03, "Requiem for a Dead Briard" - originally broadcast on October 1, 1995 - ends with the following message on the screen: "Dedicated to Buck the Dog who with this episode begins a well earned retirement and hopefully a nice gig at stud. We'll miss you, Buddy, lift a leg. - The Producers."

Retired at the age of twelve-and-a-half, Michael died shortly afterward, on May 28, 1996, at the age of thirteen.

==== Lucky ====
A character whose voice-overs were performed by staff member Kim Weiskopf, Lucky is the reincarnation of Buck, who was punished in the afterlife for being a bad dog his entire life by being forced to spend another lifetime as the Bundys' family dog. Miraculously appearing out of thin air in the Bundys' living room shortly after Buck's death, the family is happy to have a new family pet, although Lucky is horrified that he has to spend yet another lifetime with the terrible family. Lucky is a Cocker Spaniel.

Unlike his last incarnation Buck who was heterosexual, Lucky himself is gay having on two occasions been attracted to males: once to an English Bulldog that wore a leather jacket and spikes that he met at a park, and also to Jefferson when he was in a wool sheep costume. Lucky also dismissed a female dog when he was set up on a date with her.

== Recurring characters ==
=== Peggy's family ===
- Florence "Flo" Wanker, heard only in voice-overs by Kathleen Freeman and ground-shaking gags (making her an unseen character), lives with the Bundys in Season 10 after separating from Peggy's father. There are vague and comical references to her gigantic weight, which is alleged to be more than 1,000 pounds (450 kg). This woman is mostly the victim of Al's abrasive, behind-the-back insults. Originally, she was supposed to be played by Divine.
- Ephraim Wanker, Peggy's father, was played by Tim Conway, appearing occasionally in the last three seasons. He calls Peggy by her full name, "Margaret". Unlike many other sitcoms with the father-in-law usually disapproving of the husband who married his daughter, Peggy's father approves of Al so much that he held a gun to Al's head to force him to follow through on the marriage. Al had drunkenly proposed to Peggy, although Ephraim implied in "The Joke's on Al" that the gun was not loaded at the time. Ephraim, like his wife, was set to be played by Divine, who died before production. Unlike Al, he finally divorces his wife and begins dating a younger woman.
- The Wankers – Peggy's family, living in Wanker County ("The home of the big gassy possum"), a fictional Wisconsin county. They are more often mentioned than seen on camera. Other extended family members who have appeared on the show include Uncle Otto (James "Gypsy" Haake), Uncle Irwin (King Kong Bundy), the Wanker Triplets (Milly de Rubio, Elena de Rubio, Eadie de Rubio), Cousin Possum Boy (John Gerard), Cousin Effie (Joey Lauren Adams), Cousin Eb (William Sanderson), Cousin Zemus (Bobcat Goldthwait) and his wife Cousin Ida Mae (Linda Blair), along with their six-and-a-half-year-old son, Seven (Shane Sweet). When Peggy hears Al encouraging Kelly to get a job, she mentions a tradition of the female Wankers of having men being buried earlier for having to keep them. Mostly in the seventh season, The Bundys took care of Seven, but he disappeared midway through the season, due to the character's negative reception, with no on-screen explanation given.

=== Members of NO MA'AM / Al's friends ===
- Bob Rooney (E. E. Bell) – One of Al's friends from the neighborhood, and treasurer of "NO MA'AM." He works as a butcher, has a wife named Louise (who is a friend of Peggy's), and played on the same football team as Al at Polk High. He is always called by both his first and last name, even by his wife, and it is spelled as one word on his bowling shirt.
- Officer Dan (Dan Tullis, Jr.) – A friend of Al's who is also in "NO MA'AM" and works full-time as a Chicago uniformed police officer. Surprisingly, though he is part of "NO MA'AM," he often arrests them for their illegal antics and tries to keep them out of trouble. However, he does admit to his friends that he is a corrupt officer, which indicates he does help out the group now and then. In one of the times he was about to arrest them, he changes his mind and joins them when he learns they're trying to bring back "Psycho Dad". Though he was usually a cop, in season 6 Officer Dan arrives at the Bundy front door as an FBI agent looking for Steve Rhoades.
- Ike (Tom McCleister) – Another member of "NO MA'AM" and another friend of Al's. He is the Sergeant at Arms of the organization. He works as an auto mechanic and has a wife named Frannie (also a friend of Peggy's). Somewhat insecure, he believes Elvis is still alive. The character was named after producer Kim Weiskopf's best friends's son.
- Barney (Steve Susskind) – A friend of Al's who appeared as early as Episode 8 ("The Poker Game") and occasionally thereafter, up until the foundation of "NO MA'AM." Steve Susskind made one subsequent appearance in the 8th season (as Stan) in "The Legend of Ironhead Haynes."

=== Al's co-workers at Gary's Shoes ===
- Gary (Janet Carroll) is the owner of Gary's Shoes and employer of Al. Gary's first appearance in the series came in Season 9 after Al turned her women's shoe store into a men's, assuming Gary was male and therefore would not notice. (Al never saw Gary in the first twenty years he worked in the store, leading him once to doubt that Gary really existed.) Gary is incredibly wealthy (she would have been in the Forbes 400, but only reached #401 because of the shoe store - her only failing business venture). In her first appearance she says she owns, among other things, men, prompting Al to offer himself; she then points out that she said "men." Over the course of the series she makes several more appearances, always to the chagrin of Al. In one episode, Al discovered that Gary gets her shoes manufactured through a sweatshop within the city. Al tried to expose Gary but was unsuccessful. In another episode, Gary briefly dated Bud. Mostly Gary considers firing Al, and she came close a lot of times. She usually makes him suffer by being a women's shoe salesman and chews him out regarding why he hasn't made any sales. In God Help Ye Married Bundymen, Gary finally fires Al and Griff and replacing them with Biff and Hal. However, she rehires them after Hal and Biff became afraid of their future lives as shoe salesmen, married to gold-digging wives and dealing with customer complaints.
- Luke Ventura (Ritch Shydner) – A coworker at the shoe store early in the series in Season 1. He was a sly womanizer who was always seducing beautiful women and stealing Al's sales. Peggy hated him while Al tolerated him. He disappears from the show after the first season, but is mentioned again in the ninth-season episode "Pump Fiction," when Al learns from the shoe industry publication "Shoe News" that Luke is being given an award. Though he was portrayed to be a friend of Al's in the beginning of the series, after his disappearance, he had been spoken of as if he had since become Al's rival. Meanwhile, Peggy spoke respectfully of him as well.
- Aaron Mitchell (Hill Harper) – The second coworker of Al's at the shoe store. A young football star at Polk High, he is on the verge of marrying a wonderful woman and going to college, achieving everything that Al ever wanted. Al chooses to live his life vicariously through Aaron, until his misguided advice accidentally drives the boy to a shrewish woman named "Meg" (a young copy of Peg) and the same dismal fate which had befallen Al. Aaron appeared only in the eighth season (5 episodes).
- Dexter (Chi McBride) – He was the third coworker with Al in Gary's Shoes who appeared in one episode. He was injured and almost killed when a fat woman fell on him during a shoe fitting.
- Griff (Harold Sylvester) - First appears early in Season 9, and is a friend and coworker of Al at the shoe store. He is also a member of Al's "NO MA'AM" organization. A divorcee, he shares many of Al's characteristics as far as work ethic and views on women go. However, Griff is not quite as impolite and outspoken to their customers or to their boss, Gary. Just like Jefferson or Steve Rhodes, he is also the straight man in Al's antics and schemes. He is also less callous; occasionally he feels uneasy when going along with one of Al or Jefferson's many schemes. Griff drives a GEO Metro with vanity plates reading 'PO BOY', and is often mocked for this. However, Griff is happy because it is still more reliable than Al's 1970s Dodge (and is easier to push uphill), though Griff did mention a fond memory of being a passenger in the Dodge, while he and Al tried to run over Griff's ex-wife (she was able to outrun the Dodge). Griff's first appearance was in the episode "Naughty But Niece" when Bud goes to the shoe store, he first meets Griff who introduces himself claiming that Al recently hired him. Bud says Al never mentioned having a co-worker, and Griff says that Al never mentioned having a son, a daughter, or a living wife, but had already annoyed him with all the times he mentioned scoring four touchdowns in one football game. Unlike Al, he is very successful with hot women.

=== Other recurring characters ===
- Miranda Veracruz de la Jolla Cardinal (Teresa Parente) - Latina local news reporter originally from Ecuador whose catchphrase is simply saying her name. She is typically assigned to cover the pathetic news stories in which the Bundys inevitably involve themselves. She often laments the sad state of her career while on the air.
- Vinnie Verducci (Matt LeBlanc) – One of Kelly's boyfriends and the son of one of Al's buddies, Vinnie costs Al his prized television set in a fight, but makes it up to him by consenting to his father's scheme to crash high society and bag a rich wife. He also invests in and briefly appears on Kelly's public-access talk show. The character appears in the short-lived Married... with Children spin-offs titled Top of the Heap and Vinnie & Bobby.
- Ariel (Jennifer Lyons) – One of Bud's love interests who appeared in Seasons 9 and 10. She is the quintessential dumb blonde, sporting blonde hair, large breasts, skimpy outfits and a high-pitched voice. She is not very smart and Bud is constantly thinking of new ways to con her into having sex with him.
- Psycho Dad (Andrew Prine) – A fictitious character and television show on Fox, that Al and the members of "NO MA'AM" (except for Griff) idolize. The show was abruptly cancelled after complaints from women's group due to its high content of violence. "NO MA'AM" went to Washington, D.C., to have "Psycho Dad" put back on the air but were unsuccessful. In one episode, Peg watched a similar show called "Psycho Mom", possibly a spin-off. Psycho Dad reads Al's letter and decides to renounce and cancel "Psycho Dad" for good. He has a new TV series that he is starring in with a seven-figure salary and tells Al to get help.
- Shoe Woman (Mary-Pat Green): A recurring character who has a masculine appearance. Though only in a handful of episodes, this character is well known for her phrase, "I need shoes!". In season nine it is revealed that she works at the bowling alley Al and his friends go to on a Thursday, making a humorous variation of her catchphrase, "You need shoes!", to a barefoot Al. The catchphrase is said in a fast-paced, masculine voice. The same actress appears in the episode "Kelly Knows Something" as "Max", another game show contestant.
- Miss Hardaway (Beverly Archer) is a counselor at Bud's college who has a rather creepy infatuation with him. She first appears as the founder of a virgin hotline (1-800-ZIPP-UP) who hires Bud as a counselor. Later she is the school librarian, who spies on Bud and arranges it so he's masturbating in a private study room.
- Seven (Shane Sweet) Peggy's cousins (played by Bobcat Goldthwait and Linda Blair) drop off their six-year-old son and leave him behind for the Bundys to take care of. His parents explain that his name comes from the fact that they had "one, two, three, four, five, seven kids." He appeared on the seventh season of Married... with Children in a handful of episodes, then disappeared without any explanation other than a quick mention by the D'Arcys, who claim that he has turned up in their house and will not leave. They consider renaming him, and possibly begin taking care of him, but that's the last time he is mentioned by another character. His last episode was in Peggy and the Pirates (episode 7.18) and after that, no one noticed he was gone. He was an extremely unpopular character with the fans. Seven's picture was shown twice more, both times in Season 8. In Ride Scare (episode 8.22), a guest holds up a carton of milk with a picture of Seven headed "Missing". This moment was ranked 73rd in TV Guide and TV Land's The 100 Most Unexpected TV Moments. The last reference to Seven was in Kelly Knows Something (episode 8.26) while Kelly is cramming for a quiz-show appearance. At some point, information entering one ear is balanced by information leaving her other ear, including a picture of Seven.
- Shirley (Diana Bellamy) is a recurring fat customer at Gary's Shoe Store who first appeared in the pilot. She was offended by Al for getting her the wrong shoe size when she claimed she wears a size 7 shoe. Al insulted her more when her son, Arnold, asked him for a balloon and he was told he had one (meaning Arnold's mother). Shirley would return in Crimes Against Obesity (episode 11.09) wanting to return a pair of shoes that Al sold her. After he offends her with another fat insult, Shirley returns with a bunch of fat women and put him on trial for his ostracism towards them with his insults.
- Matilda (Danica Sheridan) another recurring fat customer who first appeared in A Shoe Room With a View (episode 10.02). When Al insulted her after her aerobics class, Matilda is offended and leaves which causes Marcy to defend her actions. In I Can't Believe it's Butter (episode 10.14), she returns asking kindly for donations for charity and is insulted when he rudely refuses by insulting her. Matilda tells Al off that she hopes he gets coal in his stocking, which he responds that he hopes she gets Slim Fast in hers. She makes her final appearance in Crimes Against Obesity (episode 11.09).
- Amber (Juliet Tablak) is Marcy's niece who appeared in four episodes of season 9. Amber's mother sent her to live with Marcy to get her out of her bad L.A. neighborhood, just like The Fresh Prince of Bel-Air. Bud managed to get her in bed on their first encounter (and possibly more so in the following week) and tries relentlessly to get her in bed again, but is unable to do so.
- Sandy (Donna Pieroni) another overweight customer who trades barbs with Al while shopping for shoes.
