= Naughty but Nice =

Naughty but Nice may refer to:

- "Naughty but Nice", a gossip column by Rob Shuter

== Film ==
- Naughty but Nice (1927 film), a 1927 Colleen Moore comedy silent film
- Naughty but Nice (1939 film), a 1939 musical comedy starring Dick Powell

== Music ==
- Naughty but Nice (album), Sarah Connor's 2005 album
- "Naughty but Nice", a song by Room 2012 from Elevator

== See also ==
- Naughty but Mice, a 1939 cartoon by Chuck Jones
- "Naughty but Niece", an episode of Married... with Children
- Nutty but Nice, a short film starring The Three Stooges
- Naughty or Nice (disambiguation)
