= The Naked and the Dead (disambiguation) =

The Naked and the Dead is a 1948 World War II novel by Norman Mailer.

The Naked and the Dead may also refer to:

- The Naked and the Dead (film), a 1958 film adaptation of the book, starring Aldo Ray and Cliff Robertson

== Television ==
- "The Naked and the Dead", Cold Squad season 3, episode 4 (1999)
- "The Naked and the Dead", Hooperman season 1, episode 12 (1988)
- "The Naked and the Dead", Matador (American) episode 2 (2014)
- "The Naked and the Dead", St. Elsewhere season 4, episode 4 (1985)
- "The Naked and the Dead", The Rookie season 5, episode 11 (2023)

== See also ==
- "The Naked and the Dead, but Mostly the Naked", a Married… with Children episode
