= Breaking Up Is Hard to Do (disambiguation) =

"Breaking Up Is Hard to Do" is a song by Neil Sedaka.

Breaking Up Is Hard to Do may also refer to:

- Breaking Up Is Hard to Do (film), a 2010 American romantic comedy
- Breaking Up Is Hard to Do (musical), a 2006 jukebox musical
- "Breaking Up Is Hard to Do" (Degrassi High), a 1989 television episode
- "Breaking Up Is Hard to Do" (Happy Days), a 1974 television episode
- "Breaking Up Is Hard to Do" (Roseanne), a 1992 television episode
- "Breaking Up Is Hard to Do (in 22 Minutes)", a 1989 episode of Full House
- "Breaking Up Is Hard to Do", a 2002 episode of Home Movies
- "Breaking Up Is Hard to Do", a 1998 episode of Family Matters
- "Breaking Up Is Hard to Do", a 1996 episode of Hangin' with Mr. Cooper

== See also ==
- Breaking Up Is Easy to Do (disambiguation)
- "Breaking Out Is Hard to Do", an episode of Family Guy
- "Making Up Is Hard to Do," an episode of Gypsy Sisters
- "Growing Up Is Hard to Do," an episode of Step by Step
- "Making Out Is Hard to Do," an episode of Full House
