= Take My Wife =

Take My Wife can refer to several television productions, typically inspired by Henny Youngman's famous one-liner, "Take my wife, please"

- Now Take My Wife, a 1971 BBC television sitcom
- Take My Wife (1979 TV series), a 1979 British television sitcom
- "Take My Wife, Please" (Married... with Children episode), the 1993 seventh episode of the eighth season of the American sitcom Married... with Children
- "Take My Wife, Sleaze", the 1999 eighth episode of the eleventh season of the American animated sitcom The Simpsons
- "Take My Wife, Please", the 2004 thirteenth episode of the eleventh season of NYPD Blue
- "Take My Wife" (Family Guy), the 2015 eighteenth episode of the thirteenth season of the American animated sitcom Family Guy
- Take My Wife (2016 TV series), a 2016 comedy series
