= Breaking Up Is Easy to Do =

Breaking Up Is Easy to Do may refer to:

- "Breaking Up Is Easy to Do", a season 11 episode of Married... with Children
- "Breaking up is Easy to Do", a season 2 episode of Maths Mansion

== See also ==
- "Breaking Up Is Hard to Do", a song recorded by Neil Sedaka
