= Married... with Children season 7 =

1992–93 season of American TV series

Married... with Children
- Season 7
- DVD cover
- Showrunner: Ron Leavitt
- Starring: Ed O'Neill; Katey Sagal; Amanda Bearse; Christina Applegate; David Faustino; Ted McGinley
- No. of episodes: 26

Release
- Original network: Fox
- Original release: September 13, 1992 – May 23, 1993

Season chronology
- ← Previous; Season 6 Next → Season 8

This is a list of episodes for the seventh season (1992–93) of the television series Married... with Children. The season aired on Fox from September 13, 1992, to May 23, 1993.

In this season, the writers introduced Seven (played by Shane Sweet) in an attempt to give the Bundys a third child. When the audience was unreceptive, he was removed from the series with no explanation other than being left at the D'Arcys' (Seven was last seen being told a bedtime story in "Peggy and the Pirates"). There is, however, a subtle reference to him in Season 8, episode 22, when he appears as the missing child on a carton of milk. Bud also loses his virginity during this season and he makes his first appearance with a beard (which was mistaken for dirt in the episode where Bud first notices he's growing a beard). David Garrison (Steve Rhoades) also makes another guest appearance during this season, also Dan Castellaneta (not as his character on "The Dancing Show", but as a funeral parlor salesman), as does Michael Faustino.

Amanda Bearse missed two episodes this season.

This was the final season for co-creator and showrunner Ron Leavitt; fellow co-creator Michael G. Moye returned as showrunner for the following season.

== Episodes ==
No. overall	No. in season	Title	Directed by	Written by	Original release date	Prod. code	U.S. viewers (millions)
132	1	"Magnificent Seven"	Gerry Cohen	Arthur Silver	September 13, 1992	7.01	22.8
Peg's cousins Zemus and Ida Mae (guest stars Bobcat Goldthwait and Linda Blair) pay a quick visit and end up leaving behind their five-year-old son, Seven (Shane Sweet), in the Bundys' care. Peg, the only one little Seven captivates, sees him as her chance to be a "great mother," or at least try. Bud resents it the most when he has to temporarily share his bed with Seven for the night. Al eventually embarks on a road trip to look for Seven's parents to force them to take him back. But after tracking down and confronting Zemus and Ida Mae at a trailer park in northern Florida, Al returns to Chicago the following day and, for some unknown reason, somberly lies saying he was unable to find Seven's parents and reluctantly agrees to let Seven stay as part of the new addition to the Bundy family.
133	2	"T-R-A-Something-Something Spells Tramp"	Gerry Cohen	Ron Leavitt & Ellen L. Fogle	September 20, 1992	7.02	21.4
After Kelly gets ditched in the middle of nowhere by her date Ralph (guest star Corey Feldman), she soon meets two other young women who have been ditched by their dates for being tramps. Meanwhile, Al and Peg try talking to revive their waning marriage and Bud gets a date with a girl who has the measles.
134	3	"Every Bundy Has a Birthday"	Gerry Cohen	Richard Gurman	September 27, 1992	7.03	19.8
When Peg discovers that no one knows Seven's birthday, she picks a day at random... which happens to be Al's. He is understandably not pleased when he has lost his birthday to the new kid. The Bundys try to celebrate Seven's sixth birthday at a local park, but they all must face off against a snooty rich family who has rented the entire park to have a birthday party for their son.
135	4	"Al on the Rocks"	Gerry Cohen	Andrew Smith	October 4, 1992	7.04	22.2
Peg coddles a sick Seven and kicks everyone out of the house who may be a threat to him. To pay for Seven's doctor bill, Al becomes a bartender at a topless bar, where the bartender is the one who's topless. When Jefferson covers for Al for one day, he ends up taking over Al's new job for himself.
136	5	"What I Did for Love"	Gerry Cohen	Ellen L. Fogle	October 11, 1992	7.05	20.7
Peg buys a multitude of sexy dresses to entice Al (who just wants a steak dinner). Meanwhile, Bud begins loitering around in a women's lingerie store and Kelly gives Peg some advice.
137	6	"Frat Chance"	Gerry Cohen	Larry Jacobson	October 25, 1992	7.06	19.0
Bud starts a fraternity with his friends so they can score with women, with little success. Meanwhile, Marcy is upset that Jefferson wants to go to his old college fraternity, so Al, Peggy, Marcy and Jefferson try to find a movie to watch.
138	7	"The Chicago Wine Party"	Gerry Cohen	Stacie Lipp	November 1, 1992	7.07	14.3
On Election Day, the Bundys get political when Al protests against a two-cent beer tax.
139	8	"Kelly Doesn't Live Here Anymore"	Amanda Bearse	Gabrielle Topping	November 8, 1992	7.08	18.5
Kelly gets a job as a diner waitress, which upsets Peg, who raised her daughter to get by in life on her looks instead of having to work. In spite of the initial hitches, Kelly starts doing the job well and even grows to like her job. Michael Faustino guest stars. Note: Amanda Bearse does not appear in this episode.
140	9	"Rock of Ages"	Gerry Cohen	Al Aidekman	November 15, 1992	7.09	14.8
Al enters and wins a shoe selling contest, which wins him a trip to Hawaii, which the family turns into four stand-by tickets. Things soon take a turn when the Bundys end up sneaking into the first-class airport lounge while posing as rock stars and meet many other famous rock stars. Guest stars: Spencer Davis, Mark Goodman, Richie Havens, Robby Krieger, Mark Lindsay, Peter Noone, and John Sebastian.
141	10	"Death of a Shoe Salesman"	Gerry Cohen	Stacie Lipp	November 22, 1992	7.10	20.0
Al buys a cemetery plot next to his favorite Western star. Peg decides to get a plot near him, but when it gets too expensive, she finds a better solution. Meanwhile, Seven has moved in with Marcy and Jefferson. Guest stars: Dan Castellaneta.
142	11	"Old College Try"	Gerry Cohen	Story by : P. Sharon; Teleplay by : Diane Burroughs & Joey Gutierrez	December 13, 1992	7.11	16.8
Bud receives a $25,000 grant for college and prepares to move out. Al and Peggy discover the money and, believing it to be a bank error in their favor, immediately withdraw and spend it as fast as they can, leaving Bud penniless.
143	12	"Christmas"	Gerry Cohen	Ellen L. Fogle	December 20, 1992	7.12	19.1
While at a bar containing deadbeat Santa Claus bums, Al reminisces about his past Christmases with his family. When he is forced to get gifts, he takes up several part-time jobs, including one playing Santa Claus at the local mall. But in the end, Al ends up giving the family gifts consisting of items taken from Ray's Bar when his wallet is stolen.
144	13	"The Wedding Show"	Gerry Cohen	Arthur Silver	January 10, 1993	7.13	19.1
While preparing to go to a relative's wedding, Bud has sex with the bride (Joey Lauren Adams) — whose groom is a big, angry man (Cousin Jimmy, who will appear in episode 25 of this season); Kelly spends time with the bridesmaids to color coordinate; and Al impatiently waits for Peg to find the right wedding attire.
145	14	"It Doesn't Get Any Better Than This"	Sam W. Orender	Michael G. Moye	January 24, 1993	7.14	19.4
Peggy and Marcy ruin Al's fishing trip by tagging along with him and constantly fighting with each other. Meanwhile, Jefferson and the kids, Kelly, Bud and Seven, spend Marcy's money on food, massages and women.
146	15	"Heels on Wheels"	Gerry Cohen	Stacie Lipp	February 7, 1993	7.15	18.8
Al has a crisis of sexuality when a pretty shoe store customer turns out to be a man. Meanwhile, Kelly buys a motorcycle so she can put some fun back in her life, but Peg wants the motor for sexual reasons and Al wants the bike so he can feel like a man again.
147	16	"Mr. Empty Pants"	Gerry Cohen	George Tricker	February 14, 1993	7.16	15.7
Peggy becomes famous for her cartoon drawing of Al called "Mr. Empty Pants". However, when Al gets selected for the centerfold of Playgirl, Peg gets jealous.
148	17	"You Can't Miss"	Amanda Bearse	Joel Valentincic & Scott Zimbler	February 21, 1993	7.17	20.5
Bud appears on a Dating Game-style game show — hosted by Bill Maher — to win the affection of a girl (Chantel Dubay) who would rather date the show's hunk than Bud. Meanwhile, Al and Peg fight in a battle of wills over who will fall asleep first, and Kelly thinks there's a conspiracy against her when she confuses one day for another.
149	18	"Peggy and the Pirates"	Gerry Cohen	Richard Gurman	February 28, 1993	7.18	20.2
Peggy tells Seven a bedtime story of love and blood on the high seas (with the Bundys, the D'Arcys, and Marcy's ex-husband Steve as pirates). Note: This is Seven's last appearance in the series.
150	19	"Go for the Old"	Gerry Cohen	Stacie Lipp	March 14, 1993	7.19	18.4
When Peg gets Al a senior discount on a movie ticket, Al decides to get a senior discount card and abuse all the benefits that come with being over 65 – including competing in a local Olympics for the elderly.
151	20	"Un-Alful Entry"	Amanda Bearse	Larry Jacobson	March 28, 1993	7.20	17.4
A burglar (guest star Randall "Tex" Cobb) breaks into the Bundy house, only to be fondled by Al who mistakes him for Peggy in the dark. The burglar objects and threatens Al, who realizes his mistake and attacks the burglar, subduing him. Al is briefly a neighborhood hero, but soon finds himself on the receiving end of the burglar's personal-injury lawsuit. Note: Amanda Bearse does not appear in this episode.
152	21	"Movie Show"	Gerry Cohen	Ellen L. Fogle	April 11, 1993	7.21	16.5
Al's scheme to get everyone out of doing something for Kelly's birthday backfires when she chooses to break off a date with her boyfriend and go to the movies with the family. But at the cinema, Kelly becomes angry and jealous when she sees her boyfriend Frank (guest star David Boreanaz) in the theater with another woman.
153	22	"'Til Death Do Us Part"	Gerry Cohen	Stacie Lipp	April 25, 1993	7.22	16.0
Al's lack of performance in the bedroom makes him the laughingstock of the town, so Al sets his mind on getting back in shape by setting up a gym for himself in the Bundys basement.
154	23	"Tis Time to Smell the Roses"	Gerry Cohen	Kevin Curran	May 2, 1993	7.23	15.0
Al plans on retiring early, but Peggy spends too much money shopping and he must get a job at Homeplate Athletic Shoes. Al tries to buy it, but fails thanks to Peg. Al then buys lottery tickets with the rest of the money ($6,000), but loses and ends up in his old job. Charlene Tilton makes a cameo promoting the abdominizer.
155	24	"Old Insurance Dodge"	Gerry Cohen	Larry Jacobson	May 9, 1993	7.24	14.2
Al tries to scam the insurance company when the Dodge is stolen, borrowing cars from dealers to "check it out" and drives around cool cars. Finally when the insurance money turns up, the stolen car is also found.
156	25	"Wedding Repercussions"	Gerry Cohen	Arthur Silver	May 16, 1993	7.25	17.7
Following the events from "The Wedding Show," cousin Jimmy returns to find out who slept with his wife before the wedding. Al gives a scared Bud some advice and Kelly threatens to tell Jimmy the truth.
157	26	"The Proposition"	Gerry Cohen	Arthur Silver	May 23, 1993	7.26	16.0
Al's old girlfriend Coco (played by Wheel of Fortune's Vanna White) wants to buy Al from Peggy for $500,000. This makes Peg realize how much she really loves her husband, forcing her to choose between her marriage and the money.
