= Married... with Children season 10 =

1995–96 season of American TV series

Married... with Children
- Season 10
- DVD cover
- Showrunners: Richard Gurman; Kim Weiskopf
- Starring: Ed O'Neill; Katey Sagal; Amanda Bearse; Christina Applegate; David Faustino; Ted McGinley
- No. of episodes: 26, plus 1 special

Release
- Original network: Fox
- Original release: September 17, 1995 – May 19, 1996

Season chronology
- ← Previous; Season 9 Next → Season 11

This is a list of episodes for the tenth season (1995–96) of the television series Married... with Children. The season aired on Fox from September 17, 1995, to May 19, 1996.

The tenth season had the death of family pet Buck and his subsequent reincarnation into the body of Lucky, the Bundys' next dog. The season also marks the first appearances of Peggy's father Ephraim (played by Tim Conway) and Peggy's mother, who moves in with the Bundys (although she is never seen, only heard). Also, Peg leaves Al and goes on a search for her father.

Katey Sagal missed seven episodes and made short appearances in three episodes. Amanda Bearse also missed three episodes.

Episode 22 "Enemies" was a back-door spin-off pilot that was not picked up.

This is the only season for Richard Gurman and Kim Weiskopf as showrunners.

== Episodes ==
No. overall	No. in season	Title	Directed by	Written by	Original release date	Prod. code	U.S. viewers (millions)
210	1	"Guess Who's Coming to Breakfast, Lunch and Dinner"	Gerry Cohen	Russell Marcus	September 17, 1995	1002	15.5
Al is excited when Bud decides to move out after he is embarrassed by his parents while he is with a girl. He is a bit disappointed when Bud moves back into the basement, and horrified when Peg's mother comes to live with them after splitting up with Peg's father. He goes to Wanker County to convince Peg's father to patch up with his wife.
211	2	"A Shoe Room with a View"	Gerry Cohen	Richard Gurman & Stacie Lipp	September 24, 1995	1001	13.4
Al suggests an aerobics studio be built next to the shoe store so he and his NO MA'AM buddies can peep in on the women exercising, but Al gets more than he can handle when the women turn out to be fat. Meanwhile, Bud loses his job at the DMV for being a competent employee.
212	3	"Requiem for a Dead Briard"	Gerry Cohen	Michael G. Moye	October 1, 1995	1003	13.3
Kelly is upset over losing Buck the dog, but Al is more upset over having to spend money on a new pet just to make his daughter happy. Meanwhile, Buck's fate to be reincarnated as an eagle is on the line when he discovers that his judge is a cat and his defense attorney is a rat. Note: This episode marks the final appearance of Buck and the first appearance of Lucky the dog. Guest stars: Ben Stein and Don Novello as his character, Father Guido Sarducci
213	4	"Reverend Al"	Gerry Cohen	Kim Weiskopf	October 8, 1995	1004	12.0
Al turns NO MA'AM into a church so he can gain tax-exempt status.
214	5	"How Bleen Was My Kelly"	Amanda Bearse	Daniel O'Keefe	October 15, 1995	1005	12.3
To prepare for her role as Marie Curie in a made-for-TV movie, Kelly poses as a scientist on a grant from Crayola to invent a new color she calls "Bleen" and mixes a biohazardous chemical as part of her cover, which she brings home to hide in Al's shower, where she thinks it will be safe. Al, however, just happens to be taking his bi-monthly shower and uses it, believing it is regular shampoo, but it ends up vigorously regrowing his hair. Its unfortunate side effect is that it makes him and the other members of NO MA'AM who are testing it more attentive to their women, so Al begs Kelly to make an antidote. She returns to the lab and experiments on Bud till she finds it. Peg tries to find a person who makes less money than Al using the computer, and finds herself. Note: Amanda Bearse does not appear in this episode.
215	6	"The Weaker Sex"	Amanda Bearse	Dvora Inwood	October 22, 1995	1006	9.7
Al mocks Marcy and Peg for taking a self-defense class, but when a potential thief goes after Al's wallet, Peg punches him and becomes the hero.
216	7	"Flight of the Bumblebee"	Gerry Cohen	Calvin Brown, Jr.	October 29, 1995	1007	17.7
To earn his membership into NO MA'AM, Bud must take a photo of himself with wrestler King Kong Bundy. With Kelly's help, he gets near King Kong dressed as a bee, but due to Kelly's foolishness, he ends up in the fighting ring.
217	8	"Blond and Blonder"	Gerry Cohen	Stacie Lipp & Richard Gurman	November 5, 1995	1008	15.1
Kelly and her best friends meet at the Bundy house and reminisce how mean they were to nerds. Bud also gets teased, but a girl with braces named Mindy has the hots for him. But at their five-year high-school reunion, they compete for the rich nerd, Eric, whom Kelly teased in high school. Bud and Eric get together and take revenge. Meanwhile, Marcy's bank holds a "Guns for Toys" drive and the Bundy’s and the D'Arcy's end up playing Twister. Jefferson ends up blowing up Mr. Potato Head with fireworks.
218	9	"The Two that Got Away"	Amanda Bearse	Al Aidekman	November 19, 1995	1011	13.5
Al and Jefferson's fishing lodge is taken away by Shannon Tweed, and Jefferson plots revenge. When they realize that they unknowingly took a nude picture of Shannon Tweed and some guy, they try to make a small fortune. Kelly and Bud try to get Lucky a part in a dog-food commercial.
219	10	"Dud Bowl II"	Gerry Cohen	Kim Weiskopf	November 26, 1995	1009	11.6
Marcy tries to do her best to stop her bank from dedicating a scoreboard at Polk High to Al by getting Terry Bradshaw to usurp the honor. Al makes a plan to sabotage the event with Bud and Jefferson's help. Kelly decides to help Al by speaking to Terry, and he agrees to help her.
—	—	"Special: Al Bundy's Sports Spectacular"	William Brown	Paul Wales	November 26, 1995	—	9.2
Roy Firestone hosts a clip show episode of Married... With Children featuring the show's greatest sporting moments.
220	11	"Bearly Men"	Gerry Cohen	Russell Marcus	December 3, 1995	1010	15.3
To get rid of Peg's mother, Al tries to prove himself to Peg's father and then convince him to come and take her. On Bud's suggestion, Bud and he go bear hunting with Peg's dad and get abandoned there. They accidentally knock out a bear and bring Peg's dad to Chicago, assuming that it is dead. The bear runs away and raids Marcy and Jefferson's car. So, Peg's dad leaves Peg's mom behind to find the bear. Al and Bud help.
221	12	"Love Conquers Al"	Amanda Bearse	Paul Corrigan & Brad Walsh	December 10, 1995	1013	13.2
At Jefferson and Marcy's suggestion, Al, Peggy, and her parents go to a marriage retreat/water park to get her parents back together. Peg's father runs away with another man's wife on a world tour. Meanwhile, Kelly dates a Hispanic man, named Carlos, who will not put out, while Bud dates the man's sexually excited cousin Esmeralda.
222	13	"I Can't Believe It's Butter"	Sam W. Orender	Scott Zimbler & Joel Valentincic	December 17, 1995	1012	13.2
Kelly and Bud decide to earn their own Christmas gift money. Al's friends get addicted to calling a woman named Butter at a 1-900 phone sex line, but Al finds out that the woman is Peg's mother. With the money she earns, she buys all a nice Christmas dinner. So Al decides to keep this a secret from NO MA'AM, but when Griff falls in love with her, Al makes a plan.
223	14	"The Hood, the Bud and the Kelly: Part 1"	Gerry Cohen	Dvora Inwood	January 7, 1996	1014	15.7
Part one of two. When Kelly gives her agent, Bud, an ultimatum, he tries to get new clients. When that fails, too, Bud borrows money from a mob-connected businessman, named Vito (Perry Anzilotti), for Kelly's exercise video, but when she has a disagreement with the male lead in the video Raphael (John Carlos Frey), the mob says they will kill Bud if the video is not finished. Peggy convinces Al to get a satellite dish. Al and Jefferson try to install it themselves.
224	15	"The Hood, the Bud and the Kelly: Part 2"	Gerry Cohen	Dan O'Keefe	January 14, 1996	1015	12.6
Conclusion. Bud tries his best to shoot the exercise video, but keeps failing with both Kelly and her male lead's constant arguing. Bud is threatened by Vito's hulking henchman Gino (Richard Moll) to finish the video by 5:00 pm, or Bud will be killed. Finally, Bud plays both the music and succeeds in making a video, but lands in more trouble when Bud inadvertently videotapes Gino talking with another mob hitman (J. J. Johnston) about the location of a murdered mob rival. Meanwhile, Peggy and Marcy make money by placing bets on which husband will fall off the roof while Al, Jefferson, Griff, Ike, Bob Rooney and Officer Dan continue trying to install the satellite dish. Finally, the men decide to just stay up on the roof and hide from their wives.
225	16	"Calendar Girl"	Amanda Bearse	Fran E. Kaufer	February 4, 1996	1016	14.1
Al convinces Bud to make a calendar with beautiful women for his school project to win a rivalry with a competing shoe store owner (Victor Raider-Wexler) and his son (John Patrick White). Everything goes well until Bud finds and hires a new model named Crystal Clark (Krista Allen), whom no one has ever heard of, to appear on the front cover as the latest newcomer model. For some unknown reason, Crystal refuses to pose. Bud must try to convince Crystal to model to make the calendar complete as well as offering her a percentage of the sales that the calendars will bring. Crystal finally agrees to pose and completes the calendar. Later at the end, Crystal is interviewed on TV, where she admits that not only is Bud a great kisser, but also that the modelling project boosted her self-esteem, and now she has something important to say that Bud is convinced will be a marriage proposal. While everyone is watching the interview at home, Bud gets down on his knees in front of the TV and says 'yes' just before she tells the truth about who she really is: a woman... who was born as a man. At the same time, Peggy leaves home to try to search for her missing father. Note: Katey Sagal makes a short appearance due to her pregnancy. Amanda Bearse does not appear in this episode.
226	17	"The Agony and the Extra C"	Sam W. Orender	Jimmy Aleck & Jim Keily	February 11, 1996	1019	15.2
Bud and Kelly visit Jefferson in the hospital, who tells them the story of how he got there. For his anniversary, Marcy wants him to be away from Al, but he goes to the Nudie Bar with them to see the Mexican babes. He gets delayed there, and based on a stripper's suggestion, he decides to get a tattoo from a drunk guy at the Nudie Bar, but it ends up misspelled ("I Love Mary"). After getting someone else to fix it, the tattoo ends up reading “I Love Marty.” Meanwhile, Peggy is revealed to be in Paris, France looking for her missing father. Note: Katey Sagal makes a short appearance due to her pregnancy.
227	18	"Spring Break: Part 1"	Gerry Cohen	Kim Weiskopf	February 18, 1996	1017	14.0
Part one of two. During spring break, Kelly and her friends seduce Bud and his friends out of their airline tickets and hotel reservations at Fort Lauderdale. Al, Jefferson, and Griff soon follow to judge a bikini contest. When Marcy sees Jefferson and Al on a spring-break TV special, she heads out to Fort Lauderdale with Bud and his friends. Meanwhile, Peggy is in New Orleans at Mardi Gras looking for her missing father. Note: Katey Sagal makes a short appearance due to her pregnancy.
228	19	"Spring Break: Part 2"	Gerry Cohen	Calvin Brown, Jr.	February 25, 1996	1018	13.4
Conclusion. When Al discovers that the bikini competition Jefferson is judging has a $100,000 prize, he has Kelly enter, and Griff and he become judges to pick Kelly. Marcy, along with Bud and his friends, after many hiccups, finally arrives at Fort Lauderdale and plots to stop the others. Note: Katey Sagal does not appear in this episode due to her pregnancy.
229	20	"Turning Japanese"	Sam W. Orender	Fran E. Kaufer	March 17, 1996	1020	12.2
Marcy gets a chance to get promoted, but she has to impress her Japanese boss (Pat Morita). He sets his eyes on Al's Dodge. Marcy tries to convince Al to sell his Dodge by offering a lot of money and taking him to the Nudie Bar, where she meets her boss, too. Note: Katey Sagal does not appear in this episode due to her pregnancy/childbirth.
230	21	"Al Goes to the Dogs"	Sam W. Orender	Garry Bowren & Laurie Lee-Goss	March 24, 1996	1022	12.3
After taking Lucky out daily at 3:00 am, Al decides to build a dog house. Marcy calls a building inspector to trouble him. Kelly tries to woo Carlos by changing her looks. Finally, with Carlos's money and help, Al gets the dog house up with all permissions intact. Note: Katey Sagal does not appear in this episode due to her pregnancy/childbirth.
231	22	"Enemies"	Gerry Cohen	Richard Gurman & Stacie Lipp & Russell Marcus	April 14, 1996	1024	10.8
In this spinoff episode structured as an off-shoot version of the series Friends (which features Kelly in a major role and the rest of the Bundy family, Al and Bud, in supporting roles), Kelly begins dating a UPS deliveryman, named Tom, who is only using her to get back at his ex-girlfriend, Shanon for cheating on him. The bulk of this episode mainly focuses on the conflict between Tom and Shanon, who live together in a large apartment in downtown Chicago with Tom's half-sister Maria and her unemployed sexy boyfriend Jackson. When Tom takes Kelly out to their local Grease Spoon diner for dinner, Sharon brings along a wealthy businessman to make Tom jealous. Note: Katey Sagal does not appear in this episode due to childbirth. Guest stars: Nicole Eggert as Shannon, Matt Borlenghi as Tom, Terri Ivens as Maria, Melissa Chan as Keiko, Phill Lewis as George, Chris Young as Jackson, Alan Thicke as Henry, Jean Speegle Howard as Claire and Rance Howard as Edwin.
232	23	"Bud Hits the Books"	Sam W. Orender	Stacie Lipp	April 28, 1996	1021	9.7
Sex gets in the way of Bud studying for his finals, and he risks being expelled when he is caught masturbating in the school library. Marcy comes to his rescue by defending him while Al and his NO MA'AM buddies, who were initially disgusted over what Bud did, protest over the school's anti-masturbation rule. Note: Katey Sagal does not appear in this episode due to childbirth.
233	24	"Kiss of the Coffee Woman"	Sam W. Orender	Story by : Todd Newman; Teleplay by : Dvora Inwood	May 5, 1996	1023	11.9
Kelly gets a commercial where the male lead is fired. Jefferson pitches in and they get very popular. For a follow-up commercial, they have to kiss. Al and Marcy get very angry and go to the set, where they discover that the scene has been changed to postcoital. Jefferson leaves due to some creative differences, and Al and Marcy replace them. Note: Katey Sagal does not appear in this episode due to childbirth.
234	25	"Torch Song Duet"	Gerry Cohen	Donelle Q. Buck	May 19, 1996	1025	13.7
Al helps Griff win a trip to Atlanta for the Olympic Games by helping him answer questions on a radio sports quiz, from where he is banned. As a thanks, Griff agrees to allow Al to hold the Olympic Torch, until a girl comes by. With fame and photo and in Big 'Uns, Al gets very jealous and throws the torch into the mall fountain. Note: Katey Sagal does not appear in this episode due to childbirth.
235	26	"The Joke's on Al"	Amanda Bearse	Calvin Brown, Jr.	May 19, 1996	1026	13.4
Members of NO MA'AM start playing practical jokes on each other. Griff lands in prison, gets tried, and is sentenced to death for being a cannibal. Jefferson and Al take turns and fool each other. When an old "friend" of Peggy's comes to seduce Al to avenge Peggy, he thinks it is all an elaborate practical joke done by Jefferson and plays along. Finally, it goes on till the wedding, but Peggy finally arrives home on time to stop it after finally finding her missing father who finally agrees to take back Peggy's mother to Wanker County. Peggy sees it as an opportunity to renew her wedding vows, but Al continuously keeps saying "I don't". Meanwhile, Kelly keeps erasing all the messages on the phone. Note: Amanda Bearse does not appear in this episode. Guest stars: Tim Conway as Ephraim Wanker, Gary Coleman as Reverend
