= Naughty or Nice =

Naughty or Nice may refer to:

- Naughty or Nice (album), a 2002 album by 3LW
- Naughty or Nice (film), a 2004 American television film
- A Loud House Christmas Movie: Naughty or Nice, a 2025 animated film.
