= Married... with Children season 6 =

1991–92 season of American TV series

Married... with Children
- Season 6
- DVD cover
- Showrunners: Ron Leavitt; Michael G. Moye
- Starring: Ed O'Neill; Katey Sagal; Amanda Bearse; Christina Applegate; David Faustino; Ted McGinley
- No. of episodes: 26

Release
- Original network: Fox
- Original release: September 8, 1991 – May 17, 1992

Season chronology
- ← Previous; Season 5 Next → Season 7

This is a list of episodes for the sixth season (1991–92) of the television series Married... with Children. The season aired on Fox from September 8, 1991, to May 17, 1992.

Following his marriage to Marcy after a drunken encounter, Jefferson D'Arcy (Ted McGinley) is promoted to series regular. Throughout the season, both Peg and Marcy were pregnant, as Katey Sagal was pregnant in real life. Sagal's child was stillborn six weeks before term, causing her to miss four episodes of this season. At the end of the season's 11th episode, "Al Bundy, Shoe Dick", the women's pregnancies were revealed to be merely part of one of Al's nightmares. This season also had Steve Rhoades return for one episode, Kelly become the "Verminator", and the Bundys travel to England. Additionally, this season introduced Bud's hip-hop-inspired alter ego "Grandmaster B", concocted to help him with women, which continued after the dream revelation by having Al ask Bud about the nickname and Bud deciding that he likes it enough to use it.

Amanda Bearse and Ted McGinley both were absent for two episodes.

This was the final season for Ron Leavitt and Michael G. Moye as joint showrunners; Leavitt served as sole showrunner for the following season before leaving the show altogether thereafter.

== Episodes ==
No. overall	No. in season	Title	Directed by	Written by	Original release date	Prod. code	U.S. viewers (millions)
106	1	"She's Having My Baby: Part 1"	Gerry Cohen	Ron Leavitt & Michael G. Moye	September 8, 1991	6.01	29.2
Part one of two: Marcy and Peg announce that they are pregnant. Jefferson is happy and is willing to run chores for Marcy. Meanwhile, Al is devastated and so are Bud and Kelly. Note: This was the highest-ranking episode at the time of broadcast, ranking at number two for the week with almost 30 million viewers.
107	2	"She's Having My Baby: Part 2"	Gerry Cohen	Kevin Curran	September 15, 1991	6.02	23.7
Conclusion: Al and Jefferson try to run away from their wives when they cannot take the pregnancies anymore.
108	3	"If Al Had a Hammer"	Gerry Cohen	Kevin Curran	September 22, 1991	6.03	26.1
Al builds himself a private room in the garage, using the Bundy hammer. After he loses it to a bunch of pregnant women, however, he tears it down out of anger. Meanwhile, Bud develops a hip-hop inspired alter-ego named "Grandmaster B" when he enrolls in junior college. Note: Ed O'Neill's wife (Catherine Rusoff) appears as one of the pregnant women.
109	4	"Cheese, Cues and Blood"	Gerry Cohen	Story by : Allan Davis; Teleplay by : Brian Scully	September 29, 1991	6.04	22.6
Al begins to suspect that Kelly is selling her body for sex (with Jefferson as her pimp) when she begins earning a lot of money in a short amount of time. But when Al discovers that Kelly and Jefferson are betting on games for cash at a local pool hall, Al sells his blood to get in on it.
110	5	"Looking for a Desk in All the Wrong Places"	Gerry Cohen	Stacie Lipp	October 6, 1991	6.05	21.6
An insane Marcy drags Peg along to find her childhood toys — including a pink desk — that were auctioned off because Jefferson did not pay for their storage unit. Meanwhile, Al, Kelly and Bud hold a "we hate the baby" meeting without Peg's knowledge.
111	6	"Buck Has a Bellyache"	Gerry Cohen	Ellen L. Fogle	October 13, 1991	6.06	19.7
Peg moves back in with her family after Al, Kelly and Bud ignore her because they are looking after Buck, who has lost his appetite. Meanwhile, Jefferson shows sympathy for Marcy's pregnancy, which she enjoys greatly.
112	7	"If I Could See Me Now"	Amanda Bearse	Gabrielle Topping	October 27, 1991	6.07	18.0
After causing one too many car crashes, Al gives in and buys glasses — but his newfound vision makes him see just how pathetic his life truly is. Note: Katey Sagal and Amanda Bearse do not appear in this episode. This episode also marks Bearse's directorial debut; she directed at least four episodes each season for the remainder of the show's run.
113	8	"God's Shoes"	Gerry Cohen	Ellen L. Fogle	November 3, 1991	6.08	18.5
Al falls out of his bedroom window after seeing a $2,500 painting of Peg. When he regains consciousness, Al tells his kids that he saw God's shoes and with Jefferson's help (and Marcy's money), he decides to sell said shoes to the masses. Note: Katey Sagal does not appear in this episode.
114	9	"Kelly Does Hollywood: Part 1"	Gerry Cohen	Larry Jacobson	November 10, 1991	6.09	19.7
Part one of two: Al finally gets cable TV at home and watches Marcy on the public-access television cable TV channel. Kelly then starts her own talk show on the public-access channel, that gets picked up by a major Hollywood network. Note: Katey Sagal does not appear in this episode.
115	10	"Kelly Does Hollywood: Part 2"	Gerry Cohen	Larry Jacobson	November 17, 1991	6.10	15.0
Conclusion: Al, Kelly, and Bud travel to Hollywood, where Kelly meets an executive producer (played by former Saturday Night Live cast member Jon Lovitz), who is interested in her show. However, the network's executives end up changing Kelly's show drastically and it subsequently gets cancelled. Note: Katey Sagal and Ted McGinley do not appear in this episode.
116	11	"Al Bundy, Shoe Dick"	Gerry Cohen	Larry Jacobson	November 24, 1991	6.11	22.4
In this fantasy episode, Al leads a double life as a detective who is being framed for the murder of a rich woman's grandfather. By solving the case, he wins $50,000. Al then wakes up and realizes that it was a dream. He also realizes that his wife and Marcy's pregnancies were also just dreams. (Guest star Traci Lords) Note: Ted McGinley does not appear in this episode.
117	12	"So This Is How Sinatra Felt"	Gerry Cohen	Stacie Lipp	December 1, 1991	6.12	21.7
Peg is worried that a "shoe groupie" (guest star Jessica Hahn) may be seducing Al, so she sends Kelly and Bud to spy on him. Al is then made to choose between Peg and the groupie.
118	13	"I Who Have Nothing"	Gerry Cohen	Katherine Green	December 22, 1991	6.13	19.0
Al discovers that he truly has no possessions of his own, and decides to get back one of the things that truly meant a lot to him — his championship game ball that he gave to a once in-shape cheerleader who wants Al for sex.
119	14	"The Mystery of Skull Island"	Gerry Cohen	Kevin Curran	January 5, 1992	6.14	23.1
Bud dates a hot girl who is only interested in daredevils. Meanwhile, Al, Marcy, and Jefferson play a relationship board game.
120	15	"Just Shoe It"	Gerry Cohen	Lisa Chernin	January 19, 1992	6.15	20.8
Al wins the chance to appear in a sneaker commercial featuring famous sports stars, such as baseball player Steve Carlton, football player Ed "Too Tall" Jones, and boxer Sugar Ray Leonard.
121	16	"Rites of Passage"	Gerry Cohen	Ilunga Adell	February 9, 1992	6.16	18.8
While Peggy, Marcy and Jefferson plan a child's birthday party for Bud's 18th birthday, Al decides to take his son to his favorite strip club: The Nudie Bar.
122	17	"The Egg and I"	Gerry Cohen	Ellen L. Fogle	February 16, 1992	6.17	23.1
Steve Rhoades returns to reclaim his wife, but is shocked to find that Marcy has remarried. The Bundys then argue whether friendship is more important than money when they find out that Steve is currently on the run from the police for stealing a rare hawk egg from a national park.
123	18	"My Dinner With Anthrax"	Gerry Cohen	Larry Jacobson	February 23, 1992	6.19	22.4
Bud and Kelly trick Al and Peg into going on vacation in Florida for their 20th anniversary when Bud and Kelly win the chance to have thrash metal band Anthrax over at their house. The vacation turns out to be a timeshare scam with Edd Byrnes as one of the tenants (who lives there only because it was offered to him for free). Things soon get interesting back home when the band members scrounge in the refrigerator and sample Peg's "mystery package" (that no one ever wants to try) and begin to hallucinate.
124	19	"Psychic Avengers"	Amanda Bearse	Calvin Brown, Jr.	March 1, 1992	6.18	18.3
The Bundys and Jefferson get involved in a psychic hotline scam. Note: Amanda Bearse does not appear in this episode.
125	20	"Hi I.Q."	Gerry Cohen	Steve Crider	March 22, 1992	6.20	22.7
Kelly gets invited to a party for intellectuals, which turns out to be a party where intellectuals bring along idiots as ridiculed dates in order to win a contest. Meanwhile, Al and Jefferson attempt to build a tool bench — with disastrous results.
126	21	"Teacher Pets"	Gerry Cohen	Katherine Green	April 5, 1992	6.21	23.5
Bud tries to prove to others that his substitute teacher has a crush on him. Meanwhile, Peg is sick with the flu and Al crashes children's parties at Chuck E. Cheese's in order to get free food.
127	22	"The Goodbye Girl"	Gerry Cohen	Stacie Lipp	April 19, 1992	6.22	19.8
While Al is on an imaginary trip around the world, Kelly gets a job at a TV history museum — and becomes a bug-killing TV personality known as "The Verminator". Meanwhile, Jefferson is harassed by kids who think they recognize him from Happy Days and The Love Boat. Note: In real life, Ted McGinley was on both shows.
128	23	"The Gas Station Show"	Gerry Cohen	Michael G. Moye & Ron Leavitt	April 26, 1992	6.23	20.6
While out on a drive on "Bundy Sunday Funday", Al ends up working at a gas station in order to pay for the snacks Peg and the kids bought.
129	24	"England Show: Part 1"	Gerry Cohen	Ellen L. Fogle	May 3, 1992	6.24	19.0
Part one of three: In the 17th century, a witch (Helena Carroll) curses a British town called Lower Uncton to be forever shrouded in darkness after a Bundy ancestor insults her, and the only way for the curse to be broken is to kill all living male Bundy descendants by luring them to Lower Uncton. In the present day, the Bundys win a free trip to the United Kingdom. Marcy and Jefferson learn about this and decide to tag along, but they lose their luggage at London Heathrow Airport. The Bundys were invited to Britain by Winston (Bill Oddie) and Igor (Steven Hartley), two Lower Uncton residents, to lure them to their village so they can kill both Al and Bud to lift the 339-year-old curse, but the residents of the neighboring town of Upper Uncton, under the command of the mayor Trevor (Alun Armstrong), plot to kill Al and Bud in London to ensure that the purgatory curse over Lower Uncton never gets broken, which would ruin Upper Uncton's tourist town reputation.
130	25	"England Show: Part 2" "Wastin' the Company's Money"	Gerry Cohen	Stacie Lipp	May 10, 1992	6.25	18.6
Part two of three: While the Bundys continue to enjoy their vacation in the United Kingdom, (and take advantage of their tour guide, Winston's, money), the people of Lower and Upper Uncton (the latter of whom use Lower Uncton as a tourist attraction and want to make the curse permanent) plot to murder Al and Bud. Meanwhile, broke and lost Marcy and Jefferson end up in a London S&M club, which they mistake for a theater. Eventually, Kelly gets lost in London and is coerced by Upper Uncton mayor Trevor to lure the Bundys away from Lower Uncton and she sets off to find her family.
131	26	"England Show: Part 3" "We're Spending as Fast as We Can"	Gerry Cohen	Kevin Curran	May 17, 1992	6.26	17.1
Conclusion: Kelly arrives in Lower Uncton to rescue the Bundys, but in attempting to escape, they find themselves caught between the two feuding mobs of Lower and Upper Uncton residents. Al challenges Igor, the jousting head of Upper Uncton, to a jousting match to spare the lives of the Bundy men. When Al wins, the curse is lifted and the Bundys return to the United States (except for Al, who gets imprisoned for stealing hotel towels.)
