= Married... with Children season 11 =

1996–97 season of American TV series

Married... with Children
- Season 11
- DVD cover
- Showrunner: Pamela Eells
- Starring: Ed O'Neill; Katey Sagal; Amanda Bearse; Christina Applegate; David Faustino; Ted McGinley
- No. of episodes: 24

Release
- Original network: Fox
- Original release: September 28, 1996 – June 9, 1997

Season chronology
- ← Previous; Season 10

This is a list of episodes for the eleventh and final season (1996–97) of the television series Married... with Children. The season aired on Fox from September 28, 1996, to June 9, 1997.

Fox moved the show's time slot several times throughout the course of the season, which cost the show ratings. Rising production costs and decreasing viewer shares led to the show's cancellation on April 17, 1997, after the final taping for Season 11. This was the only season to feature teaser scenes before the opening credits and a few episodes during this season also featured tag scenes just before the closing credits. For this season, the still of Al and Peggy sitting on the couch was dropped from the closing credits, which for this season are shown against a black background and in a separate card format, instead of scrolling. The opening theme was also greatly shortened, dropping the highway scenes taken from National Lampoon's Vacation, as well as the scene of Al on the couch giving money to Bud, Kelly, Peg, and their dog.

Amanda Bearse missed five episodes this season. Ted McGinley also missed one episode.

This is the only season for Pamela Eells as showrunner.

In May 2022, it was announced an animated revival of the series with the original cast was in the works. In July 2025, it was confirmed that the animated revival was no longer in development.

== Episodes ==
No. overall	No. in season	Title	Directed by	Written by	Original release date	Prod. code	U.S. viewers (millions)
236	1	"Twisted"	Gerry Cohen	Richard Gurman	September 28, 1996	11.03	8.3
To scare a woman into having sex with him, Bud simulates a tornado – which turns all too real when an actual tornado is headed for Chicago. Marcy takes up as their leader and the Bundys and D'Arcys move into the Bundy house basement. Kelly goes out to look for Lucky. It is revealed in this episode that the Bundy basement has a "secret escape route" (behind the large picture of the busty blonde in a bikini on the far wall) that leads to the underlying part of the stage in the Jiggly Room.
237	2	"Children of the Corns"	Amanda Bearse	Matthew Berry & Eric Abrams	October 5, 1996	11.02	7.4
Al and Griff blackmail Gary because of a bad promotion contest, when they find the shoes from the shoe store are made by children in sweatshops. They rope in Jefferson and Bud's help. Meanwhile, Peggy wins a microwave and recruits Kelly to help her hide it from Al.
238	3	"Kelly's Gotta Habit"	Amanda Bearse	Laurie Lee-Goss & Garry Bowren	October 12, 1996	11.06	6.7
Kelly must abstain from sex to get a part as a nun in a commercial for "extra extra virgin olive oil", while Al poses as a police officer and appears with Officer Dan on the TV show COPS. Guest star: Tina Yothers as herself
239	4	"Requiem for a Chevyweight: Part 1"	Gerry Cohen	Steve Faber & Bob Fisher	November 10, 1996	11.07	13.3
Part one of two. Al's Dodge starts sputtering so he sends the rest of the family to find a fuel pump for it. The episode also includes flashbacks of how the Dodge has always been with Al, from his days as a high school athlete to his descent into becoming a reluctant husband to Peg and father to Kelly (who became stupid when Al hit the brakes on his car and she hit her head while reading) and Bud (who became a pervert when Peg gave Bud one of Kelly's rubber dolls to play with). Note: Amanda Bearse does not appear in this episode.
240	5	"Requiem for a Chevyweight: Part 2"	Amanda Bearse	Russell Marcus	November 17, 1996	11.09	9.1
Part two of two. Al buries the Dodge in the backyard and has a funeral for it (complete with his buddy Ike playing the bagpipes), and leases a new sports car, the Testica 2000, which turns out to be a lemon. Meanwhile, Peg, Kelly and Bud dig up the Dodge so they can sell the engine to a collector for $10,000, but ex-CIA operative Jefferson makes a quick trip to Cuba to ask a favor of his old nemesis, Fidel Castro: since there are so many old cars there due to the trade embargo, maybe one of them has a fuel pump that might fit in the Dodge.
241	6	"A Bundy Thanksgiving"	Amanda Bearse	Vince Cheung & Ben Montanio	November 24, 1996	11.11	10.1
When Jefferson cannot find a turkey for Marcy to cook, Bud, Jefferson, and Peg go after Kelly's pet turkey so they can kill it and cook it for Thanksgiving. Kelly tries to save Hank the turkey, by throwing it out of the window so that it flies away, but it instead dies and becomes their dinner. Meanwhile, Al and Griff go to a black neighborhood to find Al's favorite pie maker and end up in her funeral. He steals the pie from the funeral. NFL on Fox personalities James Brown, Terry Bradshaw, Ronnie Lott, and Howie Long guest star.
242	7	"The Juggs Have Left the Building"	Gerry Cohen	Vince Cheung & Ben Montanio	December 1, 1996	11.08	8.5
Peg wants to go to Branson, Missouri, and the Bundys end up there with no money by chaining their car to a bus. The prize for the local talent contest is $500, so Peg and Kelly enter as a singing duo called "The Juggs", and turn out to be talented enough to win not only the money, but a gig touring with Tammy Wynette for a year – until they all manage to screw it up and she fires them. Meanwhile, Jefferson and Marcy agree to feed Lucky while the Bundys are gone and start feeling a little amorous, but they can't decide on what bedroom game to play. They try a new one: they dress up as Al and Peg and do a little role-playing, which leads to a hot time in Al's and Peg's bedroom. Guest star: Tammy Wynette as herself
243	8	"God Help Ye Merry Bundymen"	Amanda Bearse	Steve Faber & Bob Fisher	December 22, 1996	11.13	8.9
Gary hires two young men to help out Al and Griff for the Christmas sale. They take advantage of them and make them do all the work. When the boys are trained, Gary fires Al and Griff and they end up taking menial jobs at the mall. When the new boys quit, Al and Griff get their jobs back. To win the neighborhood decoration competition, Marcy gets life-sized Virgin Mary and Joseph statues, which get kidnapped by Kelly and Bud. When they try to get a ransom from the D’Arcys, it goes horribly wrong. Peg gets into making gingerbread houses and bakes a replica of the entire neighborhood, which gets her the first prize in the decorating contest.
244	9	"Crimes Against Obesity"	Amanda Bearse	Russell Marcus	December 29, 1996	11.05	12.4
On his birthday, when Al insults fat women on the way to the Jiggly Room, he is put on trial in the shoe store by a group of fat women who accuse him of being prejudiced against the obese. Meanwhile, Bud and Kelly attempt to tint the Dodge's windows as a birthday present to Al. Peg bakes him a cake and eats it. She later comes to the shoe store to watch Al getting tried and tortured by the fat women by having them rip up the free coupons that he accumulated over the years in each insult he makes about them. Despite being sympathetic to the women's plight since her mother was obese, Peg openly insults them for ruining the free coupons. Note: Amanda Bearse does not appear in this episode.
245	10	"The Stepford Peg"	Amanda Bearse	Valerie Ahern & Christian McLaughlin	January 6, 1997	11.01	7.78
Peggy slips on a candy bar wrapper and hits her head on the table, giving her amnesia. With no memory of how she used to be, Al brainwashes Peg into acting like the perfect housewife. Even when Marcy tries to tell her the truth, Peg doesn't believe her. When she and Al are trying to have sex, her memory comes back and she makes him have sex again as a punishment.
246	11	"Bud on the Side"	Sam W. Orender	Valerie Ahern & Christian McLaughlin	January 13, 1997	11.10	8.17
Al tells Bud to lower his standards in finding women when he can't get a date. Al and Griff take off to avoid explaining to Gary why the sales have dropped 500% and still they are asking for a break room. Bud stops by and Gary finds him attractive. Al, Peg and Kelly later catch Gary trying to sneak out of Bud's room, much to Al's horror. But all is okay when she decides to build them a break room at the shoe store and install a big-screen TV and a refrigerator stocked with beer. After a while, Bud doesn't like being treated as a piece of meat that exists only to satisfy Gary's carnal desires. Note: Amanda Bearse does not appear in this episode.
247	12	"Grime and Punishment"	Sam W. Orender	Steve Faber & Bob Fisher	January 20, 1997	11.04	6.87
Kelly takes an improv class and Al takes advantage of her by asking her to act (work) like him. Bud asks Al to repair the basement after Al starts charging him rent. When Al refuses, Bud calls a health inspector (Marianne Muellerleile) who makes Al live in the basement after it is deemed uninhabitable. Bud then gets Marcy, Kelly and Peg to torture him so that he repairs the basement.
248	13	"T*R*A*S*H"	Amanda Bearse	Story by : Todd Newman & David Faustino; Teleplay by : Terry Maloney & Mindy Morgenstern	January 27, 1997	11.14	7.12
Seeking regular meals, Al and Griff join the Army with Jefferson's help. Marcy makes Kelly and Bud pick up all the garbage they threw into her yard. After training, Al and Griff end up cleaning up due to a garbage strike with Jefferson as their leader.
249	14	"Breaking Up Is Easy to Do: Part 1"	Mark K. Samuels	Eric Abrams & Matthew Berry	February 24, 1997	11.16	11.85
Part one of three. Bud gets Kelly a new acting gig, where she has to compete with Heather, her nemesis. They end up challenging each other to a boxing match. After a lot of training, Kelly beats Heather. When Al and Peggy lose badly in a "Know Your Spouse Board Game" against Marcy and Jefferson and Griff and his girlfriend, they decide to see a marriage counselor on Marcy's and Jefferson's suggestion. They fight and break up.
250	15	"Breaking Up Is Easy to Do: Part 2"	Gerry Cohen	Russell Marcus	February 24, 1997	11.17	11.85
Part two of three. Al moves out of the house and into an apartment near an airport. He invites Griff and Jefferson over to celebrate. Peg is heartbroken and the kids try to cheer her up. Marcy and the rest of the neighborhood celebrate with fireworks and parades. The girls and the guys go to the same bar to pick up a new mate for Peg and Al. Peg ends up finding herself a man, whom the kids love.
251	16	"Breaking Up Is Easy to Do: Part 3"	Gerry Cohen	Russell Marcus	March 3, 1997	11.18	10.11
Part three of three. Al keeps striking out with women. Bud and Kelly break up Peg and her new boyfriend after discovering that he'll put the entire family to work. Peg admits that she misses Al and goes to meet him. They go out together and make up.
252	17	"Live Nude Peg"	Amanda Bearse	Matthew Berry & Eric Abrams	March 10, 1997	11.12	9.71
Peggy poses as a stripper in the Jiggly Room's talent search to trick Al and wins. She has to keep her identity a secret because Al loves Peggy's stripper persona more than herself. Bud forces Kelly to gain weight for a weight-loss commercial, which all goes to her butt.
253	18	"A Babe in Toyland"	Gerry Cohen	Valerie Ahern & Christian McLaughlin	March 17, 1997	11.15	7.77
Kelly takes over for a surly kids' show host after he goes insane on the set. She entertains the kids with a puppet that looks like Bud. She belittles all the other characters in the show and fires Bud. Finally Bud gets her fired by getting the old host back. Meanwhile, Al and Peg experiment with sleeping in separate beds; first twin beds and then bunk beds. Note: Amanda Bearse and Ted McGinley do not appear in this episode.
254	19	"Birthday Boy Toy"	Gerry Cohen	Terry Maloney & Mindy Morgenstern	March 31, 1997	11.19	9.12
Al cuts off Peggy from shopping. Jefferson is very insecure about his looks and turns to Peggy for help. Peggy gets him hooked on shopping. When Marcy objects, he gets a job as an exercise coach, where all the girls ogle him. Marcy forces him to resign. Bud directs a commercial for Gary Shoes with Kelly and Al. After a bad performance, Griff replaces Al and Al tries to sabotage the shoot.
255	20	"Damn Bundys"	Richard Correll	Ben Montanio & Vince Cheung	April 28, 1997	11.20	9.73
Al makes a pact with The Devil (Robert Englund) to play with the Chicago Bears and take them to the Super Bowl in exchange for his soul. When Al insists on not quitting after his aim is achieved, The Devil sends him to Hell, where he meets his entire family, as well as the D'Arcys, who are now dead. As his life is exactly as it is on Earth, he challenges The Devil to a football match for returning to Earth.
256	21	"Lez Be Friends"	Gerry Cohen	Pamela Eells	April 28, 1997	11.22	10.17
Marcy's cousin, Mandy (Amanda Bearse in a dual role) comes to town and befriends Al. Marcy, being very jealous of her cousin, asks Al to keep her away from Jefferson. Later Mandy reveals that she is a lesbian (in real life, Bearse is a lesbian) to Al and then to Marcy, which makes her very angry, considering that Mandy stole many of Marcy's boyfriends. Al manages to console Marcy into accepting Mandy.
257	22	"The Desperate Half-Hour"	Gerry Cohen	Valerie Ahern & Christian McLaughlin	May 5, 1997	11.23	15.20
Bud's pen-pal from prison (Tricia Cast) and her boyfriend (Charles Esten) pay a visit to the Bundy household and take the family hostage. Marcy and Jefferson dress up for a cruise and visit the Bundys to rub it in. Kelly ends up falling in love with the prisoner's boyfriend, Lonnie. Meanwhile, Al and Griff plan to watch a pay-per-view 3D movie at home but end up as hostages too.
258	23	"How to Marry a Moron"	Gerry Cohen	Story by : Vince Cheung & Ben Montanio; Teleplay by : Russell Marcus & Pamela Eells	May 5, 1997	11.24	15.20
After Lonnie is released from jail, he proposes to Kelly. When Al realizes that Lonnie is the son of the Weenie Tots owner, he agrees. With hours before Kelly's wedding, Al learns that Kelly's new beau is lusting for other women. He is in a dilemma, but finally ends up breaking the wedding. Note: Fox cited this episode alongside "The Desperate Half-Hour" as the very last episode and series finale.
259	24	"Chicago Shoe Exchange"	Mark K. Samuels	Matthew Berry & Eric Abrams	June 9, 1997	11.21	6.26
Al and Griff turn the shoe store into a barter shop after Gary leaves, so they can get massage chairs. Finally they are forced to reverse their work when Gary returns. Meanwhile, Kelly takes massage lessons and tests them out on Bud, which goes horribly wrong. Note: Amanda Bearse does not appear in this episode.
