= Married... with Children season 8 =

1993–94 season of American TV series

Married... with Children
- Season 8
- DVD cover
- Showrunner: Michael G. Moye
- Starring: Ed O'Neill; Katey Sagal; Amanda Bearse; Christina Applegate; David Faustino; Ted McGinley
- No. of episodes: 26

Release
- Original network: Fox
- Original release: September 5, 1993 – May 22, 1994

Season chronology
- ← Previous; Season 7 Next → Season 9

This is a list of episodes for the eighth season (1993–94) of the television series Married... with Children. The season aired on Fox from September 5, 1993, to May 22, 1994.

This season introduces many of Al's friends, including Aaron, Bob Rooney and Officer Dan (though Officer Dan was not a character in the earlier seasons, the actor who played him also appeared in "Rock 'n Roll Girl" as the sheriff who issued Al a ticket for an insulting bumper sticker, "Weenie Tot Lovers and Other Strangers" as the police officer who arrested Al, and "The Egg and I" as the FBI agent searching for Steve). Al, Jefferson, Bob Rooney, and Officer Dan (along with Griff and Ike, who are introduced in season 9) all become members of NO MA'AM in the episode where the men fight back against a talk show host (played by Jerry Springer) known as "The Masculine Feminist". This is also the season where Bud joins a fraternity. The closest explanation for Seven's mysterious disappearance 14 months before is in the episode "Ride Scare", where a closeup on a carton of milk reveals a picture of Seven with the word "Missing". Al's plus-sized model friends simply look at it without comment before helping themselves.

Amanda Bearse missed three episodes this season.

== Episodes ==
No. overall	No. in season	Title	Directed by	Written by	Original release date	Prod. code	U.S. viewers (millions)
158	1	"A Tisket, a Tasket, Can Peg Make a Basket?"	Tony Singletary	Kim Weiskopf	September 5, 1993	801	14.5
Al reluctantly takes Peg along to a charity basketball game, where his obnoxious behavior leads to several altercations with all-star Xavier McDaniel. Meanwhile, Peg is chosen to take part in a $10,000 free throw contest, while Kelly tries to get up and close with the players. Guest stars: NBA players Xavier McDaniel, Vlade Divac, Clyde Drexler and sportscaster Ray Clay.
159	2	"Hood 'n the Boyz"	Tony Singletary	Michael G. Moye	September 12, 1993	802	15.2
Al and Peg go to the big city for their second honeymoon where Al is called to help his childhood girlfriend deal with a young tough guy and his gang.
160	3	"Proud to Be Your Bud?"	Tony Singletary	Stacie Lipp	September 19, 1993	803	15.0
Bud builds a portal in the basement that summons his true self, who tells him how much of a loser he is. Meanwhile, the rest of the Bundy family worry that Bud may be going insane, except for Al, who's fighting with a voice mail system to get parts for his Dodge.
161	4	"Luck of the Bundys"	Tony Singletary	Richard Gurman	September 26, 1993	804	17.0
Al is worried that his and his family's sudden string of good luck may be reversed because nothing good can ever come from being a Bundy. Finally everything goes wrong and Al is happy. Guest star: Lee Arenberg
162	5	"Banking on Marcy"	Tony Singletary	Stacie Lipp	October 3, 1993	805	16.6
Marcy works through her fear of public speaking by imagining herself having sex. Meanwhile, Al gets interested in rap videos. Note: This is the only episode to be rated TV-14 in reruns due to strong sexual content (S) and crude sexual dialogue (D)
163	6	"No Chicken, No Check"	Tony Singletary	Ralph R. Farquhar	October 10, 1993	806	16.5
Kelly and Bud buy a new car, but end up having to share it when Bud dates a foreign exchange student while Kelly dates a commercial actor. Meanwhile, Al insures the car as a farm vehicle, and in order to collect in case of an accident, there must be a chicken in the car, hence the episode title.
164	7	"Take My Wife, Please"	Tony Singletary	Story by : Brad Yuen; Teleplay by : Peter Gaulke & Eddie Feldmann	October 24, 1993	807	21.0
In this Halloween episode, Al wishes he was dead, and is visited by the Grim Reaper with a very familiar face. He can escape death only if a family member wished he was around before mid-night. Meanwhile, Peg, Bud, Kelly, and Jefferson impersonate The Village People at a party for menopausal women. They perform the same song over and over again. Guest star: Mindy Seeger as Jeannie and Patrika Darbo as Ethel.
165	8	"Scared Single"	Sam W. Orender	Katherine Green	November 7, 1993	808	15.6
Al hires a young high school football player, named Aaron, to work in his shoe store for the summer, and then tries to keep from getting married — until he meets his girlfriend, who isn't anything like Peg. Meanwhile, Kelly gets stung by beetles in a Verminator commercial and goes insane.
166	9	"NO MA'AM"	Tony Singletary	Larry Jacobson	November 14, 1993	809	12.6
After women are given their own bowling night and the Nudie Bar is turned into a women's coffeehouse, Al organizes a men's anti-feminist group called NO MA'AM (National Organization of Men Against Amazonian Masterhood) and face off against a talk show host (played by real-life talk show host Jerry Springer) known as "The Masculine Feminist".
167	10	"Dances with Weezie"	Tony Singletary	Richard Gurman	November 21, 1993	810	19.4
Al and Jefferson bribe Bud and Kelly to impersonate them for their wives while they sneak out of a Jeffersons reunion performance on stage in a Chicago theater to go to the opening of a new sports bar, where they end up in a bar fight. Features guest appearances by Joe Namath, Johnny Bench, and Ernie Banks.
168	11	"Change for a Buck"	Amanda Bearse	Kim Weiskopf	November 28, 1993	811	12.9
Buck (voiced by guest star Cheech Marin) runs away from home and ends up at a dog pound, where he'll face getting gassed if the Bundys don't retrieve him. The family doesn't notice him to be gone till the last minute. Note: Amanda Bearse does not appear in this episode.
169	12	"A Little Off the Top"	Sam W. Orender	Michael G. Moye	December 12, 1993	812	12.1
Al suffers a back injury while playing football with Aaron and some neighborhood teens and is taken to the hospital where, instead of a circular incision for his back, he gets a circumcision. Confined at home on short-term disability for one month, the family tries their best to keep him away from getting aroused. Meanwhile, Marcy naturally has a great time making fun of Al from this latest bad luck turn of events.
170	13	"The Worst Noel"	Amanda Bearse	Larry Jacobson	December 19, 1993	813	16.4
On Christmas Eve, Kelly and Bud struggle to get a jukebox into the house without Al and Peg (who spend the entire episode arguing over what to watch on TV) seeing them.
171	14	"Sofa So Good"	Amanda Bearse	Doug McIntyre	January 16, 1994	815	21.5
While Al and Peg are away at a family reunion in Wanker County, Kelly's boyfriend ruins Peggy's couch, prompting the two to find a new, identical-looking couch before Al and Peg come home. Kelly must make a difficult deal with the couch-maker to replace it. Note: Amanda Bearse does not appear in this episode.
172	15	"Honey, I Blew Up Myself"	Sam W. Orender	Wayne Kline	January 23, 1994	814	21.5
Peg gets a boudoir photo of herself taken as a birthday present to Al, which gets blown up to billboard size and posted next to the shoe store, where Al becomes jealous of all the men who find Peg attractive. He finally turns to Marcy's women's group FANG (Feminists Against Neanderthal Guys) for help. Meanwhile, Bud and Kelly try to find a perfect birthday gift for Al and end up buying stuff he already has and hates.
173	16	"How Green Was My Apple"	Gerry Cohen	Katherine Green	February 6, 1994	816	18.7
The Bundys and the D'Arcys fight over possession of an apple tree, and then everything around their house. Gary Coleman, Danny Bonaduce, and Dave Madden guest star.
174	17	"Valentine's Day Massacre"	Gerry Cohen	Cindy Begel	February 13, 1994	818	18.1
Bud learns about an old Valentine, Crystal Brooks, whom Kelly forgot to tell him about...and who is now a big-league pop-singer. While Bud negotiates Crystal's security-team in order to reunite with her, Al shops for Peg's Valentine's Day gift.
175	18	"Get Outta Dodge"	Sam W. Orender	Mark Driscoll	February 20, 1994	817	16.1
Peg forces Al to sell the Dodge and he places an ad. The Dodge Company offers a new Dodge Viper for his Dodge if he lets people film a video of the Dodge crossing the one million mile mark. Kelly tries to find Waldo, while Bud tries to make out with a girl.
176	19	"Field of Screams"	Gerry Cohen	Al Aidekman	February 27, 1994	819	16.8
Al protests against the destruction of the Polk High football field. Meanwhile, Buck and Bud are featured in a Verminator commercial, where they get blasted with an experimental spray that leads to Bud growing breasts and Buck changing into different animals.
177	20	"The D'Arcy Files"	Gerry Cohen	Ilunga Adell	March 27, 1994	820	18.1
Al is offered a $50,000 bribe by a shady businessman to reveal the identity and location of Jefferson, who is revealed to be a former CIA spy in a witness relocation program.
178	21	"Nooner or Nothing"	Gerry Cohen	Nancy Neufeld	April 10, 1994	822	16.0
As a part of a radio contest, women are asked to make their husband do embarrassing things. Peg tries to make Al sing "Wind Beneath My Wings", name her breasts and then come home so they can have a "nooner". She fails in everything. Meanwhile, Bud and Kelly wait in a long line for concert tickets and keep moving back as people exploit their weaknesses. Note: Rick Dees guest stars in a voice-over role as himself.
179	22	"Ride Scare"	Sam W. Orender	Nancy Neufeld	April 24, 1994	825	16.1
Al is forced to carpool by Marcy and her group's green initiative (Cleaner Greener Chicago). His carpool, consisting of him and three plus-sized models, is chosen to promote a campaign to clean up Chicago. Bud makes the Dean's list due to good grades and no one appreciates him as much as they cheer Kelly when she gets a raise. Note: In 2005, TV Land included this episode as part of its '100 Most Unexpected Moments in TV History', ranking it number 73.
180	23	"The Legend of Ironhead Haynes"	Gerry Cohen	Katherine Green	May 1, 1994	821	17.1
Al is threatened that he would lose his parking space if he insulted another fat woman. After dodging off Marcy's attempts, he finally ends up insulting a fat woman. He loses his precious parking space, which leads to his men's club "NO MA'AM" seeking out to find a legendary guru, named Ironhead Haynes (guest star Waylon Jennings), and seek his advice on how to battle modern political correctness. Meanwhile, Bud, Kelly and Peggy steal a full refrigerator from a funeral and hide it from Al in the garage.
181	24	"Assault and Batteries"	Sam W. Orender	David Castro	May 8, 1994	824	17.4
In this special 3D episode, Al, who is hoping to get back home in time to watch John Wayne in Hondo, gets trapped in a store at the mall while trying to exchange batteries when the computers go down and lock everything down, including the doors. Peggy, who is outside, goes on a shopping spree. He then hallucinates that he, his family and the D'Arcys are in the old west. Finally, in a fit of anger and frustration, he grabs a cash register and throws it at the shatterproof window, but it just bounces off and hits him on the head, knocking him out cold. He then awakens at home in time to hear that the next time Hondo will be broadcast is February 18th, 2011. Meanwhile, Kelly and Bud celebrate Buck's birthday after finding his birth certificate in the couch, which Buck hates. Guest stars: Jan Hoag, Jean Speegle Howard, Biff Yeager, Cynthia Frost, Craig Benton, Brian Reddy, Gary Simpson, Cheech Marin and Mike McIntosh.
182	25	"Al Goes Deep"	Amanda Bearse	Garry Bowren & Laurie Lee-Goss	May 15, 1994	826	14.5
Al convinces Jefferson to pool their money and bet Trumane University's homecoming football game to make-up for Jefferson stealing $3,000 of Marcy's tax refund money that Jefferson spent on his expensive clothes. But the star of the football team, named Chad, starts dating Kelly, and it interrupts his training. Al, fearing that he will be killed by mobster bookmakers who have also bet on Chad's team to win, seeks Kelly's help to keep her distance from Chad, but she ends up injuring him. Finally Al plays the game himself. Meanwhile, Peggy goes horribly wrong when she tries to make her own Bonbon.
183	26	"Kelly Knows Something"	Amanda Bearse	Al Aidekman	May 22, 1994	823	13.2
Al auditions to be on a sports trivia show to win $10,000 when his TV breaks down. But when the producer rejects him for having no personality, Al trains the dim-witted Kelly to be a contestant. Todd Christensen guest stars. Note: Amanda Bearse does not appear in this episode.
