= Married... with Children season 9 =

1994–95 season of American TV series

Married... with Children
- Season 9
- DVD cover
- Showrunner: Michael G. Moye
- Starring: Ed O'Neill; Katey Sagal; Amanda Bearse; Christina Applegate; David Faustino; Ted McGinley
- No. of episodes: 26 (& 2 specials)

Release
- Original network: Fox
- Original release: September 4, 1994 – May 21, 1995

Season chronology
- ← Previous; Season 8 Next → Season 10

This is a list of episodes for the ninth season (1994–95) of the television series Married... with Children. The season aired on Fox from September 4, 1994, to May 21, 1995.

This season rounds out the cast of Al's friends by introducing Griff, who works at Gary's Shoes with Al, and Ike. Steve Rhoades also makes his final two appearances during this season. The season also includes the cancellation of Psycho Dad, Bud getting a job as a driving examiner and the first appearances of shoe store owner Gary (who turns out to be a woman), Marcy's niece Amber and reporter Miranda Veracruz de la Hoya Cardinal.

Katey Sagal missed one episode and had short appearances in three episodes. Amanda Bearse also missed one episode.

Episode 24 "Radio Free Trumaine" was a back-door spin-off pilot that was not picked up.

This was the final season for co-creator Michael G. Moye as showrunner; he served as a consultant on the following season before leaving the show thereafter.

== Episodes ==
No. overall	No. in season	Title	Directed by	Written by	Original release date	Prod. code	U.S. viewers (millions)
184	1	"Shoeway to Heaven"	Gerry Cohen	Story by : Carl Studebaker; Teleplay by : Nancy Steen	September 4, 1994	901	15.1
Peggy has moved to Wanker County after her mom suffers a heart attack. After finding a box of old shoes, Al and Jefferson turn the shoe store into a 1970s-themed retro shoe store, which is highly successful at first. Meanwhile, Kelly gets stung multiple times while filming a Verminator commercial, the effects of which acts as a truth serum, making her reveal what she really thinks about herself and her family. Note: Katey Sagal does not appear in this episode due to maternity leave; only her voice is heard over the phone. Guest stars: Tawny Kitaen as Dominique, Terry Murphy as herself
185	2	"Driving Mr. Boondy"	Gerry Cohen	Donald Beck	September 11, 1994	902	14.6
Bud needs $700 for a trip to Milwaukee with the Fraternity, which Al refuses. To earn it, Bud takes up a job as a driving examiner. Due to Peggy's negligence, Al's driver's license has expired and he has to take the test again—with Jefferson's help. Bud takes Al's test and gives him a hard time as a revenge for Al refusing to give him $700. Kelly is upset that she has to do a commercial in a bikini. She protests, loses her job and ends up in Marcy's bank holding up a board in a bikini. Note: Katey Sagal makes a short appearance.
186	3	"Kelly Breaks Out"	Gerry Cohen	Larry Jacobson	September 18, 1994	903	15.8
Kelly gets the part as a sexy spokeswoman for a beer commercial, but freaks out when she gets a pimple and a home-made pimple cream from Wanker makes her bald and gives her a beard. Meanwhile, Marcy protests the crew making the beer commercial for being sexist. Al and Jefferson order tapes of Avengers with Emma Peel from Home Shopping Network. Note: Katey Sagal makes a short appearance.
187	4	"Naughty but Niece"	Gerry Cohen	David Castro	September 25, 1994	904	16.5
Bud needs some quiet time to study for a scholarship exam, so he goes to Al's shoe store and then back home. Marcy and Jefferson announce the arrival of Marcy's niece, Amber (Juliet Tablak). Bud pays off everyone to leave to study but ends up sleeping with Amber. Note: Katey Sagal makes a short appearance.
188	5	"Business Sucks: Part 1"	Gerry Cohen	Richard Gurman	October 2, 1994	905	13.3
Part one of two. NO MA'AM counter-protests against Marcy and company when Al banishes a customer for nursing her baby. Meanwhile, Peg gets stuck on a train during her journey home from Wanker County, and finally comes home to find Al on the news. Kelly becomes the wink-wink girl in a new commercial. Note: This is Teresa Parente's first appearance in the series as Miranda Veracruz de la Hoya Cardinal.
189	6	"Business Still Sucks: Part 2"	Gerry Cohen	Stacie Lipp	October 9, 1994	906	14.3
Conclusion. Al is forced to give up when he realizes that law is with Marcy and the gang. To avoid further issues, Al turns the store into a men's shoe store. Gary, the owner, plans to visit the store, so he paints the men's shoes and passes it off as women's shoes. She gets an idea and turns it into a store for women's shoes, breastfeeding and nursery. Note: This is Janet Carroll's first appearance in the series as Gary.
190	7	"Dial "B" for Virgin"	Amanda Bearse	Wayne Kline	October 16, 1994	907	16.1
Bud is put in charge of a hotline service catering to virgins who feel tempted to have sex before they're ready. He ends up at a virgin's house to talk her out of sex, gets turned on by her and sleeps with her mom. Meanwhile, Al and Peg have problems deciding what movie to rent at the video store, and Al runs into Marcy in the adult section, where she claims she intends to erase the movies she's renting and then return them. One of the movies prominently displayed near the front counter is Dutch.
191	8	"Sleepless in Chicago"	Katherine Green	Katherine Green	October 23, 1994	908	15.7
Kelly becomes a brunette to do a public announcement and be taken seriously. Jefferson gets a nurse Barbie doll and Al gets the first issue of Big 'Uns at an auction, that he purchases with $1,200 of Jefferson's money. They later realize the Barbie is worth $50,000. Jefferson forces Al to lie in bed next to Marcy while Jefferson sneaks out that night to try to take Marcy's valuable Barbie doll and sell it off to a collector. At the same time, Peg is worried that Al is missing.
192	9	"No Pot to Pease In"	Gerry Cohen	John Glenn Houston	November 6, 1994	909	16.3
In this self-referential episode, Kelly pitches her family's and neighbors' quirks and vices as a new premise for a Fox sitcom. After seeing it, everyone (except Al, who is the only one who enjoys the sitcom) protests that the producers copied their lifestyles. The Bundys go to the show's studio in Los Angeles to attempt to get it off the air. Guest cast: George Wyner as Ronald N. Michaels, Leonard Kelly-Young as Mel Pease, Lisa Kaseman as Patty Pease, Steven Hack as Lou, Bruce Fine as Ben Pease, Alex McLeod as Carrie Pease, Jennifer Massey as Marla 'the Pigeon' Darla, J. J. Johnston as Security Guard, Mark Barriere as Washington Darla, Rochelle Swanson as Woman #1, Amber Kelleher-Andrews as Woman #2.
193	10	"Dud Bowl"	Gerry Cohen	Kim Weiskopf	November 13, 1994	910	16.7
When Al and the guys have a wake for a former high school football teammate, a group of guys from a rival high school challenges them to decide the ultimate Chicago city champion. Guest appearances by Bubba Smith (Colts), Jack Reynolds (Rams/49ers), Lawrence Taylor (NY Giants), and Ken Stabler (Raiders).
194	11	"A Man for No Seasons"	Amanda Bearse	Kim Weiskopf	November 27, 1994	911	14.2
When the national baseball league goes on a strike because of payment salary disagreements between players and owners, Al and his men's group NO MA'AM organize their own baseball league sponsored by nudie bars. They are very successful, but finally they also go on strike at the end over TV rights compensations. Features guest appearances by MLB players Mike Piazza (L.A. Dodgers), Bret Saberhagen (New York Mets), Danny Tartabull (New York Yankees), Frank Thomas (Chicago White Sox), Dave Winfield (Minnesota Twins), and MLB player-turned-sportscaster Joe Morgan. Note: This episode is a take on the real-life Major League Baseball strike that ended the 1994 MLB Season very early.
195	12	"I Want My Psycho Dad: Part 1"	Gerry Cohen	Barry Gold	December 11, 1994	913	13.1
Part one of two. Al and his NO MA'AM buddies protest their local TV station when Al's favorite TV show, Psycho Dad, gets cancelled. When no one seems to care in Chicago, they plan to go to Washington D.C.
196	13	"I Want My Psycho Dad: Part 2" "Second Blood"	Gerry Cohen	David Castro	December 18, 1994	914	16.0
Conclusion. Al and his NO MA'AM friends, Jefferson, Griff, Ike, Bob Rooney, and Officer Dan, take their case to have Psycho Dad put back on the air to Washington, D.C. They lie to their wives, but Peg and Marcy find them. Through Jefferson's former CIA connections they address the Senate, but the Psycho Dad ban is not lifted. The kids party hard back home (off-camera) and it makes the national news.
197	14	"The Naked and the Dead, But Mostly the Naked"	Sam W. Orender	Michael G. Moye	January 8, 1995	912	17.8
Peggy and her friends join Al and his friends Jefferson, Ike, Charlie and Bob Rooney for at a visit to the nudie bar to find out why the men spend so much time there. Al plots to take the women there only on Thursdays which is A-Cup Night, so that the men will not get aroused or excited by the small-breasted strippers. Everything goes well at first, until a very large-breasted stripper named 'Rocky Mountains' unexpectedly shows up. Meanwhile, Kelly gets a part in a weight loss commercial and has to drink several bad-tasting weight loss drinks in multiple takes.
198	15	"Kelly Takes a Shot"	Amanda Bearse	Al Aidekman	January 15, 1995	915	17.7
Kelly gets trained in archery to land a role in a commercial. Bud helps Kelly with her work to impress Amber and get her to sleep with him again. Meanwhile, Al dresses up as an owl to scare away a real owl outside his bedroom window.
—	—	"Special: The Best O'Bundy: Married with... Children's 200th Episode Celebration"	Bill Brown	Paul Wales	February 5, 1995	—	19.2
George Plimpton hosts a special 200th episode of Married... with Children featuring clips from past episodes and a look at the actual Married... with Children set.
199	16	"Get the Dodge Outta Hell"	Gerry Cohen	Larry Jacobson	February 5, 1995	917	21.0
On their way to Wanker County, the Bundys stop at the car wash, where Al can't find his car and Marcy, who made Jefferson get a job there, runs into Steve again, who pretends to be a big-shot businessman but turns out to be a chauffeur instead. The Dodge is finally located and is discovered to be red after all the brown dust was washed off, and Al suddenly remembers that he did in fact buy a red and not a brown car. And inside the trunk is an issue of Big 'Uns—with an old picture of Al and his family taken outside their home that he hid inside for safekeeping (it seems that Al really does love his family after all). Michael Faustino guest stars as Mickey, the car wash manager.
200	17	"25 Years and What Have You Got?"	Sam W. Orender	Donald Beck	February 12, 1995	918	16.4
Buck buries the 25th wedding anniversary present that Al bought for Peggy in the backyard, and Al, Bud and Kelly spend hours digging in hopes of finding it. Marcy buys an all-day massage package for Peg as a gift and Peg spends all of Al's gift-money in the beauty shop. As both fail to get gifts, they pretend that they both forgot that it is their anniversary.
201	18	"Ship Happens: Part 1"	Gerry Cohen	Michele J. Wolff	February 19, 1995	919	13.9
Part one of two. After Peggy wins a magazine contest, the Bundys and the D'Arcys go on a cruise, which turns out to be one catering to fat women by day and slim, sexy women by night. Peggy gets a bad hair-do there and stops Al from enjoying the slim, bikini-clad women. Meanwhile, Wolfman Jack (appearing as himself) stays at the Bundy house.
202	19	"Ship Happens: Part 2"	Gerry Cohen	Katherine Green	February 26, 1995	920	17.4
Conclusion. The Bundys, the D'Arcys, a fat woman, and comedian/former SNL cast member Gilbert Gottfried are lost at sea in a life raft after the cruise ship sinks. Gilbert entertains them with his comic antics (which only Jefferson finds funny) and finally Al goes swimming for help. The rest get rescued soon and Al turns up two days later. Meanwhile, the media hounds the kids for stories, including claims that Michael Jackson molested them.
203	20	"Something Larry This Way Comes"	Amanda Bearse	Alison Taylor	March 12, 1995	916	16.5
Al is excited when Kelly hires Larry Storch as her acting coach and they star in a play together, but when Larry Storch gets into an accident involving Gary punching him out for scamming her years earlier, Al must step in to help his daughter.
204	21	"And Bingo Was Her Game-O"	Gerry Cohen	Laurie Lee-Goss & Garry Bowren	March 26, 1995	921	14.6
Peggy takes Marcy along with her to a bingo competition on the bad side of town. Meanwhile, Al and his NO MA'AM buddies Jefferson, Griff, Ike and Bob Rooney taste-test new beers after Girlie-Girl Beer hires Yoko Ono as their newest spokesperson.
205	22	"User Friendly"	Sam W. Orender	Russell Marcus	April 9, 1995	923	10.4
Bud gets involved (and addicted) with a virtual-reality sex experiment designed to make women obsolete, while Amber and Kelly try to figure how to get Bud away from it. Meanwhile, Al's day off from work gets side-tracked when he, Jefferson, Griff, and Bob Rooney try to solve the mystery of what the light switch on the side of the kitchen counter leads to.
206	23	"Pump Fiction"	Gerry Cohen	Kim Weiskopf & David Castro	April 30, 1995	925	12.9
Al and Kelly make a short film about shoes (Sheos), which lands them a $10,000 grant to make another short film. Guest cast: Miles Arreola as Devin, Jennifer Echols as Gwen, Shae Marks as Colleen, Wanda Acuna as Babette, Vene L. Arcoraci as Eileen, Dawn Eason as Darlene, Mark Voland as Alderman Kuczxynski, and Elisha Choice as Justine
—	—	"Special: My Favorite Married"	Bill Brown	—	April 30, 1995	—	12.8
In a special episode, the cast of Married... with Children (Ed O'Neill, Katey Sagal, David Faustino, Christina Applegate, David Garrison, Amanda Bearse and Ted McGinley) discuss their favorite moments from the show.
207	24	"Radio Free Trumaine"	Gerry Cohen	Richard Gurman & Stacie Lipp	May 7, 1995	926	10.5
In this back-door spin-off pilot (which features Bud, Steve Rhoades, and Marcy), two obnoxious college radio DJs, Mark (Andrew Kavovit) and Oliver (Eric Dane), are expelled by Steve Rhoades for suggesting that Rhoades got his dean job through blackmail, since he had been a chauffeur only two months before (in the episode "Get the Dodge Outta Hell"). Marcy arrives at the radio station looking for April (Keri Russell), a new bank employee who is romantically entangled with both Bud and a giant Russian basketball star named Nikolai. She decides to protest against Steve and get him fired. Note: David Garrison in his final appearance.
208	25	"Shoeless Al"	Amanda Bearse	Bootsie^{[A]}	May 14, 1995	924	10.5
When an armed robber breaks into the shoe store after hours and leaves Al physically tied up in the back of the store all night, he then slaps the mall with a phony lawsuit saying that he has been traumatized by the burglary and can't be around shoes anymore. To bring credibility to the lawsuit, Al cannot wear shoes for one week. But with the bowling finals that week with his friends, he has to choose between the lawsuit settlement and bowling. Guest cast: Mary-Pat Green as Marie-Pat, Charlie Dell as Leslie Baum, Michael Rothhaar as Milt, Susan Varon as Brenda, Mike Finneran as Marv, and Gary Buckner as Bowler #2
209	26	"The Undergraduate"	Amanda Bearse	Fran E. Kaufer	May 21, 1995	922	13.9
Kelly gets a secret admirer who turns out to be a wealthy but spoiled 12-year-old boy who blackmails her into accompanying him to his prom at his elementary school. Note: Amanda Bearse does not appear in this episode.

== DVD release ==
This season was included with every other season on a boxset from Sony Pictures Home Entertainment. On August 19, 2009, it was released on an individual set.

The DVD was first released in Australia on October 22, 2008, by Sony Pictures Home Entertainment, without any bonus features.

== Note ==
A. 'Bootsie' is a pseudonym for J. Stanford Parker.
