= List of Still Standing episodes =

The following is a list of episodes for the CBS comedy television series Still Standing. All episodes in this show except for “Pilot” start with the word “Still”.

== Series overview ==
Season	Episodes	Originally released	
Season	Episodes	First released	Last released
1	22	September 30, 2002	May 12, 2003
2	23	September 22, 2003	May 24, 2004
3	23	September 20, 2004	May 23, 2005
4	20	September 21, 2005	March 8, 2006

== Episodes ==
=== Season 1 (2002–03) ===
No. overall	No. in season	Title	Directed by	Written by	Original release date	Prod. code	U.S. viewers (millions)
1	1	"Pilot"	Andrew D. Weyman	Diane Burroughs & Joey Gutierrez	September 30, 2002	1AGK79	18.06
Linda comes over with her new psychologist boyfriend, who teaches them an exercise that proves honesty is the best policy in a relationship. When Judy and Bill decide to put his philosophy to the test, they realize that maybe some things should be left unsaid. Meanwhile, Bill tries to help Brian with his girl problems by telling him they prefer boys who seem dangerous, which leads Brian to think that smoking might get a certain girl's attention.
2	2	"Still Reading"	Andrew D. Weyman	Allison Adler	October 7, 2002	1AGK01	14.89
In an effort to stimulate her brain, Judy starts to host a book club. Bill makes fun until he picks up the book the club reads one week. Soon, he is offering his own enlightened input into the group, and Judy questions her role as the "smart one." Note: This episode was dedicated to Joe Gutierrez.
3	3	"Still in School"	Andrew D. Weyman	Diane Burroughs & Joey Gutierrez	October 14, 2002	1AGK02	15.75
Bill and Judy attend their 20th high-school reunion, and soon they begin acting like teenagers again. Bill meets his old hot-dog eating competitor and challenges him to see who can eat more pancakes at the reunion breakfast, while Judy glumly notes that the most popular girl at school has become a successful architect and has a "perfect life." Meanwhile, Linda scores a date with an ex-boyfriend.
4	4	"Still Rocking"	Andrew D. Weyman	Ed Yeager	October 21, 2002	1AGK04	16.60
As her 13th birthday approaches, Bill tries to help Lauren get the attention of a boy she likes but only ends up humiliating her. Judy fixes things by arranging an outing to a blink-182 concert, where Lauren is subjected to new, bigger humiliations. This was Vanessa Hudgens's television debut.
5	5	"Still Volunteering"	Andrew D. Weyman	Regina Stewart	October 28, 2002	1AGK03	15.54
Bill and Judy fall asleep at Tina's recital, shaming them into volunteering at her school, but their good intentions quickly go awry.
6	6	"Still Cheering"	Andrew D. Weyman	Richard Gurman	November 4, 2002	1AGK06	15.38
Brian joins the school football team but quits because the other kids are picking on him. He decides to do cheerleading instead, but Bill is unsure about Brian's decision. Judy tells Bill that they need to try to support him, whatever he does. In the end, Bill is pleased to learn that Brian became a cheerleader to get closer to the girls.
7	7	"Still Cheating"	Andrew D. Weyman	Ben Wexler	November 11, 2002	1AGK05	16.21
Bill becomes fast friends with Linda's ultra-cool new boyfriend, but Linda breaks up with him and Bill is forced to lie to keep their friendship alive. Meanwhile Judy lies to avoid doing lame activities with Linda.
8	8	"Still Family"	Andrew D. Weyman	Ed Yeager	November 18, 2002	1AGK07	14.73
Irked that Linda seems to be more involved with her boyfriend's family than her own, Judy resolves to have a weekly family night, and is met with heavy resistance. They go bowling, and Bill rushes between his family and tryouts.
9	9	"Still Thankful"	Andrew D. Weyman	Ben Wexler	November 25, 2002	1AGK08	16.32
Judy's steadily bickering parents visit for Thanksgiving, then announce that they're extending their stay by one week. Linda tackles cooking the traditional turkey dinner in hopes of winning some praise, while Bill regrets teaching Judy's father his technique for dealing with marital spats.
10	10	"Still Scalping"	Andrew D. Weyman	Austin Winsberg & Adam F. Goldberg	December 9, 2002	1AGK10	14.60
Judy takes Bill's advice to feign a shared interest with her boss to get a promotion--and gets opera tickets that she and Bill quickly regret selling to get Blackhawks tickets. Meanwhile, Linda happily volunteers to chaperone Lauren's sleepover but ends up being busted for making prank phone calls.
11	11	"Still Spending"	Andrew D. Weyman	Allison Adler	December 16, 2002	1AGK09	14.62
Bill lends money to a deadbeat co-worker for a TV, just as Judy needs quick cash to get a new water heater. It turns out that Bill made a loan to a guy who never pays people back, and the Millers get behind on their bills.
12	12	"Still Bullying"	Andrew D. Weyman	Jayne Hamil & Carla Filisha	January 6, 2003	1AGK11	15.74
Lauren is prohibited from attending her first school dance as a punishment for bullying, which Judy recalled falling victim to as a teen, but Bill lets slip that Judy was actually the aggressor.
13	13	"Still Good Cop"	Andrew D. Weyman	Ben Wexler	January 27, 2003	1AGK12	13.50
Tired of always being the parent who lays down rules and metes out punishment, Judy makes Bill take over the 'bad cop' role. When Bill tires of this, he reverts to being a 'good cop,' but Judy refuses to become 'bad cop' again. The children quickly take advantage.
14	14	"Still Scoring"	Andrew D. Weyman	Ed Yeager	February 3, 2003	1AGK13	15.80
Linda's athletic boyfriend makes Bill want to prove he can still be active, so he joins an inline hockey league. Meanwhile, Judy tries to keep up with Bill by taking a spinning class. The two suffer but try to tough it out and hide their pain from each other.
15	15	"Still Romancing"	Andrew D. Weyman	Regina Stewart	February 10, 2003	1AGK14	13.82
After a failed Valentine's Day, Bill and Judy pick a day to make surprise romantic gestures to each other. Bill writes Judy a dirty note that finds its way into Brian's lunchbag, while Judy wears a trench coat to work with nothing underneath--and is taken to security and examined. Meanwhile, Brian looks to his parents for advice about a girl he likes and also gets sent to the principal's office about that dirty note in his lunchbag.
16	16	"Still Hairdressing"	Andrew D. Weyman	Ben Wexler	February 17, 2003	1AGK18	13.05
Bill must repair the damage when his tactless comments get Judy blacklisted from her hairdresser, then he runs afoul again by going to that hairdresser himself.
17	17	"Still Excelling"	Andrew D. Weyman	Allison Adler	March 10, 2003	1AGK15	15.86
Bill and Judy decide to help Lauren with her science project to show her that they care about what she's doing. They end up doing the whole thing, then regret it when the teacher moves her to the honors class, which increases her workload.
18	18	"Still Sisters"	Andrew D. Weyman	Richard Gurman	March 31, 2003	1AGK16	15.21
When Linda meets a nice man and goes out with him hours after being dumped by another guy, Judy advises her not to go so fast. The sisters fight and Linda accuses Judy of always nosing in on her life. Judy decides to let her sister live her own life, but with all the extra time of her hands she turns to overcontrolling her children's lives. When they can't take it anymore, Bill decides to get the two back together and establish peace in the family.
19	19	"Still Changing"	Andrew D. Weyman	Richard Gurman	April 14, 2003	1AGK19	14.14
When Bill's friend Weezer visits, Bill and Judy try to prove that they haven't changed since they got married, so Judy decides to go out with her old friend Sandy and Linda (nicknamed Pimples).
20	20	"Still Petting"	Andrew D. Weyman	Adam Waring	April 28, 2003	1AGK17	14.41
When Judy agrees to house her divorcing boss' prized dog, Bill's lazy habits turn it into a slothful shell of the dog it once was.
21	21	"Still Mom"	Andrew D. Weyman	Ed Yeager	May 5, 2003	1AGK20	15.50
When Bill's mother visits, Judy's advice on dealing with her constant barrage of guilt trips backfires when she runs away. First appearance of Sally Struthers.
22	22	"Still Partying"	Andrew D. Weyman	Story by : Austin Winsberg & Adam F. Goldberg; Teleplay by : Regina Stewart	May 12, 2003	1AGK21	15.46
With Brian upset over not getting an invitation to a cheerleader's party, but Lauren getting one, his story of woe prompts Bill to relate a tale from his own youth when he crashed a party and pretended to drink a lot of beer. Later, Bill and Judy cut short their fun at an AC/DC concert to make sure that Lauren hasn't disobeyed them by sneaking off to the bash until she is caught sneaking kids out of the basement from other parties.

=== Season 2 (2003–04) ===
No. overall	No. in season	Title	Directed by	Written by	Original release date	Prod. code	U.S. viewers (millions)
23	1	"Still Negotiating"	Gerry Cohen	Diane Burroughs & Joey Gutierrez	September 22, 2003	2AGK01	12.66
After Judy and Bill order Lauren to drop basic math and take a more difficult algebra class, her bad attitude about schoolwork multiplies and the conflict between Lauren and her parents intensifies. Then Judy and Bill try to use the art of negotiation.
24	2	"Still Driving"	Gerry Cohen	Ben Wexler	September 29, 2003	2AGK02	13.43
Bill finds out that Brian has been taking driver's ed and excitedly decides to teach him how to drive before his 16th birthday, but Brian prefers that his more laid-back mother would give the lessons.
25	3	"Still the Bad Parents"	Katy Garretson	Regina Stewart	October 6, 2003	2AGK04	11.61
When Judy finally has a good idea at a PTA meeting, the attention she receives from the group's president, Elise Larkin, encourages her and Bill to become more responsible parents. After being invited to the Larkins' backyard barbecue, they go a step too far by voicing their concerns that the Larkins' son Dorian might be having sex--only to learn that they need to be concerned about their own son's activities.
26	4	"Still Our Kids"	Gerry Cohen	Tom Martin	October 13, 2003	2AGK03	12.22
When Brian and Lauren get jobs and bond with their bosses, Bill andJudy feel jealous and overlooked when they realizes that their kids are doing all sorts of things with their bosses that they normally wouldn't do--or never did--with them. They're shocked that the Logan gave Lauren a cell phone and a ski trip in Aspen on which she is not going because of an au pair, while Brian receives tickets for a White Sox game, which greatly upsets his Cubs-supporting parents.
27	5	"Still Got It"	John Tracy	Ed Yeager	October 20, 2003	2AGK05	12.16
When Lauren feels miserable because she didn't get a part in school dance show, Bill and Judy go down to the school to work things out. When Bill meets an old classmate, now the drama teacher, Lauren gets a part in the play, and Bill thinks it's because the teacher still has a crush on him.
28	6	"Still Shoplifting"	John Tracy	Richard Gurman	October 27, 2003	2AGK06	14.17
Judy's fear that Lauren is hanging out with the wrong crowd is confirmed when Lauren gets caught shoplifting. Although Judy doesn't believe Lauren's claim of innocence, Bill convinces her to give their daughter the benefit of the doubt. When it seems that Lauren has stolen again, Bill and Judy's parenting abilities are pushed to the limit until they realize Lauren was simply returning her own birthday present. Meanwhile Linda uses Tina for a psychology class.
29	7	"Still Our Little Boy"	Gerry Cohen	Tim Doyle	November 3, 2003	2AGK07	12.08
Brian's overuse of cologne is revealed to be due to skipping showers after gym. When Bill confronts him, he finds out Brian is self-conscious about his manhood, but not exactly in the way Bill thinks.
30	8	"Still Interfering"	Gerry Cohen	Austin Winsberg & Adam F. Goldberg	November 10, 2003	2AGK08	13.09
Eager to relive their glory days, chaperones Bill and Judy are excited about a teen dance with an '80s theme. The same can't be said of Brian, who's dateless after following his mom's relationship advice. When Brian stands up for himself Bonnie dumps him, and Judy's attempts to reunite them backfire when Bonnie goes to the dance with Chad. Meanwhile, Bill gives a few pointers on the birds and bees to a football player, who then makes a move on Lauren. The episode ends with Judy accidentally kills Tina's new gerbil with the vacuum cleaner.
31	9	"Still Dreaming"	Randy Cordray	Adam Waring	November 17, 2003	2AGK10	13.60
Bill gets Lauren to profile Linda for a school report on role models, which leads to Lauren helping Linda fulfill her dream of designing and selling fashion for goose lawn ornaments. Judy becomes jealous of the time that they're spending together and spitefully dismisses their business venture.
32	10	"Still Believing"	John Tracy	Regina Stewart	November 24, 2003	2AGK11	12.88
Lauren has been sneaking out of the house early on Sunday mornings, and Bill and Judy are suspicious. They find out that she is going to church with her boyfriend and his parents, who are very religious. When the Halversons invite the whole family over, the Millers discover that the Halversons' brand of "fun" includes a lengthy sing-along and a murder-mystery dinner game. After receiving an invitation to a performance of "Godspell" featuring the family, Bill and Judy sneak off to Ozzfest instead, then feel guilty when they notice a figurine of Jesus Christ in their kitchen. After speaking to a man they think is a priest, Bill and Judy make amends with the Halversons.
33	11	"Still Christmas"	Gerry Cohen	Jayne Hamil & Carla Filisha	December 15, 2003	2AGK09	13.55
Judy is excited to host Christmas in the Miller home for the first time, but her plans are scrapped when Bill's mom insists on having Christmas dinner for the entire family in her tiny apartment. Bill buys her a portable keyboard to have Christmas at his place, but Louise has bought a piano and offers lessons every Saturday; when Bill turns down the piano it ends up at his mom's house. Louise accidentally drops the crown roast then puts the ham she brought on the piano. Meanwhile, Linda's good deed for Christmas is making over her helpless co-worker and goes better than planned.
34	12	"Still Responsible"	John Tracy	Ben Wexler	January 5, 2004	2AGK12	13.55
To give Bill and Judy a much-needed break, Judy's parents come to take the kids for the weekend but decide to stay when they realize Judy is sick. Having forgotten the joy of being taken care of, Judy conveniently extends her illness a little longer but gets into trouble when her parents find out she is faking.
35	13	"Still Narcing"	Henry Chan	Austin Winsberg	February 2, 2004	2AGK13	12.08
To Bill's delight, Brian becomes popular when he becomes the basketball team's statistician, but then he discovers that the players are making Brian their "errand boy." He tries to help by planning a prank, but it backfires, and Judy comes to the rescue.
36	14	"Still Bill's Dad"	Robert Berlinger	Tom Martin	February 9, 2004	2AGK14	12.34
While visiting from Florida, Bill's macho father decides he wants to spend some quality time with his son so he makes plans to re-create a past bowhunting trip he took Bill on as a boy to toughen him up; Brian sharpens his math skills as he prepares to compete in the Math Olympics.
37	15	"Still Flirting"	Robert Berlinger	Ed Yeager	February 16, 2004	2AGK15	12.39
Judy discovers that "boys' night out" consists of flirting with a waitress at the local restaurant. Bill accuses Judy of being jealous – until he learns of her flirtation with the mailman.
38	16	"Still Groping"	John Tracy	Richard Gurman	February 23, 2004	2AGK16	12.65
When Louise announces she has a boyfriend; Bill is ecstatic that she has someone new to occupy her time. The Millers arrange to have dinner with him, during which they start to put aside their worries about him – until he squeezes Judy's bottom. Bill is torn between telling his mother the truth and being free of her meddling ways.
39	17	"Still Parading"	Jeff Meyer	Adam Waring	March 1, 2004	2AGK18	10.97
Jealous of his friend's relationship with his athletic son (especially after discovering that he is perfectly fine with his son being gay), Bill tries to bond with Brian by helping him build a St. Patrick's Day parade float, only to modify and destroy it. Meanwhile, Lauren dreads the humiliation she'll suffer when the uncoordinated Judy performs her Irish River Dance at the parade. Both kids get surprises: Bill dresses as a leprechaun to replace the figures he destroyed, and Judy finds that she becomes a great dancer after drinking Tina's cough medicine.
40	18	"Still Stressing"	Leonard R. Garner Jr.	Michael Bornhorst	March 22, 2004	2AGK17	12.07
To pay for a tutor to help him study for the PSAT, a stressed-out Brian takes a job with Bill and runs circles around him and his slothful co-workers. But Bill and his buddies soon have him slacking off, and Judy steps in: she forces Bill to take a test for a promotion to show the value of hard work. Meanwhile, Linda uses Lauren to nab a divorced father with a son.
41	19	"Still the Man"	Henry Chan	Story by : Ari Eisner; Teleplay by : Ari Eisner & Richard Gurman	April 19, 2004	2AGK19	10.59
When Tina comes running to Judy to do the "manly job" of killing a spider, Bill realizes that Judy's the one who wears the pants in the Miller household, doing all the jobs he should (stereotypically) do. Bill decides to prove that he is indeed the manlier Miller by replacing Tina's broken dollhouse all by himself. But after a game of basketball with Lauren, Bill throws the ball to Judy, who falls backwards into Tina's fixed dollhouse. Meanwhile, Lauren gets conflicting advice about dealing with her new boyfriend from Bill, Judy, and Linda.
42	20	"Still Hangin' Out"	Leonard R. Garner Jr.	Regina Stewart	May 3, 2004	2AGK20	10.95
When Lauren and her friends start hanging out in the Halversons' cool "teen scene" basement, Judy becomes jealous and starts a competition by creating a cooler teen hang-out in the Millers' garage.
43	21	"Still in Cahoots"	Mark Cendrowski	Ed Yeager	May 10, 2004	2AGK21	11.08
Bill and Judy grow suspicious when Brian and Lauren start secretly making plans and covering up for each other. To get to the bottom of things, Bill and Judy start snooping and uncover fake IDs, a box of cash, and a receipt from a tattoo parlor. It turns out that Brian gambles outline with an insert message and accepts an award for journalism.
44	22	"Still Champions"	Mark Cendrowski	Ben Wexler	May 17, 2004	2AGK22	9.15
When Tina is invited to a birthday party for the daughter of former Chicago Bear Willie Gault, she refuses to go, but Judy and Bill attend to meet their childhood hero. When Bill accidentally walks out with Gault's Super Bowl ring, the Millers get a chance to live the high life when merchants think Bill is a former Super Bowl winner. Bill and Judy notice that a diamond is missing from it and go to replace it, but it turns out that the stone fell out years ago.
45	23	"Still Seceding"	John Tracy	Ben Wexler	May 24, 2004	2AGK23	12.14
When Brian is grounded for breaking curfew, he decides to move into the garage so he can live by his own rules. Meanwhile, Lauren's night-time snoring is keeping them up and wearying them, and Linda decides to help an uninterested Tina earn Bluebell Girl badges in an attempt to relive her youth. This episode features Renee Olstead's singing skills.

=== Season 3 (2004–05) ===
No. overall	No. in season	Title	Directed by	Written by	Original release date	Prod. code	U.S. viewers (millions)
46	1	"Still Scamming"	Gerry Cohen	Ed Yeager	September 20, 2004	3AGK01	11.11
As Bill and Judy repeatedly embarrass Brian when he tries to visit colleges, Lauren becomes exceptionally moody. Linda, eager to prove she understands teen psychology, insists that Lauren is suffering from depression. Hearing this Lauren and Brian compete to take advantage of the situation: Bill and Judy lavish attention (and money) on Lauren, which allows Brian to visit colleges on his own terms. But when Tina reveals the truth, Bill and Judy devise a revenge campaign.
47	2	"Still Neighbors"	Gerry Cohen	Richard Gurman	September 27, 2004	3AGK02	10.83
When a lesbian couple moves in next door, Bill and Judy are shameless in their quest to get approval to build the deck of their dreams. But when they fail to make nice with the couple, they decide to use Lauren to score points and convince her to go out with the neighbors' nerdy son Chris.
48	3	"Still Looking for Love"	John Tracy	Diane Burroughs & Joey Gutierrez	October 4, 2004	3AGK04	10.75
When Linda dons a cat costume for Halloween, and dresses her cat, Nathaniel Pawthorne, as a mouse, Nathaniel sees himself in a full-length mirror, charges full speed at his reflection and kills himself. Judy suggests that the heartbroken Linda channel her sadness into finding a boyfriend, which she successfully does with a man named Perry. But Bill and Judy notice that Linda treats Perry more like a feline than a beau; meanwhile, they can't help making fun of the strange circumstances of Nathaniel Pawthorne's death.
49	4	"Still Winning"	John Tracy	Adam F. Goldberg	October 11, 2004	3AGK03	10.78
Bill mocks Brian's interest in a fantasy collectible card game until he learns the collection's value, and that Brian's a top player. Meanwhile, Judy starts doing things with Fitz when Linda's wedding preparations make her unavailable.
50	5	"Still Auctioning"	John Tracy	Ellen Byron & Lissa Kapstrom	October 18, 2004	3AGK05	10.02
When the Halversons belittle Bill and Judy's ability to contribute to the school's silent auction, the Millers retaliate by coming up with the hit item. Impressed with the Millers' generosity, the Halversons offer to help Bill and Judy run the event that they donated. But they back out on then, and the Millers take revenge.
51	6	"Still Cooking"	Bob Koherr	Ben Wexler	October 25, 2004	3AGK06	11.00
Bill shows Fitz that he has picked up some cooking skills from late-night TV shows. Judy discovers Bill's talents in the kitchen and recruits him to start making dinner; though initially reluctant, Bill eventually warms to the job and cooks delicious meals for the family. At first, Judy is thrilled to have some time off from housework, but she can't stop imagining Bill fussing over food when the two try to be intimate.
52	7	"Still Going First"	Bob Koherr	Regina Stewart	November 8, 2004	3AGK07	10.77
When Bill gets a clean bill of health and Judy is advised that her cholesterol is through the roof, she writes a beautiful letter to him conveying things he should know when she's gone; she begs him to do the same, but he finds he needs someone else to inspire him. Meanwhile, Linda borrows Tina to help her fiancé Perry become more comfortable with children.
53	8	"Still Cruising"	John Tracy	Adam Waring	November 15, 2004	3AGK08	11.23
Judy expresses a desire to have a better relationship with Bill's mother, who dupes her into accepting a cruise invitation; Judy calls Louise a bloodsucker in front of her friends. Meanwhile, Brian and Lauren compete to be the entertainment at Tina's birthday party.
54	9	"Still Shallow"	John Tracy	Carla Filisha	November 22, 2004	3AGK09	11.18
Brian has a new girlfriend, but he also has a crush on her hot friend. Bill and Judy both have their own thoughts on how Brian should handle his love triangle. Judy wants her son to do the right thing, while Bill, speaking from experience called pulling a Murphy, advises Brian to stay with his plain girlfriend (Brenda) to appear sensitive and score the hottie (Kaitlin). Brian listens to Bill's advice and when Brenda finds out she breaks up with Brian and tells him another boy likes her. Then Linda tells him about when Judy displayed shallowness in pretending to like classmate Dana to get close to her cute brother. Meanwhile, Tina retaliates against Linda for scaring her.
55	10	"Still Lying"	Mark Cendrowski	Jayne Hamil	November 29, 2004	3AGK10	10.41
Asked to record Tina's ballet recital, Bill can't take the camera off her sexy teacher. Each caught by their wives with the tape, Bill and Fitz blame each other, but when their wives reconcile from a past grievance, their web of lies threatens to unravel. Meanwhile, Brian starts spending a lot of time with Linda.
56	11	"Still Fast"	Asaad Kelada	Ed Yeager	December 13, 2004	3AGK11	10.10
After Bill catches Lauren's boyfriend sneaking out of the house after midnight, he decides to bond with Chris to gain his respect and ensure that he's less likely to disrespect his daughter. Then Chris reveals to Bill that Lauren is the one who wants things to move faster, and the Millers put their parenting skills to work.
57	12	"Still Bonding"	Joel Murray	Ellen Byron & Lissa Kapstrom	January 3, 2005	3AGK13	11.37
On a father-daughter outing to the mall, Bill and Lauren agree to lie to Judy about spending quality time together, then split up to do their own things--until Bill catches Lauren at a sleazy club called the Tom-Tom Room. Meanwhile, Judy tries on Linda's wedding dress, then accidentally sits on a bowl of pudding and must take the dress to be dry-cleaned.
58	13	"Still Advising"	John Tracy	Ben Wexler	January 17, 2005	3AGK14	11.08
Bill convinces Linda to take his advice instead of Judy's about letting her fiancé pursue his dream of making a music video although he hasn't written the song yet; Perry postpones the wedding so he can become a rock star. Meanwhile, Brian agrees to let Lauren give him a makeover to impress a girl, but she sneezes and accidentally shaves off part of one of his eyebrows. Bill listens to Perry's wedding song and realizes that it's awful.
59	14	"Still Drinking"	Jeff McCracken	Adam F. Goldberg	January 31, 2005	3AGK12	10.22
After Bill and Judy catch Brian, Lauren, and their friends drinking in the basement, they decide to set an example and abstain from drinking for an entire month. Unfortunately, Bill and Judy's infamously wild Super Bowl party takes place during that time. Brian and Lauren are impressed that their parents have gone alcohol-free for a solid three weeks, but when Super Bowl Sunday dawns, the "holiday" might be too much for Bill and Judy to handle sober.
60	15	"Still Single"	Gerry Cohen	Richard Gurman	February 7, 2005	3AGK16	10.19
When Fitz's wife walks out on him, Bill and Judy come to the rescue by joining him at his cousin's bachelor pad and helping him pick up women at a bar by pretending that they're all single. Meanwhile, Linda's overwhelmed taking care of the kids as Bill and Judy's outings become nightly events. When Fitz and his wife reconcile, Bill and Judy, enjoying their freedom, still pretend to be single for their new friend Denise, but the plan backfires when Linda comes after them with the kids.
61	16	"Still Not the One"	Gerry Cohen	Regina Stewart	February 14, 2005	3AGK15	9.68
Bill and Judy are so ecstatic to hear that Bill's mother Louise is marrying her boyfriend that Judy agrees to be her maid of honor, but Louise's ex-husband Al shows up wanting to stop the wedding and win her back. Meanwhile, Linda is disheartened when Perry continues to postpone their wedding to put his music career first.
62	17	"Still Helping Out"	Gerry Cohen	Carla Filisha	February 21, 2005	3AGK17	9.51
Brian helps a woman in need as part of his outreach project and Bill willingly lends a hand when he discovers that 'old' Mrs. Grundy is a hottie. When Judy catches Brian and Bill staring at the beautiful Mrs. Grundy, Judy orders Bill to have a serious talk with Brian about not leering at women. Meanwhile, Linda contemplates Perry's request to spice up their sex life outside of the bedroom.
63	18	"Still Admiring"	Mark Cendrowski	Adam F. Goldberg	March 7, 2005	3AGK20	9.22
Brian is excited and filled with confidence when he receives instant messages from Lauren's hot tutor Sarah, a smart college student. Bill encourages Brian to ask her to the upcoming high-school dance, but it backfires when Lauren and her friend send secret e-mails. However, just as Brian is about to make his move, his family manages to suck the joy out of the moment yet again. Meanwhile, Tina is practicing the baton.
64	19	"Still the Boss"	Mark Cendrowski	Ben Wexler	March 21, 2005	3AGK21	10.21
The guys down at the toilet department get a new boss (Ben Savage)--a young, brash, Harvard graduate who develops a friendship with Brian. Bill shamelessly benefits from the situation until Judy steps in and leaves no question that she's still the boss. Meanwhile, Tina and her mysterious new friend frustrate Lauren.
65	20	"Still Holding"	Mark Cendrowski	Adam F. Goldberg	April 18, 2005	3AGK22	9.06
When Bill and Judy discover that their pediatrician has the teddy bear that they used to hide their marijuana stash in, they scheme to get it back. Meanwhile, Brian helps Linda sell her car, but she's overly picky about who's worthy to be its new owner.
66	21	"Still Mother's Day"	Gary Shimokawa	Adam Waring	May 2, 2005	3AGK18	9.96
Judy tries to stand her ground when Bill's mother tries to horn in on a Michaels family Mother's Day tradition, while Lauren resists taking any part of it. In her frustration, Judy repeatedly hurts Louise by accident, which culminates in her knocking the older woman down a flight of stairs. When the family visits Louise in the hospital, Lauren points out that Judy is manipulating her to participate in family traditions just like Louise does, which prompts some soul-searching.
67	22	"Still Getting Married"	Mark Cendrowski	Regina Stewart	May 23, 2005	3AGK19	8.49
Bill and Judy are initially happy that Linda and Perry are finally tying the knot, but when Roach, the eccentric minister and best man, shows up and the other wedding details are unveiled, Judy thinks her sister might be making a big mistake when she finds out that Roach is dragging her to Reno.
68	23	"Still Exchanging"	Gerry Cohen	Terry Mulroy	May 23, 2005	3AGK23	9.83
Bill gets jealous when Brian becomes excited about his upcoming trip to Italy for a summer exchange program. To create a bonding moment with his son before he departs, Bill plans a last-minute camping trip, but when Brian arrives late to leave on the excursion, the two have a falling out.

=== Season 4 (2005–06) ===
No. overall	No. in season	Title	Directed by	Written by	Original release date	Prod. code	U.S. viewers (millions)
69	1	"Still Losin' It"	Gerry Cohen	Ben Wexler	September 21, 2005	4AGK01	6.91
Brian has returned from his summer abroad and should be excited about starting his senior year, but he can't stop thinking about the girl he met--and had sex with--in Italy. Bill takes him to the cigar shop and when Brian runs out because of his asthma, Bill hears that Monica is a sex scam artist. Meanwhile, Linda's so desperate to keep Perry from a long-term gig on the road that she resorts to injuring him to keep him in town.
70	2	"Still Using"	Gerry Cohen	Richard Gurman	September 28, 2005	4AGK04	8.58
When Lauren starts taking advantage of neighbor Chris’ affections, Judy lets him know that he is being used. Chris then directs his crush to Judy, who takes advantage to get work done around the house--but he was using her.
71	3	"Still Selling Out"	Gerry Cohen	Ed Yeager	October 5, 2005	4AGK02	6.98
When a beer-company heir moves into the neighborhood, Bill has found a new best friend, but Judy gets fed up and makes Bill choose between them. Meanwhile, Tina starts copying Lauren's outfits every day.
72	4	"Still Beauty & the Geek"	Gerry Cohen	Ellen Byron & Lissa Kapstrom	October 12, 2005	4AGK05	7.48
When Judy and Linda go to traffic school together, Linda is suddenly the popular one. Meanwhile, after fetching Lauren from a college party she sneaked out to, Brian forces her to be his slave, and when Bill catches him, he makes both of them his slaves. During their labors, they find their mom's old karaoke machine that Bill had claimed got stolen.
73	5	"Still Irresponsible"	Gerry Cohen	Adam F. Goldberg	October 19, 2005	4AGK03	6.98
After scolding Bill and Kyle for their childish behavior, Judy must swallow her pride and ask Kyle for help when she makes an irresponsible mistake that keeps her from mailing Brian's Trifton college application; he finds out and decides on another college. Kyle invites Bill, Brian, and Fitz to his place.
74	6	"Still Aging"	Bob Koherr	Adam Waring	November 2, 2005	3AGK24	6.78
When Judy tells Bill to take her mother to the eye doctor, her mother convinces Bill to go to a casino instead. When Judy finds out, Bill asks Judy if her insistence about the appointment the result of her own fear is of getting old, as her 40th birthday is just days away. Meanwhile, the kids don't know what to get their mom for her birthday.
75	7	"Still Bill Vol. 1"	Gerry Cohen	Ben Wexler	November 9, 2005	4AGK06	7.79
Bill's dad has a new fiancée, Joy, whose 9-year-old son receives all of Bill's dad's attention; meanwhile Joy irks Judy and Linda with her hyper-optimistic personality.
76	8	"Still the Fun One"	Lynn McCracken	Chris Bishop & Terry Mulroy	November 23, 2005	4AGK08	8.03
When Bill and Judy finally meet a couple, they both really enjoy, they start competing against each other to see which of them the couple likes best; when they eventually wonder why they don't hear from them, they find them entertaining Fitz and Marion. Meanwhile, Brian makes an interesting discovery when he mixes up his cell phone with Linda's.
77	9	"Still Avoiding Christmas"	Ken Whittingham	Ellen Byron & Lissa Kapstrom	December 14, 2005	4AGK12	6.97
Brian and Lauren scheme to avoid Christmas chores and family togetherness, but when their plan works, they're not as happy as they thought they'd be because they miss Christmas with their family. Lauren pretends to be a waitress at a restaurant. Meanwhile, Linda and Judy find Bill at a jewelry store, but don't realize what he's buying.
78	10	"Still a Team"	Gerry Cohen	Adam Waring	January 11, 2006	4AGK09	8.44
Bill and Judy search for a pair of tickets to The Rolling Stones concert but getting them proves to be more difficult than they'd hoped. Judy struggle to find the tickets but she and Bill pretend to have tickets. Brian did the laundry but didn't know he ruin the Rolling Stones tickets, but Judy found Brian's signed concert tickets to look like their Rolling Stones tickets. Meanwhile, they must put up with Marion expounding on how wonderful her and Fitz's marriage is because they're a team.
79	11	"Still Sweet"	Joel Murray	Cheryl Holliday	January 18, 2006	4AGK07	7.32
Louise's husband kicks in money towards a Sweet Sixteen party for granddaughter Lauren, so she thinks she's entitled to run the show. Meanwhile, Brian struggles to get money for a college application.
80	12	"Still Decorating"	Mark Cendrowski	Cheryl Holliday	January 25, 2006	4AGK10	6.88
Since Perry won't come home to help redecorate, Linda helps Kyle redecorate his place, and some of her choices irk Bill and Judy. Meanwhile, Linda's marriage becomes the subject of Brian and Lauren's wager.
81	13	"Still Flunking"	Joel Murray	Adam F. Goldberg	February 1, 2006	4AGK11	6.44
With Brian facing a failing grade if he can't climb a wall, Bill's attempt to fix the situation ends up hurting rather than helping. Meanwhile, with Johnny in Japan, Louise decides the family should learn crafty skills, such as needlepoint.
82	14	"Still Out of the Loop"	Gerry Cohen	Ed Yeager	February 15, 2006	4AGK14	6.13
Bill tries to become more involved in Lauren's life, but his constant digging in only serves to drive her further away.
83	15	"Still Eighteen"	Gerry Cohen	Carla Filisha	February 22, 2006	4AGK13	5.91
Bill takes Brian out to a gentlemen's club for his 18th birthday but worries when Brian starts spending all his time there. Meanwhile, Linda regrets giving Lauren a poem for her homework when it comes up for winning an award.
84	16	"Still Saying I Love You"	Gerry Cohen	Ben Wexler	February 22, 2006	4AGK15	5.98
Louise winning a car during a taping of The Oprah Winfrey Show puts a rift between her and Judy. Meanwhile, Brian and his meteorology club friends decide how to spend a club surplus.
85	17	"Still Coaching"	Mark Cendrowski	Ellen Byron & Lissa Kapstrom	March 1, 2006	4AGK16	6.19
When Judy's excellent coaching may put Tina's basketball team in the playoffs, Bill tries to get them to lose so he can watch his NBA special on TV instead. Bill finally comes to the basketball game to find the Halversons coaching the other team, which is short on players; Bill suggests that Tina join them, and she agrees. When Bill becomes coach, Judy sabotages the game so she can go to Hawaii with Linda, who's been feeling hurt that her cat prefers Lauren to her. When Bill's team wins, Tina quits the team.
86	18	"Still Bad"	Mark Cendrowski	Adam F. Goldberg	March 1, 2006	4AGK17	6.71
Invited to a potential new boss' home for dinner, Judy desperately tries to get the family to be on their best behavior, but Brian's conflicting desires for both his new girlfriend and her sci-fi memorabilia collection complicate matters.
87	19	"Still Deceitful"	Mark Cendrowski	Jayne Hamil	March 8, 2006	4AGK18	6.88
When Judy discovers Al has told his fiancée that he's a millionaire, Bill confronts him--and finds out he's the one who was fed the lie. Meanwhile, Brian seeks a way to help pay for college. Last appearance of Sally Struthers.
88	20	"Still Graduating"	Mark Cendrowski	Diane Burroughs & Joey Gutierrez	March 8, 2006	4AGK19	7.36
When Brian graduates high school, he plans to move out and Bill and Judy plan to expand their bedroom with his. However, Brian gets the impression they've split and have become swingers. But as the episode ends, they decide to keep the room the same and show Brian he is always welcome at their home. Guest star: Karen Gracey (Passerby), Judith Hoag (Melanie Goldman), William Ragsdale (Dan Goldman)
