= List of Martin episodes =

The episode list for the Fox sitcom Martin. The series ran from August 27, 1992, to May 1, 1997, airing 132 episodes.

== Series overview ==
Season	Episodes	Originally released		Rank	Average viewers (in millions)
Season	Episodes	First released	Last released	Rank	Average viewers (in millions)
1	27	August 27, 1992	May 13, 1993	#41	18.13
2	27	August 22, 1993	May 15, 1994	#64	15.41
3	27	September 1, 1994	May 18, 1995	#92	12.74
4	27	September 9, 1995	May 2, 1996	#104	10.82
5	24	September 5, 1996	May 1, 1997	#110	8.95

== Episodes ==
=== Season 1 (1992–1993) ===
No. overall	No. in season	Title	Directed by	Written by	Original release date	Prod. code	Viewers (millions)
1	1	"Beauty and the Beast"	Stan Lathan	John Bowman	August 27, 1992	9201	15.5
Martin has an argument with Gina after she listens to Martin’s radio show and hears his womanizing remarks. When Martin gets home, she calls him into the room and tells him about what she heard. Martin gives her an attitude, so she threatens to leave him. Consequently, Martin gives in. Then, Martin and Gina make an agreement to make up in front of Martin’s friends (Cole, Shawn, Tommy), and make it look like Martin won the argument. But there’s a catch: Martin has to agree to go to a dinner with her that night.
2	2	"The Gift Rapper"	Stan Lathan	Billy Van Zandt	September 3, 1992	9202	16.2
At work, Martin realizes it is his anniversary and he forgot to get Gina a present. Shawn suggests something practical, like jars, and Stan says get her "the gift that keeps on giving", scanty lingerie. Martin says to both Stan and Shawn a true gift comes from the heart. However, at home when Gina gives Martin a nice gift, he rushes out to a lingerie store before quitting time. Martin has doubts, until he sees something that may be of value based on Gina's earlier recollections.
3	3	"Things I Do for Love"	Tony Singletary	Lisa Rosenthal	September 10, 1992	9203	13.6
Tommy's new relationship with his new girlfriend Danice prompts Martin to take Gina out for a romantic evening at a dance club, called the Savoy club. Meanwhile, Martin makes insensitive remarks and, as a result, receives numerous calls from his listeners stating that he isn't romantic enough.
4	4	"Boyz 'R Us"	Tony Singletary	Bennie R. Richburg, Jr.	September 17, 1992	9204	13.7
When Martin finds out that Gina makes more money than he does, he becomes irate and has major ego problems once the entire city finds out. Now he has to prove to the whole city that he is really the "man" in the relationship.
5	5	"Dead Men Don't Flush"	Chuck Vinson	David Wyatt	September 24, 1992	9205	16.2
Martin’s toilet gets clogged, and Gina persuades him to call a plumber to fix it at a time when Martin invited Cole and Tommy over to watch a basketball game. When the plumber is found motionless, the three men worry he may have died.
6	6	"Forever Sheneneh"	Chuck Vinson	Bentley Kyle Evans	October 1, 1992	9206	15.5
Sheneneh wins a date with Christopher "Kid" Reid on Martin's radio show. Kid arrives at Sheneneh's apartment and learns that she is his biggest fan but her hospitality towards Kid makes him uneasy when she serves malt liquor and makes sexual advances at him. Ultimately, Kid flees out of the apartment and resurfaces at Martin's place where Gina convinces Kid to go back and finish the date. (Christopher "Kid" Reid, Martin Lawrence and Tisha Campbell all starred in the first two House Party films.)
7	7	"The Parents Are Coming"	Chuck Vinson	Billy Van Zandt	October 8, 1992	9209	17.4
Gina wants Martin to meet her conservative parents but Martin's feeling nervous. Wanting to make a good first impression, he takes advice from Tommy, Shawn and Cole.
8	8	"Woman With a Past"	Tony Singletary	John Bowman	October 15, 1992	9208	15.7
Martin becomes jealous after learning that his recent radio show guest, Keith Washington, once dated Gina when they were younger.
9	9	"Baby It's Cole'd in Here"	Tony Singletary	Bennie R. Richburg, Jr.	October 22, 1992	9212	15.6
Cole's parents interrupts Cole's evening with his girlfriend to demand back rent from their son. Following Martin's advice, Cole stands up to his parents but finds himself homeless when he is thrown out of the house. He is forced to move in with Martin, but soon drives Gina insane with his bad manners and disgusting habits.
10	10	"The Night He Came Home"	Gerren Keith	Billy Van Zandt	October 29, 1992	9215	20.4
On Halloween, Martin and his friends gather at his apartment to share scary ghost stories, but they all get scared out of their wits after they perform a séance to communicate with the dead and call forth the spirit of old man Ackerman.
11	11	"The Great Payne Robbery"	Gerren Keith	Bentley Kyle Evans	November 5, 1992	9211	19.0
When Martin's elderly neighbor's apartment is robbed, Martin holds a neighborhood crime watch meeting. When his own apartment becomes the next target, he devises a plan to catch the burglar.
12	12	"Three Men and a Mouse"	Tony Singletary	David Wyatt	November 12, 1992	9210	17.7
When Gina is sleeping over at Martin’s house, she hears noises in the middle of the night. Thinking it’s a robber, she sends Martin to investigate and finds out it’s a mouse. Martin and Gina go to Gina’s apartment until the mouse is removed, while Martin hires an exterminator (Little Richard). The exterminator tries to get rid of the mouse, but the mouse proves too smart for him, so Tommy, Shawn, Cole, and Martin take it into their own hands.
13	13	"Radio Days"	Tony Singletary	Lisa Rosenthal	November 19, 1992	9213	18.4
Stan decides to hire Monica (Kim Fields), a new female co-host for Martin's show to boost the station's ratings. As they work together, Martin finds that he has taken a liking to Monica, and tries to resist the temptation to be with her. Guest appearances by Russ Parr and Wendy Williams. Note: Martin's voice can be heard in the opening credits from this episode during the show's final two seasons, which was performed by Take 6 singers Mark and Joey Kibble.
14	14	"I've Got a Secret"	Tony Singletary	Diane Burroughs & Joey Gutierrez	December 3, 1992	9216	21.6
Martin reveals a secret on WZUP about Pam that Gina tells him. When Pam, Shawn, Tommy and Cole are angry at both of them when they hear it, Martin and Gina find themselves with only two friends left: Martin’s boss Stan and his girlfriend.
15	15	"I Saw Gina Kissing Santa Claus"	Tony Singletary	Jane Milmore & Billy Van Zandt	December 17, 1992	9218	18.6
Cole was supposed to play Santa Claus for the Big Brother Christmas party, but an emergency at the airport held him up. With the kids getting restless, Martin decides to dress as Santa and tell the kids the "first Christmas story", in which Martin and his friends are imagined reenacting the birth of Christ.
16	16	"Do the Fight Thing"	Gerren Keith	Bruce Ferber	January 14, 1993	9217	18.1
Martin’s radio fans love it when Gina and Martin have an argument on the show. Stan sees how things get better when Gina is on the show. When Stan wants to permanently hire Gina as Martin’s co host, Martin goes against the idea.
17	17	"Blackboard Jungle Fever"	Gerren Keith	Jane Milmore & Billy Van Zandt	January 21, 1993	9214	18.2
Martin returns to his elementary school to participate in Career Day, where he sees his favorite third grade teacher, Ms. Trinidad. They decide to go out to eat and catch up on old times, but Ms. Trinidad (Beverly Johnson) is more interested in putting the moves on Martin.
18	18	"The Break Up (Part 1)"	Gerren Keith	John Bowman	February 11, 1993	9219	22.5
19	19	"The Break Up (Part 2)"	Gerren Keith	Jane Milmore & Billy Van Zandt	February 11, 1993	9220	22.5
Martin and Gina fight over Gina's unusual Valentine's Day gift, and the fight escalates out of control until they finally break up. When they try and reconcile, they discover that maybe they are just too different from each other. With Martin and Gina now broken up, they start dating new people. By coincidence, the two couples happen to meet at a restaurant during dinner. Martin is extremely jealous of the fact that Gina is out with another man, and decides to "help" him out when he begins choking on his food.
20	20	"The Break Up (Part 3)"	Gerren Keith	John Bowman	February 18, 1993	9221	22.5
Martin and his new girlfriend Nicole (Lark Voorhies) realize that they both are still in love with their former lovers, and break up. Billy Dee Williams guest stars on Martin's radio show and convinces him that he'd be foolish to lose Gina. Martin barges in on Gina while she's with another man, and tries to win her back. Special Note: Prior to the episode's airing, fans had the chance to influence the script by calling in a hotline to vote on who should initiate the reunification, Gina or Martin. The polls were decided that Martin should be the one to apologize.
21	21	"I'm Not Your Superwoman"	Gerren Keith	Myra J.	February 25, 1993	9207	20.9
Martin gets the flu and he expects Gina to stay at home and take care of him. However, Gina gets fed up with him acting like a baby and comparing her with his mother.
22	22	"Credit Card Blues"	Gerren Keith	Bentley Kyle Evans	March 18, 1993	9222	21.9
Martin and an old friend, Ricky Thompson (Reggie McFadden) get arrested for committing credit card fraud. Gina and the gang quickly scramble to come up with bail money.
23	23	"Jerome's in the House"	Gerren Keith	David Wyatt	April 1, 1993	9223	20.3
After Pam gets dumped by her boyfriend, she decides to go out on a date with somebody "different" out of sheer desperation. She decides to go out with Jerome, the player, even though Cole is trying to ask her out.
24	24	"Your Arms Are Too Short to Box with Martin"	Gerren Keith	Bennie R. Richburg, Jr.	April 22, 1993	9224	17.8
Tommy's new girlfriend Shannon has an ex-lover (Bushwick Bill) that won't let her go. Eventually, he and his gang of thugs confront Tommy and beat him up. Martin and Cole go after these grumpy midgets to avenge Tommy's beating, by throwing their weight around and attempting to bully the patrons in the little people's bar. It is up to Tommy to tell everyone that violence produces nothing except more violence.
25	25	"Variety Show"	Terri McCoy	Story by : Martin Lawrence & John Bowman & Bentley Kyle Evans & David Wyatt; Teleplay by : Myra J. & Bennie R. Richburg, Jr. & Jane Milmore & Billy Van Zandt	April 29, 1993	9226	17.3
Martin is chosen by his radio station manager to be the producer of a charity variety show for AIDS. But in typical Martin Payne fashion, he lets the job go to his head, acts tyrannically on the set, and alienates everyone around him, even Gina. In the end, Martin is left to do the whole show by himself, but he fails miserably.
26	26	"Baby You Can Drive My Car"	Gerren Keith	Diane Burroughs & Joey Gutierrez	May 6, 1993	9225	16.5
Everybody pools together to get a raffle ticket from Roscoe, and wind up winning a brand new SUV. They decide to share it, by assigning each of them to drive on a different day of the week. They all wind up running the vehicle into the ground and have to get rid of it.
27	27	"Checks, Lies and Videotape"	Terri McCoy	Bill Braunstein	May 13, 1993	9227	16.0
Martin and Gina try to expose a crooked preacher, Reverend Leon Lonnie Love (David Alan Grier), as a fraud, after he cons thousands of dollars from his church members, including Mama Payne. To do so, they decide to have Gina lure him to her apartment so she can elicit a confession out of him and then capture it on videotape.

=== Season 2 (1993–1994) ===
No. overall	No. in season	Title	Directed by	Written by	Original release date	Prod. code	Viewers (millions)
28	1	"Do You Remember the Time?"	Gerren Keith	Sandy Frank & Matt Wickline	August 22, 1993	9303	14.5
Martin struggles with coming up with a new topic for his show. In desperation, he finally accepts some ideas from the gang. Gina suggests that he talk about how they first met and fell in love at a party. As they go around the room, each of them has a different remembrance of the events that day, with Gina imagining Martin as a shy nerd, Cole imagining Pam madly in love with him, Martin imagining himself as a super fly guy who wowed everyone on the sax, and Pam reimagining the party hijacked by gunmen and Martin holding Gina hostage. Tommy, the only one who has nothing to prove, tells the full story about how he, Cole, Shawn and Martin crashed the school with Young Pam and Gina in attendance. Gina gets to know Martin through this but his saxophone was stinky.
29	2	"Really, Gina Is Not My Lover"	Gerren Keith	Jacque Edmonds	August 29, 1993	9301	16.0
Martin is going to his high school reunion and he wants Gina to be ready for the big day. So he sends her on a day of beauty, but it ends disastrously. But Martin is determined to win the Man of the Decade award at his high school reunion that evening. His pride makes him want to appear to all his old schoolmates that he is rich and famous, and has a beautiful fashion model girlfriend. Guest appearances by Miguel A. Nunez, Jr. and Wendy Raquel Robinson.
30	3	"Got to Be There"	Gerren Keith	Diane Burroughs & Joey Gutierrez	September 5, 1993	9302	10.3
When Martin finds out that Gina has to go out of town on business, he, Tommy, Shawn & Cole decide they will go out and have some fun while she is away, Meanwhile, Gina & Pam are having some fun of their own at a company party in her hotel room, complete with a surprise male stripper.
31	4	"Beat It"	Gerren Keith	Bennie R. Richburg, Jr.	September 12, 1993	9304	14.7
Martin invites a crowd of friends over to watch boxing on TV, but can never get to watch it, because he is constantly interrupted by his guests.
32	5	"Baby, It's You"	Gerren Keith	Darice Rollins	September 19, 1993	9305	14.6
Martin agrees to help host a baby shower for some of Gina's expecting girlfriends at his apartment. But he doesn't expect one of the expectant mothers to go into labor.
33	6	"Workin' Day & Night"	Gerren Keith	Bentley Kyle Evans	September 26, 1993	9306	15.8
Martin decides to become more macho after Stan, as well as Tommy, Shawn and Cole, convince him that Gina has been controlling his life, and that he is 'whipped'. So to prove it, he decides to work double duty at the station just because Gina told him not to.
34	7	"Control"	Gerren Keith	Cheryl Holliday	October 3, 1993	9307	14.1
Gina accidentally throws away Martin's tickets to a very important professional basketball game. She later finds out that Sheneneh also has a pair of tickets to the same game, and begs Sheneneh for them. She compels Gina to work off the debt in her beauty salon. After she gets the tickets, she discovers they came from Martin.
35	8	"You've Got a Friend"	Gerren Keith	Diane Burroughs & Joey Gutierrez	October 10, 1993	9308	14.8
Gina starts to hang around with a new male friend. Martin gets suspicious and drives him away. But after getting rid of him, Martin realizes he made a mistake when Gina drags him along to shop for ladies' shoes.
36	9	"To Kill a Talking Bird"	Gerren Keith	John Ridley	October 17, 1993	9309	16.4
Mama Payne leaves her beloved talking parrot at Martin's apartment for the weekend. The talking bird constantly insults Gina, which infuriates her. Gina tries to keep her cool, and cares for the bird anyway. But the bird dies and Martin believes Gina killed the bird intentionally.
37	10	"Fat Like Dat"	Gerren Keith	Kenny Buford	October 24, 1993	9310	16.5
Gina convinces Martin that he's putting on weight. So he, Tommy and Cole go on a diet and attend Gina's aerobics class. Martin then decides that he will give up all the rich foods he used to enjoy, and in true Martin tradition, he takes his dieting and exercise to the extreme. Now Gina must figure out a way to bring the old Martin back.
38	11	"Hollywood Swinging"	Geren Keith	Sandy Frank & Matt Wickline	November 7, 1993	9311	15.4
39	12	"Hollywood Swinging"	Geren Keith	Bennie R. Richburg, Jr.	November 14, 1993	9312	14.9
Part 1: After Gina and Pam get promotions, Martin realizes his job is going nowhere. The breaking point for Martin comes when his ribbon-cutting at a new community center is eclipsed by Varnel Hill (Tommy Davidson) – a successful TV talk-show host who had been a former deejay at WZUP. After an on-air interview with Varnel, Martin decides to chase his dream of having a successful career by quitting his job, and heading to Hollywood. Part 2: In Los Angeles, Martin takes steps to ensure that he gets on Varnel Hill's talk show. Meanwhile, Pam chases after a limo believing Denzel Washington is inside. After a disastrous attempt to crash the stage on Varnel's talk show, Martin and his friends learn that Varnel is not who he makes himself out to be to the public, and Martin is back in Detroit groveling to Stan for his job back, having learned that there is no royal road to success, especially not if it comes at the cost of one's integrity.
40	13	"Thanks for Nothing"	Gerren Keith	Jacque Edmonds	November 21, 1993	9314	17.8
Martin wants to keep his relatives away from Thanksgiving dinner, and with good reason, as they are two boors who leer at Pam and Gina and insult Gina's straightlaced parents and Gina's overweight sister. The friction nearly leads to fighting, until Gina plays peacemaker.
41	14	"Whoop There It Ain't"	Gerren Keith	Cheryl Holliday	December 12, 1993	9313	14.0
After Pam catches Martin and Gina sneaking out of her party to have quickie sex, Pam challenges them to see if they can abstain from having sex for two weeks. Martin and Gina decide to make a bet to see who will be the first one to give in to their primal urges
42	15	"Holiday Blues"	Gerren Keith	Diane Burroughs & Joey Gutierrez	December 19, 1993	9315	15.4
It's Christmas time and Gina is homesick. Pam convinces Martin to take Gina home to Philadelphia. But instead of flying out of Detroit, Martin decides to take the bus. While waiting to leave, the city bus station gets snowed in.
43	16	"No Justice, No Peace"	Gerren Keith	Bentley Kyle Evans	January 9, 1994	9316	16.9
After receiving a traffic ticket, Martin innocently tries to dispute it in court.
44	17	"Suspicious Minds"	Gerren Keith	John Ridley	January 16, 1994	9317	16.5
After Martin's new CD Walkman goes missing, he suspects that one of his friends and Gina had stolen it.
45	18	"Love is in Your Face"	Gerren Keith	Jacque Edmonds	February 6, 1994	9319	15.5
46	19	"Love is in Your Face"	Gerren Keith	Diane Burroughs & Joey Gutierrez	February 13, 1994	9320	17.0
Part 1: Gina confronts Martin about their future when she is offered a job in another city. Part 2: With Gina moving on with her new job in New York, Martin is soul searching and makes a decision about their future.
47	20	"Arms Are for Hugging"	Gerren Keith	Cheryl Holliday	February 20, 1994	9321	15.5
Martin and Gina admit that they are fighting and arguing too much. So they seek the help of a church Minister for counseling to help them resolve their issues.
48	21	"Guard Your Grill"	Gerren Keith	Martin Lawrence	February 27, 1994	9318	15.9
After winning a charity boxing match, Martin thinks he is as good a fighter as anyone. Thomas Hearns, who was a celebrity judge at the fight, is friendly to Pam and Gina but Martin thinks Hearns is making a pass at Gina and trash talks him. After Hearns is not heard from after the party, Martin thinks Hearns has brushed it off and left town, only to get a surprise in the ring.
49	22	"Yours, Mine and Ours"	Gerren Keith	Sandy Frank & Matt Wickline	March 13, 1994	9322	16.4
When the small screen TV in the apartment needs to be replaced, Martin decides to use money from his and Gina’s combined checking account to buy a big-screen TV. This infuriates Gina, who makes him take it back, only to later be discovered buying items of her own in the same way.
50	23	"I Don't Have the Heart"	Gerren Keith	Diane Burroughs & Joey Gutierrez	March 27, 1994	9323	16.6
Pam starts dating an older, wealthy man (Steven Williams) who eventually asks her to marry him. Initially, the gang makes jokes about her old fuddy boyfriend. But soon they all start to enjoy the perks that go along with being in the entourage of a wealthy industrialist, as he is a minority owner in the Detroit Pistons. However, Pam has second thoughts when she learns he puts ex-wives out to pasture.
51	24	"Crunchy Drawers"	Gerren Keith	Bennie R. Richburg, Jr.	April 17, 1994	9325	14.7
Martin is dreaming that he is attracted to Pam.
52	25	"No Love Lost"	Gerren Keith	Bentley Kyle Evans	May 1, 1994	9324	15.3
Martin and Gina fight just before going to their engagement party, which Snoop Doggy Dogg has crashed.
53	26	"The Hoe Down in Motown"	Gerren Keith	John Ridley	May 8, 1994	9326	16.0
To avoid trouble with the IRS, Stan sells WZUP to a new owner who in turn changes the format to country. Martin tries to adapt to the new format. Special Note: Garrett Morris was absent in this episode due to being hospitalized as a result of a mugging. A videotape of him as Stan was filmed while Morris was actually on his hospital bed.
54	27	"Martin's on the Move"	Gerren Keith	Jacque Edmonds	May 15, 1994	9327	14.7
After being fired at WZUP and trying ways to make ends meet, a discouraged Martin disappears.: Jonathan Gries' last appearance; Garrett Morris' last appearance as a regular cast member

=== Season 3 (1994–1995) ===
No. overall	No. in season	Title	Directed by	Written by	Original release date	Prod. code	Viewers (millions)
55	1	"In Search of... Martin"	Gerren Keith	Phil Kellard & Tom Moore	September 1, 1994	9401	13.1
With Martin still missing, Gina and his friends locate him through a recent cashed check.
56	2	"Martin Returns"	Gerren Keith	Cheryl Holliday	September 8, 1994	9402	12.1
Martin returns home and finds his apartment redecorated by Gina who intends on moving in with him.
57	3	"I've Got Work to Do"	Gerren Keith	Bentley Kyle Evans	September 15, 1994	9403	12.1
Martin goes looking for a good job, but the only work available are a series of low-paying jobs. Martin believes that his former reputation as the WZUP DJ should have opened more doors for him & he refuses to fathom the thought of people seeing him working minimum wage jobs. With bills piling up, Gina is adamant Martin join the workforce, and he finally accepts the only job opening: buffing the floors at the Center of Employment.
58	4	"Martin Gets Paid"	Gerren Keith	Diane Burroughs & Joey Gutierrez	September 22, 1994	9404	12.4
Martin auditions for a television job, but finds out he must have an audition tape of himself doing a TV show. So he hurriedly gets the gang together and hires audience members to put on a quick show. But his antics during the taping wind up alienating him from everyone. In the end, he is offered an associate producer's job and must bring in donuts for the staff every morning.
59	5	"Break Up to Make Up"	Gerren Keith	Jacque Edmonds	September 29, 1994	9405	11.4
Martin feels his and Gina's relationship is becoming more strained. To remedy this he tries to spend more time with her. But she has a big presentation to do and needs to be alone to work.
60	6	"The Closer I Get to You"	Gerren Keith	Kenny Buford	October 6, 1994	9406	11.8
After the host of the show "Word on the Street", is arrested and dragged off the set right before airtime, Martin is pressed into service as a last-minute fill-in. And after his advice on the show brings an arguing couple back together, Martin begins referring to himself as the Love Doctor, and begins handing out relationship advice to everyone he meets.
61	7	"Movin' On In"	Gerren Keith	Diane Burroughs & Joey Gutierrez	October 20, 1994	9407	12.4
Martin and Gina finally decide to move in together. However, the apartment gets rather crowded when all of Gina's friends get there. The two clash on what to keep, and they end up with two of everything.
62	8	"Momma's Baby, Martin's Maybe"	Gerren Keith	Samm-Art Williams	November 3, 1994	9408	14.4
Martin is excited when Gina's mother (Judyann Elder), comes to visit them. This is his opportunity to impress Gina's mom and get to know her better. But things go awry when a young boy named Marvin (Marcus T. Paulk) shows up, claiming to be Martin's long lost son. After a DNA test though, Marvin apologizes to Martin for lying to him, admitting he just didn't want to go to Arizona.
63	9	"Whole Lotto Trouble"	Gerren Keith	Phil Kellard & Tom Moore	November 10, 1994	9409	13.3
Martin wins the Michigan Lottery. He celebrates by going out and buying tons of expensive luxury items and gives money away to his friends, BEFORE picking up his lottery money. But when he does, he finds out that the winning ticket is split - 300 ways!
64	10	"Get a Job"	Gerren Keith	Cheryl Holliday	November 17, 1994	9410	15.3
Nobody knows what Tommy does for a living, so Martin and Gina attempt to find out. So they decide to go undercover and stake him out, only to discover him on the runway at an uptown strip club! Could this be what Tommy does for a living?
65	11	"Feast or Famine"	Gerren Keith	Bentley Kyle Evans	November 24, 1994	9411	13.1
Thanksgiving dinner ends up a battle of the sexes when the gang holds a contest to see which gender cooks the best Thanksgiving feast. It only takes a short time for the guys to realize they are over matched, so they resort to some sneaky tactics to win the contest. Guest appearance by R&B/Soul singer Millie Jackson as Florine.
66	12	"Lockin' Boots"	Gerren Keith	Teri Schaffer	December 8, 1994	9412	13.0
Gina and Martin agree to save money. But then Gina is forced to secretly make a withdrawal from their bank account in order to pay a parking ticket. Martin finds out about the secret withdrawal, and gets even by going on a wild shopping spree.
67	13	"Go Tell It on the Martin"	Gerren Keith	Kenny Buford	December 15, 1994	9413	11.8
A deranged man who is distraught over losing his job and his woman, takes over the TV station during Martin's show, with a bomb strapped to his body. Guest appearances by Shirley Hemphill, BeBe Winans and CeCe Winans.
68	14	"'Xpress Yourself"	Gerren Keith	Darice Rollins	January 5, 1995	9414	13.0
Martin's TV show is doing well, and they are being prepped for nation-wide broadcast, but the show needs to be changed in order to appeal to a wider audience. Gina's company is hired by Martin's production company to advise new changes to for the show. But Gina’s new suggestions don’t sit well with Martin or his audience.
69	15	"Sophisticated Ladies"	Gerren Keith	Jacque Edmonds	January 19, 1995	9415	14.6
Gina and Pam put their best feet forward to be accepted into an exclusive women's club, but their plans of impressing the women are jeopardized when Sheneneh and Laquita show up and turn their dreams into a nightmare.
70	16	"Ain't Nuttin' Goin' on But the Rent"	Gerren Keith	Doreen Spicer	February 2, 1995	9416	14.9
Martin becomes angry when his landlord, Mr. Lopez (Luis Antonio Ramos), increases his rent. As a result, Martin refuses to pay the rent which leads Mr. Lopez to send him an eviction notice, and also cut off the heat during a terrible blizzard.
71	17	"The Ex-Files"	Gerren Keith	Jacque Edmonds	February 9, 1995	9417	15.6
After an argument about whether or not to invite their ex-lovers to the wedding, Martin and Gina decide to arrange a test to prove which one of them would be the most jealous of the other's ex. Guest appearances by Vivica A. Fox, Angelle Brooks and Joseph C. Phillips.
72	18	"All the Players Came"	Gerren Keith	Kenny Buford	February 16, 1995	9418	14.7
Martin organizes a fund-raiser to save a neighborhood theater. Guest appearances by Outkast (who perform Player's Ball during the credits), Coolio, Rudy Ray Moore, Antonio Fargas, Pam Grier, Ja'net Dubois, Whitman Mayo and Dick Anthony Williams.
73	19	"Best and Bester"	Gerren Keith	Cheryl Holliday	February 23, 1995	9419	13.4
Martin must choose either Tommy or Cole as his best man for his wedding. They both want to be the one chosen, so they bribe Martin with gifts to influence his decision. Meanwhile, Gina, Laquita and Pam search for a bridesmaid dress.
74	20	"High Noon"	Gerren Keith	Diane Burroughs & Joey Gutierrez	March 9, 1995	9420	14.2
The ex-convict (Gary Coleman) Martin helped imprisoned is suddenly out on parole and is looking to get even.
75	21	"Mother of the Bride"	Gerren Keith	Teri Schaffer	March 23, 1995	9421	12.8
Gina's mother hires a high class wedding planner who promises to arrange the day of Gina's dreams. But Martin wants to seek out a more economical (cheaper) alternative. So he hires his own personal consultant -- Hustle Man (Tracy Morgan).
76	22	"C.R.E.A.M."	Gerren Keith	Kenny Buford	April 6, 1995	9423	11.0
Martin and his old friend Stan (Garrett Morris) invest in a restaurant but they bite off more money than they can chew. Guest appearance by MC Hammer.
77	23	"Girlfriend"	Gerren Keith	Darice Rollins & Teri Schaffer	April 13, 1995	9424	9.4
Gina's conceited college friend, Monique (Merrin Dungey) comes to town. She's so offensive that Martin and Pam call a truce in their never ending fights and team up to expose her lurid past. Later, Martin invites Monique to appear on his TV talk show, and he exposes her to all of Detroit.
78	24	"The Romantic Weekend"	Gerren Keith	Matt Diamond & Guy Torry	April 27, 1995	9422	10.1
Gina is envious when Tommy and Pam plan to celebrate their six month anniversary of being together by going to a luxurious resort. When she complains to Martin about why they never do anything special, Martin takes Gina on a vacation to Chilligan's Island, a dreadful and low-rate resort that was advertised on the back of a cereal box. As the two try to make the best of their stay, they inadvertently run into Tommy and Pam who also are vacationing at the resort.
79	25	"The Bachelor Party"	Gerren Keith	Bentley Kyle Evans	May 4, 1995	9425	11.5
A nervous Martin and Gina try to enjoy their respective bachelor/bachelorette parties, but instead find themselves victims of their friends' bad advice and both imagine married life five years down the road.
80	26	"Wedding Bell Blues"	Gerren Keith	Phil Kellard & Tom Moore	May 11, 1995	9426	11.4
As Martin and Gina are making final preparations for their wedding, a visit from Martin's wacky relatives and Gina's conservative parents and overweight sister results in both families constantly bickering & fighting. At the last minute, Martin and Gina decide to elope.
81	27	"Love is a Beach"	Gerren Keith	Jacque Edmonds & Cheryl Holliday	May 18, 1995	9427	11.3
Martin and Gina flee to the Bahamas from their bickering families with Tommy and Pam to elope. Cole was expected to join them, but he got on the wrong flight. As they prepare, Martin gets stuck in an elevator with Tommy, while Pam accidentally ruins Gina's wedding gown. After the disasters have passed, Martin and Gina are free to take part in their long-awaited Oceanside wedding. Guest appearance by Kenny "Babyface" Edmonds.

=== Season 4 (1995–1996) ===
No. overall	No. in season	Title	Directed by	Written by	Original release date	Prod. code	Viewers (millions)
82	1	"Martin in the Corner Pocket"	Gerren Keith	Barry Vigon & Tom Walla	September 9, 1995	9501	7.8
A night with the boys goes wrong after Martin gets hustled by a female pool shark.
83	2	"Kill Him with Kindness"	Gerren Keith	Teri Schaffer	September 16, 1995	9502	7.5
After hearing about an insurance policy Martin believes Gina is plotting to kill him. Note: This is the final onscreen appearance of Mama Payne (Martin Lawrence). Her voice is later heard in the Season 5 episode "Scrooge".
84	3	"Blow, Baby, Blow"	Gerren Keith	Darice Rollins	September 23, 1995	9503	7.9
The Notorious B.I.G. has asked for Martin's help in finding a new background vocalist.
85	4	"Ring a Ding, Ding, Gone"	Gerren Keith	Bentley Kyle Evans	September 30, 1995	9504	8.1
Tommy and Cole explain to Martin that his wedding ring frightens off single women. After taking off his ring, and seeing all the attention he gets from beautiful women, he realizes they are right. But it's Martin who's running scared when he loses the ring and has to figure out how to tell Gina about it.
86	5	"Love T.K.O."	Gerren Keith	Jacque Edmonds	October 7, 1995	9505	8.0
Martin and Gina decide to have a quiet night at home to rekindle their love passion. But they are constantly being interrupted by their friends before the fun begins.
87	6	"He Say, She Say"	Gerren Keith	Michael Carrington	October 14, 1995	9506	7.8
After breaking up with Big Shirley, Martin convinces Cole to get back into the dating scene. At the club, Cole falls for a pretty woman who has just appeared on America's Most Wanted.
88	7	"Uptown Friday Night"	Gerren Keith	Kenny Buford	October 21, 1995	9507	7.4
Tommy, and Cole get robbed at Jerome's new club, the Shiznitz, after picking up Martin's anniversary gift for Gina - expensive earrings. So they get with Jerome to track down the 3 female thieves at their hideaway. Note: This is the final appearance of Jerome (played by Martin Lawrence).
89	8	"Old School Loving"	Gerren Keith	Samm-Art Williams	November 5, 1995	9508	13.3
Martin meets with Gina's boss over her long hours, then gets her fired. Now that Gina is unemployed, she spends her time rearranging the house, and painting the walls. So Martin tries to convince her boss to take her back.
90	9	"Cole on Ice"	Gerren Keith	Michael Ajakwe Jr.	November 19, 1995	9509	12.8
When Cole loses his job, Martin gets him a job working at the TV station. But Cole fouls it up. Guest appearance by Charles Barkley.
91	10	"Housekeeper from Hell"	Gerren Keith	Darice Rollins	November 26, 1995	9511	11.1
Martin and Gina decide to hire a maid. They both disapprove of the maids each other has chosen. They eventually settle on Miss Minnie (Marla Gibbs), a nice older motherly woman on the outside, but who makes their lives unliveable with her domineering ways.
92	11	"Three Homies and a Baby"	Gerren Keith	Teri Schaffer	December 3, 1995	9510	15.4
Martin agrees to baby-sit his infant cousin-in-law Cameron when his parents go out of town. But once they get snowed in, and can't return home & get their baby, Martin and Gina have to watch the baby. In the end, Gina has to leave for work, and Tommy and Cole come over to help out. However, even with the three of them, the baby still gets the upper hand. Guest appearances by Victoria Dillard and Mushond Lee. Note: This episode marks the final appearance of Reginald Ballard as Bruh-Man.
93	12	"Headin' for Trouble"	Gerren Keith	Michael Carrington	December 10, 1995	9512	12.7
Gina accidentally gets her head stuck in their new brass bed headboard while making love to Martin. They try everything to get her head unstuck; Tommy uses a welding torch to get most of it off. But Gina must still attend an important board meeting with the brass headboard, still stuck around her head, but hidden under a big wig and shawl.
94	13	"Swing Thing"	Gerren Keith	Teri Schaffer	December 17, 1995	9513	14.3
The Paynes’ are invited to attend a Christmas party, given by some influential people who may be able to help Martin in his career. But little does Martin realize that at the party, the guests are swapping more than Christmas gifts, and Martin may have both his hands full. Guest appearance by Lawrence Hilton-Jacobs.
95	14	"The Bodyguard"	Gerren Keith	Jacque Edmonds	January 7, 1996	9514	13.8
After Gina and Pam witness bank robbers leaving the scene of the crime, they must enter witness protection because the criminals are notorious for making their witnesses disappear. And since the police are afraid of the bank robbers, they arrange for Otis (played by Martin Lawrence) to be the girls' bodyguard.
96	15	"Green Card"	Gerren Keith	Michael Ajakwe Jr. & Michael Carrington	January 14, 1996	9515	13.4
The Hispanic building super is about to be deported, unless he gets married in a hurry. Pam, who desperately needs cash, so she can pay her back taxes to the IRS, agrees to be the bride -- for a price.
97	16	"You're All I Need"	Marian Deaton	Kenny Buford	February 4, 1996	9517	12.7
Martin flirts with a producer's wife (Kenya Moore) during a business dinner, leaving Gina starving for attention.
98	17	"Kicked to the Curb"	Gerren Keith	Samm-Art Williams	February 8, 1996	9516	11.7
Martin and Gina find a bigger and better apartment for half the price they're paying now. So they decide to sublet their old place to a young couple (Kristoff St. John, Tembi Locke) and move into the new place. But then the deal on the new place falls through, and it's too late to move back.
99	18	"The Best of Martin"	William H. Brown	Paul Wales	February 15, 1996	9527	10.6
Tisha Campbell hosts a special retrospective looking back at the best of the last 99 episodes of the series.
100	19	"The Love Jones Connection"	Gerren Keith	Bentley Kyle Evans	February 18, 1996	9518	11.7
Sheneneh crashes a Love Jones Connection show screening (a parody of Love Connection), then gets chosen. Guest appearances by Chris Rock and Donnie Simpson.
101	20	"Where the Party At"	Gerren Keith	Kenny Buford	February 25, 1996	9519	11.8
Gina attempts to arrange a surprise birthday party for Martin. But she runs into some unexpected difficulties when all his friends, including Tommy and Cole say they're not interested because of Martin's rude and obnoxious attitude. But they then turn the tables on both Martin and Gina by throwing a huge surprise birthday party at Nipsey's. (Cameo appearances by Halle Berry, Johnnie L. Cochran, Jr., Brian McKnight, Donnie Simpson, Chris Rock, Salt-n-Pepa, Robert Townsend, Will Smith, and Shaquille O'Neal).
102	21	"Homeo & Juliet"	Gerren Keith	Michael Ajakwe Jr.	February 29, 1996	9520	12.1
Gina, and Pam have taken roles in an upcoming play to help raise money for needy kids. But an accident on set causes the leading man to fall and injure himself, leaving them without a leading man. Martin then has to improvise with his own "homeboy" interpretation of "Romeo and Juliet". Guest appearance by Dorien Wilson.
103	22	"The Cabin Show"	Gerren Keith	Barry Vigon & Tom Walla	March 7, 1996	9521	11.0
The gang goes on a camping trip in the woods, and on a nature walk, Pam sprains her ankle, and Martin has to help her back to the cabin. The two get lost in the woods, just as darkness falls, and nobody knows how to find them.
104	23	"The Tooth Will Set You Free"	Gerren Keith	Darcel "The Fat Doctor" Blagmon	March 28, 1996	9522	10.9
A hypnosis for an aching tooth causes Pam to behave like Martin.
105	24	"Martin, I Want to Sing"	Gerren Keith	Jacque Edmonds	April 4, 1996	9523	10.7
After Pam's cousin, Alesha (played by Nichole Gilbert of the R&B group Brownstone) wins an open mike contest with her powerful singing voice, Martin only sees dollar signs, and decides to become her manager. But things go awry when she loses her voice at her audition because of practicing all night.
106	25	"D.M.V. Blues"	Gerren Keith	Charles Proctor	April 25, 1996	9524	10.6
Martin gets into a series of confrontations at the DMV while renewing his driver's license. Guest appearance by Sherman Hemsley.
107	26	"Why Can't We Be Friends"	Gerren Keith	Michael Ajakwe Jr. & Darice Rollins	May 2, 1996	9525	8.6
108	27	"Why Can't We Be Friends"	Gerren Keith	Michael Carrington & Teri Schaffer	May 2, 1996	9526	8.6
A feuding Martin and Tommy puts their friendship at a standstill until an accident puts Tommy in a hospital. Guest appearances by Kareem Abdul-Jabbar and Adele Givens.

=== Season 5 (1996–1997) ===
No. overall	No. in season	Title	Directed by	Written by	Original release date	Prod. code	Viewers (millions)
109	1	"Is You Is or Is You Ain't"	Gerren Keith	Michael Carrington	September 5, 1996	9601	10.4
Gina thinks she might be pregnant and is finding out if she is or not.
110	2	"Back in Trouble Again"	Gerren Keith	Barry Vigon & Tom Walla	September 12, 1996	9602	8.4
Martin attempts to hide his back injury from Gina while attending her awards dinner.
111	3	"Sophomore Jinx"	Gerren Keith	Michael Ajakwe Jr.	September 19, 1996	9603	8.6
After a constant quarrel, Martin thinks Gina wants a divorce.
112	4	"Working Girls"	Gerren Keith	Teri Schaffer	September 26, 1996	9604	9.3
Gina and Pam try to work together to get a famous designer to hire their company firm.
113	5	"Boo's in the House"	Gerren Keith	Barry Vigon & Tom Walla	October 31, 1996	9605	8.2
The prospect of owning a home gets scarier when Martin and Gina buy their "dream house" on Halloween, but soon find that the place is a haunted, calamity-filled horror. Guest appearance by Mr. T.
114	6	"Banging Hard in the School Yard"	Gerren Keith	Samm-Art Williams	November 7, 1996	9606	8.9
When Martin announces on his talk show that any man can beat any woman at anything, especially in sports, Gina, Laquita and Pam challenge him to a girls-against-guys basketball game. Martin and the guys think it will be easy to beat the girls, until they discover the girl's secret weapon: the Women's Olympic gold medal-winning basketball team (Teresa Edwards, Rebecca Lobo, Dawn Staley and Sheryl Swoopes).
115	7	"The Life You Save May Make You Rich"	Gerren Keith	Charles Proctor	November 14, 1996	9607	9.4
While attending a dinner party, Martin saves the life of an African prince (Ernest Lee Thomas). The prince rewards Martin with lavish gifts and offers him a large sum of money for Gina's services. Martin agrees until he realizes the prince wants Gina as one of his wives.
116	8	"Snow White"	Gerren Keith	Bentley Kyle Evans	November 21, 1996	9608	10.8
During a ski trip Martin and the gang believes Tommy is going to propose to a white woman. Guest appearance by Shaun Baker.
117	9	"Come on Over to My Place"	Gerren Keith	Kenny Buford	December 5, 1996	9609	8.6
Cole tries to impress a woman by getting his own apartment.
118	10	"Scrooge"	Gerren Keith	Teri Schaffer	December 19, 1996	9610	9.2
Four ghosts bring Martin the holiday spirit (four of them look like Tommy, Cole, Gina, and Pam). Guest appearance by Jackie Chan.
119	11	"Waiting, Debating and Ovulating"	Marian Deaton	Samm-Art Williams	January 9, 1997	9611	10.43
Martin tries to escape jury duty in order to conceive a child with Gina. Note: This episode marks the final appearance of Tisha Campbell as Gina Waters-Payne until the series finale. Campbell quit the series in episodes 120-130 due to claims that co-star Martin Lawrence sexually harassed her off the set of the sitcom. However, she does make a brief appearance in the episode "Stake-Out" (episode 128), in a scene with Pam and Lawrence as Elroy Preston.
120	12	"You Play Too Much"	Gerren Keith	Kenny Buford	January 23, 1997	9614	9.43
Martin helps out a burglar (Method Man) believing it is part of a prank set up by Pam. Guest appearance by Erik Estrada.
121	13	"Ain't That About a Ditch"	Gerren Keith	Darice Rollins	January 30, 1997	9615	10.44
Martin sneaks out to the club with his friends while Gina's mother is visiting him. Guest appearance by Tone Lōc.
122	14	"Goin' Overboard"	Gerren Keith	Michael Carrington	February 13, 1997	9612	9.14
123	15	"Goin' Overboard"	Gerren Keith	Michael Carrington	February 13, 1997	9613	9.14
Martin and the gang go on a cruise where everything is not going as planned. Note: Guest appearances by Lynn Whitfield (Whitfield and Lawrence previously co-starred together in the film A Thin Line Between Love and Hate), The Love Boat cast members Ted Lange, Lauren Tewes, Bernie Kopell and Jill Whelan.
124	16	"Power to the People's Court"	Gerren Keith	Michael Ajakwe Jr.	February 20, 1997	9617	8.44
Tommy decides to act as his own legal representative after Sheneneh sues him for hitting her car. Mark Curry guest stars as Ronnie Cochran, a spoof of Johnnie Cochran. Note: This is the only episode that Martin Payne (played by Martin Lawrence) does not appear in physically. However, his voice is heard on speakerphone and he eventually appears as Sheneneh Jenkins. In addition, this episode also marks the final appearance of Sheneneh.
125	17	"I, Martin, Take Thee Pam?"	Gerren Keith	Teri Schaffer	March 6, 1997	9616	8.94
Martin takes Pam back to Jamaica where he married Gina when he learns that his marriage to Gina is invalid and that he's actually married to Pam. David Alan Grier reprises his role Reverend Leon Lonnie Love.
126	18	"Auction"	Marian Deaton	Kenneth Whack	March 20, 1997	9618	8.57
Martin gives away a bothersome cuckoo clock, then frantically bids on it at a church auction after learning its supposed value.
127	19	"Daddy Dearest"	Gerren Keith	Darice Rollins	April 3, 1997	9619	7.47
Tommy gets a visit from his ex-marine father, (John Amos). Martin becomes a silent partner for Nipsey.
128	20	"Stake-Out"	Gerren Keith	Charles Proctor	April 10, 1997	9622	7.43
Detectives use Pam's apartment for a sting operation. Guest appearances by Keith Sweat Note: Tisha Campbell returns in this episode as Gina in a brief appearance, as well as appearing in a brief split screen scene with Lawrence during this episode.
129	21	"Goin' for Mine"	Gerren Keith	Kenny Buford	April 17, 1997	9621	8.37
Pam gets laid off from her regular job and tries to land one with a record company. Guest appearances by Dondre Whitfield, Jenna von Oÿ, Anthony Johnson and Phil Morris. Note: This episode was a backdoor pilot for a spin-off of the same name starring Tichina Arnold, but the pilot was not picked to series. In this episode, Martin only appears in the teaser.
130	22	"One Flew Over the Hoochie's Nest"	Gerren Keith	Michael Ajakwe Jr.	April 24, 1997	9620	8.21
Pam mistakenly gets taken to a psychiatric ward after her eccentric identical cousin Tammy (portrayed by Tichina Arnold in a dual role) escaped from that facility.
131	23	"California, Here We Come"	Gerren Keith	Story by : Barry Vigon & Tom Walla; Teleplay by : Michael Carrington	May 1, 1997	9623	8.56
132	24	"California, Here We Come"	Gerren Keith	Story by : Barry Vigon & Tom Walla; Teleplay by : Michael Carrington	May 1, 1997	9624	8.56
A huge national deal for Martin's talk show and Gina's promotion from her company prepares them to move to Los Angeles. Cole attempts proposing to Shanise. Guest appearances by George Clinton, Lisa Leslie, Thomas Hearns and Lou Rawls. Note: Tisha Campbell returned to the series following a ten-episode hiatus, after settling a sexual harassment lawsuit against Martin Lawrence. As a condition of her agreement to return, Martin and Tisha's scenes were filmed at different times to prevent them from meeting each other; this results in the both of them not appearing in the same scenes together.
