= Eddie's Million Dollar Cook-Off =

2003 television film by Paul Hoen

- Promotional advertisement
- Genre: Comedy
- Teleplay by: Dan Berendsen
- Story by: Jack Jason; Rick Bitzelberger; Dan Berendsen
- Directed by: Paul Hoen
- Starring: Taylor Ball; Orlando Brown; Reiley McClendon; Rose McIver; Mark L. Taylor
- Music by: David Kitay
- Country of origin: United States
- Original language: English

Production
- Executive producers: Marlee Matlin; Jack Jason
- Producer: Richard D. Arredondo
- Production location: West Auckland, New Zealand
- Cinematography: Donald Duncan
- Editor: Terry Stokes
- Running time: 85 minutes
- Production company: Solo One Productions

Original release
- Network: Disney Channel
- Release: July 18, 2003

Eddie's Million Dollar Cook-Off is a 2003 American comedy television film directed by Paul Hoen, written by Dan Berendsen, and starring Taylor Ball, Orlando Brown, Reiley McClendon, Rose McIver, and Mark L. Taylor. It aired on Disney Channel as one of its Original Movies on July 18, 2003.

== Plot ==
Eddie Ogden is an eighth grader at Cedar Valley Junior High School, and plays baseball for the Groundhogs, which is coached by his father. At the same time, Eddie likes making food, especially his very own "Eddie Dogs", which he preps after every game for him and his friends.

Holding high expectations for him, Eddie's father wants him to win a scholarship for his baseball skills. Though Eddie likes baseball, he discovers an attraction to cooking after watching Bobby Flay on The Food Network.

When the time comes for him and his friends D.B. and Frankie to sign up for electives, Eddie suggests that they all sign up for computer science, since he believes it is an easy elective. Eddie starts to question his choice, however, after he sees the home economics classroom, so he tricks his friends into signing it so they all end up in home economics together.

Eddie and his friends goof around and get into trouble frequently in class, but Eddie learns of a million dollar cook-off that can get him into a culinary institute. He signs up secretly, afraid of what his friends and family will think. Surprisingly, his mother learns of Eddie's interest in culinary arts and encourages him to go on. When Eddie's teacher announces to the class who is in the finals, everyone is shocked that Eddie actually entered and won. As a result, he is teased and humiliated relentlessly by his friends and the kids at school, as well as his brothers.

Eddie starts spending more time on cooking and less on baseball. When his father learns of the cook-off, he is extremely disappointed. Eddie repeatedly switches between cooking and baseball as he struggles to decide between pleasing his father and pursuing his dream. In the process, he is laughed at and humiliated by nearly everyone, loses all of his friends (except for Hannah who understands what it's like not to be able to live up to a parent's expectations) and displeases his father.

As it turns out, the day of the baseball finals and the day of the cook-off are the same, leaving Eddie to make the choice to please his father or follow his dreams. Eddie stops by the building where the competition is being held, only to find that his idol, Bobby Flay, is hosting.

Ultimately, Eddie goes to the game for the sake of his father and friends, but cannot concentrate. Seeing the state he is in, his friends finally accept that he loves cooking and tell him to go to the cook-off and let them win on their own for once. With his friends now behind him, Eddie and his mother go to the cook-off, leaving his father stunned by his decision. He arrives an hour late and has no one to help him but he is determined to try his best. His friends watch the cook-off on a portable television in the dugout and see that Eddie is struggling as he has less time and no one to help. After hearing this, and seeing Hannah's mom finally supporting her, his father purposely gets himself kicked out of the game to go and help Eddie. Eddie is surprised by this, but his father proves to be a huge help during the cook off.

Together, the two manage to complete the cook-off just in time. Eddie loses to Bridget Simons, but when confronted by Frankie, Bobby Flay says that he believes Eddie should have won. Eddie's father comforts him, telling him no matter what he does, he will support him from now on. Eddie's brothers even show up to finally support him after seeing the cook-off on TV. Eddie's team wins without him as D.B. finally gets a hit.

Eddie and his friends go to celebrate at his house. Bridget comes too, and shares her trophy with Eddie.

== Cast ==
- Taylor Ball as Eddie Ogden
- Orlando Brown as Frankie
- Reiley McClendon as D.B.
- Mark L. Taylor as Hank Ogden
- Rose McIver as Hannah
- Kylie Leydon as Bridget Simons
- Bobby Flay as Himself
- Susan Brady as Sarah Ogden
- Nicholas Miller as Alex Odgen
- Johnny Barker as Andy Ogden
- Faine Alexander as Penny
- Renee Ji as Kim
- Daniel Costello as Oliver
- Nancy Lenehan (uncredited) as Mrs. Hadley

== Production ==
The film was shot in New Zealand, at Studio West in West Auckland.
