= Taylor Ball =

American former actor

Taylor Benjamin Ball
- Born: December 28, 1987 (age 38); San Antonio, Texas, U.S.
- Occupations: Musician, Actor
- Years active: 1999–present

Taylor Ball (born December 28, 1987) is an American musician and former actor known for his portrayal of Brian Miller in the television sitcom Still Standing and Eddie in Disney's Eddie's Million Dollar Cook-Off. Ball has also appeared on Walker, Texas Ranger. Since 2017, he has been in the band “Tragic Forms”.

== Filmography ==
Year	Title	Role	Notes
1999	Walker, Texas Ranger	Bison Scout #1	Episode: "Tall Cotton"
2002	Special	Dennis	Short film
2002–2006	Still Standing	Brian Miller	87 episodes
2003	Eddie's Million Dollar Cook-Off	Eddie Ogden	TV movie
2005	Unscripted	Young Director	Episode: "1.5"; Episode: "1.8"
2015	Aliment	The Dead Body	short film
