= The Dukes (film) =

- Theatrical release poster
- Directed by: Robert Davi
- Written by: Robert Davi; James Andronica
- Produced by: Jim Cypherd; Robert Davi; Don Dunn
- Starring: Chazz Palminteri; Robert Davi; Peter Bogdanovich; Frank D'Amico; Elya Baskin
- Cinematography: Michael Goi
- Edited by: Jim Cypherd
- Music by: Nic. tenBroek
- Release date: April 23, 2007
- Country: United States
- Language: English

The Dukes is a 2007 comedy-drama film about a group of has-been musicians who attempt a bank heist. The film was directed by Robert Davi, and stars Chazz Palminteri, Robert Davi, Peter Bogdanovich, Frank D'Amico and Elya Baskin.

== Cast ==
- Chazz Palminteri as George
- Robert Davi as Danny
- Peter Bogdanovich as Lou
- Frank D'Amico as Armond
- Elya Baskin as Murph
- Miriam Margolyes as Aunt Vee
- Melora Hardin as Diane
- Bruce Weltz as Toulio
- Eloise DeJoria as Katherine
- Joseph Campanella as Giovanni Zorro
- Dominic Scott Kay as Brion
- Elaine Hendrix as Stephanie
- Alphonse Mouzon as Ray
- Joyce Westergarrd as Suzette
- John Prosky as Brad

== Reception ==
On review aggregator Rotten Tomatoes, the film holds a 57%, based on 23 reviews, with an average rating of 5.9/10.
