= The Flyboys (film) =

- Theatrical release poster
- Directed by: Rocco DeVilliers
- Written by: Rocco DeVilliers; Jason DeVilliers
- Produced by: Rocco DeVilliers; Dan Urness
- Starring: Reiley McClendon; Jesse James; Stephen Baldwin; Tom Sizemore
- Cinematography: Jim Orr
- Edited by: Rocco DeVilliers
- Music by: Lisle Moore
- Production company: Dark Coast Pictures
- Distributed by: Warner Bros. Pictures; Dark Coast Pictures
- Release date: August 15, 2008 (United States)
- Running time: 123 minutes
- Country: United States
- Language: English
- Budget: $2.4 million

The Flyboys (released Internationally as Sky Kids) is a 2008 American aviation adventure film starring Reiley McClendon, Jesse James, Stephen Baldwin and Tom Sizemore. The Flyboys revolve around a "coming-of-age" story of two boys from a small town who find their courage tested when they accidentally stow away aboard an aircraft owned by the mob. This was the final film for actor Harrison Young, who died three years before the film was released.

== Plot ==
In a small Arizona town, the new kid, Kyle, finds himself saving one of his classmates, Jason, from a group of bullies and they quickly become friends. Jason takes Kyle to the local airport where his uncle Ed works, and they all go on a flight. Thrilled about the adventure, they plan to meet again the next morning at the airport. On their own they check out some planes, first sitting inside a small light aircraft before Jason leads them to a mysterious hangar with a larger plane. While trying out the controls of the silver colored twin-engine airliner, the hangar doors unexpectedly open and the boys immediately hide to avoid getting in trouble. They hope that whoever it is will simply leave shortly so they hide in the rear baggage compartment but to their dismay the plane gets started and heads for takeoff. Jason sneaks a peak to see who is on board and is startled to see that one of the men has a gun. At a stopover at an unknown airport, a small bag gets placed into the boys' compartment. The plane takes off again and after a while the boys discover the bag contains a bomb. They burst into the cabin to report their discovery but are shocked to see that the plane is empty. Kyle throws the bomb out of the door while Jason gets in the cockpit to maneuver the plane away from a mountainside. Together they then manage to safely land the aircraft. The two are regarded in the news as heroes, but their troubles have now caught up to them. Jason and Kyle soon realize that they are embroiled in a criminal effort to steal millions of dollars from the mob. In the process of staying one step ahead of gangsters, they find their courage to come out on top. They are taken to a mansion where they had a gunfight with the owner Angelo Esposito. There they also meet Angelo's brother Silvio and his partner Lenny Drake, who are secretly the two men that were in the plane. After Angelo thanks the boys for saving his plane, he orders Silvio and Lenny to take them home.

On the way, Jason speaks through Kyle's walkie talkie which caused Lenny to hear it from the walkie talkie he took from the plane which was Jason's and attempted to shoot them with his gun. However, he is stopped by Silvio and is forced to step out of the car. Silvio berates Lenny for his lack of intelligence and that he betrayed Angelo just for the money. Lenny shoots Silvio and starts a chase with the boys which ends with Kyle getting captured by Lenny.

Lenny orders Jason to meet him at the hangar in 15 minutes, otherwise, he would kill Kyle. When Kyle and Lenny reach the hangar, they meet Ed, and Lenny orders him to get in the plane, which Ed complies to. Jason made it to the hangar and got in the plane in the nick of time before it took off. Meanwhile, Silvio tells Angelo that Lenny shot him and thanks him for looking after him before succumbing to his injuries.

Lenny orders Ed to fly high enough for him to escape with the money. When Kyle tells Lenny that Angelo would punish him, Lenny attempts to throw Kyle out of the plane. Ed turns the plane to prevent Lenny from doing that. Lenny tries to shoot Ed, but Kyle stops him. This gives Ed enough time to beat up Lenny, while Jason takes control of the plane. When Kyle threw the gun to Ed, he and Lenny fight over it. During the fight, Kyle throws the money out of the plane, much to Lenny's frustration; Kyle suddenly slipped out of the plane. Ed beats up Lenny and tells Jason to get the parachute, and they both jump out of the plane.

Ed puts on the parachute and Jason holds on to him. Ed manages to save Kyle from falling and they land safely. Angelo then comes in a helicopter and asks if Kyle and Jason are all right, while Lenny, still on the plane, crashes into a mountain and the explosion kills him. Angelo then asks Kyle and Jason where Silvio is. When they reach Silvio, they found out he already died from his injuries. Jason returns home and his grandpa gives him one of his medals for his bravery.

Meanwhile, one of the bullies was busy fixing his car, until two of Angelo's guards named Manny and Sal, picked him up and threatened him. Angelo gives Kyle and Jason a new plane as their wish, and they, along with Ed and Kyle's mom, Samantha, fly off into the sunset.

== Cast ==
- Reiley McClendon as Kyle Barrett
- Jesse James as Jason McIntyre
- Stephen Baldwin as Silvio Esposito
- Tom Sizemore as Angelo Esposito
- J. Todd Adams as Lenny Drake
- Dallen Gettling as Ed Thomas
- Jennifer Slimko as Samantha Barrett
- Robert Costanzo as Carmine
- Vince Cecere as Manny
- Frank D'Amico as Sal
- Harrison Young as Grandpa Thomas
- Blaire Baron as Susan Thomas
- Tommy Hinkley as John McIntyre
- Joanne Baron as Ms. Poulson
- Dylan Kasch as Rick
- Jesse Plemons as Bully #1
- Travis Whitney as Bully #2

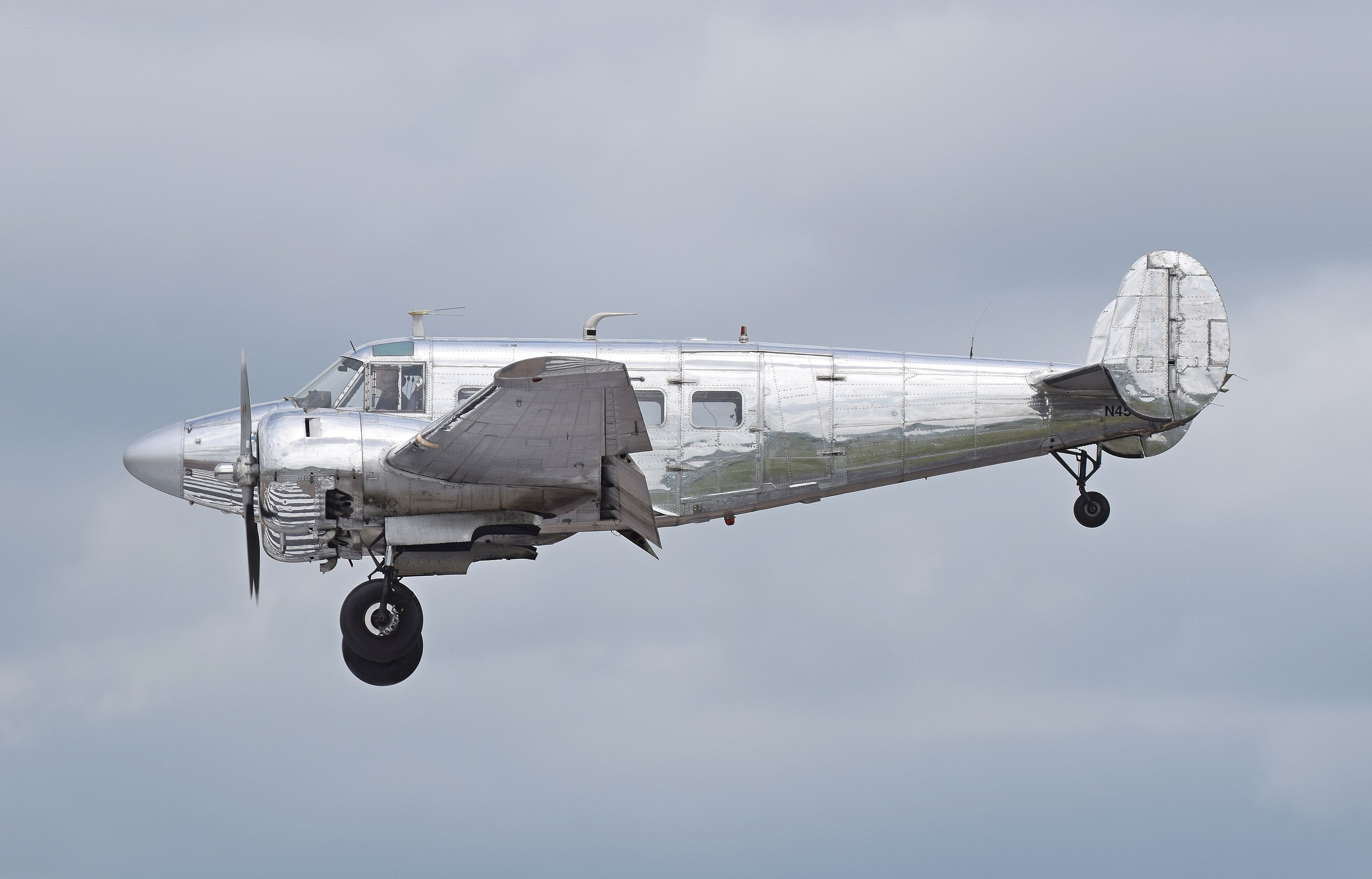
A Beech 18S like the one that appeared in The Flyboys.

== Production ==
Producer, director and screenwriter Rocco DeVilliers worked with a $2.4 million budget, meagre for a major production. Including pre-production, work on the film took over seven years. Once production was complete, the film was shopped around to major studios and distributors but was not successful in making any headway. Ultimately, despite 21 wins at numerous film festivals, The Flyboys was relegated to a DVD release, re-titled as Sky Kids. Promotional efforts then centered on the new title. The film was broadcast on Sky Movies UK on August 15, 2009. It was released on DVD in the UK titled Sky Kids on May 25, 2009.

The Flyboys was filmed in parts of Southwestern Utah, mainly in Hurricane, Utah, St. George, Utah, Washington, Utah and Zion National Park. Principal photography took place at Mesquite Airport, in Clark County, Nevada, United States. The aircraft used in the film included: a Bullock Bu-180 (N145BB), Beech 18S (CZ -265, N476PA), Beech A36 Bonanza, Eurocopter AS350 Écureuil (N410JC), and Piper PA-34-220T Seneca III (N83878). (Note: The Beech Model 18 featured in the film was owned and flown by pilot Skip Evans.)

== Reception ==
In 2008, Devilliers embarked on an odyssey of film festivals all over the United States, with The Flyboys picking up 21 individual awards. A total of 14 awards were for best feature film while Steven Baldwin was also nominated for best supporting actor.

== Cancelled TV Series ==
In 2012, Dark Coast Pictures began developing a television series continuation, with Rocco DeVilliers shooting a 15-minute test-footage promo primarily in Lincoln County to pitch to networks. The series first season was planned to have 13 episodes, focusing on the main duo trying to get through high-school while also continuing their troublesome ways. Reiley McClendon and Jesse James were set to reprise their roles from the 2008 film as well as other cast and characters. It was reported that deleted and unreleased scenes and storylines shot for the 2008 film would be intertwined and featured in the series as an additional plotline to their backstory.

As of 2025, the planned series has never materialized.

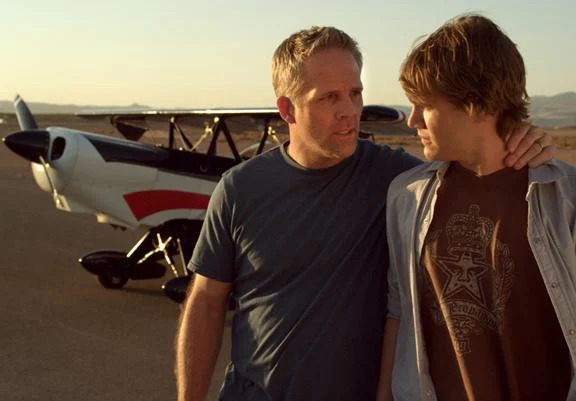
Reiley McClendon and Ed Thomas during a test-footage scene for the cancelled series.

== See also ==
- List of American films of 2008
