= Reiley McClendon =

American actor (born 1990)

- Born: Eric Reiley McClendon II; March 11, 1990 (age 36); Baton Rouge, Louisiana, U.S.
- Occupation: Actor
- Years active: 1998–present

Reiley McClendon (born Eric Reiley McClendon II; March 11, 1990) is an American actor.

He has appeared on such television shows as Will & Grace, Zoey 101, and Medium, as well as in Disney Channel films such as Eddie's Million Dollar Cook-Off and Buffalo Dreams.

He played the young Danny Walker in the 2001 film Pearl Harbor with Jesse James, who played Rafe McCawley. He appeared in the Law & Order: Special Victims Unit episode "Identity" in a dual role as identical twins Logan and Lindsay Stanton. He had a role in Shangri-La Suite (2016) opposite Luke Grimes and Emily Browning.

== Filmography ==
Year	Film	Role	Notes
1998	Profiler	Mark Weller	
1998	Will & Grace	Nixon	
1999	Touched by an Angel	Duncan Danzig at 10	
1999	The Love Boat: The Next Wave	Little Boy	
2000	The Norm Show	Jack	
2000	Disney's The Kid	Mark	
2000	Another Woman's Husband	Kid in Pool	
2000	Danny and Max	Danny	
2001	Pearl Harbor	Young Danny Walker	
2002	Gentle Ben	Mark Wedloe	
2002	ER	Aaron James	
2003	Eddie's Million Dollar Cook-Off	D.B.	
2003	Gentle Ben 2: Danger on the Mountain	Mark Wedloe	
2003	Law & Order: Criminal Intent	Jason Conners	Episode: Happy Family
2003	Everwood	Travis	
2005	Law & Order: Special Victims Unit	Logan and Lindsay/Lucas Stanton	
2005	The Nickel Children	Nolan	
2005	Buffalo Dreams	Josh Townsend	
2005	Zoey 101	Keith Finch's friend	Episode: "Defending Dustin"
2005-06	Just Legal	Tom Ross	5 episodes
2006	CSI: Miami	Austin Wells	
2006	Medium	Todd Gromada	
2006	The Elder Son	Nikita Sarafanov	
2007	CSI: Crime Scene Investigation	Charlie Kellerman	
2008	The Flyboys	Kyle Barrett	
2009	Safe Harbor	Luke	
2009	The Cleaner	Tyler Fisher	Episode: "Path of Least Resistance"
2009	Accused at 17	Chad Voyt	
2010	Dirty Girl	Mike	
2011	Rizzoli & Isles	Gaven	
2012	The Mine or Abandoned Mine	Brad	
2013	Suits	Liam Colson	
2013	NCIS	Private Brad Sykes	Episode: "Hereafter"
2013	Monday Mornings	Jacob Gold	
2013	Ironside	Jake Patterson	
2014	The Fosters	Vico Cerar	8 episodes
2014	Alien Outpost	Andros	
2015	Evelyn's Wake	Adam	
2016	The Perfect Daughter	Sam Cahill	
2016	Days of Our Lives	Dirk	4 episodes
2016	Major Crimes	Benny	Episode: "Moral Hazard"
2017	Time Trap	Taylor	
2019	Christmas in July	Daniel	Feature film
2019	Holey Moley	Himself/Contestant	Season 1, Episode 4
