= The Elder Son (2006 film) =

2006 American comedy drama film

- Directed by: Maryus Vaysberg
- Written by: Marius Balchunas; Scott Sturgeon
- Based on: The Elder Son by Alexander Vampilov
- Produced by: Eric Koskin; Damon Martin
- Starring: Shane West; Leelee Sobieski; Rade Šerbedžija; Eric Balfour; Regina Hall; Reiley McClendon
- Cinematography: Andrew Huebscher
- Edited by: David Dodson
- Music by: Yagmur Kaplan; Mladen Milićević
- Distributed by: 2 Loop Films
- Release date: October 31, 2006
- Running time: 87 minutes
- Country: United States
- Language: English

The Elder Son is a 2006 American comedy drama film written and directed by Maryus Vaysberg and Scott Sturgeon. It is based upon the play of the same name by Alexander Vampilov.

== Plot ==
Maxim Sarafanov (Rade Šerbedžija) has just been fired from the orchestra he played clarinet in, his son Nikita (Reiley McClendon) is in love with his schoolteacher Susan (Regina Hall), and his daughter Lolita (Leelee Sobieski) is to marry pilot Greg (Brian Geraghty) and move to Texas. But things get worse when a small-time car thief Bo (Shane West) looking for a hideout from the police tells Maxim that he is his son from Maxim's old girlfriend towards whom he still has feelings.

== Cast ==
- Shane West as Bo
- Leelee Sobieski as Lolita Sarafanov
- Rade Šerbedžija as Maxim Sarafanov
- Eric Balfour as Skip
- Regina Hall as Susan
- Reiley McClendon as Nikita Sarafanov
- Brian Geraghty as Greg
