= Still Standing (American TV series) =

American television sitcom (2002–2006)

- Genre: Sitcom
- Created by: Diane Burroughs & Joey Gutierrez
- Starring: Mark Addy; Jami Gertz; Jennifer Irwin; Taylor Ball; Renee Olstead; Soleil Borda; Joel Murray
- Theme music composer: Holly Knight
- Opening theme: "You Make Me Happy", performed by Will Hoge
- Composer: Dennis C. Brown
- Country of origin: United States
- Original language: English
- No. of seasons: 4
- No. of episodes: 88 (list of episodes)

Production
- Executive producers: Diane Burroughs; Joey Gutierrez; Tim Doyle
- Producers: Jay Kleckner; Ben Wexler; Randy Cordray
- Camera setup: Multi-camera
- Running time: 21 minutes
- Production companies: Tea Gal and Java Boy Productions; CBS Productions; 20th Century Fox Television

Original release
- Network: CBS
- Release: September 30, 2002 – March 8, 2006

The cast of Still Standing

Still Standing is an American television sitcom created by Diane Burroughs and Joey Gutierrez, that aired on CBS from September 30, 2002, to March 8, 2006. It stars Mark Addy and Jami Gertz as Bill and Judy Miller, a working-class couple living in Chicago, Illinois. Taylor Ball, Renee Olstead, and Soleil Borda portray their children and Jennifer Irwin portrays Judy's sister Linda.

== Plot ==
A working-class couple in Chicago tries to instill good values in their three kids, Brian (Taylor Ball), Lauren (Renee Olstead), and Tina (Soleil Borda), but their own past experiences often conflict with the lessons they teach their children. Judy Miller (Jami Gertz) is the attractive wife, who was wooed by Bill (Mark Addy). Judy's sister Linda (Jennifer Irwin) continuously butts heads with Bill.

== Cast and characters ==
=== Main ===
- William "Bill" Miller (Mark Addy): The patriarch of the Miller family. He was a former high school football standout, but is now often perceived as overweight and lazy.
- Judith "Judy" Miller (née Michaels) (Jami Gertz): The matriarch of the Miller family.
- Brian Hops Miller (Taylor Ball): Eldest and only son of the Miller family. Brian is a gifted but relatively unpopular high-school student; widely regarded as a geek.
- Lauren Barley Miller (Renee Olstead): The older daughter of the Miller family. Lauren is one of the beautiful, popular girls at school.
- Tina Kathleen Miller (Soleil Borda): The youngest child of the Miller family. She is very eccentric and does not fit the mold of a "typical" little girl.
- Linda Michaels (Jennifer Irwin): Judy's younger sister. Linda spends much of her time hanging around the Miller house, much to Bill's dismay. In early episodes she is single and portrayed as a "crazy cat lady" until her cat Nathaniel Pawthorne dies in season 3 and she meets her later husband, Perry.
- Daniel "Fitz" Fitzsimmons (Joel Murray): Bill's best friend, who works with Bill as a salesman.

=== Guest and recurring ===
- Perry (James Patrick Stuart): Linda's husband, a musician who performs in Reno. Perry speaks with a British accent even though he's from Florida. Upon meeting Bill and Judy, Perry explained that he worked for a summer at Epcot and the accent just sort of "stuck."
- Marion Fitzsimmons (Kerri Kenney-Silver): Fitz's wife. She is considered controlling by Fitz and is very much portrayed as not being on the same page, humor-wise, with Fitz, Bill and Judy – one of the factors behind her and Judy not always getting along.
- Gene Michaels (Steven Gilborn): Judy and Linda's father. He is an avid collector of model trains.
- Helen Michaels (Janet Carroll, seasons 1 and 2; Swoosie Kurtz, seasons 3 and 4): Judy and Linda's mother.
- Hakim (Daniel Murillo): Hakim is Brian's good friend, who also attends Jefferson High School
- Al Miller (Paul Sorvino): Bill's father, a retired steelworker. When Bill was younger, Al left Bill and his mother, Louise, with little or no money, creating the main dynamic between Bill and Al.
- Louise Miller (Sally Struthers): Bill's manipulative mother, who moved to Chicago after her divorce. She manipulates those around her by guilt-tripping them, and her controlling nature with Bill sets her constantly at odds with Judy.
- Johnny (Clyde Kusatsu): Louise Miller's new love interest and eventual husband. He is Japanese.
- Bonnie (Ashley Tisdale): Brian's girlfriend.
- Becca (Lauren Schaffel): Lauren's best friend.
- Ted Halverson (Kevin Nealon): The Millers' religious neighbor.
- Kathy Halverson (Marin Mazzie): Ted Halverson's equally religious wife. Kathy is usually the voice of reason and dampens Ted's competitive nature.
- Matt Halverson (Shawn Pyfrom): Ted's son and one of Lauren's boyfriends.
- Shelly (Julia Campbell) and Terry (Justine Bateman): The Millers' lesbian neighbors, and mothers of Chris.
- Chris (Sean Marquette/Jared Hillman): Lauren's love interest in several episodes; Shelly and Terry's son.
- Kyle Polsky (Todd Stashwick): Bill's neighbor, who has a large collection of toys.
- Carl (David Koechner): Bill's best friend during seasons 1 and 2. Works with Bill at the department store.
- Maxwell "Mack" McDaniel (John Marshall Jones): Bill and Fitz's friend during seasons 2 and 3 (6 episodes). Mack works with Bill and Fitz at the department store.
- Jeff Hackman (Chris Elliott): Also works with Bill. Sometimes called Jeff Hackman "Never-Pay-Ya-Backman".

== Episodes ==
| Season | Episodes | Originally released | |
| Season | Episodes | First released | Last released |
|---|---|---|---|
| 1 | 22 | September 30, 2002 | May 12, 2003 |
| 2 | 23 | September 22, 2003 | May 24, 2004 |
| 3 | 23 | September 20, 2004 | May 23, 2005 |
| 4 | 20 | September 21, 2005 | March 8, 2006 |

Each of the episode titles begins with the word "Still", with the exception of the pilot.

== Syndication ==
From 2006 until 2009, Still Standing aired in broadcast syndication across the United States. Reruns of Still Standing aired on Lifetime beginning in 2006 and lasted until 2009, and ABC Family from 2010 until 2014.

== Reception ==
=== Critical reception ===
A 2002 Entertainment Weekly review gave Still Standing a "D" grade. Michael Speier of Variety gave the series a negative review, commenting "yet another sitcom about dumb men and the women who love them, CBS' "Still Standing" gains little mileage out of a collection of punchlines that have turned up on every other half-hour since the dawn of time." In a more favorable review from new website SFGate, Tim Goodman said ""Still Standing" is a funny show. It's funny the way "King of Queens" is funny. It's "Becker" funny. Meaning, if you fit into a certain demographic and like your comedy a certain way—bingo—it's a smash hit for you." On the review aggregator website Rotten Tomatoes, 44% of 9 critics' reviews are positive, with an average rating of 3.1/10.

=== Nielsen ratings ===
| Season | Timeslot (EDT) | Season Premiere | Season Finale | TV Season | Rank | Viewers (in millions) |
|---|---|---|---|---|---|---|
| 1 | Monday 9:30 P.M. | September 30, 2002 | May 12, 2003 | 2002–2003 | #17 | 14.41 |
| 2 | Monday 9:30 P.M. | September 22, 2003 | May 24, 2004 | 2003–2004 | #26 | 11.82 |
| 3 | Monday 9:30 P.M. | September 20, 2004 | May 23, 2005 | 2004–2005 | #48 | 9.95 |
| 4 | Wednesday 8:00 P.M. | September 21, 2005 | March 8, 2006 | 2005–2006 | #87 | 7.0 |

=== Awards and nominations ===
| Year | Award | Category | Recipient | Result | Ref. |
|---|---|---|---|---|---|
| 2003 | ASCAP Film and Television Music Awards | Top TV Series | Holly Knight | Won | |
| 2004 | ASCAP Film and Television Music Awards | Top TV Series | Holly Knight | Won | |
| 2003 | Young Artist Award | Best Performance in a TV Series (Comedy or Drama) - Leading Young Actress | Renee Olstead | Nominated | |
| 2004 | Young Artist Award | Most Popular Mom & Dad in a Television Series | Mark Addy, Jami Gertz | Nominated | |
| 2005 | Young Artist Award | Best Family Television Series (Comedy) | Still Standing | Nominated | |
| 2006 | Young Artist Award | Best Performance in a TV Series (Comedy or Drama) - Leading Young Actress | Renee Olstead | Won | |
