= Abandoned Mine =

- Directed by: Jeff Chamberlain
- Screenplay by: Jeff Chamberlain
- Story by: Scott Woldman
- Produced by: Scott Woldman; Jeff Chamberlain; Mark Victor; Steve Zacharias
- Starring: Alexa Vega; Reiley McClendon; Saige Thompson; Charan Prabhakar; Adam Hendershott
- Edited by: Michael R. Fox; Steve Haugen
- Music by: Russ Howard III
- Production company: Mountainbridge Films
- Distributed by: Gravitas Ventures; Millennium Entertainment; Relay Releasing Co.
- Release dates: September 13, 2012 (Sandy, Utah premiere); August 15, 2013
- Running time: 95 minutes

Abandoned Mine, also known as The Mine, is a 2012 horror film written and directed by Jeff Chamberlain. The film premiered in Sandy, Utah in September 2012 and had a limited release on August 15, 2013.

== Plot ==
Five friends explore a supposedly haunted mine to celebrate Halloween, exactly one hundred years after a family was murdered in the mine. They soon find to their horror that the ghostly rumors may be true as they fight for survival.

== Cast ==
- Alexa Vega as Sharon, Brad's new girlfriend
- Reiley McClendon as Brad, the trickster
- Saige Thompson as Laurie, Brad's ex-girlfriend
- Charan Prabhakar as Ethan, an Indian friend of Laurie
- Adam Hendershott as Jim, Brad's best friend
- Valerie C. Walker as Kelly, a store clerk
- Joseph Batzel as Jarvis, the ghost of the mine
- Jordan Chamberlain as Store customer, a customer at Sharon's store
- Cody Walker as Thomas, an always-happy store clerk

== Development ==
The film was originally titled The Mine, before the title was changed to Abandoned Mine. Filming occurred in Utah and California.

The first clips from the film were revealed on August 7, 2013. The first poster was revealed on June 18, 2013. The film was distributed by Gravitas Entertainment. The trailer was released on June 17, 2013, along with information about the release date.

== Reception ==
The Los Angeles Times panned the film, writing that it was "all that its title promises: something generic and empty, with the sense that much has been left behind." The Film Journal was more positive, and wrote that "it delivers a handful of creepy moments and the opening-credits montage of old newspaper accounts of the Jarvis family's fate is genuinely disturbing."
