= Frank D'Amico =

American actor and stand-up comedian

- D'Amico in The Flyboys, 2008
- Born: December 20, 1955; Mount Vernon, New York, U.S.
- Died: June 1, 2008 (aged 52); California, U.S.
- Occupations: Actor, stand-up comedian

Frank D'Amico (December 20, 1955 – June 1, 2008) was an American actor and stand-up comedian. He was best known for playing the comic character Armond in the 2007 film The Dukes.

== Life and career ==
D'Amico was born in Mount Vernon, New York. He attended Mount Vernon High School. After working as a truck driver, he began his career as a stand-up comedian, influenced by Jackie Gleason. He then made appearances in the NBC television talk show The Tonight Show with Jay Leno.

D'Amico guest-starred including The Parkers, Grounded for Life, Michael Hayes, NYPD Blue, and played the recurring role of Chuck the Drain King in the CBS sitcom television series Becker. He also appeared in films such as Kiss the Bride and Back to Back. In 2007, he starred as the comic character Armond in the film The Dukes, starring along with Chazz Palminteri, Robert Davi, Peter Bogdanovich and Elya Baskin. His final credit was in the 2008 the film The Flyboys, playing Sal.

== Death ==
D'Amico died on June 1, 2008 from complications of diabetes at his home in California, at the age of 52.
