= Joey Gutierrez =

American screenwriter

- Born: 1963 (age 62–63); Calumet City, Illinois, United States
- Occupations: Writer, Producer
- Writing career
- Genre: Sitcoms

Joey Gutierrez is a writer and producer of sitcoms for American television. His writing credits include Married... with Children, Murphy Brown, Martin, The Drew Carey Show, Yes, Dear and Still Standing. A former stand-up comedian who began performing at the age of sixteen, he also wrote many of Jerry's routines in the early seasons of Seinfeld. He was a co-executive producer of Yes, Dear, and then became executive producer of Still Standing, along with co-creator Diane Burroughs. Gutierrez is also a member of The Magic Castle. He is represented by the United Talent Agency.

== Writing credits ==
- Married... with Children
  - "The Agony of Defeet" (1990)
- Martin
  - "I've Got a Secret" (1992)
  - "Baby You Can Drive My Car" (1993)
  - "Got To Be There" (1993)
  - "Holiday Blues" (1993)
  - "Love is in Your Face, Part 2" (1994)
  - "I Don't Have the Heart" (1994)
  - "Martin Gets Paid" (1994)
  - "Movin' on In" (1994)
  - "High Noon" (1995)
- Murphy Brown
  - "Brown in Toyland" (1994)
- Bless This House (US)
  - "Company Loves Misery" (1995)
  - "A Fight a Day Keeps the Doctor Away" (1995)
  - "Natural Born Parents" (1996)
- The Drew Carey Show
  - "Mimi's Day Parade" (1996)
  - "It's Your Party and I'll Crash If I Want To" (1996)
  - "Man's Best Same Sex Companion" (1997)
  - "Win a Date with Kate" (1997)
  - "A Very, Very, Very Fine House" (1997)
  - "Howdy Neighbor" (1998)
  - "My Best Friend's Wedding" (1998)
  - "Nicki's Wedding" (1998)
  - "Y2K, You're Okay" (1999)
- Yes, Dear
  - "Greg's Big Day" (2000)
  - "Jimmy Gets a Job" (2000)
  - "Jimmy's Jimmy" (2001)
  - "The Daddies Group" (2001)
  - "No Room to Spare" (2001)
  - "Christine's Journey" (2001)
  - "Kentucky Top Hat" (2001)
  - "Greg's Promotion" (2002)
- Still Standing
  - "Pilot" (2002)
  - "Still in School" (2002)
  - "Still Negotiating" (2003)
  - "Still Looking for Love" (2004)
  - "Still Graduating" (2006)
- Rita Rocks
  - "Lies, Lies, Lies, Yeah-ah" (2008)
  - "Under Pressure" (2008)
  - "I Write The Songs" (2008)
  - "What's Love Got To Do with It" (2009)
  - "Breaking Up is Hard to Do" (2009)
  - "Vogue" (2009)
  - "Bad Company" (2009)
  - "Anchors Weight" (2009)
- Retired at 35
  - "Hit It and Quit It" (2011)
  - "The Gifters" (2012)
- Raising Hope
  - "The Walk for the Runs" (2012)
  - "The Old Girl" (2013)
  - "Burt Bucks" (2013)
  - "The One Where They Get High" (2013)
- Last Man Standing
  - "Big Shots" (2014)
  - "Kyle's Friend" (2015)
  - "Polar Run" (2016)
- The Kids Are Alright
  - "Little Cyst" (2018)
  - "The Love List" (2019)

== Producing credits ==
- Bless This House (US)(1995) - Producer
- The Norm Show (1999) - Consulting Producer
- Yes, Dear (2000) - Co-executive Producer
- Still Standing (2002) - Executive Producer
- Rita Rocks (2008) - Consulting Producer
- Retired at 35 (2011) - Consulting Producer
- The Exes (2011) - Consulting Producer
- Raising Hope (2012) - Executive Producer
- Last Man Standing (2014) - Executive Producer
- The Kids Are Alright (2018) - Consulting Producer

== Sources ==
- Joey Gutierrez at IMDb
- 'The Major Players in Still Standing' (USA Today)
- 'Duo Standing Tall in 20th Deal' (Variety)
