= Diane Burroughs =

American television producer and writer

- Born: 1960s Mount Prospect, Illinois
- Occupations: Writer, Producer
- Writing career
- Genre: Sitcoms

Diane Burroughs is a writer and producer of sitcoms for American television. Her writing credits include Married... with Children, Murphy Brown, Martin, The Drew Carey Show, Yes, Dear and Still Standing. She was a co-executive producer of Yes, Dear, and then became executive producer of Still Standing, along with co-creator Joey Gutierrez. Prior to writing, Burroughs had a short stint doing stand-up comedy. She is represented by the United Talent Agency.

== Recent activity ==
In spring of 2005, heavy rainfall in Southern California recharged a local aquifer, reviving a dormant spring beneath Burroughs' house. With no support from officials in her district (Los Angeles 4th) and the Los Angeles Department of Water and Power, her only recourse was to install a pump and divert the thousands of gallons of water issuing from the spring to the nearest storm drain.

Burroughs served as a panelist for the Academy of Television Arts & Sciences' "Women in Prime" event. The forum, held on March 14, 2006, focused on ageism, sexism and other concerns of women in the entertainment industry.

== Writing credits ==
- Married... with Children
  - "The Agony of Defeet" (1990)
- Martin
  - "I've Got a Secret" (1992)
  - "Baby You Can Drive My Car" (1993)
  - "Got To Be There" (1993)
  - "Holiday Blues" (1993)
  - "I Don't Have the Heart" (1994)
  - "Martin Gets Paid" (1994)
  - "Movin' on In" (1994)
  - "High Noon" (1995)
- Murphy Brown
  - "Brown in Toyland" (1994)
- Bless This House (US)
  - "Company Loves Misery" (1995)
  - "A Fight a Day Keeps the Doctor Away" (1995)
  - "Natural Born Parents" (1996)
- The Drew Carey Show
  - "Mimi's Day Parade" (1996)
  - "It's Your Party and I'll Crash If I Want To" (1996)
  - "Man's Best Same Sex Companion" (1997)
  - "Win a Date with Kate" (1997)
  - "A Very, Very, Very Fine House" (1997)
  - "Howdy Neighbor" (1998)
  - "My Best Friend's Wedding" (1998)
  - "Nicki's Wedding" (1998)
  - "Y2K, You're Okay" (1999)
- Yes, Dear
  - "Greg's Big Day" (2000)
  - "Jimmy Gets a Job" (2000)
  - "Jimmy's Jimmy" (2001)
  - "The Daddies Group" (2001)
  - "No Room to Spare" (2001)
  - "Christine's Journey" (2001)
  - "Kentucky Top Hat" (2001)
  - "Greg's Promotion" (2002)
- Still Standing
  - "Pilot" (2002)
  - "Still in School" (2002)
  - "Still Negotiating" (2003)
  - "Still Looking for Love" (2004)
  - "Still Graduating" (2006)

== Producing credits ==
- Bless This House (US) (1995) - Producer
- The Norm Show (1999) - Consulting Producer
- Yes, Dear (2000) - Co-executive Producer
- Still Standing (2002) - Executive Producer

== Sources ==
- 'Springtime in Hollywood' (LA Weekly)
- 'The Academy of Television Arts and Sciences Presents "Women in Prime"'
- 'The Major Players in Still Standing' (USA Today)
- 'Duo Standing Tall in 20th Deal' (Variety)
