= Wendy's Got the Heat =

2003 autobiography by Wendy Williams

- Author: Wendy Williams; Karen Hunter
- Language: English
- Subject: Autobiography
- Publisher: Atria Books
- Publication date: August 2003
- Media type: Print
- ISBN: 0-7434-7021-4
- OCLC: 52724929
- Dewey Decimal: 791.4402/8/092 B
- LC Class: PN1991.4.W57 A3 2003

Wendy's Got the Heat is a 2003 autobiography by American broadcaster and media personality Wendy Williams, co-written with journalist Karen Hunter.

== Background ==
I always knew I wanted to write a book, and I thought it would be a tell-all gossip book. I didn't think it would be the story of my life because I'm just a deejay and who would think people would be interested?

— Wendy Williams on her original motive for writing a book

While on her WBLS radio show in 2002, Wendy Williams expressed interest in writing a book. Three Simon & Schuster employees who regularly listened to the program heard Williams' statement and contacted her. Publishers from Atria Books and Pocket Books met with Williams and agreed an autobiography would be appropriate given her past experiences with drug use, miscarriage, and public feud with employers at WQHT, which they felt would "motivate women facing similar challenges in their struggles for success". After Williams's agent signed a North American distribution deal for the book, she coauthored it with journalist Karen Hunter.

== Publication and promotion ==
Atria Books released Wendy's Got the Heat in hardcover on August 1, 2003. To promote it, Williams scheduled appearances and book signings at libraries and bookstores in New York City, Washington, D.C., and Philadelphia. She also marketed it at the year's Harlem Book Fair, where it sold 400 copies. Wendy's Got the Heat debuted at number nine on the nonfiction New York Times Best Seller list for the week ended August 9, 2003. On Essence magazine's hardcover nonfiction bestsellers list—which is based on sales at African-American bookstores—it entered at number one. The following August, Pocket Books released it in mass market paperback.

== Reception ==
Wendy's Got the Heat received mixed reviews from critics. In the Library Journal, Mark Bay compared the autobiography favorably to those by radio personalities Howard Stern and Mancow Muller for discussing topics like drug addiction and miscarriage instead of "preening rants and juvenile infatuations with genitalia". Writing for QBR The Black Book Review, Kecia Palmer-Cousins thought the inclusion of these experiences made the book more candid than a typical autobiography. In the New York Amsterdam News, Renee Minus White appreciated that Williams "is as personal about her own dramatic and often complicated life as she asks her [radio] guests to be". Publishers Weekly felt it lacked information regarding Williams' job responsibilities as a disc jockey. In his book Hip-Hop Revolution in the Flesh, scholar Greg Thomas felt Williams was hypocritical for promoting Queen's English while the autobiography opens with the line "Bitches and niggas every day are practicing to do my shit." Kirkus Reviews agreed, regarding the statement "there is no excuse for not being able to speak well" contradictory because the book's "narrative [is written] in the most casual of street slang".

Critics differed regarding the effectiveness of anecdotes about achieving success in life. Tim Butler of the African-American newspaper Tri-State Defender wrote that the autobiography "offers readers a wealth of lessons on everything from how to achieve their goals to how to live their lives". Palmer-Cousins considered the quote "Nothing is guaranteed. Learn from your mistakes and move on and above all else be true to yourself" as a useful life lesson. In contrast, Publishers Weekly thought the statement "getting high with muthafuckas doesn't do anything for you except give people something to talk about" lacked depth, and Kirkus Reviews considered the book's relationship and career advice "embarrassingly simplistic".
