= Wendy Williams =

American media personality and television host (born 1964)

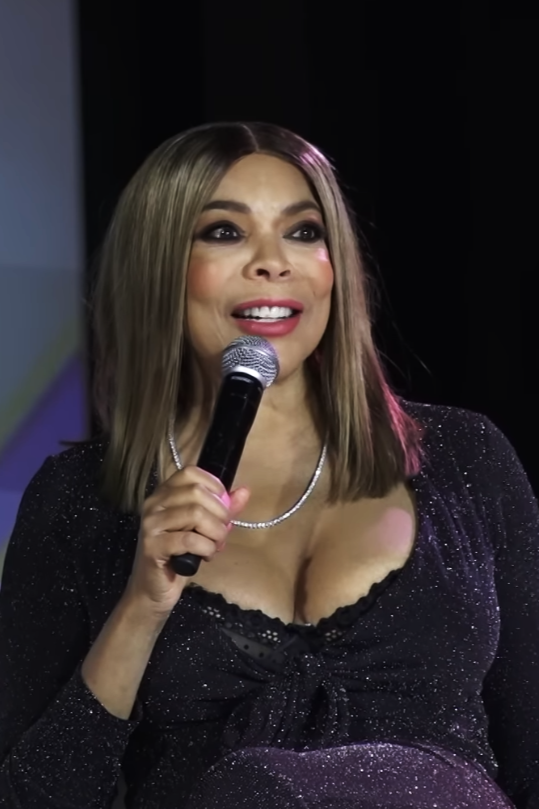
- Williams in 2022
- Born: Wendy Joan Williams; July 18, 1964 (age 62); Asbury Park, New Jersey, U.S.
- Other name: Wendy Williams Hunter (Note: Sources have used both Wendy Williams Hunter and simply Wendy Hunter as Williams' legal name.)
- Education: Northeastern University (BA)
- Occupations: Broadcaster; media personality; writer
- Years active: 1986–2023
- Television: The Wendy Williams Experience; The Wendy Williams Show; Wendy Williams: What a Mess!
- Spouses: Bert Girigorie (m. 1994; div. 1995) Kevin Hunter (m. 1999; div. 2020) (Note: Sources differ regarding the year of Williams' marriage to Hunter. While some publications give 1997, her divorce filing lists 1999.)
- Children: 1

Wendy Williams Hunter (née Wendy Joan Williams; born July 18, 1964) is an American former broadcaster, media personality and author. Williams began her career as a radio DJ and quickly became known as a shock jock in New York City. She gained notoriety for her confrontational interviews of celebrities. The VH1 reality series The Wendy Williams Experience broadcast events surrounding her radio show in 2006. From 2008 to 2021, she hosted the nationally syndicated television talk show The Wendy Williams Show.

Williams was inducted into the National Radio Hall of Fame in 2009. On her 50th birthday, the council of Asbury Park, New Jersey, renamed the street on which she grew up to Wendy Williams Way. Her other endeavors include authoring several books, appearances in various films and television shows and touring her stand-up comedy show. She has also created a fashion line, a wig line and a jewelry collection.

Due to health complications, Williams retired from hosting The Wendy Williams Show in 2021. She was placed under a guardianship one year later and was diagnosed with primary progressive aphasia and frontotemporal dementia in 2023. Williams' legal counsel began litigation against the guardianship in December 2025 after the findings of a court-ordered medical evaluation were released. In it, a neurologist diagnosed Williams with alcohol-related dementia, recommending that her guardianship be terminated as the findings did not indicate she was affected by a progressive form of aphasia or dementia.

== Early life ==
Wendy Joan Williams was born on July 18, 1964, in Asbury Park, New Jersey. She is the second of three children born to Shirley (née Skinner) (1937–2020) and Thomas Dwayne Williams (1931–2026). The couple had a combined three master's degrees; Shirley was a special education teacher while Thomas was a teacher and school principal who in 1969 became the first black school administrator in Red Bank, New Jersey. Following race riots in Asbury Park in 1970, the family moved to the predominantly white, middle income suburb of Wayside in Ocean Township, New Jersey. They attended a Baptist church and visited the town of Oak Bluffs, Massachusetts, each summer. As a child, doctors recommended Williams be medicated to control her hyperactivity. She suffered from poor body image due to the diet her parents put her on after gaining weight in elementary school. Williams was a Brownie in the Girl Scouts and volunteered as a candy striper. Her parents believed she would become a nurse.

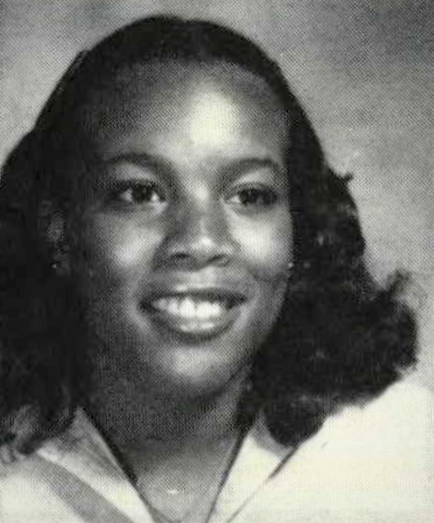
Williams as a sophomore in Ocean Township High School's 1980 yearbook

Williams acted as an announcer at her younger brother's Little League Baseball games. She graduated from Ocean Township High School in 1982 among four black students, ranking 360th in the class of 363. Her academic performance contrasted with that of her older sister, who received a university scholarship at the age of 16. As she was able to use "white" diction instead of African-American Vernacular English, Williams's white classmates considered her one of their own and freely used the word nigger around her. She did not get along with the other black students and said their only commonality was smoking cannabis. According to Williams, she did not listen to hip hop music and instead listened to rock bands like AC/DC because they were popular with her classmates. Due to her suburban upbringing, Williams considers herself "a multicultural woman who happens to be Black".

Williams attended Northeastern University in Boston with the intent of becoming a television anchor. Less than a month after starting, she switched from television communications to radio because she could advance her career faster—a move which her parents disapproved. Williams graduated in 1986 with a Bachelor of Arts degree in communication and, to appease her parents, a minor in journalism. She was a disc jockey for the college radio station, WRBB, where rapper LL Cool J was her first celebrity interviewee. As an intern for Matt Siegel at contemporary hit radio station WXKS-FM, Williams recapped the soap operas Dallas and Dynasty on air. In 2021, Williams revealed that she was date raped while in college by R&B singer Sherrick.

== Media career ==
=== 1986–1994: Career beginnings, WQHT, and WRKS ===
Two weeks after graduating from Northeastern, Williams began her career as a disc jockey working for the small, calypso and reggae-oriented WVIS in Frederiksted, U.S. Virgin Islands, but disliked the role because she did not learn as much about radio from her colleagues as she expected. Due to low pay and isolation from her family, Williams began sending resumes and demo tapes of herself to other radio stations. She left WVIS after eight months and obtained a position at Washington, D.C.'s WOL, but found its oldies radio format incompatible with her personality. Williams continued sending tapes to other stations and on November 1, 1987, began as a weekend fill-in on New York City's WQHT. After the urban contemporary station hired her full-time to work overnight shifts, she left WOL.

Williams was fired from WQHT after two years and briefly worked overnight shifts at WPLJ before being hired by WRKS. Initially working as a fill-in, WRKS gave Williams a non-compete clause and permanent morning position in May 1990 after WBLS began poaching its employees. She joined Jeff Foxx and Spider Webb as part of the station's "Wake-Up Club". There, Williams began gossiping about rappers and celebrities during a segment called "Dish the Dirt". Those she talked about, such as Bill Cosby and Russell Simmons, called the station and (unsuccessfully) demanded she be fired. As she grew into a popular radio personality, WRKS moved Williams to host the evening drive time slot in April 1991. By 1993, she was the highest-rated host in her time slot in the New York City market and received a Billboard Radio Award for R&B Major Market Radio Air Personality of the Year.

Williams co-hosted American Urban Radio Networks' syndicated Top 30 USA song countdown program in 1993 and USA Music Magazine in 1994. By mid-1994, WRKS had suffered a ratings decline amid competition from hip hop-oriented WQHT, which was owned by Emmis Broadcasting. In an effort to reverse the trend, WRKS moved Williams back to mornings on September 26, 1994, where she hosted a program titled "Wendy and Company". However, Emmis purchased WRKS less than three months later and transferred Williams to WQHT, where she began hosting the evening drive time slot on December 12, 1994. As WRKS was reformatted into an urban adult contemporary outlet geared toward older audiences, they believed Williams would better reflect WQHT's younger demographic.

=== 1994–2001: WQHT, website, move to WUSL ===
By this time, Williams attended parties to gain information which she would report on air in addition to reading tabloid newspapers. She continued gossip segments and gave relationship advice to teenage girls during "Ask Wendy". Williams's ratings increased dramatically after she read aloud a magazine article about an anonymous rapper confessing to being gay. She became known for speculating about his identity and spread rumors that there was not one, but multiple gay rappers who were not open about their sexuality. Among her insinuations was that Tupac Shakur was raped in prison, which he denied. Williams employed the term "pinky's up" when alleging someone was gay and regularly used the slur faggot, which she considered to be inoffensive. Her comments contributed to an increase of homophobia in hip hop culture.

Williams created a website, www.gowendy.com, as an offshoot of her radio program. Featuring photos and rumors of celebrities, it received up to 100,000 views per day. In April 1997, WQHT suspended Williams for one week after mentioning her website on air, which displayed a doctored image of Bad Boy Records executive Sean Combs naked from the waist down having sex with another man. The station suspended Williams again in September 1997 for online comments insinuating that her colleague Angie Martinez's boyfriend Q-Tip was gay. Upon her return after deleting the post a month later, Williams called the Bad Boy Records girl group Total "broke hoes" after their comments favoring her suspension. WQHT permanently removed Williams, and her fans protested outside of their offices. By this time, Williams had received more than 50 letters from the station regarding her "lack of good judgment". She speculated her removal was due to pressure from music industry executives and stood by her comments, stating: "I stopped caring about artists when I realized it's more lucrative to talk about them than with them."

She was fired from Hot 97 in 1998. Williams was hired by a Philadelphia urban station, WUSL ("Power 99FM"). She was very open about her personal life on air, discussing her miscarriages, breast enhancement surgery, and former drug addiction. She helped the station move from 14th place in the ratings to 2nd.

=== 2001–2008: WBLS ===
In 2001, Williams returned to the New York airwaves when WBLS hired her full-time for a syndicated 2–6 p.m. time slot. Williams' friend, MC Spice of Boston, offered his voiceover services to the show, often adding short rap verses tailored specifically for Williams' show. The New York Times stated that her "show works best when its elements – confessional paired with snarkiness – are conflated". By 2008, she was syndicated in Redondo Beach, California; Shreveport, Louisiana; Wilmington, Delaware; Toledo, Ohio; Columbia, South Carolina; Emporia, Virginia; Lake Charles, Louisiana; Tyler, Texas; and Alexandria, Louisiana, among other markets. Williams left her radio show in 2009 to focus on her television program and spend more time with her family.

Media outlets have described Williams's 2003 interview with Whitney Houston as her most infamous. After Williams asked Houston about her marriage and breast implants, they began a shouting match and Houston said she would have fought Williams if she were younger. In a later interview with Williams, Houston's confidant Robyn Crawford said they planned to confront Williams years earlier after she talked about Houston and her relationship with Crawford on air. Wu-Tang Clan performer Method Man had a personal and publicized conflict with Williams in 2006 after she revealed details about his wife's cancer diagnosis.

=== 2008–2016: Breakthrough with The Wendy Williams Show ===
In 2008, Debmar-Mercury offered Williams a six-week television trial of her own talk show. A syndicated daytime talk show hosted by Williams titled Wendy's World was poised to debut in fall 1997, but never aired. On July 14, 2008, Williams debuted her daytime talk show, The Wendy Williams Show, in four cities during the summer of 2008. During the tryout, The New York Times remarked that the show created a "breakthrough in daytime" by introducing the genre of the "backtalk show". After a successful run, Fox signed a deal with Debmar-Mercury to broadcast the show nationally on their stations beginning in July 2009. In addition, BET picked up cable rights to broadcast the show at night. In 2010, BET started airing the show internationally in 54 countries through BET International. The show attracted 2.4 million daily viewers on average, with Williams trading off daily with Ellen DeGeneres as the number one female host on daytime television.

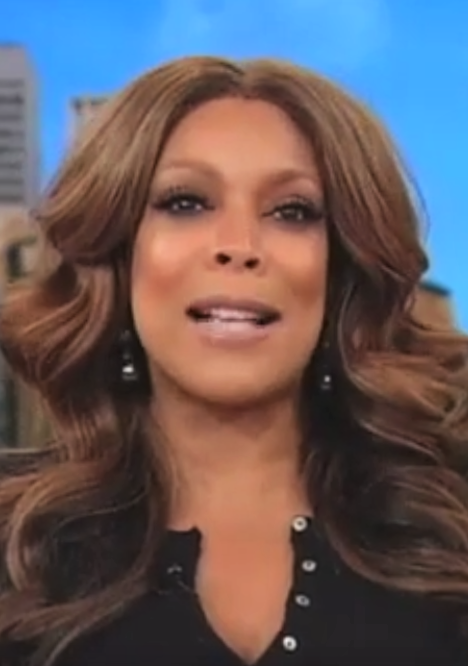
Williams on The Wendy Williams Show in 2011

Williams hosted a game show for GSN called Love Triangle (2011) for which she and her husband Kevin Hunter served as executive producers. Williams played a judge on the Lifetime network show Drop Dead Diva (2011) and served as a guest judge on The Face (2013). Williams was paired with Tony Dovolani as a contestant on the twelfth season of Dancing with the Stars; she was eliminated second. Williams later alleged the show's producers portrayed her as an angry black woman, a racial stereotype. Williams appeared in the film adaptation of Steve Harvey's book, Act Like a Lady, Think Like a Man, titled Think Like a Man (2012), and its sequel, Think Like a Man Too (2014). In 2012, it was announced Williams would enter into a "production alliance" with producers Suzanne de Passe and Madison Jones to create movies and television shows aimed at multicultural audiences. These projects will appear under the heading "Wendy Williams presents" and their first project will be VH1 adaptation of a Star Jones novel.

In February 2013, it was announced that Williams and her husband and manager, Kevin, were launching a reality television production company, Wendy Williams Productions. that will produce unscripted content, including reality television and game shows. Williams was an executive producer on the show Celebrities Undercover (2014). Williams also executive produced a biographical film for Lifetime, Aaliyah: The Princess of R&B, which premiered on November 15, 2014. The film attracted controversy due to its casting and depiction of Aaliyah's relationship with R. Kelly. and received predominantly negative reviews from critics. In September 2015, the documentary series Death By Gossip with Wendy Williams premiered on the Investigation Discovery channel, both hosted and produced by Williams. In 2013, Williams was cast to play the role of Matron "Mama" Morton on the Broadway musical Chicago. She began her tenure on July 2 and finished her seven-week run on August 11, 2013. Her preparations for the musical were documented in the TV Guide docuseries Wendy Williams: How You Doin', Broadway?!, which was produced by her own production company, Wendy Williams Productions.

Williams was accused of victim blaming singer Kesha in 2016 after questioning why she did not film the alleged sexual abuse by record producer Dr. Luke against her. Williams later apologized for the remarks and stated "unfortunately a lot of people lie about rape so I was just being skeptical".

=== 2017–2021: Personal and professional issues, end of talk show ===
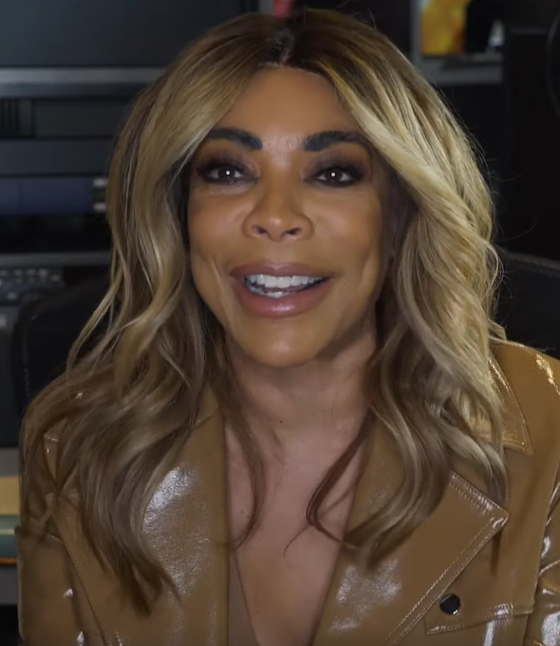
Williams in 2019

Williams's health issues caused her to take multiple hiatuses from hosting her show, including three weeks in 2018 and six weeks in 2019.

During this time, Williams received criticism for several remarks she made on her show. In January 2018, Williams was criticized by activist Tarana Burke after saying an alleged 14-year-old sexual assault victim of R. Kelly gave him consent and that she was tired of the #MeToo movement. Williams stood by her comments, saying "I feel like I know things about R. Kelly that he's told me himself that I promised I would keep in confidence." While talking about actor Joaquin Phoenix in January 2020, Williams used her finger to pull up a part of her lip to resemble a cleft palate, which Phoenix denies having. Although Williams said she found it attractive, critics claimed that it appeared as if she was mocking him. After a Change.org petition in favor of firing her garnered over 70,000 signatures, Williams apologized on Twitter and her show donated to cleft palate charities. The following month, Williams was criticized for making homophobic comments. While talking about the fictional holiday "Galentine's Day", she criticized gay men for wearing skirts and high heels and suggested they aspire to be women. Williams later apologized for her remarks. While talking about the murder of Amie Harwick shortly thereafter, Williams made a joke referring to Harwick's ex-fiancé Drew Carey and his job on The Price Is Right, saying that show's catchphrase, "Come on down!", in response to news that Harwick was thrown to her death.

Williams hosted her show remotely from March to May 2020 due to the COVID-19 pandemic, after which she took a hiatus due to fatigue caused by Graves' disease. She returned to a studio broadcast in September of that year. The next month, Williams competed in season four of The Masked Singer as "Lips" where she was mostly sitting on something due to the weight of the costume and was eliminated after her first appearance.

In July 2021, Williams received criticism for her tone while covering the murder of 19-year-old TikTok star Swavy. After comparing their social media followers, Williams said, "I have no idea who this is", and casually informed her studio audience of his death. Williams did not return to her show after that month due to health issues; guests hosted in her absence. She tested positive for a breakthrough infection of COVID-19 in September 2021.

Production of The Wendy Williams Show concluded in 2022 due to Williams's ongoing health issues.

A three-part docuseries about the show, Clap If You Care: The Wendy Williams Show, produced by former executive producer Suzanne Bass and featuring insights from 20 former staffers is slated to premiere on Peacock in 2027. Williams herself is not involved in the project.

== Other ventures ==
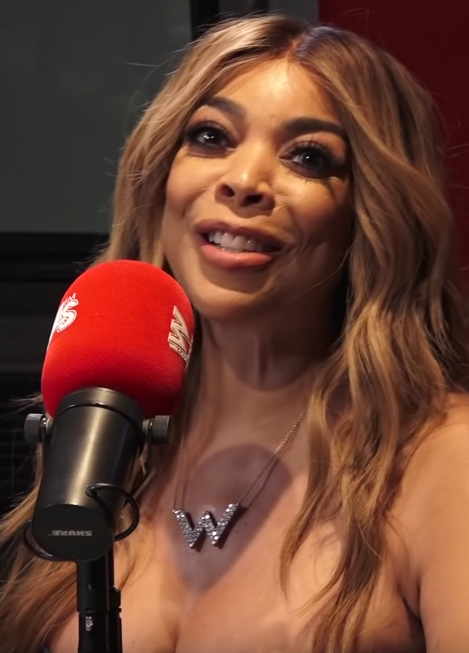
Williams in 2018

=== Authorship ===
Williams is the author of three non-fiction books. She released an autobiography co-written with New York Daily News journalist Karen Hunter in August 2003 titled Wendy's Got the Heat. It focuses on her life, including childhood troubles, drug addiction, and marriages. Published by Atria, it debuted at number nine on The New York Times Best Seller list for nonfiction. The autobiography was reprinted in paperback in August 2004, a month before the debut of Williams' second book, The Wendy Williams Experience, which contains celebrity gossip and interviews. In May 2013, Williams released an advice book, Ask Wendy. Over the years, Williams wrote columns for Honey and Life & Style magazines.

Williams has also written several fiction books, including a trilogy about the life and career of radio shock jock Ritz Harper. She co-authored the first two novels, Drama Is Her Middle Name (2006) and Is the Bitch Dead, or What? (2007), with Hunter. Zondra Hughes co-wrote the third installment Ritz Harper Goes to Hollywood! (2009). Media outlets considered Ritz Harper similar to Williams. In 2014, Williams released a romance novel, Hold Me in Contempt. She said it was co-authored with an English professor ghostwriter.

=== Music and comedy ===
Williams interviewed Blu Cantrell in 2003; the conversation was released as a DVD on the singer's album Bittersweet. Williams and Virgin Records released a compilation album, Wendy Williams Brings the Heat: Volume 1, in June 2005 featuring various rap acts, including M.O.P., Jadakiss, and Young Jeezy. It sold 29,000 copies by November of that year according to Nielsen SoundScan.

In 2014, Lipshtick called Williams to participate in their first all-female-based comedy series at the Venetian in Las Vegas. Williams made her sold-out comedy debut on July 11, 2014. Williams' comedy tour was called "The Sit-down Comedy Tour". Williams returned to Lipshtick on October 31, 2014, and November 1, 2014, after she made a sold-out debut in July. Williams hosted her "How You Laughin'" Comedy Series at NJPAC on November 15, 2014, featuring Luenell, Jonathan Martin, Pat Brown, Hadiyah Robinson, and Meme Simpson. In 2015, Williams announced a 12-city comedy tour called "The Wendy Williams Sit Down Tour: Too Real For Stand-Up."

=== Philanthropy and activism ===
In 2005, Williams funded a $1,000 scholarship for a black female high school student who sought to major in communications in college. Subsequent recipients in 2006 and 2007 also received internships at WBLS. She led an effort to donate money and school supplies to Asbury Park Middle School in 2009. Williams is pro-choice for abortion.

Following the aftermath of Hurricane Sandy in 2012, Williams visited her hometown of Asbury Park and paid for the hot meals of 300 people, face painting, and balloon animals for children. She supported Barack Obama in that year's presidential election, and promoted an NAACP voter helpline. Williams posed for PETA's "I'd Rather Go Naked Than Wear Fur" campaign in 2012, stating "we should all try to be comfortable in our own skin and let the animals keep theirs." Williams also headlined during Philly Pride that year.

In 2013, she participated in The Heart Truth fashion show to raise awareness for women's breast cancer. Williams supported the 2015 removal of the Confederate battle flag from the South Carolina State House. In 2018, she promoted Be Here (behere.org) while on a 10-city tour with a goal to raise $10 million in 5 years for drug and substance abuse victims. Williams attended Los Angeles Pride in June 2019 with Blac Chyna, and rode on a float in July at the WorldPride parade in New York. In September, Williams became an ambassador and honorary board member of the Lymphatic Education & Research Network.

==== The Hunter Foundation ====
Williams and her ex-husband created The Hunter Foundation in 2014, a non-profit organization that funded anti-poverty programs and provided resources to people as they transitioned from drug addiction to recovery. During the Holiday season in 2016, the couple hosted dinners for over 1000 for those in need through the foundation. In 2017, the organization donated $1000 for the opening of an emergency food pantry. In 2018, the organization paid for a student's college tuition. During March 2019, The Hunter Foundation launched a 24/7 national hotline, 1-888-5HUNTER, for those struggling with addiction. The Foundation was dissolved following Williams' divorce from Hunter in May 2019. Following the dissolution, Williams partnered with SNAX-Sational Brands and Operation Backpack with the objective to raise funds to provide backpacks filled with various school supplies for children in New York homeless and domestic violence shelters.

=== Products and endorsements ===
While working for WRKS, Williams was a spokesperson for a hip-hop clothing brand. In 2006, she became a spokesperson for George Veselles champagne and Alizé liqueurs. Williams debuted a jewelry and shoe line on shopping channel QVC called "Adorn" in 2012. Williams started a "Save the Twinkie" campaign amidst the parent company's filing for bankruptcy, setting up a Facebook page and promoting the snack on The Wendy Williams Show. The shoe manufacturer's lawyer alleged she never paid the production cost. In 2013, Williams released a wig collection to online retailers. She sold a self-titled clothing line in 2015 on shopping channel HSN and continued the partnership the following year by releasing shoe and winter clothing collections.

== Personal life ==
In 1994, Williams married her first husband, Bertrand "Bert" Girigorie. She said they separated after five months and divorced about 18 months later. Williams met her second husband, Kevin Hunter, in 1994; they married on November 30, 1999. Her husband became her agent. She suffered multiple miscarriages before giving birth to their son in August 2000. In April 2019, Williams filed for divorce due to irreconcilable differences after Hunter fathered a baby with a mistress. Although the divorce was finalized in January 2020, her legal surname remains Hunter.

=== Health issues ===
Williams has been open about her cocaine addiction in the late 1980s and early 1990s, for which she never received treatment.

In late October 2017, Williams fainted during a live broadcast of her show from dehydration. Williams was often in the news for the next two years because of her health issues and relationship with Hunter. In February 2018, Williams disclosed that she has Graves' disease which causes hyperthyroidism, conditions she had been diagnosed with nearly two decades prior. Due to the increased pressure behind her eyes, they sometimes have a pronounced bulging appearance. Williams wears wigs in public because her thyroid condition thins her natural hair. She fractured her shoulder in December 2018. In March 2019, Williams said she had been living in a sober house "for some time" and that she has vertigo. Later that year, Williams revealed she had been diagnosed with lymphedema, a condition that causes swelling in her ankles.

==== Dementia diagnosis and guardianship ====
In 2022, Lori Schiller, Williams' former financial advisor, froze her Wells Fargo bank accounts. Schiller requested a hearing from the New York Supreme Court to determine if Williams was legally incapacitated and in need of a temporary guardianship. Williams denied these claims on her mental health. Attorney Sabrina Morrissey was appointed as Williams' temporary financial guardian by an unnamed judge in March 2022. After being confirmed in May, Morrissey remained in that position until July. From September to October 2022, Williams stayed in a long-term care facility to receive treatment for her health issues. She returned to the public eye in November and prepared to launch a podcast. However, it was not released to the public.

In 2023, Williams was diagnosed with primary progressive aphasia and frontotemporal dementia. She was booked into a long-term care facility by Morrissey, who had been appointed as Williams' legal guardian. A documentary chronicling Williams's life from August 2022 to April 2023, Where Is Wendy Williams?, aired on Lifetime in February 2024. Morrissey unsuccessfully sued to prevent its release, claiming the documentary exploited Williams.

Legal documents filed by Morrissey issued in November 2024 described Williams as "cognitively impaired, permanently disabled and legally incapacitated." Williams denied these claims in an appearance on the radio show The Breakfast Club in January 2025. She likened her experience to "emotional abuse" and criticized the restrictions placed upon her by the terms of the guardianship. Her niece, Alex Finnie, appeared on the show to express support for Williams and disputed that she was incapacitated. Finnie encouraged people to use the hashtag #FreeWendy or donate to a GoFundMe account she set up for Williams. In February, Williams was interviewed by Nightline co-host Byron Pitts. In the interview, she explained she was placed in a unit specialising in treating memory difficulties and described the facility as a "prison", saying "Look, I don't belong here at all. This is ridiculous."

On March 10, Williams dropped a note which read "Help! Wendy!!" out of the window of her room on the fifth floor of an assisted living facility in Manhattan. She was seen in the window waving her arms while she spoke on the phone to a reporter from the New York Post. Shortly thereafter, the police arrived at the scene and Williams was seen leaving the building, surrounded by a group of police officers who helped her into a waiting ambulance. She was then transported to Lenox Hill Hospital for an independent cognitive examination. Williams scored 10/10. Two days after the incident, Williams appeared on The View to discuss her case, stating that she had quit using alcohol.

In June 2025, it was reported that Williams' ex-husband, Kevin Hunter, filed a lawsuit on behalf of Williams against Morrissey and the unnamed judge on June 18. Hunter accused them of committing abuse, fraud and neglect against Williams through the guardianship. In December, Williams' attorney, Joe Tacopina, stated that Dr. Samuel E. Gandy, a neurologist who specializes in Alzheimer's Disease, had evaluated Williams and determined that she "does not have frontotemporal dementia", and that she may have suffered from alcohol-induced dementia. The condition is not necessarily permanent and can often be resolved following abstinence from alcohol. Tacopina confirmed that Williams no longer drinks. Tacopina also claimed that Williams' guardianship would be terminated by the end of 2025. As of August 2026, Williams' legal counsel are still engaged in litigation concerning the termination of the guardianship. On August 21, in a rare public sighting, Williams was walking through New York City when a member of the paparazzi "asked her what she wished her fans knew about what she's been going through". She simply replied "I want out!" before being guided into a building by the man she was walking with.

== Filmography ==
=== Film ===
Year	Title	Role	Notes
2004	The Cookout	Reporter #2	
2011	The Cookout 2	Herself	
2012	Think Like a Man	Gail	
2013	World War Z	Herself	
2014	Think Like a Man Too	Gail	
2014	Santa Con	Pastor Ruth	TV movie
2016	Ice Age: The Great Egg-Scapade	Condor Mom (voice)	TV movie
2016	Mike and Dave Need Wedding Dates	Herself	
2018	Homegrown Christmas	Herself	TV movie

=== Television ===
Year	Title	Role	Notes
1992	Martin	Herself	Episode: "Radio Days"
1995	New York Undercover	WGHT DJ	Episode: "You Get No Respect"
2006	The Wendy Williams Experience	Herself/Host	Main Host
2007	Dice: Undisputed	Herself	Episode: "Dice Back on TV: It's Showtime?"
2008–21	The Wendy Williams Show	Herself/Host	Main Host
2009	Biography	Herself	Episode: "Boyz II Men"
2010	BBC Breakfast	Herself/Chat Show Host	Episode: "June 10, 2010"
2010	Kathy Griffin: My Life on the D-List	Herself	Episode: "Kathy's Smear Campaign"
2010	Bret Michaels: Life as I Know It	Herself	Episode: "Episode 3"
2010–11	The A-List: New York	Herself/Host	Main Host
2010–12	Bethenny Ever After	Herself	Guest Cast: Season 1 & 3
2011	One Life to Live	Phyllis Rose	Regular Cast
2011	Drop Dead Diva	Judge Mary Rudd	Episode: "Hit and Run"
2011	Dancing with the Stars	Herself/Contestant	Contestant: Season 12
2011	Love Triangle	Herself/Host	Main Host
2011	Braxton Family Values	Herself/Host	Episode: "Braxton Family Reunion"
2011	Mob Wives	Herself/Host	Episode: "Reunion Special"
2012	30 Rock	Herself	Episode: "My Whole Life Is Thunder"
2012	Sesame Street	Herself	Episode: "Afraid of the Bark"
2012	Tamar & Vince	Herself	Episode: "Are You Ready for Tamar?!?"
2013	Home by Novogratz	Herself	Episode: "Wendy Williams Audience"
2013	The Face	Herself	Episode: "Red Carpet Ready?"
2013	Law & Order: Special Victims Unit	Herself	Episode: "Funny Valentine"
2013	Belle's	Herself	Episode: "Runaway Bride"
2013	The Neighbors	Shirley	Episode: "The One with Interspecies F-R-I-E-N-D-S"
2014	Trisha's Southern Kitchen	Herself	Episode: "Straight Up Comfort Food"
2014	The Kitchen	Herself	Episode: "The Chicken Rotisserie Show"
2014	Hell's Kitchen	Herself/Restaurant Patron	Episode: "16 Chefs Compete"
2014	Soul Train Music Awards	Herself/Host	Main Host
2015	American Masters	Herself	Episode: "The Women's List"
2015	Best Time Ever with Neil Patrick Harris	Herself	Episode: "Reba"
2015	Death by Gossip with Wendy Williams	Herself/Host	Main Host
2016	The Dr. Oz Show	Herself/Guest Co-Host	Episode: "Episode #7.93"
2016	The Nightly Show with Larry Wilmore	Herself/Panelist	Episode: "North Korean Satellite & Realistic Barbie"
2017	Nightcap	Herself	Episode: "Go-Fund Yourself"
2017	Odd Mom Out	Herself	Episode: "Blood Bath"
2017	Wild 'n Out	Herself/Team Captain	Episode: "Wendy Williams/Blac Youngsta"
2018	The View	Herself/Guest Co-Host	Episode: "Episode #21.81"
2018	Saturday Night Live	Herself	Episode: "Adam Driver/Kanye West"
2019	Surviving R. Kelly	Herself	Main Guest: Season 1
2019	Project Runway All Stars	Herself/Guest Judge	Episode: "Pedal to the Medal"
2020	The Real Housewives of Atlanta	Herself	Recurring Cast: Season 12
2020	The Masked Singer	Herself/Lips	Contestant: Season 4
2021	That Damn Michael Che	Herself	Episode: "Only Built 4 Leather Suits"
2024	Where Is Wendy Williams?	Herself	Main Cast
2025	IMPACT x Nightline: What's Happening with Wendy Williams?	Herself	Episode: "IMPACT x Nightline: What's Happening with Wendy Williams?"

=== Documentary ===
Year	Title
2009	Kiss and Tail: The Hollywood Jumpoff
2018	Fahrenheit 11/9
2021	Wendy Williams: What a Mess!
2021	You're Watching Video Music Box
2025	TMZ Presents: Saving Wendy
2025	Trapped: What Is Happening to Wendy Williams?

== Accolades ==
Awards and nominations received by Wendy Williams
Award	Year	Category	Nominee	Result	Ref(s)
Billboard Radio Award	1993	R&B Major Market Radio Air Personality of the Year	Herself	Won	
Daytime Emmy Award	2015	Outstanding Entertainment Talk Show Host	Herself	Nominated	
Daytime Emmy Award	2015	Outstanding Talk Show Entertainment	The Wendy Williams Show	Nominated	
Daytime Emmy Award	2016	Outstanding Entertainment Talk Show Host	Herself	Nominated	
Daytime Emmy Award	2016	Outstanding Talk Show Entertainment	The Wendy Williams Show	Nominated	
Daytime Emmy Award	2017	Outstanding Entertainment Talk Show Host	Herself	Nominated	
Daytime Emmy Award	2019	Outstanding Entertainment Talk Show Host	Herself	Nominated	
Hollywood Walk of Fame	2019	—N/a	Herself	2,677th star	
NAACP Image Award	2012	Outstanding Talk Series	The Wendy Williams Show	Nominated	
NAACP Image Award	2015	Outstanding Talk Series	The Wendy Williams Show	Nominated	
NAACP Image Award	2016	Outstanding Talk Series	The Wendy Williams Show	Nominated	
National Radio Hall of Fame	2009	—N/a	Herself	Inducted	
People's Choice Award	2016	Favorite Daytime TV Host	Herself	Nominated	
People's Choice Award	2019	The Daytime Talk Show of 2019	The Wendy Williams Show	Nominated	
People's Choice Award	2020	The Daytime Talk Show of 2020	The Wendy Williams Show	Nominated	
Radio & Records Industry Achievement Award	1999	Urban Personality of the Year	Herself	Won	
Radio & Records Industry Achievement Award	2000	Urban Personality of the Year	Herself	Won	
Radio & Records Industry Achievement Award	2002	Urban Personality/Show of the Year	Herself	Nominated	
Radio & Records Industry Achievement Award	2003	Urban Personality/Show of the Year	Herself	Nominated	
Radio & Records Industry Achievement Award	2004	Urban Personality/Show of the Year	Herself	Nominated	
Radio & Records Industry Achievement Award	2006	Urban AC Personality/Show of the Year	Herself	Won	
Radio & Records Industry Achievement Award	2007	Urban AC Personality/Show of the Year	Herself	Won	
Radio & Records Industry Achievement Award	2008	Urban AC Personality/Show of the Year	Herself	Nominated	

== Bibliography ==
=== Nonfiction ===
- Williams, Wendy; Hunter, Karen (2003). Wendy's Got the Heat (1st ed.). New York City: Atria Books. ISBN 0-7434-7021-4.
- Williams, Wendy; Hunter, Karen (2004). The Wendy Williams Experience (1st ed.). New York City: Dutton. ISBN 0-525-94837-6.
- Williams, Wendy (2013). Ask Wendy (1st ed.). New York City: William Morrow. ISBN 978-0-06-226838-9.

=== Fiction ===
- Williams, Wendy; Hunter, Karen (2006). Drama Is Her Middle Name (1st ed.). New York City: Harlem Moon. ISBN 978-0-7394-7004-6.
- Williams, Wendy; Hunter, Karen (2007). Is the Bitch Dead, or What? (1st ed.). New York City: Harlem Moon. ISBN 978-0-7679-2487-0.
- Williams, Wendy; Hughes, Zondra (2009). Ritz Harper Goes to Hollywood! (1st ed.). New York City: Pocket Books. ISBN 978-1-4165-9288-4.
- Williams, Wendy (2014). Hold Me in Contempt (1st ed.). New York City: William Morrow. ISBN 978-0-06-226841-9.
