= Jenni Ruiza =

- Born: The Bronx, New York, U.S.
- Education: Pace University
- Occupations: Actress, Writer, Producer

Jenni Ruiza is a Latina producer, actress, comedian, and writer from Bronx, New York. She was the co-founder of Comedy High, a comedy production company. She was also a co-host of Fixxx Podcast.

== Early life ==
Ruiza began her career in middle school where she wrote screenplays. She made herself the starring role of each, alongside the women who inspire her, including Bette Midler, Diane Keaton and Meryl Streep. She wanted to star in TV shows and films, focusing on her love for comedy.

== Career ==
Ruiza wanted to do comedic roles, which eventually led her to become a producer. She participated in Latino Stereotypes for Dummies. This short video was written by Jesenia and uses humor to explore the realities of stereotypes that Latinas face in the entertainment industry. Saturday Night Live served as an impetus for this project, as up until 2017 it did not include a Latina comedienne in its cast.

=== Projects ===
The podcast The Fixxx promotes Ruiza and allows her to voice her opinions. Ruiza takes part in feature films, television and commercials. Her works include Full Frontal with Samantha Bee, In Case of Emergency and has been seen in commentary for Buzzfeed, Fusion, and Come Here and Say That with Alicia Menendez.

=== Film, television, sketches and Internet projects ===
Project	Medium	Role
Come Here & Say That	Television	Correspondent/Segment Writer
The Wendy Williams Show	Television	Commentator
Art of Happiness	Coca Cola Commercial	Featured
#BeABreastFriend Campaign	Commercial	Featured
Super Strong Meter Maid	Super Strong Meter Maid Commercial	Lead
Partnership for Healthier America	Commercial	Featured
The Fixxx	Podcast	Co host
Comedy High Productions	Web series	Co Founder
Conan or Bust: Reverend Joseph	FunnyorDie.com	Featured
