= Where Is Wendy Williams? =

2024 American TV documentary series

- Country of origin: United States
- Original language: English
- No. of episodes: 4

Production
- Executive producers: Wendy Williams; Kevin Hunter Jr.; Will Selby; Tara Long; Mark Ford; Pat Lambert; Erica Hanson; Brie Bryant
- Production companies: Entertainment One; Creature Films

Original release
- Network: Lifetime
- Release: February 24 – February 25, 2024

Where Is Wendy Williams? is a 2024 American documentary series. It follows Wendy Williams following the cancellation of her talk show.

It premiered on February 24, 2024, on Lifetime.

== Premise ==
The documentary follows Wendy Williams after the cancellation of her talk show. The series additionally explores Williams suffering mental and physical issues, erratic behavior and declining health, issues with alcohol as well as being placed under a guardianship.

== Episodes ==
| No. | Title | Original release date | U.S. viewers (millions) |
|---|---|---|---|
| 1 | "I'm Not a Crier" | February 24, 2024 | 1.14 |
| 2 | "I Really Want to Be Back on Television" | February 24, 2024 | 1.18 |
| 3 | "I Love Being Famous" | February 25, 2024 | 0.91 |
| 4 | "I Am Gorgeous" | February 25, 2024 | 0.96 |

== Production ==
The documentary series was initially pitched to Lifetime as a documentary following Williams launching a podcast, but as production began, the story changed. Nothing was filmed without permission from Williams or her manager. Williams granted the filmmakers unparalleled access into her life, following the cancellation of The Wendy Williams Show, documenting her life from August 2022 to April 2023, when production stopped due to Williams' health. Producers attempted to speak with Williams' guardian, Sabrina Morrissey; however, she declined to speak with them.

== Lawsuit ==
On February 23, 2024, Williams' guardian, Sabrina Morrissey, filed a lawsuit against Lifetime's parent company A&E Networks to prevent its release, claiming that the documentary was exploitive of Williams. That same day, the court ruled the documentary could air as planned.

== Reception ==
=== Critical reception ===
Joel Keller of Decider stated the series was "hard to watch", writing: "If you are at all interested in what's been going on in her life in the last few years, or have been following the confusing drama around her care, this is a must watch".

Aramide Tinubu of Variety criticized the series as "unsettling and exploitative", writing: "One thing has never been more certain: the cameras should have stopped rolling in Williams' life the moment she left her show's set for the last time".
