= Alizé (drink) =

Line of alcoholic beverages

Alizé is a line of alcoholic drinks. It is produced in several varieties that can be consumed neat (straight) or can be used in mixed drinks. As of 2023, the line consists of ten vodka-based liqueurs, all of which are 16% alcohol (32 US proof). Each liqueur starts with a blend of vodka and passion fruit juice and is then flavored with various other fruit juices.

== History ==
In 1984 Alizé was introduced by the Kobrand Corporation at the Wine and Spirits Wholesalers of America convention in New Orleans. A common company known as L & L was created to produce and distribute Alizé. In 1986, Alizé Gold Passion was introduced in the United States, initially targeting 45- to 55-year-old white women. It did not sell well until around 1994 when its price was dropped from $25 to $16 per bottle in a move to liquidate inventory while around the same time it started to appear in rap videos such as Tupac Shakur's "Thug Passion" and was mentioned in the lyrics of Notorious BIG's 1994 track "Juicy" as well as Nas's 1994 track "Memory Lane (Sittin' in a Park)".

The packaging of Alizé has undergone three major changes: a new bottle shape and an updated label with foil imprinting and a larger name in 2002, followed by a frosted bottle and silk screened label in 2006, and the transition to a clear bottle for all flavors in 2007.

=== Advertising ===
Throughout the 1990s, Alizé’s advertising involved promotions such as a Culinary Mentorship Challenge, which offered the grand prize of a month-long study program at Le Cordon Bleu; another promotion was “Operation Redhead”, a collaboration with Manic Panic, that gave 250 winners the opportunity to become redheads via a special-edition hue of hair dye. From 2016 to 2017, Alizé sponsored the Tupac Shakur biopic “All Eyez on Me”. In 2018, they partnered with The Doughnut Project to create a (limited-time only) rose-colored doughnut with crème filling, topped with an Alizé Pink liqueur and lime glaze, complete with a candied lime finish.

Wendy Williams was the spokesperson for Alizé from 2006 to 2007. Her activities included a 5-city national tour called Alizé LIVE! Presents The Wendy Williams Experience, highlighting her signature radio show.
