= Black Issues Book Review =

American magazine

- Categories: Book review
- Frequency: Bimonthly
- Circulation: 75,000 (2004)
- Founder: William E. Cox, Adrienne Ingrum, and Susan McHenry
- First issue: January–February 1999
- Final issue: September–October 2007
- Country: United States
- Based in: New York City
- ISSN: 1522-0524

Black Issues Book Review was a bimonthly magazine published in New York City, U.S., in which books of interest to African-American readers were reviewed. It was published from 1999 until 2007.

== History and profile ==
Black Issues Book Review was founded in late 1998 by William E. Cox, Adrienne Ingrum, and Susan McHenry. Cox had been the publisher of Black Issues in Higher Education, which ran a single book review in each issue. He wanted to expand its coverage of books, but after considering the large number of books aimed at Black readers, he came to the conclusion that a new magazine would be more appropriate. Ingrum was a book industry veteran, with nearly 20 years of experience in publishing and book-selling. McHenry had served in editorial positions at several magazines, including Black Enterprise, Essence, and Ms.

Library Journal named Black Issues Book Review one of the 10 best new magazines of 1998. The New York Times reported that the magazine sold 40,000 copies of each issue in 2000. By 2004, according to Publishers Weekly, Black Issues Book Review had circulation of 75,000.

In 2005, Black Issues Book Review entered into a partnership with QBR The Black Book Review, a quarterly book review founded in 1992 by Max Rodriguez, whose publishers also managed an annual book fair in Harlem. QBR was merged into Black Issues Book Review.

Target Market News purchased Black Issues Book Review in March 2006. Later that year, Target Market News announced that it would begin publishing Blacks & Books, a monthly supplement for newspapers such as the New York Amsterdam News and the Philadelphia Tribune that serve African-American readers. Blacks & Books was to be produced by members of the Black Issues Book Review staff.

The September–October 2007 issue of Black Issues Book Review was its final issue.
