= Death by Gossip with Wendy Williams =

American documentary TV series

- Also known as: Death by Gossip
- Genre: Documentary
- Presented by: Wendy Williams
- Country of origin: United States
- Original language: English
- No. of seasons: 1
- No. of episodes: 6

Production
- Executive producers: Wendy Williams; Kevin Hunter; Jill Ramsey; Lisa Knapp; Mike Sinclair; David O’Donnell; Ashley Crary; Thomas Cutler
- Camera setup: Multiple
- Running time: 42 minutes
- Production companies: Wendy Williams Productions; m2 Pictures

Original release
- Network: Investigation Discovery
- Release: September 4 – October 9, 2015

Death by Gossip with Wendy Williams is an American documentary television series on Investigation Discovery which aired in 2015. Announced in March 2015, the series features crime stories which are initiated by gossip and subsequently became motive for unfaithfulness or even murder. The documentary series is presented by talk show host Wendy Williams.

"Everyone loves a little dish now and then, but in these cases, guilty pleasure can become motive for murder," said Williams, who also acts as an executive producer. "I’m an ID Addict and I dare anyone not to be intrigued by the real-life stories we tell every week," she also added.

== Episodes ==
No.	Title	Original release date	U.S. viewers (millions)
1	"Killer Education"	September 4, 2015	0.84
Teacher Susan Reinert's body is discovered in the back of her car. Her ex-husband becomes the main suspect; as the investigation goes further, more interesting details are revealed.
2	"Thrill Kill"	September 11, 2015	0.84
When Colleen Slemmer is found stabbed to death outise Knoxville, Tennessee, police must determine who did it.
3	"Her Last Christmas"	September 18, 2015	0.82
When young mother Lillian Jarvis is killed by a mail bomb, the community of Jacksonville, Florida, is shakened.
4	"Mother's Day Murder"	September 25, 2015	0.90
Residents of Ossining, New York are shocked when beloved teacher Patricia Mery is found stabbed to death in her own home.
5	"Sins and Saddles"	October 2, 2015	0.60
When Randy Flynn is gunned down near his home in Junction City, Kansas, investigators hit a wall of whispers about who pulled the trigger.
6	"Last Goodbye"	October 9, 2015	0.67
After Michael Chalkley was found stuffed in a sleeping bag near the shores of Berkeley, California, rumors swirled around envy and betrayal.
