= WVIS =

Vieques, Puerto Rico (Note: Originally licensed to Frederiksted, U.S. Virgin Islands; moved to Puerto Rico in 2007.); Puerto Rico
- Frequency: 106.1 MHz
- Branding: Radio Joe

Programming
- Format: Contemporary hit radio

Ownership
- Owner: V.I. Stereo Communications Corporation (P.R.)

History
- First air date: June 10, 1973; 52 years ago
- Call sign meaning: Virgin Islands Stereo (station was originally licensed to the U.S. Virgin Islands)

Technical information
- Licensing authority: FCC
- Facility ID: 69631
- Class: B
- ERP: 50,000 watts STA: 375 watts
- HAAT: 170.0 meters STA: -80.8 meters
- Transmitter coordinates: 18°19′37″N 65°18′21″W; STA: 18°22′43.9″N 65°44′42.6″W

Links
- Public license information: Public file; LMS

WVIS (106.1 FM), branded on-air as Radio Joe, is a radio station licensed to serve Vieques, Puerto Rico. The station is owned by V.I. Stereo Communications Corporation (P.R.).

== History ==
=== In the Virgin Islands ===
Isaac J. Bahr and George M. Arroyo applied to the Federal Communications Commission for a construction permit to build a new radio station at 106.1 MHz at Frederiksted on St. Croix in the United States Virgin Islands; the application was approved on November 12, 1971. The station began broadcasting June 10, 1973; it was the first radio station in Frederiksted, and the third FM in the Virgin Islands after outlets at Christiansted and Charlotte Amalie. Bahr became the sole licensee in 1976. The city of license was changed from Frederiksted to Christiansted in 1982. Bahr also filed to establish a television station on channel 27, but lost out to another applicant who was preferred on media diversity grounds.

The station was an urban contemporary outlet, competing with a number of similar stations; this meant that the station struggled to hold an audience, and further, national advertising accounts showed little interest in the Virgin Islands. One on-air personality at the station was a young Wendy Williams, who started her media career as a DJ at WVIS; in a 2003 memoir, Williams described the station as "disorganized" and would return to the mainland eight months later after seeing an ad in Radio & Records magazine for a new station starting up in New York, WQHT (103.5 FM).

WVIS lost its tower when Hurricane Hugo devastated the Virgin Islands in 1989.

=== Move to Puerto Rico ===
In 1995, WVIS was approved to move its city of license and transmitter from the Virgin Islands to Vieques in Puerto Rico, as part of a larger shift of allocations. The move would not come for years and almost did not happen. In August 2002, the FCC declared that WVIS, having been silent more than 12 months, had lost its license under the provisions of Section 312(g) of the Communications Act of 1934; the company sought review, asking the FCC to use discretion granted to it by a 2004 law change, as the facility had been operating intermittently at Christiansted due to damage from four hurricanes, one of which destroyed the station's tower.

As a result of the intervening circumstances, and particularly the damage from hurricanes, the FCC in 2006 reinstated the deleted WVIS license on the condition that it file various applications that would have been necessary in the period—one of them to reflect owner Bahr's 2004 death. The station returned to the air in December 2007; it fully relaunched as Radio Joe on June 28, 2008, with the Radio Joe name in honor of the late Joseph Bahr. It then spent six months off the air after a September 2008 storm caused a power surge, damaging the antenna.

WVIS lost electrical service to its transmitter site on Culebra in 2014 when the Autoridad de Energía Eléctrica, the Puerto Rico electrical utility, shut off power to co-sited station WJVP, which owned the tower, for nonpayment; as a result, the station applied for and received special temporary authority to operate a low-power transmitter at the studios, located on the main island of Puerto Rico at Luquillo. The Culebra tower was blown down in Hurricane Maria three years later, and in the most recent extension filed in June 2020, V.I. Stereo noted that the hurricane and subsequent earthquakes had created an economic disaster that stalled attempts to locate a new site.
