= Book TV =

American television program series

- Genre: News and public affairs
- Created by: Brian Lamb
- Country of origin: United States
- Original language: English

Production
- Running time: 24 hours
- Production company: C-SPAN

Original release
- Release: September 1998 – present

Book TV is the name given to weekend programming on the American cable network C-SPAN2, which airs from 8 a.m. Eastern Time Sunday morning to 8 a.m. Eastern Time Monday morning each week. The 24-hour block of programming is focused on non-fiction books and authors, featuring programs in the format of interviews with authors as well as live coverage of book events from around the country. Book TV debuted on C-SPAN2 on September 12, 1998.

While the primary mission of C-SPAN2 is live coverage of the United States Senate, Book TV programs are sometimes also scheduled to air during the week when the Senate is not in session.

== Background and production ==
Book TV covers established and upcoming nonfiction authors, mainly in the subject areas of history, biography and public affairs. Approximately 2,000 authors are featured annually, and in one year Book TV may cover as many as 60,000 titles. The network's production budget for Book TV is approximately $600,000 per year.

Like C-SPAN's weekly coverage of government affairs, the Book TV the production style is "no frills", focusing on panel discussions, book signings and visits to bookstores. Book TV's coverage is weighted toward government, politics and history, in line with C-SPAN's weekly programming. However, the topics represented vary, ranging from the genealogy of Greek mythology to the “use and abuse” of the English language. While C-SPAN does not usually cover narrative fiction due to its nonfiction mission, it may occasionally be featured, as when Robert MacNeil and Jim Lehrer appeared in 1999 to talk about their novels.

Book TV interviews are characterized by a focus on the author, rather than the host, and an unstructured format allowing the author to guide the discussion. As with other C-SPAN programming, viewer call-ins are featured, allowing writers to hear directly from their readers.

== Programming ==
The majority of the Book TV weekly lineup is coverage of author lectures, book signings, and seminars. Several weekends each year, Book TV features live coverage of major regional book fairs and festivals. There are also several regularly scheduled series: After Words, an interview show conducted by guest hosts familiar with the author's subject; and Booknotes programs from 1989 to 2004, under the title Encore Booknotes.

A monthly series on Book TV is In Depth, a two-hour one-on-one interview covering an author's entire body of work. In Depth is televised live with viewer calls on the first Sunday of each month at 12 p.m. In Depth occasionally also includes video of the featured writer at their home or office, where they talk about how they do their research and writing.

In addition to C-SPAN2, Book TV can also be viewed via live streaming on the C-SPAN website, while an iPhone app streams the audio portion only. All past Book TV coverage of nonfiction authors is archived at the C-SPAN Video Library.

== History ==
The Book TV weekend-long programming schedule grew out of the success of C-SPAN's long-running Booknotes series, which since 1989 was the only avenue for coverage of nonfiction books and authors on the C-SPAN networks. C-SPAN believes that coverage of nonfiction books complements its primary public affairs mission and since Booknotes could only feature 52 books per year, when the network wished to increase its coverage of nonfiction books, Book TV on C-SPAN2 was the solution.

The inspiration for coverage of nonfiction books on the C-SPAN networks originated with C-SPAN founder Brian Lamb's frustration with the lack of attention that authors receive on television, which led initially to the creation of the author interview program Booknotes. As Lamb related in a 2003 interview, "It used to drive me absolutely crazy when an author would appear on a talk show and come and go before I even had a chance to determine if I wanted to read the book."

In 2010, Book TV received the Phillis Wheatley Award from the organizers of New York's Harlem Book Fair. The award, named for the first published African-American female writer, is given for literary work and advocacy that "transcends boundaries, race and perception". According to book fair founder Max Rodriguez, Book TV was honored for giving a voice to African-American literature in a manner unlike other television media outlets.
