= Dirty Jokes and Beer =

1997 book by Drew Carey

Dirty Jokes and Beer: Stories of the Unrefined
- Author: Drew Carey
- Language: English
- Genre: Humor/Fiction
- Publisher: Hyperion
- Publication date: 1997
- Publication place: United States
- Media type: Hardcover, paperback
- Pages: 237 p. (hardcover edition)
- ISBN: 0-7868-6351-X
- OCLC: 37629459
- Dewey Decimal: 792.7/028/092 B 21
- LC Class: PN2287.C264 A3 1997

Dirty Jokes and Beer: Stories of the Unrefined is a 1997 book written by American comedian Drew Carey.

In a preface to the book, Carey states that he wrote every word of it himself—he did not recruit a ghost writer although, as he says, "It probably would have been easier."

== Sections ==
The book is divided into three sections, which are referred to in the title. All of the chapters within the first two sections (save for 101 Big-Dick Jokes, which "would be redundant") are preceded by a dirty joke Carey has heard over the years.

=== The "Dirty Jokes" section ===
The first section deals with Drew's views on various topics, such as being at airports (he writes that he likes to ride around in the carts to make people move out of his way) and the difference between Las Vegas and Atlantic City. (Carey writes that he prefers Las Vegas, as he sees Atlantic City as being filled with retired people shuffling around, playing nickel slot machines.) The section ends with 101 Big Dick Jokes.

=== The "Beer" section ===
This section of the book contains the autobiographical stories. Drew briefly discusses his upbringing and his time with the United States Marines, as well as his experiences working on his show. In this section, he also includes reviews about his show, both positive and negative, as well as some of the notes he received from network censors about the show's content.

=== "The Stories of the Unrefined" ===
This section contains five short stories that Drew wrote for the book. He describes these stories as being "Drew in The Twilight Zone," where he takes some elements from his life and changes them into fictional stories where he is the main protagonist of the stories. These short stories are not preceded by dirty jokes. The very first story "Mi Plea" was a completely true story, except for the ending. And the stories about his friend Larry and girlfriend Natalie were completely fabricated. As was his story about himself in Las Vegas.

== Reception ==
Stephen Thompson of The A.V. Club described the book as "messy, occasionally controversial, and a lot of fun to read". The book was given a C+ from Entertainment Weekly.
