= The Wendy Williams Show =

American syndicated talk show (2008–2022)

- Also known as: The Wendy Show; Wendy
- Genre: Talk show
- Created by: Wendy Williams
- Presented by: Wendy Williams; Guest hosts
- Theme music composer: David Vanacore
- Opening theme: "Shout It Out" by Nikko Lowe (seasons 1–4); "Shout It Out" (Dance Remix) by Nikko Lowe (seasons 5–9); "Feel It" (Shout It Out Remix) by Fergie (seasons 10–13)
- Ending theme: "Shout It Out" by Nikko Lowe (seasons 1–4); "Shout It Out" (Dance Remix) by Nikko Lowe (seasons 5–9); "Feel It" (Shout It Out Remix) by Fergie (seasons 10–13)
- Country of origin: United States
- Original language: English
- No. of seasons: 13
- No. of episodes: 1500+

Production
- Executive producers: Rob Dauber (seasons 1–2); David Perler (seasons 3–13); Wendy Williams-Hunter; Kevin Hunter; Suzanne Bass; Joelle Dawson-Calia
- Production locations: Chelsea Studios, New York City
- Camera setup: Multi-camera
- Running time: 43 minutes
- Production companies: Talk WW Productions, Inc. (seasons 2–13); Wendy Williams Productions (seasons 5–11); Just Wendy (seasons 11–13); Perler Productions (seasons 7–13); Debmar-Mercury (with ad-sales by 20th Television (seasons 3–10))

Original release
- Network: Syndication
- Release: July 14, 2008 – June 17, 2022

The Wendy Williams Show (often shortened to Wendy) is an American syndicated talk show created and hosted by Wendy Williams, and produced by Wendy Williams Productions, along with Perler Productions. The show was distributed by Debmar-Mercury and aired nationally, with Fox's owned-and-operated stations serving as its primary affiliate base. The talk show first aired on July 14, 2008, in select major American markets and later expanded nationwide on July 13, 2009, due to loyal viewership which proved highly profitable. It aired its final episode on June 17, 2022, with reruns continuing on most TV stations until September 9, 2022.

Wendy was broadcast live in front of a studio audience at Chelsea Studios in New York City on Mondays through Thursdays. The Friday shows were either a first-run episode originally taped after the Thursday for broadcast the next day, or a repeat of a previous episode. The show regularly competed with The Ellen DeGeneres Show as the top-ranked syndicated talk show and averaged more than 1.6 million viewers per day including 440,000 in the target demo of women 25–54.

In 2021, Williams took an indefinite leave of absence from the show due to various medical issues, with the show regularly hosted by a variety of guest hosts since the beginning of its 13th season in October 2021 (which itself was delayed from September due to a COVID-19 infection). In February 2022, Debmar-Mercury announced that Sherri Shepherd would host a successor to The Wendy Williams Show, Sherri, beginning in the 2022–2023 season.

== Format ==
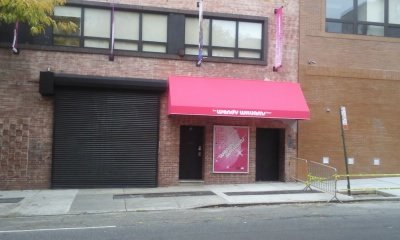
The show's former studio on 53rd Street in Manhattan, used until season 3 of the show.

The program is formatted as an entertainment-based talk show, focusing largely on celebrity news and gossip as well as lifestyle features.

Each episode begins with "Hot Topics", an opening segment — usually running 18 to 21 minutes (originally lasting 10 to 12 minutes until the third season), depending on the number of stories featured — in which Williams mainly discusses tabloid headlines and celebrity news, provides her opinions, often addressing the celebrities directly and giving them advice to the camera. Williams also shares other stories about her life. The segment incorporates a heavier emphasis on stories about reality stars and African-American entertainers (particularly hip-hop, rap and R&B artists) than are covered on traditional entertainment newsmagazine programs. Occasionally, the topics incorporated into the segment may involve current issues and offbeat news items not related to the entertainment industry; Williams periodically deviates from the topic to elaborate on a particular aspect of it that relates to her own life. The studio audience (who are affectionately termed by Williams as her "co-hosts") have some active participation in the segment, with Williams often surveying them through applause about a particular point of the story being discussed.

Periodic segments-within-a-segment are featured during "Hot Topics" including "Wendy's Got You Covered" (detailing cover stories from current issues of entertainment, fashion and lifestyle magazines), the "Hot Shot of the Day" (showcasing a particular celebrity photo), the "Clip of the Day" (usually featuring clips or promos from upcoming television programs) and "Celebrity Shout-Out" (detailing a celebrity-related story highlighting a particular milestone or accomplishment).

In addition to "Hot Topics", the program included other in-depth topical segments incorporating guest contributors including the:

- "Inside Scoop" (regularly featuring during the Monday show), featuring a contributor who rotates each week (most of whom are correspondents/hosts of entertainment-related newsmagazine programs or magazines) providing detailed analysis of a selection of celebrity-related stories.
- "Hot Talk Panel" (regularly featured during the Thursday or Friday editions) in which Williams and a panel of four journalists discuss news items and current issues ranging from social and political issues to tabloid headlines;
- "What's Trending Now", an occasional segment that showcases viral videos, and details the latest fashion and beauty trends and offbeat stories trending on social media; and
- After award shows, Williams will have a "Fashion Squad" panel to discuss the fashion at the award show's red carpet.

On the Tuesday, Wednesday, and Thursday editions, Williams interviews a single featured celebrity guest; musical performances are featured occasionally. On Mondays, the show regularly features product giveaways, usually as part of "Trendy@Wendy", a weekly segment showcasing fashion/beauty products and electronics that are given to studio audience members, with at-home viewers being able to purchase the featured items through the show's website at a discount from their estimated retail price.

The remainder of the program heavily incorporates feature segments (many of which are featured in the show's "B"-block) including:

- "Ask Wendy", a segment in which Williams gives audience members advice on how to deal with their work, family or relationship problems
- "Celebrity Fan-Out", featuring photographs submitted by viewers of their celebrity encounters
- "Celebrity Lookalikes", featuring photographs of viewers stating their resemblance to a particular celebrity, with Williams and the studio audience judging the closeness in their resemblance
- "Hot Topics Sound-Off" in which up to four audience members give their opinion to Williams about the stories discussed in "Hot Topics" or other topical segments mentioned in that day's episode
- "Street Talk" (a man-on-the-street segment in which viewers in public areas in U.S. cities provide their opinions of hypothetical celebrity-related questions, with humorous cutout animations added).

== Series history ==
=== Early years (2008–16) ===
On April 21, 2008, Fox Television Stations ordered a test run of the show for the group's Fox owned-and-operated stations to air after their local weekday morning newscasts. The Wendy Williams Show premiered on July 14, 2008, as a six-week trial run on four Fox-owned outlets: WNYW/New York City, KTTV/Los Angeles, WJBK/Detroit and KDFW/Dallas-Fort Worth.

After the test run concluded, Debmar-Mercury picked up the program for a full nationwide launch, and through additional station group pickups (including stations owned by CBS Television Stations, NBC Owned Television Stations, Tribune Broadcasting, LIN TV Corporation, Cox Media Group, Local TV LLC, Raycom Media, New Vision Television and the Meredith Corporation), gained carriage on stations covering more than 95% of the country including all of the 20 largest media markets and 45 of the top 50 markets.

On June 4, 2009, BET acquired the cable syndication rights to the show, airing it as part of the cable channel's late night schedule. The Wendy Williams Show entered into national syndication on broadcast stations and on BET from July 13, 2009. The show debuted outside the United States on BET International in July 2010 in Africa and the United Kingdom.

The Wendy Williams Show went on a 17-city "Say It Like You Mean It" promotional tour across the United States in the summer of 2011, presenting mini-versions of the show at local malls. On May 4, 2013, Fox Television Stations announced a deal with Debmar-Mercury to renew the show through the 2016–17 television season.

=== Health struggles (2017–19) ===
On October 31, 2017, Williams, dressed in a Statue of Liberty costume on the Halloween episode, unexpectedly fainted during the live telecast when she was about to announce the winners of the show's Halloween contest. The episode then went into an extended commercial break. Williams resumed stating, "That was not a stunt. I overheated and did pass out, but I'm a champ and I'm back." Williams and her spokesperson cited heat exhaustion from her costume as the cause.

In February 2018, Williams canceled three shows due to illness. On February 21, Williams announced that she was taking a three-week hiatus, due to health issues. In March, actor Jerry O'Connell served as guest host for a week during her absence, despite Williams insisting in previous years her show would never utilize a guest host. Williams returned on March 19, 2018. That summer, Williams went on a 10-city tour to celebrate the tenth season of the show.

Following further speculation on her health in late 2018, Williams went on an indefinite hiatus in January and February 2019 after a shoulder injury and worsening complications from Graves' disease and other personal issues. This time around, several guest hosts such as Jerry O'Connell, Nick Cannon, Keke Palmer, Michael Rapaport, Sherri Shepherd, and Jason Biggs filled the slot until Williams returned on March 4, 2019. Williams noted on the March 19 episode of her show that she had also begun treatment for a decades-old cocaine addiction and was living in a sober house when not hosting her show. In April 2019, Debmar-Mercury began distributing with CBS Television Studios, following 20th Century Fox being bought by Disney. On September 16, 2019, Williams announced on the eleventh-season premiere that the series had been renewed through 2022, bringing the series to its thirteenth season.

=== Final years (2020–22) ===
In March 2020, production on the series was halted due to the COVID-19 pandemic. From April to May 2020, the series returned virtually as "Wendy @ Home", with Williams filming the Hot Topics segment from her apartment and a short virtual interview. In July, it was announced that the show would return live for its twelfth season on September 21, 2020, with show staffers as studio audience members wearing masks and physically distancing. In June 2021, the show began using studio audience members again for the final six weeks of the season. Her final episode of her show was July 16, 2021.

The September 20, 2021 premiere of the thirteenth and final season of The Wendy Williams Show was delayed by several weeks due to Williams contracting a breakthrough case of COVID-19 and ongoing complications from her Graves' disease and thyroid condition. It was later announced that the season would premiere on October 18, 2021, with guest hosts such as Leah Remini, Michelle Visage, Whitney Cummings, Michelle Buteau, Sherri Shepherd, Michael Rapaport, Kym Whitley, Finesse Mitchell, Jerry Springer, Steve Wilkos, Remy Ma, Fat Joe, Michael Yo, Devyn Simone, Bevy Smith, Terrence J, Carson Kressley, Vivica A. Fox, Bill Bellamy, and other panelists filling in for Williams until she was able to return to the show. On February 8, 2022, it was reported that Williams would miss the remainder of the season, and that Shepherd—whom Williams had endorsed as an interim host—had entered talks to potentially host a replacement program should Williams be unable to return.

On February 22, 2022, Debmar-Mercury announced that The Wendy Williams Show would be replaced in the 2022–23 television season by the Sherri Shepherd-hosted Sherri, with Fox Television Stations signing on to remain its core affiliate group. The show will retain its showrunner, executive producer, and segments such as "Hot Topics". Debmar-Mercury stated that "we believe it is best for our fans, stations and advertising partners to start making this transition now", and that "we hope to be able to work with Wendy again in the future, and continue to wish her a speedy and full recovery." The final episode aired on June 17, with Williams unable to appear. The show's YouTube channel and all the other social media accounts were deleted and related website domains were relinquished by early July. The show itself continued in reruns until September 9, 2022, with Sherri debuting three days later on September 12.

== Controversies ==
=== Beyoncé ===
Although Williams has stated her support for Beyoncé several times, she has made several comments that have upset the singer's fan group "The Beyhive". In 2012, while discussing Beyoncé's HBO docufilm Life Is But a Dream, Williams stated she "needs subtitles" for the film because Beyoncé "talks like she has a fifth-grade education". Williams has also made comments several times stating Beyoncé "needs autotune" and is not a contemporary music icon.

=== "Galentine's Day" comments ===
On February 13, 2020, Williams was accused of homophobia and transphobia during a segment discussing the unofficial Galentine's Day holiday, where she told gay men to "stop wearing our skirts and heels" and that one must menstruate "to be a woman." Williams tearfully apologized for the comments in a video posted to social media, and again on her show.

=== Death of Amie Harwick ===
On February 17, 2020, Williams made a joke about Amie Harwick, a Hollywood sex therapist who had died on February 15, 2020, after injuries sustained from being pushed off a three-story balcony. In reference to Harwick's former engagement to The Price Is Right host Drew Carey, Williams joked using the show's catchphrase, "Come on down!" and looked down, pretending to watch someone fall to the ground. The joke was met with heavy backlash, with many criticizing her for being insensitive and mocking Harwick's death.

=== Ellen DeGeneres ===
In a May 2021 segment discussing Ellen DeGeneres announcing her talk show would be ending the following year, Williams stated she believed that DeGeneres was actually leaving due to negative publicity surrounding a July 2020 investigation into allegations of the series' work environment; the investigation ultimately led to WarnerMedia firing three executive producers of the show. Williams commented "nineteen years on TV doesn't change your life, it exposes you for the person you really are," and revealed that, during an appearance on her show years earlier, she "wasn't happy [as a guest]." Several commentators found Williams' comments "shady" and disrespectful.

=== Britney Spears ===
In a June 2021 "Inside Scoop" segment, Williams discussed testimony from Britney Spears regarding her conservatorship in which Spears described the conservatorship as "abusive" and spoke of trauma inflicted from her father Jamie Spears. Williams – who had been a supporter of both Spears' father and the conservatorship in general – said in response to Spears' testimony:

"How dare you, Mr. Spears, you had me fooled. And you too, Mrs. Spears. Death to all of them."

Her comments were met with shocked and disturbed reactions from her audience and staff, and Williams herself. Several outlets criticized Williams for the comments. The "Death to all of them" portion was edited out from online clips and later airings of the episode.

== Awards and nominations ==
The show has been nominated for eleven Daytime Emmy Awards, winning one Creative Arts Emmy Award for Outstanding Hairstyling in 2011.

Year	Nominee / work	Award	Result
2010	Hadiiya Barbel & D'Angelo Thompson	Outstanding Hairstyling	Nominated
2011	Antwon Jackson, Hadiiya Barbel & D'Angelo Thompson	Outstanding Hairstyling	Won
2011	Marilyn Rennagel	Outstanding Lighting Direction	Nominated
2011	Merrell Hollis & D'Angelo Thompson	Outstanding Makeup	Nominated
2012	Antwon Jackson & Jai Williams	Outstanding Hairstyling	Nominated
2015	The Wendy Williams Show	Outstanding Talk Show Entertainment	Nominated
2015	Wendy Williams	Outstanding Entertainment Talk Show Host	Nominated
2016	The Wendy Williams Show	Outstanding Talk Show Entertainment	Nominated
2016	Wendy Williams	Outstanding Entertainment Talk Show Host	Nominated
2017	Wendy Williams	Outstanding Entertainment Talk Show Host	Nominated
2019	Wendy Williams	Outstanding Entertainment Talk Show Host	Nominated
2021	The Wendy Williams Show	Outstanding Hairstyling	Nominated
2021	The Wendy Williams Show	Outstanding Makeup	Nominated

=== People's Choice Awards ===
Year	Nominee / work	Award	Result
2016	Wendy Williams	Favorite Daytime TV Host	Nominated
2019	The Wendy Williams Show	The Daytime Talk Show of 2019	Nominated
2020	The Wendy Williams Show	The Daytime Talk Show of 2020	Nominated
2021	The Wendy Williams Show	The Daytime Talk Show of 2021	Nominated
