= Wendy Williams: What a Mess! =

Television documentary about Wendy Williams

- Promotional poster
- Country of origin: United States
- Original language: English

Production
- Executive producers: Wendy Williams; Tara Long; Mark Ford; Kevin Lopez; Sarah Girgis; Joie Jacoby; Brie Bryant; Gena McCarthy
- Production companies: Entertainment One; Creature Films

Original release
- Release: January 30, 2021

Wendy Williams: What a Mess! is a 2021 American television documentary about the life of Wendy Williams. It was released on Lifetime on January 30, 2021.

== Production ==
In July 2019, it was announced Lifetime had ordered a documentary film revolving around the life of Wendy Williams, with Williams set to star and executive produce, and with Entertainment One and Creature Films set to produce. Tara Long, Mark Ford, Kevin Lopez, Sarah Girgis, Joie Jacoby, Brie Bryant and Gena McCarthy also served as executive producers. Williams and executives at Lifetime went through a list of names to be interviewed in the film, and if selected, Williams would contact them and tell them not to hold back. No topics were off limits to be included in the film.
