= Marylawn of the Oranges Academy =

Defunct Catholic school in Essex County, New Jersey, US

Location
- 445 Scotland Road; South Orange, Essex County, New Jersey 07079; United States
- 40°45′14″N 74°15′5″W

Information
- Type: Private, Coeducational
- Religious affiliations: Roman Catholic, Sisters of Charity of Saint Elizabeth
- Established: 1935
- Closed: June 2013
- Dean: Peter Ruckdeschel
- Faculty: 21.9 (on FTE basis)
- Grades: 6–12
- Enrollment: 160 (2009-10)
- Average class size: 15
- Student to teacher ratio: 7.3:1
- Colors: Blue and white
- Song: Hail Alma Mater
- Athletics conference: Super Essex Conference
- Mascot: Knight
- Team name: Lady Knights
- Accreditation: Middle States Association of Colleges and Schools
- Yearbook: Madonna
- Tuition: 6th-8th: $5,500 9-12th: $8,300
- Website: www.marylawn.us

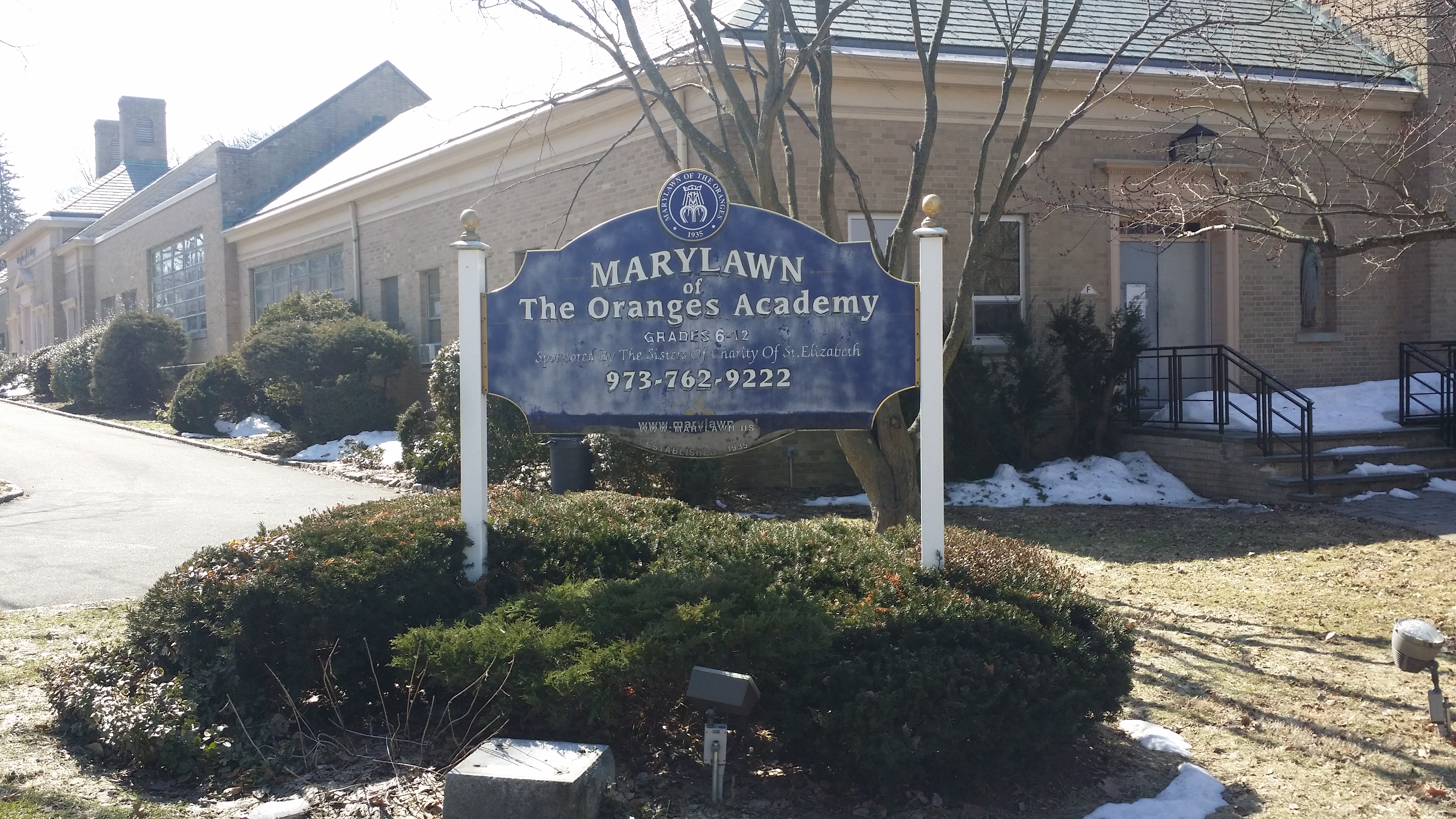
Marylawn of Oranges Academy

Marylawn of the Oranges Academy, also known as Marylawn of the Oranges High School, was an all-girl, private, Roman Catholic college-preparatory high school for grades 7 through 12 located in South Orange, in Essex County, in the U.S. state of New Jersey. Sponsored by the Sisters of Charity of Saint Elizabeth since its founding in 1935, Marylawn was located within the Roman Catholic Archdiocese of Newark. The school had been accredited by the Middle States Association of Colleges and Schools Commission on Elementary and Secondary Schools since 1962.

For the ten years before the school closed, Marylawn had a 100% graduation and 100% college acceptance rate.

As of the 2009–10 school year, the school had an enrollment of 160 students and 21.9 classroom teachers (on an FTE basis), for a Student–teacher ratio of 7.3:1.

In October 2012, it was announced that the school would close in June 2013.

Since March 2018, the former site of the high school has been the home of the STEM Innovation Academy, a joint effort of Montclair State University, the New Jersey Institute of Technology, the Orange Board of Education and Orange, New Jersey.

== Athletics ==
The Marylawn of the Oranges High School Lady Knights competed in the Super Essex Conference, which comprises public and private high schools in Essex County and was established following a reorganization of sports leagues in Northern New Jersey by the New Jersey State Interscholastic Athletic Association.

The 1985 tennis team won the Non-Public B state championship, defeating runner-up Mater Dei High School 3–2 in the finals.

== Mission ==
The mission of Marylawn of the Oranges Academy was to prepare, motivate, and challenge young women, intellectually and morally, to assume their roles in society according to Catholic tradition and in the founding spirit of the Sisters of Charity of New Jersey.

== Notable alumni ==
- Karen Hunter (born 1966), journalist, publisher, talk show host and the co-author of several books.
