= Love Triangle (game show) =

- Presented by: Wendy Williams
- Music by: Jeff Lippencott; Mark T. Williams
- No. of seasons: 1
- No. of episodes: 32

Production
- Executive producers: Todd A. Nelson; Brant Pinvidic; JD Roth; Wendy Williams; Kevin Hunter
- Producer: Courtney Phelps
- Running time: 22–26 minutes
- Production company: 3 Ball Productions

Original release
- Network: GSN
- Release: April 11 – August 28, 2011

Love Triangle is an American dating themed game show–talk show crossover broadcast by Game Show Network. Hosted by Wendy Williams, the show premiered on April 11, 2011, and aired its final episode on August 28, 2011.

The series focuses on a single dater who is involved in a romantic relationship with two different people. Through a series of personality and lie-detector tests, the dater observes the level of compatibility between themself and each of the suitors before eliminating one of the suitors at the end of the episode.

== Format ==
Love Triangle features civilians caught in a real-life "love triangle", featuring a dater and two suitors, with the suitors often having vastly different lifestyles and personalities. The episode begins by discussing secrets of each of the suitors' past. The suitors then take a personality test to see how compatible they are with the dater, especially in the subjects of lifestyle, money, and sex. The dater then asks the suitors questions which they must answer while hooked up to a lie detector, nicknamed the "Trustbuster". The dater is shown what the future will hold with each of the suitors, including their financial situation and what their child might look like, before deciding whom to keep and whom to let go. The dater and the suitor who was chosen win a vacation as a grand prize.

== Production ==
Kelly Goode, former Senior Vice President of Programming for GSN, cited the success of the network's other dating and relationship shows Baggage and The Newlywed Game as promising signs for Love Triangle to succeed. On January 20, 2011, GSN green-lit Love Triangle and announced Williams as host of the show the same day. The show taped in Los Angeles with Williams also serving as an executive producer along with her husband, Kevin Hunter. The show premiered on April 11, 2011, along with Drew Carey's Improv-A-Ganza. Neither show, however, was renewed for a second season. Love Triangle aired its final episode on August 28, 2011.

== Reruns ==
Reruns of Love Triangle currently air on LifeStyle You in Australia.

GSN aired reruns at various times until January 10, 2015, when it was replaced on the schedule by Deal or No Deal.
