= Karen Hunter =

American journalist

Karen Hunter (born April 24, 1966) is an American journalist, talk show host, publisher, and the co-author of several non-fiction books. She is the host of The Karen Hunter Show on SiriusXM Urban View.

== Early life and education ==
Born and raised in East Orange, New Jersey, Hunter graduated from Marylawn of the Oranges High School in 1983 and received a B.A. in English literature from Drew University in 1987.

== Career ==
Between 1996 and 1998, Hunter taught journalism at New York University.

Hunter served for four years on the seven-member editorial board of the New York Daily News. In 1999, she was a concurrent member of respective news teams that won the Pulitzer Prize and the Polk Award. Prior to that she was the paper's first African-American female news columnists; she joined the newspaper as a sports writer in 1988, then wrote features and business stories.

In January 2002, Hunter was appointed by the Hunter College administration as an Assistant Visiting Professor in the Department of Film and Media Studies and presently is a Distinguished Lecturer at Hunter College. She also was a morning radio talk show host for three years in New York City.

=== Radio career ===
In 2006, Hunter left her position as a morning talk show host on New York station (1600 AM) WWRL. Her departure followed the dissolution of an early morning team composed of her and WABC personality Steve Malzberg.

In 2007, she launched Karen Hunter Publishing, an imprint of Pocket Books/Simon & Schuster. She has published Why Black Men Love White Women, Faith Under Fire, Love On A Two-Way Street, Recipes for a Good Life with Patti LaBelle, and The Children of Children Keep Coming: An Epic Griotsong with Wall Street pioneer Russell L. Goings. As a writer, Hunter has co-authored five New York Times bestsellers, among them books with Queen Latifah, Al Sharpton, Mason Betha, Karrine Steffans, LL Cool J, Wendy Williams, J. L. King, Donda West, Sandy Denton, Cedric the Entertainer, and Jonathan Plummer.

On January 31, 2007, Hunter appeared on CNN's Paula Zahn Now in a piece on atheists in America. During the open forum portion she suggested: "If they [atheists] had Hallmark Cards, maybe they wouldn't feel so left out. We have Christmas cards. We have Kwanzaa cards now. Maybe they need to get some atheist cards and get that whole ball rolling so more people can get involved with what they're doing. I think they need to shut up and let people do what they do."

On April 11, 2011, on her Facebook page, Hunter called for a boycott of the television show Celebrity Apprentice in reactions to comments Donald Trump made about Barack Obama. She said in a later interview: "So many of us were angered and outraged by Trump’s comments and I wanted to let us know that we have power. We can do something besides grumble and complain."

In 2012, Hunter disparagingly referred on MSNBC to Republican presidential candidate Mitt Romney, remarking: "[M]aybe [Mitt Romney's] not running for the presidency of the United States, maybe he's running for the presidency of 'Caucasia-stan' or some place that doesn't have anyone of color in it."

In 2015, Hunter wrote a petition on MoveOn.org calling for the removal of the Confederate flag from the South Carolina State House following the murder of nine people at a Mother Emmanuel Church in Charleston, South Carolina. Within three days, 500,000 people signed the petition; the second fastest to 500,000 in MoveOn.org's history at the time. Several days later, Governor Nikki Haley announced that the flag would be removed. This announcement was followed by a vote in the South Carolina state legislature to remove the flag.

On an episode of The Karen Hunter Show that aired during the 2016 presidential election cycle, Republican presidential hopeful Ben Carson revealed that he was held up at gunpoint at a Popeyes restaurant in Maryland. Carson told Hunter that he redirected the would-be robber to the cashier saying, "You don't want me, you want him."

== Personal life ==
Hunter resides in South Orange, New Jersey.
