= Amie Harwick =

American therapist and writer (1981–2020)

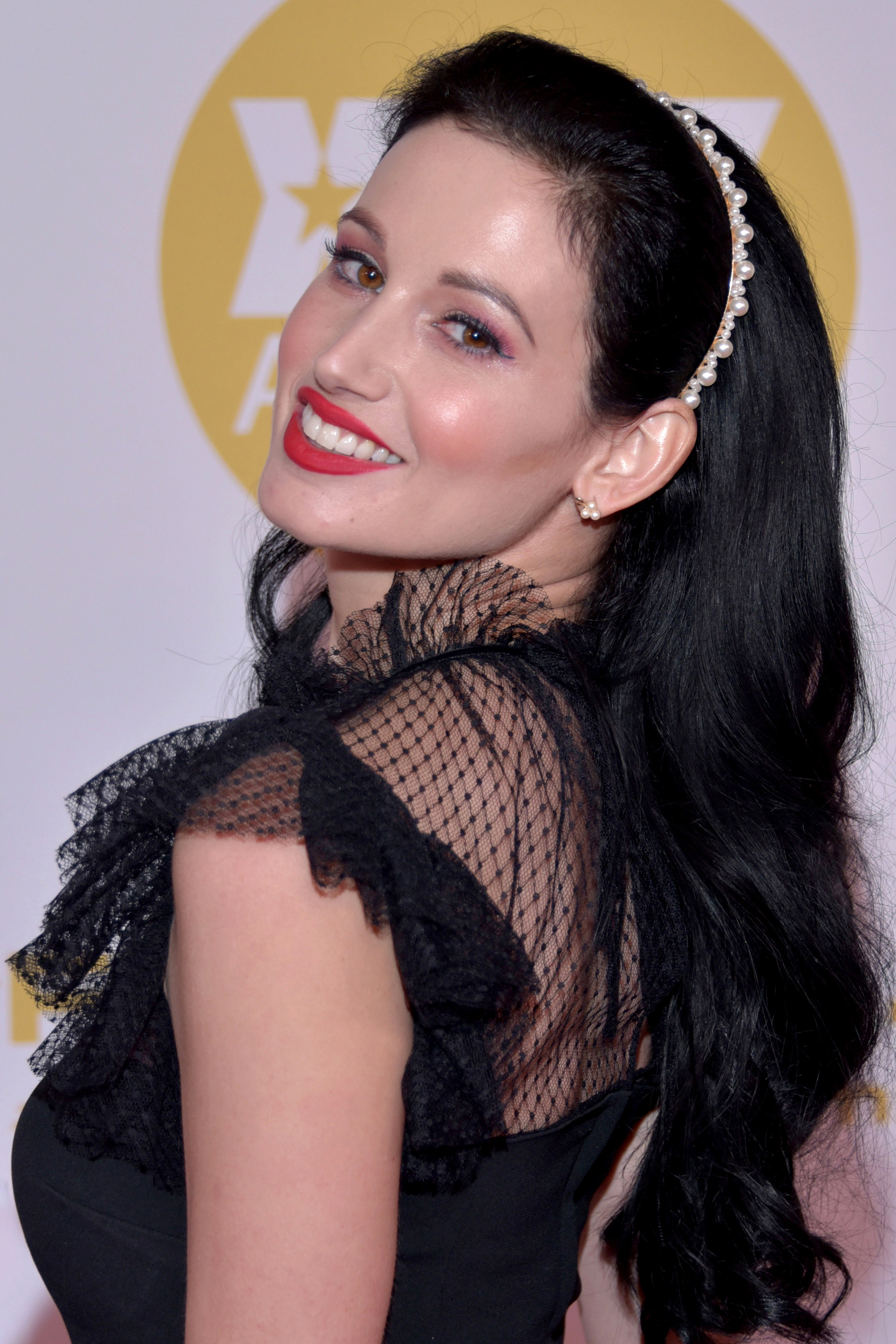
- Harwick in January 2020
- Born: Amie Nicole Harwick; May 20, 1981; Sellersville, Pennsylvania, U.S.
- Died: February 15, 2020 (aged 38); Los Angeles, California, U.S.
- Cause of death: Murder
- Burial place: Whitemarsh Memorial Park, Ambler, Pennsylvania, U.S.
- Other names: Amie Nicole; Nicolette Novak
- Education: California State Polytechnic University (BA); Pepperdine University (MA); Institute for Advanced Study of Human Sexuality (PhD)
- Occupations: Family and sex counselor
- Organization: Pineapple Support
- Notable work: Author of The New Sex Bible for Women (2014); ISBN 1592336418
- Website: Official website

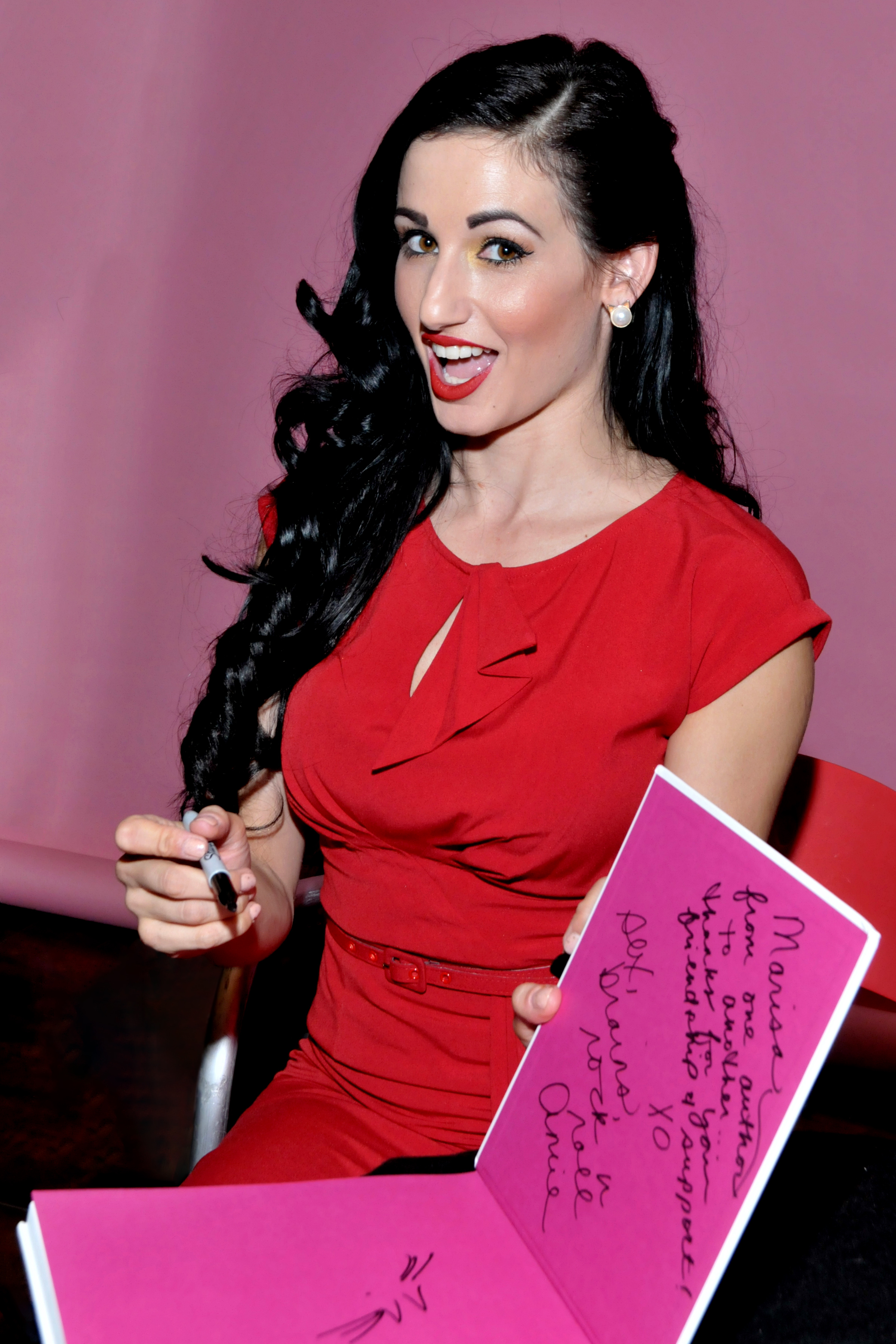
Amie Harwick autographs her book The New Sex Bible for Women in 2014

Amie Nicole Harwick (May 20, 1981 – February 15, 2020) was an American marriage and family therapist and writer.

After working as a model, trainer, dancer and bartender Harwick earned advanced degrees and practiced as a therapist. She specialized in family and sex counseling, and became known for working with clients in West Hollywood. Harwick authored The New Sex Bible for Women: The Complete Guide to Sexual Self-Awareness and Intimacy (2014) and regularly discussed her work on podcasts, TV, and her YouTube channel. In 2018, she was briefly the fiancée of comedian and actor Drew Carey. During her final years, Harwick also worked with Pineapple Support, a nonprofit organization that provides mental health support to members of the adult film industry. Additionally, she served on the board of directors of Rock to Recovery, a nonprofit that treats addiction and mental health issues with music therapy.

When she was 38 years old, Harwick was murdered by an ex-boyfriend at her Hollywood Hills apartment. Her killer was sentenced to life in prison without the possibility of parole.

== Biography ==
Adopted as a child, Harwick grew up in Lansdale, Pennsylvania, graduating from North Penn High School in 1999. After marrying a heavy metal musician, she moved to Los Angeles in 2001, where she worked as a personal trainer under the name Amie Nicole, releasing a workout DVD titled Amie Nicole's Fit to Rock. To help pay for educational expenses, she also worked multiple side jobs, including as a go-go dancer, bartender, and model; she modeled for Playboy under the name Nicolette Novak.

After completing a degree in psychology at California State Polytechnic University, Harwick earned a Master of Arts in clinical psychology from Pepperdine University and received a PhD from the Institute for Advanced Study of Human Sexuality (a non-accredited institution). She became a well-known marriage and family therapist in West Hollywood, where she specialized in family and sex counseling, also appearing regularly on podcasts, TV, and her YouTube channel to discuss her work. In 2014, she published The New Sex Bible for Women: The Complete Guide to Sexual Self-Awareness and Intimacy. In 2015, she was featured in the documentary film Addicted to Sexting.

At a party in the summer of 2017, Harwick met comedian Drew Carey, whom she began dating shortly afterward. They announced their engagement in January 2018 but ended their relationship amicably later that year.

In the final years of her life, Harwick worked with Pineapple Support, a nonprofit organization that provides mental health support in the adult entertainment industry. She also served on the board of directors of Rock to Recovery, a nonprofit organization that treats addiction and mental health issues with music therapy.

== Murder, investigation, and trial ==
On the evening of Valentine's Day 2020, Harwick attended a burlesque performance, returning to her Hollywood Hills apartment shortly after 1:00 a.m. on February 15. At 1:16 a.m., her roommate placed an emergency call to the Los Angeles Police Department, reporting screaming inside the apartment. The responding officers found Harwick badly injured and unresponsive on the patio beneath her third-floor balcony and she was later pronounced dead at a hospital. An initial investigation found that she had been strangled and thrown from the balcony after a home invasion. Speaking to NBC News following her death, her former fiancé Drew Carey described her as "a positive force in the world and an unapologetic champion of women."

The same day of Harwick's death, police arrested Gareth Pursehouse, a 41-year-old software engineer, photographer, and aspiring comedian on suspicion of her murder. Pursehouse and Harwick had dated for around 18 months in the early 2010s. After she ended the relationship, he reportedly stalked and harassed her, leading her to file multiple applications for restraining orders. A month before her death, Harwick encountered Pursehouse at the XBIZ Awards, an adult entertainment awards ceremony that she was attending on behalf of Pineapple Support. He was working at the event as a photographer. She talked with Pursehouse for around an hour and later told her mother that she had gone into "therapist mode" and tried to calm him down after he accused her of ruining his life. She documented the encounter in an email to herself, noting that "[Pursehouse] was sobbing, his head was in his hands, he was hyperventilating, he was distorting his face up and shaking violently." She also wrote: "It terrifies me that he's been obsessed with me for nine years [and] thinks about me every day." After the encounter, a close friend of Harwick noted that she felt unsafe and began looking into protective measures such as surveillance cameras and pepper spray. She also began sharing her smartphone's location with her friend.

Pursehouse was charged with Harwick's murder, with the special circumstance of lying in wait, breaking and entering, and home burglary. At his trial, which began on August 29, 2023, prosecutors argued that the encounter at the awards ceremony had reignited Pursehouse's obsession with Harwick. They gave evidence Pursehouse had broken into her apartment, waited several hours until she returned, and then punched her, strangled her, and threw her off the third-floor balcony, causing her death by blunt force trauma to the head and torso. He had also brought to her apartment a syringe containing a lethal amount of nicotine, although it had remained unused.

On September 29, 2023, after deliberating for two days, a jury convicted Pursehouse of first-degree murder. On December 6, 2023, he was sentenced to life in prison without possibility of parole. He was also ordered to pay $7,500 in restitution.

== Appearances ==
=== Filmography ===
Year	Title	Role	Notes
2007	The Devil's Muse	Jeannette Bauer	listed Amie Nicole
2016	Noirland	Dr. Anouschka Berman	listed as Amie Nicole

=== Television ===
Year	Title	Role	Notes
2011	Blabber Box	Mechanic's Girlfriend	Episode: "3"
