= Pineapple Support =

Mental health nonprofit in porn industry

Pineapple Support is a nonprofit organization that provides free and low-cost mental health therapy to pornographic film actors, producers and others who work in the adult film industry. It was launched in April 2018 by adult performer Leya Tanit in response to a series of deaths in the adult industry in late 2017 and early 2018 resulting from mental illness or addiction, including that of August Ames. In its first two years, Pineapple Support provided over a thousand members of the adult film industry with mental health support and resources, including free and low-cost therapy, counseling and emotional support.

Pineapple Support brings therapists to the AVN Awards to provide free, walk-in sessions for adult performers. In October 2019, Pineapple Support hosted the first online mental health summit specifically for the adult film industry, featuring sessions with over a dozen therapists. Pineapple Support works with over one hundred therapists worldwide and receives major funding from adult industry sources such as Pornhub, xHamster, Kink.com and Chaturbate. Pineapple Support says it has helped over 5000 performers and online sex workers, through both therapy referrals, active listening, and event partnerships with adult industry leaders, such as a Suicide Prevention Webinar hosted with non-profit advocacy group Free Speech Coalition or a Restorative Yoga Workshop hosted with the cam site XLoveCam(Shoshoro N.V.).

Tanit chose the name "Pineapple" because it is a common safeword in the BDSM community, and she wanted the organization to be "a safeword for performers."
