= QBR The Black Book Review =

Quarterly book review publication based in New York

QBR: The Black Book Review
- Type: Weekly newspaper
- Owner(s): Max Rodriguez
- Founded: 1992; 33 years ago
- Headquarters: 9 West 126th Street; New York, NY 10027, U.S.
- Website: Official website

QBR: The Black Book Review was founded by Max Rodriguez in 1992 to serve as a national source of reviews for books about the African-American and African experience.

QBR began as a quarterly print publication, reviewing books in all genres. It produces the annual Harlem Book Fair, which began in 1998. In 2005, QBR entered into a partnership with Black Issues Book Review, and at the same time, discontinued print publication of its quarterly. QBR continues to be published online monthly, with weekly updates.

QBR sponsors the Celebration of Black Writers in Philadelphia and the African-American Read In in Dallas. They published Sacred Fire: The QBR 100 Essential Black Books in 1999.
