= The Wendy Williams Experience =

2006 American reality television series

- Genre: Reality
- Starring: Wendy Williams
- Country of origin: United States
- Original language: English
- No. of seasons: 1
- No. of episodes: 8

Production
- Executive producers: Kevin Hunter; Michael Hirschorn; Rick Hankey; Shelly Tatro
- Producers: Wendy Williams; Greg Wacks
- Running time: 22 minutes

Original release
- Network: VH1
- Release: October 20 – December 9, 2006

The Wendy Williams Experience is an American reality television series that aired on VH1 from October 20, 2006, to December 9, 2006. It chronicles Wendy Williams as she hosts her radio show on (107.5 WBLS) with Charlamagne as her co-host. On the radio show, Williams spoke about gossip, fashion, celebrity news, and gave advice to callers. She also interviewed celebrities, and is noted for asking outrageous questions.

== Episodes ==
No.	Title	Original release date
1	"Episode 1"	October 20, 2006
Williams interviews Lionel Richie, Ice-T, Coco Austin, and Fonzworth Bentley. Later, Williams gives advice and talks about gossip over the radio.
2	"Episode 2"	October 27, 2006
She interviews Andrew Dice Clay and Ice Cube. Later Williams gives gossip about Oprah Winfrey and Janet Jackson. Then she hits the red carpet at the Tony Awards. After that, she gives advice.
3	"Episode 3"	November 3, 2006
"Weird Al" Yankovic stops by the WBLS studios along with Brooke Hogan and Mike Epps. Williams and Weird Al chat about his song, White and Nerdy. Later, Williams gives gossip and advice to an unknown caller.
4	"Episode 4"	November 10, 2006
Vivica A. Fox is interviewed along with Christopher Knight and Adrianne Curry, his wife. Then, John Legend is interviewed. Advice hour follows.
5	"Episode 5"	November 17, 2006
Williams and John Leguizamo talk about Hollywood. Williams interviews Flavor of Love season winner Deelishis. There follows a surprise stop at the BET Hip-Hop Awards red carpet, followed by advice hour.
6	"Episode 6"	November 24, 2006
The Game and Snoop Dogg and Williams talk about hip hop. Then Williams talks about Hollywood breakups. Advice hour follows.
7	"Episode 7"	December 1, 2006
Tracy Morgan joins Williams and at WBLS. Wood Harris talks about his role on HBO's The Wire. Buckeey shares her experience on Flavor of Love 2, followed by advice hour.
8	"Episode 8"	December 9, 2006
Ciara talks with Williams about her love life and new album, Ciara: The Evolution. Williams interviews Carmen Bryan. After that Young Jeezy stops by. Williams goes to VH1's Big in '06 Awards. Advice hour follows.
