= Harlem Book Fair =

Annual African-American literary event

- Status: Active
- Genre: Multi-genre
- Venue: Schomburg Center for Research in Black Culture
- Locations: Harlem, New York
- Country: United States
- Inaugurated: 1998; 28 years ago
- Attendance: 30,000
- Organizer: QBR - The Black Book Review
- Website: http://www.harlembookfair.com/

The Harlem Book Fair is the United States' largest African-American book fair and the nation’s flagship Black literary event. Held annually in Harlem, New York, the Harlem Book Fair features exhibition booths, panel discussions, book sales, and workshops. Notable authors participating have included Cornel West, Sonia Sanchez, Amiri Baraka, Walter Mosley, Terry McMillan, Touré, Farai Chideya, Stanley Crouch, Nelson George, Mark Anthony Neal.

== History ==
Founded by Max Rodriguez, publisher of QBR The Black Book Review (the first national book review exclusively dedicated to books about the African experience, set up by Rodriguez in 1992), the Harlem Book Fair (HBF) was first held in July 1998 on the plaza of the Adam Clayton Powell Jr. State Office Building on 125th Street. Outgrowing this space, HBF moved to Harlem’s 135th Street, and at its peak covered three city blocks, stretching from 5th Avenue to Frederick Douglass Boulevard. HBF is an indoor and outdoor event, and the Schomburg Center for Research in Black Culture, the Countee Cullen Library, and the Thurgood Marshall Academy have served as venues. C-SPAN's Book TV has broadcast from the Harlem Book Fair since 1999, airing its popular panels.

With its growing popularity, the Harlem Book Fair has been hosted in other cities including Atlanta, Philadelphia, Los Angeles, Boston, Hempstead, Newark, and Buffalo, Caribbean authors have also been promoted at the book fair, with the inclusion of such Caribbean initiatives as the Bocas Lit Fest.

== Phillis Wheatley Award ==
The Harlem Book Fair has given the Phillis Wheatley Awards to black authors including Maya Angelou, Gordon Parks, and Terry McMillan for their body of work.

== See also ==
- Books in the United States
