= Drew Carey =

American comedian (born 1958)

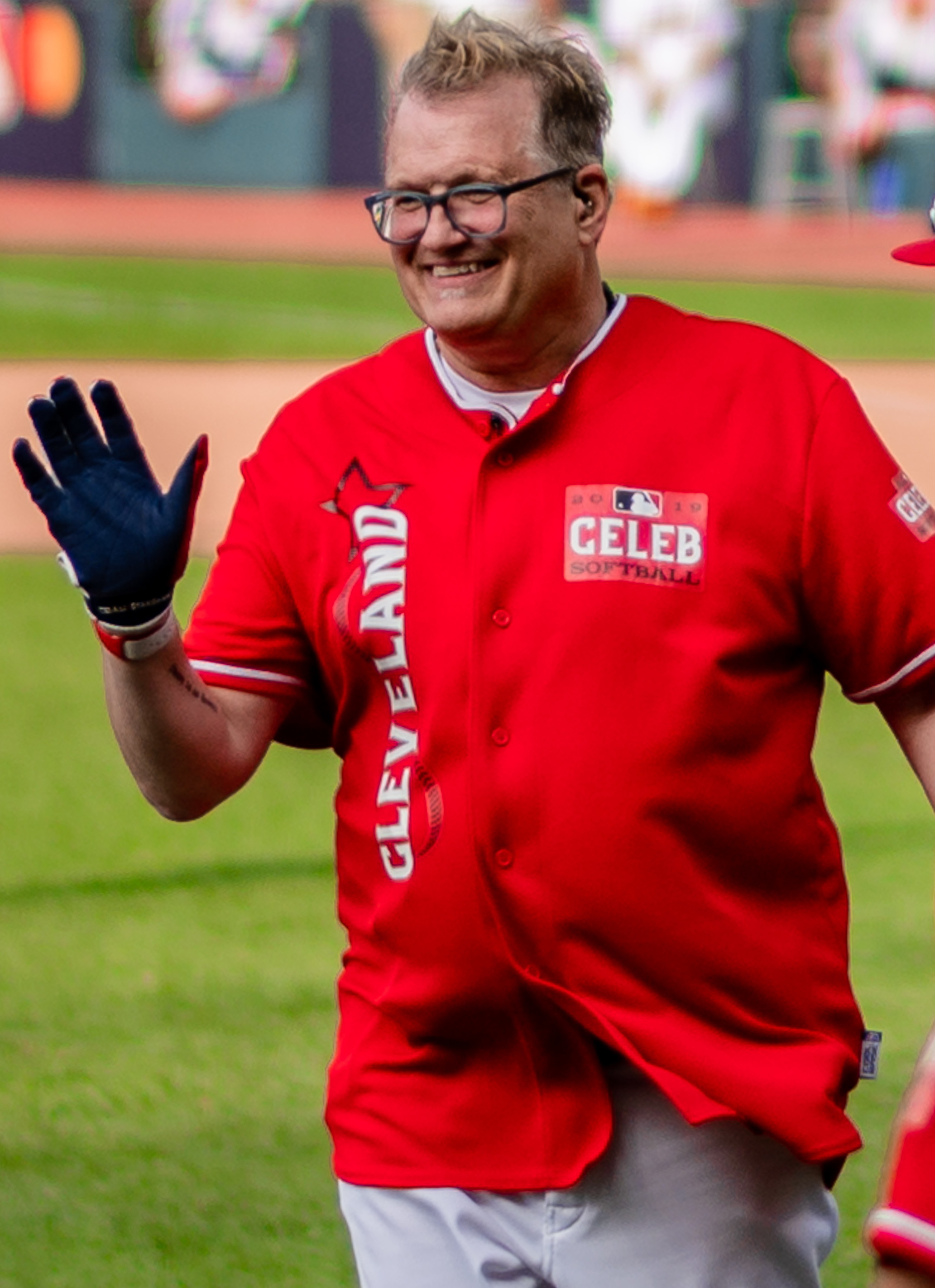
- Carey in 2019
- Born: Drew Allison Carey; May 23, 1958 (age 68); Cleveland, Ohio, U.S.
- Notable work: The Drew Carey Show; Drew Carey's Green Screen Show; Host of: Whose Line Is It Anyway? The Price Is Right; Power of 10; Drew Carey's Improv-A-Ganza

Comedy career
- Years active: 1985–present
- Medium: Film; stand-up; television
- Genre: Improvisational comedy
- Military service
- Allegiance: United States of America
- Branch: United States Marine Corps Reserve
- Service years: 1981–1987

Drew Allison Carey (born May 23, 1958) is an American comedian, game show host, and actor, and a reality host.

After serving in the U.S. Marine Corps and making a name for himself in stand-up comedy, Carey gained stardom in his own sitcom, The Drew Carey Show, and as host of the American version of the improv comedy show Whose Line Is It Anyway?, both of which aired on ABC. He then appeared in several films, television series, music videos, a made-for-television film, and a computer game. Since 2007, Carey has hosted the game show The Price Is Right on CBS.

Carey has diverse interests spanning sports, entertainment, and politics. He has worked as a photographer at U.S. men's national team soccer games. Carey is a minority owner of the Major League Soccer team Seattle Sounders FC, which won the MLS Cup, first in 2016 and again in 2019. He briefly participated in professional wrestling, entering the 2001 Royal Rumble, and was inducted into the WWE Hall of Fame in 2011. Carey has hosted a series of mini-documentaries on Reason.tv, advocating for libertarian principles such as private highway ownership, medical marijuana, and opposition to eminent domain abuses.

== Early life and education ==
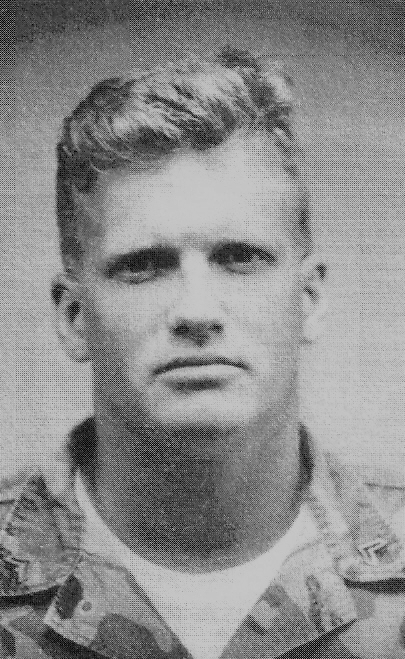
Carey in his U.S. Marine Corps uniform, with rank insignia of Corporal

Carey was born in Cleveland, Ohio, on May 23, 1958, to Lewis Carey and Beulah Neal. He has two older brothers, Neil (1946–2010) and Roger (born 1952), and was raised in the Old Brooklyn neighborhood of Cleveland. Drew was only eight years old when Lewis died from a heart attack. Drew played the cornet and trumpet in the marching band of James Ford Rhodes High School from which he graduated in 1976.

Carey continued on to college at Kent State University (KSU) and was a part of Delta Tau Delta fraternity. He was expelled twice for poor academic performance and left KSU after three years. Upon leaving the university, Carey enlisted into the United States Marine Corps Reserve in 1980 and served for six years as a field radio operator in the 25th Marine Regiment in Ohio. He moved to Las Vegas for a few months in 1983 and for a short time worked as a bank teller and a waiter at Denny's.

== Career ==
=== Stand-up career ===
Carey's early comedy influences included local Cleveland television hosts Ernie Anderson and "Big Chuck" Schodowski as well as humor magazines such as Mad, Sick, and Cracked. In 1985, Carey began his comedy career by following a suggestion by David Lawrence (a disc jockey friend who had been paying Carey to write jokes for Lawrence's radio show in Cleveland) to go to the library and check out books on how to write jokes. The following year, after winning an open mic contest, Carey became Master of Ceremonies at the Cleveland Comedy Club. He performed at comedy clubs over the next few years in Cleveland and Los Angeles. Carey's first national exposure was competing in the 1988 Star Search. Carey was working as a stand-up comedian when he appeared on The Tonight Show Starring Johnny Carson in November 1991. His performance that night impressed Carson, who invited Carey to the couch next to his desk; this was considered a rare honor for any comedian. That same year, Carey joined the 14th Annual Young Comedians Special on HBO and made his first appearance on Late Night with David Letterman. In 1994, Carey wrote his own stand-up comedy special, Drew Carey: Human Cartoon, which aired on Showtime and won a CableACE Award for Best Writing.

=== Acting career ===
==== Early roles ====
Carey's early stand-up career led to supporting roles on television shows during which he developed the character of a hapless middle-class bachelor. In 1993, Carey had a small role in the film Coneheads as a taxi passenger. In 1994, he co-starred with John Caponera in The Good Life, a short-lived sitcom on NBC. After the show was cancelled, Bruce Helford, a writer on the show, hired Carey as a consultant for the television show Someone Like Me.

==== The Drew Carey Show ====
After their stint on Someone Like Me, Carey and Helford developed and produced the storyline for The Drew Carey Show. The sitcom revolved around a fictionalized version of Carey, as he took on the stresses of life and work with his group of childhood friends. The show premiered on September 13, 1995, on ABC. In his autobiography, Carey revealed his frustration with having to deal with censors and being unable to employ the off-color humor common in his stand-up routines. Carey initially earned $60,000 per episode in the first seasons, then renegotiated for $300,000. By the final season, he was earning $750,000 per episode. The show had high ratings for its first few seasons, but declining ratings and increasing production costs (around $3 million per episode) precipitated its cancellation. The program had a total of 233 episodes over its nine-year run and Carey was one of four actors to appear in every season.

==== Improv television ====
While still starring in The Drew Carey Show, Carey began hosting the American version of the improvisational comedy show Whose Line Is It Anyway? in 1998. He would announce the improv cast, direct the games, and usually take part in the final game of the episode by improvising alongside the regular cast of performers. The show ran for a total of 220 episodes until cancellation in 2006 (it returned with host Aisha Tyler in 2013). In 1998, the New York Friars' Club made Carey the newest inductee of the group's Comedy Central Roast. His friend Ryan Stiles (who costarred in The Drew Carey Show and Whose Line Is It Anyway?) served as the roastmaster. Carey's income from Whose Line Is It Anyway? and The Drew Carey Show led to his inclusion on the Forbes list of highest-paid entertainers of 1998, at 24th with $45.5 million.

For the WB's 2004–2005 prime time schedule, Carey co-produced and starred in Drew Carey's Green Screen Show, a spin-off of Whose Line Is It Anyway?. It was canceled by the WB, but picked up shortly afterward by Comedy Central. The show's premise relied on the use of a green screen for some of the actors' improv interaction with each other. Animation on the screen was visible to the live audience and it was also inserted during post-production for the television audience.

In 2011, Carey began hosting a primetime improv show, called Drew Carey's Improv-A-Ganza. It was filmed at the MGM Grand in Las Vegas, Nevada, and first aired on April 11. The show took on the premise of Whose Line? and Drew Carey's Green Screen Show in that it features many of the same performers from both shows and did improv based on audience-provided suggestions.

==== Improv All-Stars ====
Carey was one of the founders of the Improv All-Stars, a group of 11 actors who perform in unscripted skits. The group joined Carey in all three of his improv shows, Whose Line Is It Anyway?, Drew Carey's Green Screen Show, and Drew Carey's Improv-A-Ganza, the 90-minute television special Drew Carey's Improv All Stars, and some members had major roles or guest-starred on The Drew Carey Show. The Improv All-Stars travel on comedy tours performing at comedy clubs throughout the United States.

=== Game show host ===
==== Power of 10 ====
Beginning in 2007, Carey began hosting game shows, beginning with his April selection as host of the CBS game show pilot Power of 10. The show ran from August 7, 2007, to January 23, 2008, and aired twice weekly during the late summer and early fall. Each game featured contestants predicting how a cross-section of Americans responded to questions covering a wide variety of topics in polls conducted by CBS.

==== The Price Is Right ====
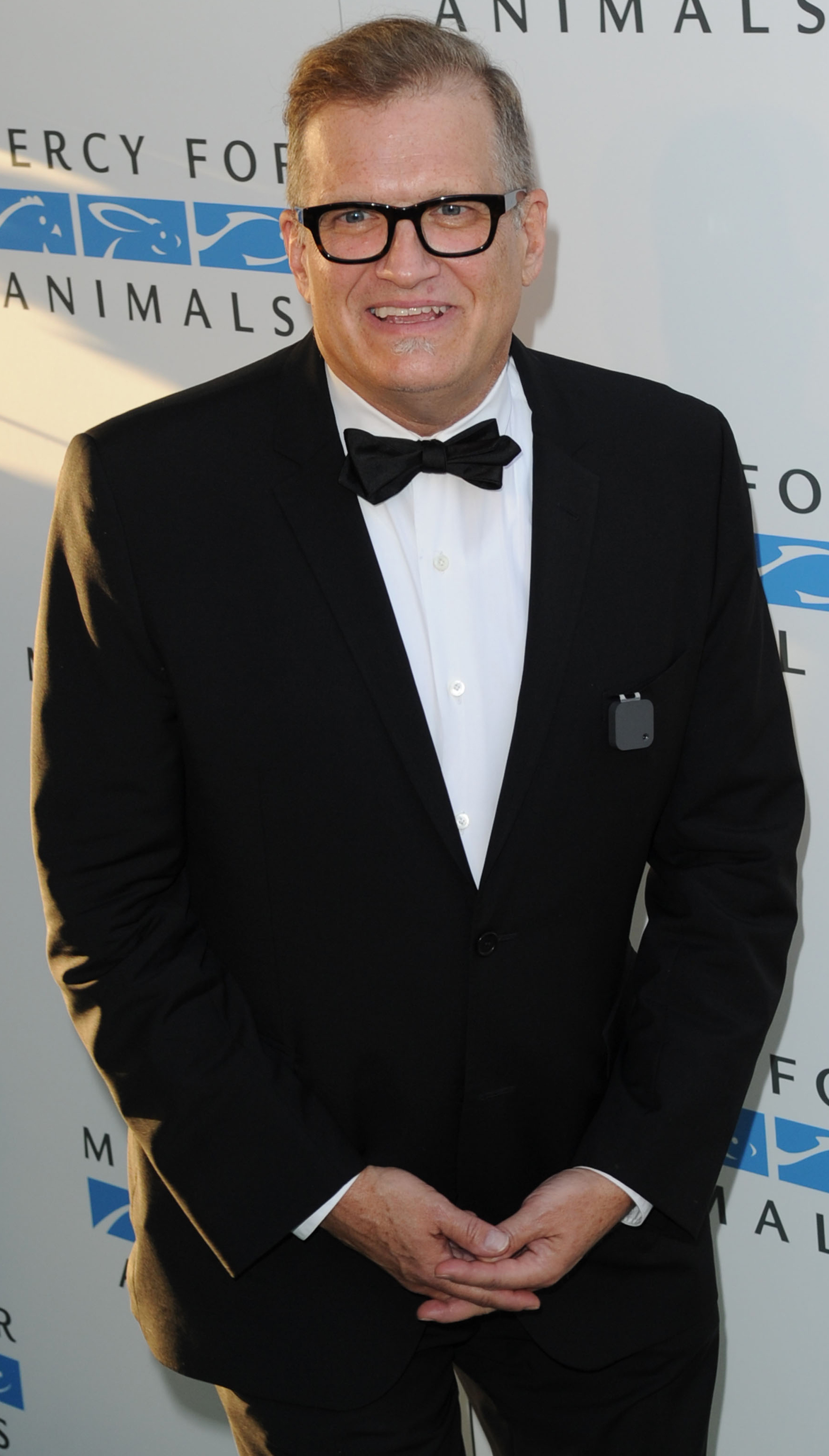
Carey at a Mercy for Animals charity event in 2014

After taping the pilot episode for Power of 10, Carey was contacted by CBS about replacing Bob Barker who had earlier announced his own retirement as host of The Price Is Right. After initially turning down the offer, Carey announced on Late Show with David Letterman that he would succeed Barker as host of the program beginning in the fall of 2007. Carey's first episode of The Price Is Right was taped on August 15, 2007, and his shows began airing on October 15, 2007. In response to replacing Barker as host of the game show, Carey stated, "You can't replace Bob Barker. I don't compare myself to anybody... It's only about what you're doing and supposed to do, and I feel like I'm supposed to be doing this." When Carey began hosting, the set, theme music, and show logo were updated. Carey has continued Barker's tradition of promoting spaying and neutering at the end of each episode. In 2022, Carey celebrated his fifteenth anniversary as host of the show. Following Bob Barker's death due to Alzheimer's disease on August 26, 2023, Carey hosted a one-hour special commemorating Barker's life and career.

=== Other roles and appearances ===
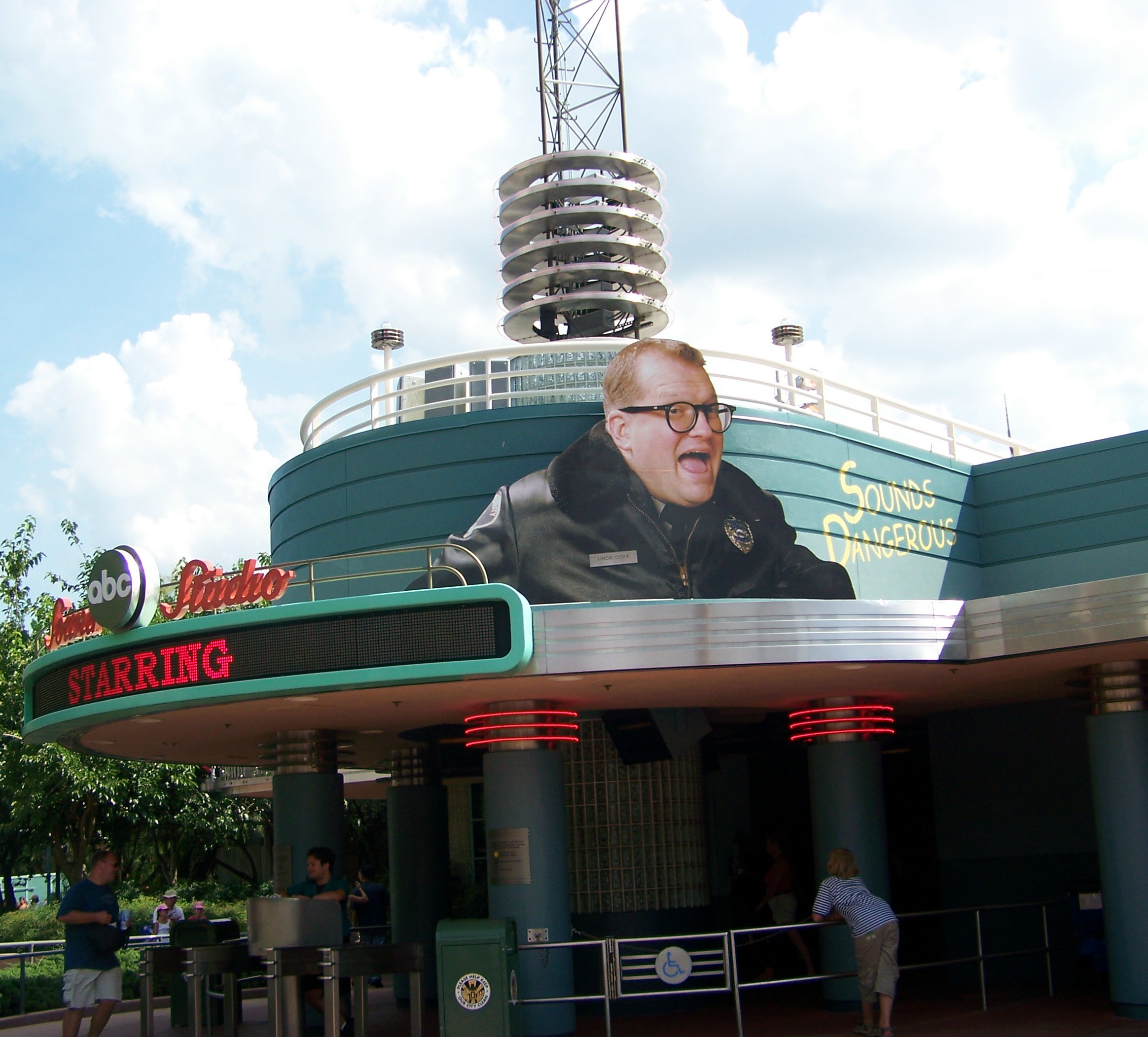
Entrance to Sounds Dangerous! at Disney's Hollywood Studios

Carey began appearing in commercials for restaurants in the late 1990s in Canada with The Great Root Bear, but his two-year contract with A&W Food Services of Canada was cut short in November 1998 after an episode of The Drew Carey Show featured McDonald's. As a result of his dismissal, Carey sued A&W for compensation.

Disney's Hollywood Studios (then "Disney-MGM Studios"), part of Walt Disney World Resort in Florida, debuted a 12-minute attraction in 1999 titled Sounds Dangerous!. In the show, a camera follows Carey through a day as an undercover detective. When his video camera fails, the audience is left in complete darkness wearing earphones following his adventure through sound cues. The attraction closed on May 18, 2012.

In 2000, Carey was given a cameo appearance in the House Party expansion pack of the computer game The Sims. To make him appear, the characters in the game must throw a successful party, which causes Carey to arrive in a limo and join the festivities. Carey is a fan of The Sims series and during one April Fool's episode of The Drew Carey Show a scene takes place completely within The Sims. Carey made several other cameo appearances in music videos, including "Weird Al" Yankovic's 1999 video for "It's All About the Pentiums" and Fountains of Wayne's 2004 video for "Mexican Wine", giving an introduction to the video as if it were on a stage.

On January 21, 2001, Carey entered as Vince McMahon's guest entrant in the Royal Rumble match.

Although primarily known for his television work, Carey has done limited film work with his first appearance in 1993's Coneheads. His next film was the 2000 television film Geppetto which debuted on The Wonderful World of Disney. The film, an adaptation of Pinocchio, included actor Wayne Brady who had joined Carey on his improv shows. Carey took singing lessons to prepare for the role. In 2005, Carey appeared in three films: the animated film Robots where he provided a voice-over for the character Crank; The Aristocrats where he retold a dirty joke along with other celebrities; and the documentary Fuck where he was interviewed.

Carey provided the entertainment for the 2002 Annual White House correspondents' dinner. Once Carey completed his stand-up routine for the 1,800 guests, President George W. Bush, noting Carey's improv work, made a joke of his own: "Drew? Got any interest in the Middle East?" In 2003, he joined Jamie Kennedy to host the WB's live special Play for a Billion. In September 2003, Carey led a group of comedians, including Blake Clark and The Drew Carey Show's Kathy Kinney, on a comedy tour of Iraq.

On June 8, 2006, Drew Carey's Sporting Adventures debuted on the Travel Channel. In this series, Carey traveled throughout Germany to photograph multiple FIFA World Cup soccer games while he immerses himself in the culture of the towns and states he visits. Carey appeared in Matt Groening's The Simpsons as part of the season 19 episode "All About Lisa" as a guest on the Krusty the Clown Show and again in Treehouse of Horror XXVII. He also surfaced in the second season of Community playing a well-liked former boss to Jeff Winger.

On March 4, 2014, it was announced on Good Morning America that Carey would compete on the season 18 of Dancing with the Stars. He was partnered with professional dancer Cheryl Burke. They were eliminated during the sixth week of the competition, finishing in 8th place.

Carey has also been a longtime host on SiriusXM channel, Little Steven's Underground Garage radio channel, where for 10 years he hosted a three-hour radio show called "Drew Carey's Friday Night Dance Party" which aired the last Friday of every month. In August 2018, Carey turned his monthly show into a weekly show called "The Friday Night Freak Out", which airs every Friday from 8:00pm to 11:00pm ET on SiriusXM.

In 2018, Carey appeared in an episode of NCIS as a retired Marine. His character was a sergeant, the last rank he held in real life. Real pictures of Carey in dress blues and everyday garb were on the plasma screen in the squad room. In 2020, Carey appeared as a contestant in season three of The Masked Singer as "Llama" where the costume had a centaur-like build to it. He was the second to be eliminated. In 2021, Carey participated in Celebrity Wheel of Fortune alongside Teri Hatcher and Chrissy Metz. He beat his fellow competitors in the first bonus round, but failed to solve the final bonus round puzzle.

On March 24, 2023, Carey experimented with an artificial clone of his voice on his "The Friday Night Freak Out" Underground Garage radio show, using a beta version of ElevenLabs and ChatGPT-generated jokes. The line "even Drew Carey can use it" was generated by prompting the chatbot to create a joke about how easy it can be used. Carey concluded that the audience still prefers a genuine personality since the listeners complained that the voice sounded "soulless" and unlike the "real Drew". On April 21, 2023, it was announced that Carey would be featured in an upcoming four-episode documentary by ABC News titled The Game Show Show, covering the history of game shows in America over the last eight decades. The four-part documentary premiered on May 10, 2023.

On September 30, 2026, it was announced that Carey would be the host of a "re-imagined" version of Undercover Boss at CBS, making him the first person to have ever hosted the series.

=== Writing ===
Carey has routinely written throughout his career. He wrote his own material in his early stand-up career before writing sitcoms. In 1997, Carey published his autobiography, Dirty Jokes and Beer: Stories of the Unrefined, wherein he shared memories of his early childhood and of his father's death when he was eight. Carey also revealed that he was once molested, had suffered bouts of depression, and had made two suicide attempts by swallowing a large number of sleeping pills. The book discusses his college fraternity years while attending Kent State University and his professional career up to that time. It was featured on The New York Times bestseller list for three months.

=== Photography ===
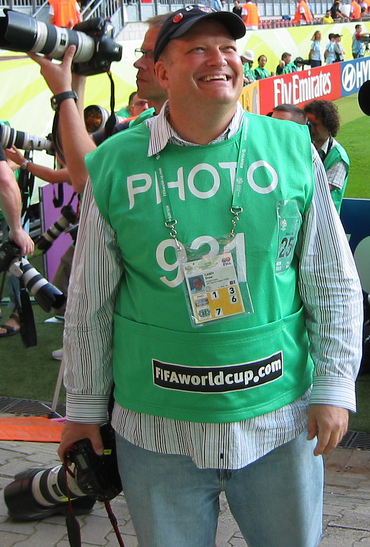
Carey at the World Cup Fest in Kaiserslautern, Germany, in June 2006, while filming Drew Carey's Sporting Adventures

Carey can sometimes be seen on the sidelines of U.S. National Team soccer games as a press photographer. His images are sold via wire services under the pseudonym Brooks Parkenridge. Carey was at the 2006 FIFA World Cup in the summer of 2006, for his television show Drew Carey's Sporting Adventures.

== Personal life ==
Carey adopted his crew cut hairstyle while serving in the United States Marine Corps. He underwent refractive surgery to correct his vision and, for a time, did not require glasses, but continued to wear them for purposes of recognition and celebrity identity. On the May 17, 2006, episode of Jimmy Kimmel Live!, Carey revealed that when he turned 40, he developed a need for bifocals.

Carey proposed to Nicole Jaracz in 2007. The couple did not wed and called off their engagement in 2012.

In January 2018, Carey announced his engagement to sex therapist Amie Harwick. They ended their engagement that November but remained close. On February 15, 2020, Harwick was found dead in a Hollywood Hills neighborhood and her ex-boyfriend, Gareth Pursehouse, was arrested and subsequently convicted of her murder. He was sentenced to life in prison without parole.

Carey is a Buddhist.

=== Health ===
After suffering chest pains while filming The Drew Carey Show in August 2001, Carey underwent a coronary angioplasty.

Although his weight was a comedic topic throughout his sitcom and improv shows, Carey began a diet and exercise plan in 2010 and lost considerable weight, which he also claimed had cured his Type 2 diabetes. He had cataract surgery in 2020.

=== Political views ===
Carey has voiced his political beliefs in several interviews, and in 1998, led a "smoke-in" in defiance of California's newly passed no-smoking ordinance inside bars and restaurants. He has hosted a series of mini-documentaries, The Drew Carey Project, on Reason.tv, an online project of Reason Foundation, a libertarian-oriented nonprofit think tank on whose board of trustees he sits. The first episode, "Gridlock", addresses private highway ownership and was released on October 15, 2007. Other episodes discuss topics such as eminent domain, urban traffic congestion, and medical marijuana.

Carey was an outspoken Libertarian in the 2000s. He said:

I believe the answers to all the problems we face as a society won't come from Washington, it will come from us. So the way we decide to live our lives and our decisions about what we buy or don't buy are much more important than who we vote for.

Carey expressed his distaste for the Bush administration's management of the Iraq War, specifically on the September 14, 2007, episode of Real Time with Bill Maher. He made donations to Ron Paul's presidential campaign for the 2008 election. On the September 26, 2008, episode of The Late Late Show with Craig Ferguson, Carey defined "libertarian" to host Craig Ferguson as "a conservative who still gets high." In 2016, he supported Libertarian Party presidential candidate Gary Johnson in his run for office, and was made an Honorary Chair of the campaign for California.

Carey donated money to Joe Biden in the 2020 United States presidential election. Earlier in that election cycle, he also donated to Tulsi Gabbard and Bill Weld.

=== Sports involvement ===
Carey is a devoted fan of the U.S. National Soccer Team, Cleveland Browns, Cleveland Cavaliers, Cleveland Guardians, and Columbus Blue Jackets. In 1999, he was part of the pregame ceremonies at the first game of the return of the Browns, televised on ESPN. Carey gave a speech before the game and said "I want to send a message. A message to everyone who ever made fun of Cleveland. A message to anyone who ever told a Cleveland joke, or laughed at a Cleveland joke. You can now officially shut up!" Carey attended the 2006 FIFA World Cup in Germany and the 2010 FIFA World Cup in South Africa. He is a minority owner of the Seattle Sounders FC who began to play in Major League Soccer on March 19, 2009, and won two MLS Cups (2016, 2019). Carey is a fan of FC Barcelona and was a season ticket holder for the LA Galaxy in 2006.

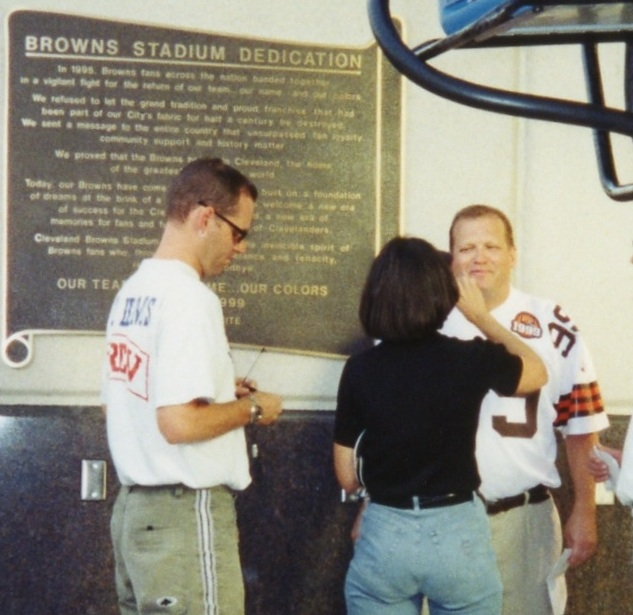
Carey preparing for a TV broadcast at the dedication of Cleveland Browns Stadium in September 1999

Carey has shown his support for the Cleveland baseball team by throwing the first pitch at an August 12, 2006 game against the Kansas City Royals. He was rewarded by them for being "the greatest Indians fan alive" with a personal bobblehead doll made in his likeness that was given to fans. Carey responded to his bobblehead likeness by saying "Bobblehead Day, for me, is as big as getting a star on the Hollywood Walk of Fame."

In 2001, Carey was the first television actor to enter World Wrestling Federation's 30-man "Royal Rumble" match, which he did to promote an improv comedy pay-per-view at the time. He appeared in a few backstage segments before his brief participation in the match. Upon entering the ring, Carey stood unopposed for more than half a minute, but after the next entrant, Kane, refused a monetary bribe, Carey eliminated himself from the match by jumping over the top rope and retreating from ringside. On April 2, 2011, Carey was inducted into the WWE Hall of Fame by Kane.

Carey competed against five other celebrities in the first celebrity edition of the 2003 World Poker Tour. He placed fifth, beating the only other actor, Jack Black. Carey won $2,000 for his charity.

On May 15, 2011, Carey completed the Marine Corps Historic Half Marathon in 1:57:02; then, on September 4, 2011, he completed the Disneyland Half Marathon in 1:50:46. On October 30, 2011, Carey finished the Marine Corps Marathon with a chip time of 4:37:11, placing 10,149th out of 20,940.

=== Philanthropy ===
Carey is a supporter of libraries, crediting them for beginning his successful comedy career. On May 2, 2000, in a celebrity edition of Who Wants to Be a Millionaire, Carey selected the Ohio Library Foundation to receive his $500,000 winnings. He later went on to win an additional $32,000 on the second celebrity Millionaire, making him one of the biggest winning contestants on Millionaire who did not win the top prize. Carey also has played on the World Poker Tour in the Hollywood Home games for the Cleveland Public Library charity. In June 2007, he offered to donate up to $100,000 (in $10,000 increments) to the Mooch Myernick Memorial Fund if anybody could beat him at the video game FIFA Soccer 07 for the Xbox 360. Carey dared five players from both the U.S. Men's and Women's National Teams to compete against him. He ended up donating $100,000, plus $60,000 for losing two games out of the six he played.

In October 2009, Carey made a bid of $25,000 in a charity auction for the @drew Twitter account. He later increased his offer to $100,000 if the number of followers of his account @DrewFromTV reached 100,000 by the end of the auction. In an interview with CBS News, he said he would instead donate $1 million to the charity Livestrong Foundation if his follower count reached one million by December 31, 2009.

In September 2014, Carey promised $10,000 to help find the perpetrators of a faked "ice bucket challenge" involving an autistic 15-year-old Ohio boy who, instead of being doused in ice cubes and water, received a shower of feces, urine, tobacco spit, and cigarette butts. Shortly thereafter, celebrities Donnie Wahlberg, Jenny McCarthy and Montel Williams matched Carey's offer. Several teens were eventually charged and admitted to the prank, though they denied that there were feces in the bucket or that they knew the victim was diagnosed with autism.

During the 2023 Writers Guild of America strike, Carey arranged to pay for free meals for striking writers at two Los Angeles restaurants, Swingers and Bob's Big Boy. According to the New York Times, his tab at Swingers was averaging $10,000 per week.

== Filmography ==
Carey has starred in only a few television shows and films but has made numerous guest-star appearances in a variety of sitcoms and comedy shows.

=== Film ===
Year	Title	Role	Notes
1993	Coneheads	Taxi passenger	
1999	The Big Tease	Himself	Cameo appearance
2005	Robots	Crank Casey	Voice role
2005	The Aristocrats	Himself	
2011	Jack and Jill	Himself	Cameo appearance

=== Television ===
Year	Title	Role	Notes
1992	The Torkelsons	Herby Scroggins	Episode: "Say Uncle"
1993	Drew Carey: Human Cartoon	Himself	Movie; also writer & executive producer
1994	The Good Life	Drew Clark	13 episodes
1995	Freaky Friday	Stan Horner	Made-for-TV movie
1995–2004	The Drew Carey Show	Drew Carey	233 episodes; also co-creator and executive producer; writer of 4 episodes
1996	Lois & Clark: The New Adventures of Superman	Herbie Saxe	Episode "Ghosts"
1997	Home Improvement	Seymour "Sy" Winterfleffin	Episode: "Totally Tool Time"
1997	The Weird Al Show	Himself	Episode: "The Competition"
1997	Sabrina the Teenage Witch	Himself	Episode: "To Tell a Mortal"
1997	Dharma & Greg	Himself	Episode: "Instant Dharma"
1998	The Larry Sanders Show	Himself	Episode: "Beverley's Secret"
1998–2007	Whose Line Is It Anyway?	Himself/host	219 episodes; also executive producer
1999	The Norm Show	Steve	Episode: "Gambling Man"
1999	King of the Hill	Hal	Episode: "Not in My Back-hoe"
2000	Baby Blues	Himself	Episode: "Bizzy Moves In"
2000	Who Wants to Be a Millionaire	Himself/Player	Episode 90 and 173 ($532,000)
2000	Geppetto	Geppetto	Made-for-TV movie
2001	Royal Rumble	Himself	5th Entrant
2001	Drew Carey's Improv All-Stars	Himself	
2004–2005	Drew Carey's Green Screen Show	Host/Performer	Also executive producer
2004–2015	The Late Late Show	Host	14 episodes (also a frequent guest)
2006	Drew Carey's Sporting Adventures	Himself	
2007–2008	Power of 10	Host	15 episodes
2007–present	The Price Is Right	Host	
2008–2016	The Simpsons	Himself	2 episodes
2010	Community	Ted	Episode: "Accounting for Lawyers"
2011	Drew Carey's Improv-A-Ganza	Host/Performer	40 episodes; also executive producer
2011	Family Guy	Himself	Episode: "New Kidney in Town"
2012	Talking Dead	Himself/Guest	Season 3 Preview Special
2014	Dancing with the Stars	Himself/Contestant	Finished 8th in season 18
2014	The Late Late Show with Craig Ferguson	Himself	2 episodes
2016	Scorpion	Himself	Episode: The Fast and the Nerdiest
2017	Bill Nye Saves the World	Himself	Extinction: Why All Our Friends Are Dying
2018	NCIS	Marine Sergeant John Ross	Episode: "Handle with Care"
2019	American Housewife	Mr. Green	Episode: "Bigger Kids, Bigger Problems"
2020	The Masked Singer	Llama	Eliminated in episode two
2020	Celebrity Family Feud	Himself	Lost to Kevin Nealon and his friends
2021	Celebrity Wheel of Fortune	Himself/Contestant	Episode: "Drew Carey, Teri Hatcher & Chrissy Metz"
2023	The Game Show Show	Himself	Game show documentary

=== Music videos ===
Year	Title	Role	Artist	Notes
1999	All About the Pentiums	Backup dancer	"Weird Al" Yankovic	Cameo

== Awards and honors ==
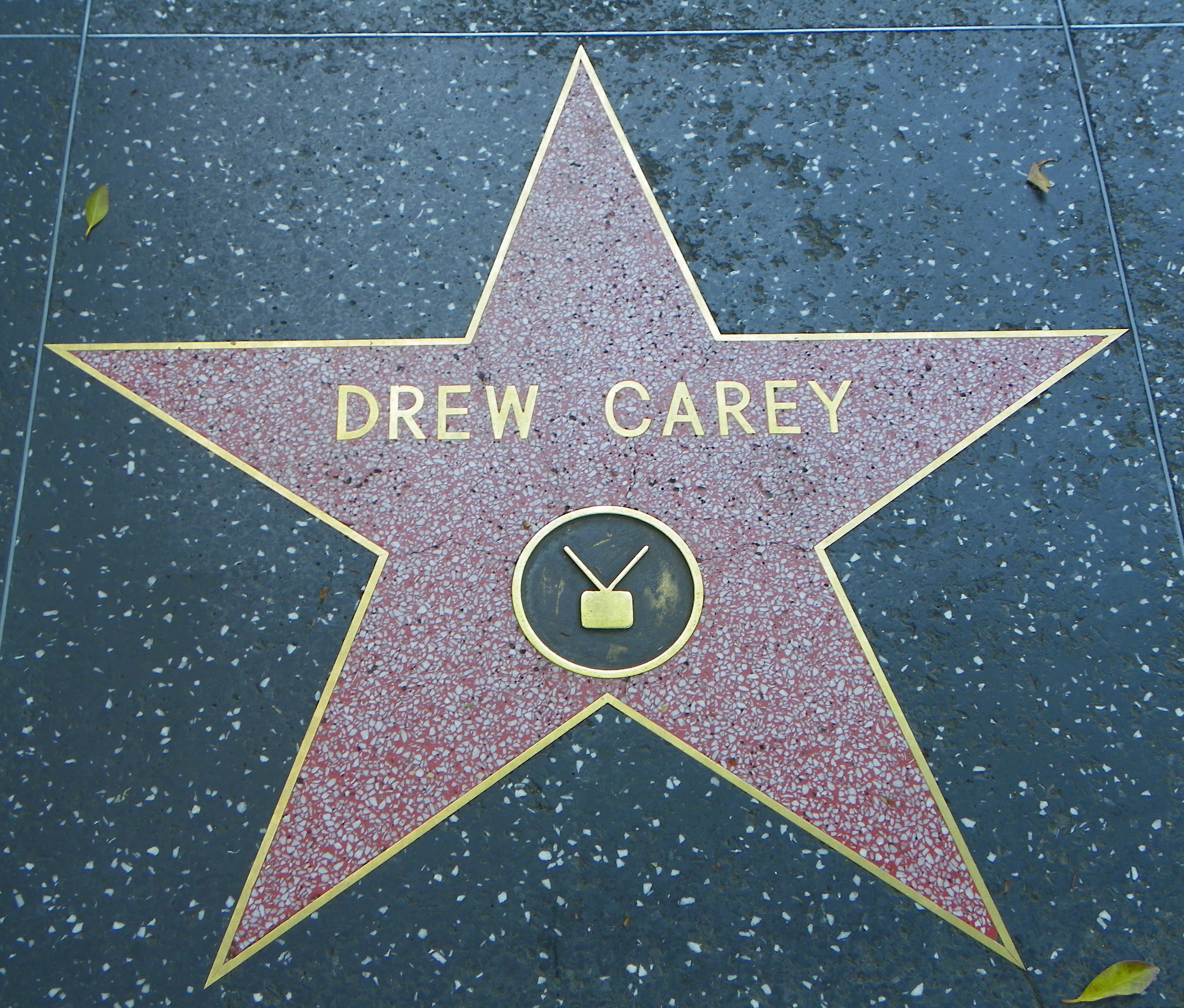
Carey's star on the Hollywood Walk of Fame

Entertainment/Media

- 1994: CableACE Award for Best Writing: Drew Carey: Human Cartoon
- 1995: TV Guide "10 Hottest New Faces of 1995"
- 1998: Satellite Award for Best Actor – Musical or Comedy Series
- 2000: People's Choice Award for Favorite Male Television Performer
- 2004: Comedy Central's 100 Greatest Stand-Ups of All Time (#84)
- 2011: Southern California Journalism "Best Advocacy Journalism" Award winner

Sports

- Two-time MLS Cup champion (as co-owner of the Seattle Sounders FC - 2016, 2019)
- CONCACAF Champions League Champion 2022 (as co-owner of the Seattle Sounders FC)
- Club World Cup qualifier 2025 facing PSG, Atletico Madrid, and Botafogo (as co-owner of the Seattle Sounders FC)
- Leagues Cup Champion 2025 (as co-owner of the Seattle Sounders FC)

Military

- 2021: United States Navy Memorial Lone Sailor Award (presented on the July 2, 2021 episode of The Price is Right)

Halls of Fame

- 2003: Star on the Hollywood Walk of Fame
- 2011: WWE Hall of Fame

Honorary

- 2000: DHL from Cleveland State University

== Bibliography ==
- Dirty Jokes and Beer: Stories of the Unrefined (1997) – ISBN 0-7868-6351-X
