= A&W Root Beer =

Root beer brand

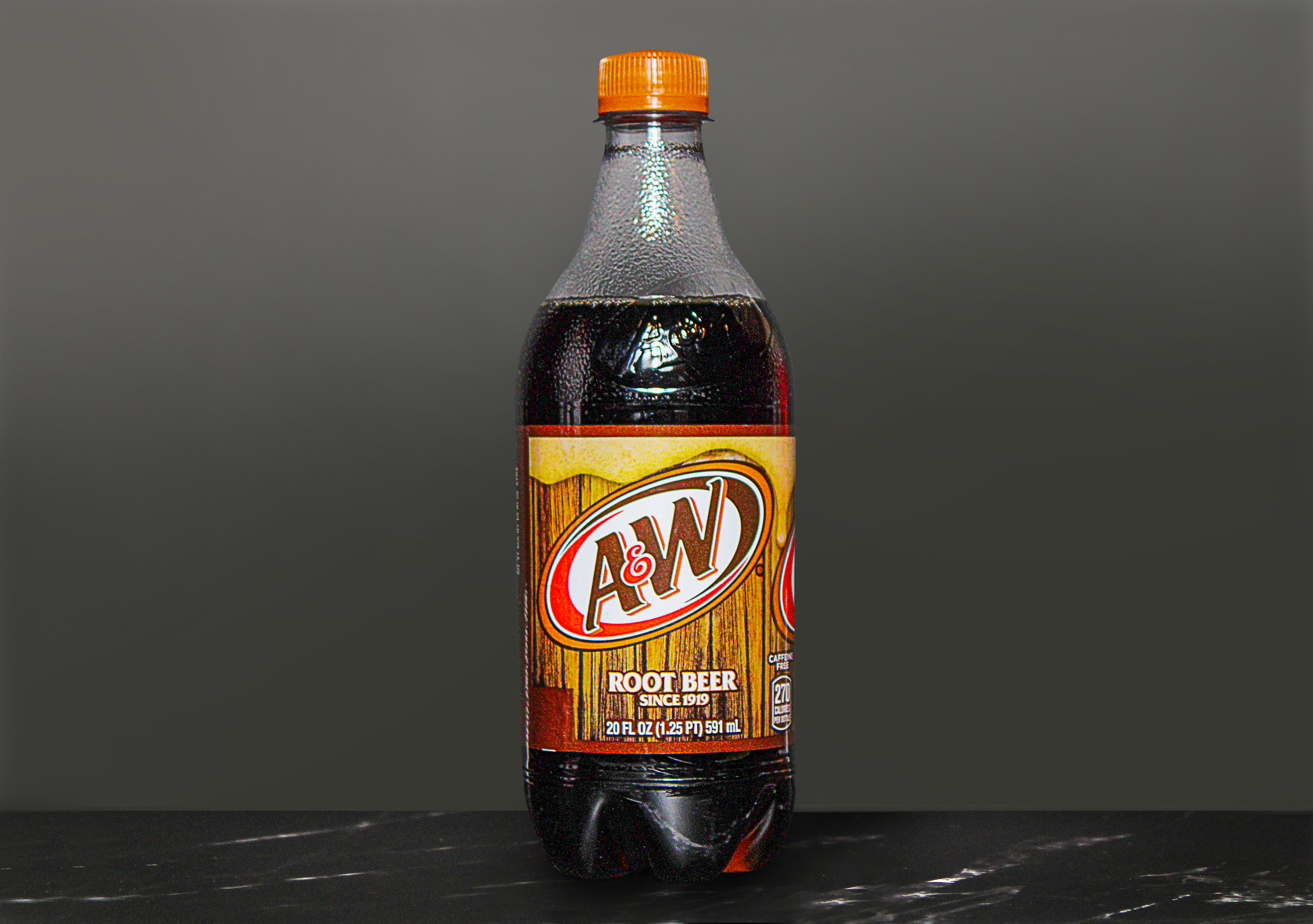
- Type: Root Beer
- Manufacturer: Keurig Dr Pepper (United States, rest of world, Except: Canada, Malaysia and Philippines); A&W Canada, Coca-Cola Canada Bottling Company (Canada); Coca-Cola Beverages Philippines (as A&W Sarsaparilla, Philippines)
- Origin: United States
- Introduced: 1919; 107 years ago
- Related products: Barq's, Mug Root Beer, Dad's Root Beer, Hires Root Beer, A&W Cream Soda
- Website: www.rootbeer.com

A&W Root Beer
Nutritional value per 8.1 fl oz / 1 cup / 240 ml
- Energy: 120 kcal (500 kJ)
- Carbohydrates: 31
- Sugars: 31
- Dietary fiber: 0
- Fat: 0
- Saturated: 0
- Trans: 0
- Protein: 0
Vitamins and minerals
Vitamins	Quantity %DV^{†}
Vitamin A equiv.	0% 0 μg
Vitamin C	0% 0 mg
Minerals	Quantity %DV^{†}
Calcium	0% 0 mg
Iron	0% 0 mg
Potassium	0% 0 mg
Sodium	1% 30 mg
- Other constituents: Quantity
- Cholesterol: 0
- ^{†}Percentages estimated using US recommendations for adults, except for potassium, which is estimated based on expert recommendation from the National Academies.

A&W Root Beer is an American brand of root beer that was founded in 1919 by Roy W. Allen and primarily available in the United States and Canada. Allen partnered with Frank Wright in 1922, creating the A&W brand and inspiring a chain of A&W Restaurants founded that year. Originally, A&W Root Beer sold for five cents (equivalent to $0.93 in 2025).

The rights to the A&W brand (except in Canada) are owned by Keurig Dr Pepper, which in turn licenses the brand to the U.S.-based A&W Restaurant chain. A&W Root Beer products are distributed via various U.S. bottlers. A&W Food Services of Canada, which is independent of both Keurig Dr Pepper and the U.S. restaurant chain, is responsible for the restaurants and marketing of root beer products in Canada, with retail products bottled and distributed by the Coca-Cola Company. The U.S. variant is also sold as an import drink in Southeast Asia and Italy (where A&W has restaurants), as well as in Australia, Chile, and other countries.

== History ==
Roy W. Allen opened a roadside root beer stand in Lodi, California, in 1919, using a formula he had purchased from a pharmacist. He soon opened stands in Stockton, and five stands in nearby Sacramento where "tray boys" pioneered drive-in curbside service.

In 1922, Allen partnered with Frank Wright, birthing the A&W brand name. Allen bought Wright out, obtained a trademark, and began selling restaurant franchises - creating one of the early restaurant chains in the United States. Franchise owners could use the A&W name and logo and purchased concentrated root beer syrup from Allen. However, there was no common menu, architecture, or set of procedures, and some chose to sell food as well.

By 1933, there were 170 A&W franchises. During World War II, franchisees struggled with labor shortages and sugar rationing, but after the war the number of A&W outlets tripled, helped in part by the availability of GI loans. The proliferation of the automobile and the mobility it offered also led to growth; by 1950 there were more than 450 A&W Root Beer stands in operation. That year, Allen retired and sold the business to Nebraskan Gene Hurtz, who formed the A&W Root Beer Company.

The first A&W Root Beer outlet in Canada opened in 1956.

By 1960, the number of A&W restaurants swelled to more than 2,000.

In 1963, the company was sold to the J. Hungerford Smith Company, which had produced Allen's concentrate since 1921. Also in 1963, the first overseas A&W restaurant opened in Guam. In 1966, Hungerford was sold to the United Fruit Company, which merged with AMK Corporation in 1970 to form the United Brands Company. In 1971, United Brands formed a wholly owned subsidiary, A&W Distributing Co., to retail its root beer. After test runs in Arizona and California (Phoenix, Tucson and San Diego), the products were distributed nationally, including sugar-free, low-sodium, and caffeine-free versions.

In 1974, A&W introduced "The Great Root Bear", a mascot that served as a goodwill ambassador for the brand. The bear and its associated jingle became the basis of a long-running Canadian advertising campaign. The mascot was so successful that it was eventually adopted by the American A&W chain as well.

A&W Restaurants was formed in the late '70s to manage restaurant franchising. It was bought in 1982 by A. Alfred Taubman.

In 1983, United Brands sold A&W Root Beer to a group of investors led by Castle & Cooke. In 1984, it had an advertising budget of $10 million. In 1986, Hicks & Haas and management bought A&W from the investor group.

A&W Cream Soda and A&W Diet Cream Soda were introduced and distributed nationally in 1986, followed in 1987 by the reformulation of A&W Sugar-Free as Diet A&W. Also in 1986, A&W acquired Squirt. The company went public in 1987 and also acquired Vernors.

In October 1993, A&W Beverages was folded into Cadbury Beverages. It spun off its U.S. beverages business as Dr Pepper Snapple Group in 2008.

In July 2017, A&W Canada reformulated its root beer, dropping high fructose corn syrup and some flavors from the recipe, substituting cane sugar, sarsaparilla root, licorice, birch bark and anise. A&W Canada launched the new formula by declaring Free Root Beer Day, serving free root beer at all locations on July 22, 2017.

In November 2020, Diet A&W was rebranded as A&W Zero Sugar.

== Brands ==
- A&W Sugar-Free was introduced in 1974 and reformulated as Diet A&W in 1987. In 2020, it was rebranded again under the name A&W Zero Sugar.
- A&W Cream Soda and A&W Diet Cream Soda were introduced in 1986.
- A&W Float, an ice cream float-inspired bottled drink, was introduced in 2008.
- A&W TEN, a low-calorie root beer, began appearing in American supermarkets in the spring of 2013.
- A&W Ice Cream Sundae and A&W Zero Sugar Ice Cream Sundae were introduced in 2025 for a limited time.

== Advertising ==
The beverage made an advertising campaign in 1978 under the tagline "Now New York Has Everything", which was created to promote the arrival of A&W Root Beer in the New York metro area. For this end, the A&W Distributing Company signed a one-year $1 million advertising contract with Humphrey Browning MacDougall in March 1978. The goal was to remedy its geographic disparities (although it was the leading root beer brand, at the time, it had a penetration of 46% of the national population) and was meant to boost sales of root beer, which was the fourth most-sold type of soft drink. In the markets where it was available, it was advertised under its "frosty mug taste" tagline. New York received a special campaign featuring four 30-second spots about people from various parts of the United States who moved to New York and noticed the lack of the beverage. There was also a longer 60-second spot that ran on April 18, 1978 on the six commercial VHF stations in the area.

In July 1982, advertiser Scott Miller of Humphrey Browning MacDougall started becoming responsible for the product's hard sell. In April 1984, a new commercial began circulating on American television. It emulated beer commercials on the onset, featuring two lumberjacks in a rustic tavern. Halfway through the commercial, one of the lumberjacks was desiring a mug of A&W Root Beer. This campaign coincided with a change in its distribution scheme, which was now targeting truck drivers and sales representatives, who distributed the product to roughly half of the national population. For two periods during the summer of 1984, A&W would only advertise the floats. The campaign was advertised on network TV, 90 media markets and, for the first time, cable, booking slots on MTV and WTBS, the latter during Night Tracks. The sugar free version was set to be advertised alongside an exercise program on Lifetime.

New commercials for the range of sodas began circulating in January 1991. The three commercials featured former A-list celebrities, each one advertising a different product. The cream soda commercial featured Dick Wilson (appearing in character as Mr. Whipple from the Charmin commercials) squeezing a can of it, while the zero sugar version featured Jan Miner (as Madge from Palmolive). Both of the commercials did not feature their signature lines from their respective commercials. The main root beer was fronted by Mr. T, using his early 80s accessories, which the Chicago Tribune called "a symbol of a dead decade as Donald Trump". In the summer of 1992, a campaign featuring David Leisure as Joe Isuzu was carried on American television, continuing A&W's fad of recovering older celebrities who starred in commercials.

The soda started using the "frosty mug taste" tagline in the fall of 1992, coinciding with its new packaging and plans to rebound its marketing for 1993. In May 1999, it unveiled the "It's Good to be Thick Headed" campaign for network and cable. This consisted of three commercials: "Mr. Dumass" (in which a job applicant mispronounces the name of the owner as "Mr. Dumbass"), "Bachelor Party" (where a dim-witted husband and his wife are put inside a doghouse) and "Witness Protection". These commercials, whose target audience was mainly male sports fans, were discarded at the end of 2001 and set to be replaced by a new set of commercials for a broader demographic, as research revealed that the drink was also popular with teen girls.

== Promotions and contests ==
- Through eBay, A&W and Jim Belushi offered a trip to Los Angeles with a VIP pass to the "A&W Ultimate All-American Cookout and Concert" at the House of Blues.
- In celebration of its 100th anniversary, A&W offered a free two-liter bottle of its root beer in exchange for taking the Family Fun Pledge, which asked participants to be "technology-free for one hour every Friday night this summer."

== The Great Root Bear ==
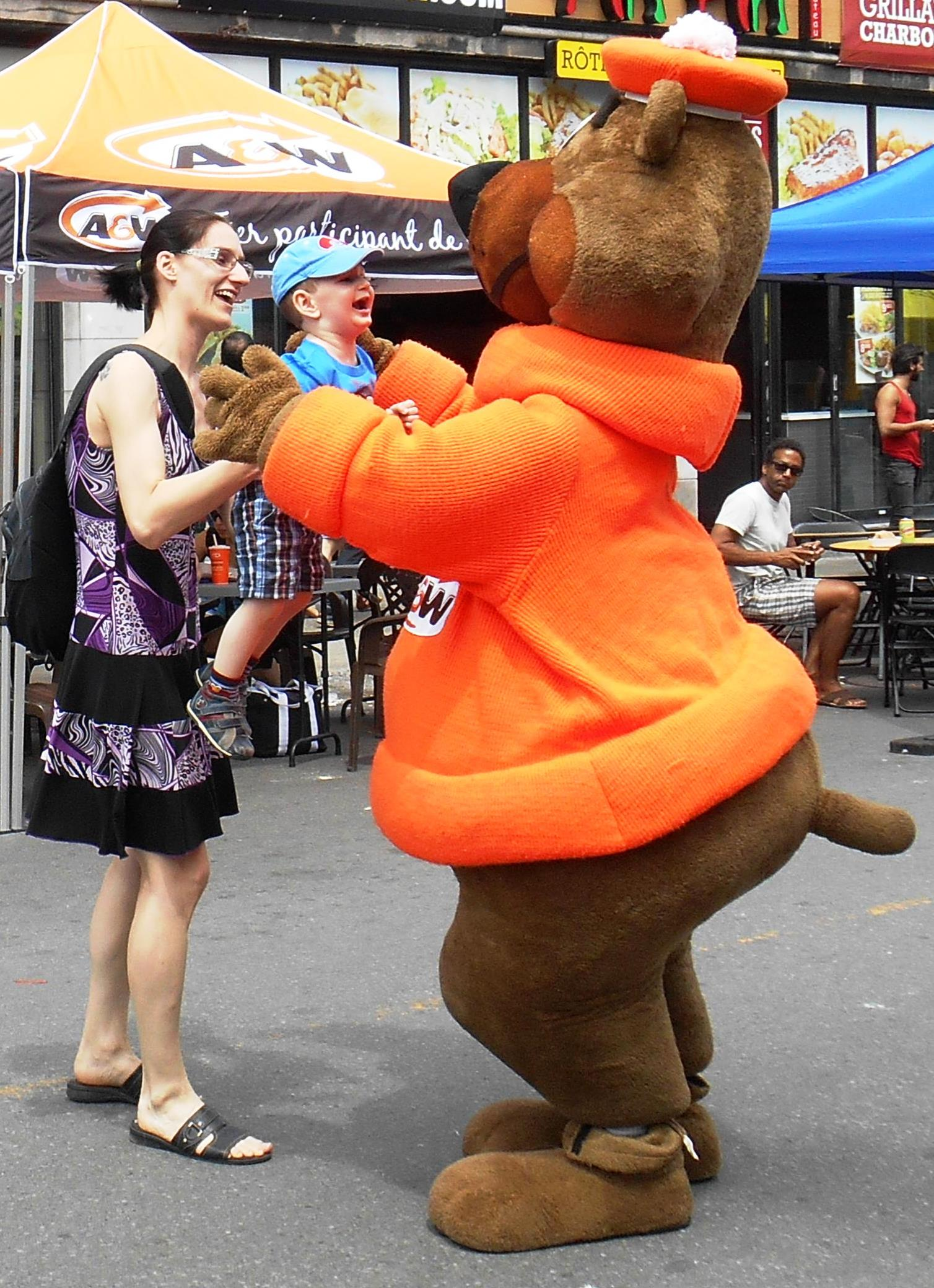
Rooty in his Canadian version

The Great Root Bear, also called Rooty, became the mascot for A&W Root Beer in 1973.

In a long-running television advertising campaign for the Canadian A&W chain, his theme was a tuba-driven jingle entitled "Ba-Dum, Ba-Dum". The jingle was released as a single by Attic Records in Canada. It was credited to "Major Ursus", a play on the constellation name Ursa Major, which means "great bear". The famous Canadian composer and B.C. Hall of Fame enshrinee Robert Buckley helped compose the song.

In late 2011, the new ownership of A&W began using the mascot again, particularly in A&W's online presence.

== A&W Restaurants ==
A&W Restaurants logo

Shortly after Allen bought out Wright's portion of the business he began franchising the product. His profits came from a small franchise fee and sales of concentrate. There was no standard food menu for franchises until 1978. By 1960 the company had 2,000 stores.

In 1989 A&W made an agreement with Minnesota-based chain Carousel Snack Bars to convert that chain's 200 locations (mostly kiosks in shopping malls) to "A&W Hot Dogs & More". Some A&W Hot Dogs & More locations are in operation today.

Many A&W locations that opened in the U.S. during the Yum! Brands ownership years (2002–2011) were co-branded with Yum!'s other chains—Long John Silver's, Taco Bell, Pizza Hut or KFC.

As of December 2011 A&W was under new ownership and its world headquarters was moved back to Lexington, Kentucky. Since then, in the United States and Southeast Asia, A&W has been owned by a group of franchisees (as A Great American Brand).
