= A&W Cream Soda =

Carbonated soft drink

- Type: Cream soda
- Manufacturer: Keurig Dr Pepper
- Origin: United States
- Introduced: 1986; 40 years ago
- Related products: A&W Root Beer, Dr. Pepper

A&W Cream Soda is a cream soda carbonated soft drink introduced by A&W Root Beer in 1986.

A&W Cream Soda and A&W Diet Cream Soda were introduced in 1986. A&W Cream Soda is currently the top brand in cream sodas.

In 2017, the product was reformulated to be caffeine free.

== Marketing ==
In the summer of 1991, A&W launched its most popular cream soda advertising campaign, cans with Snoopy and Woodstock, characters from the Peanuts comic strip created by Charles M. Schulz. Snoopy can be seen playing baseball, having a cookout, lifting weights, surfing, walking the beach, riding a bike, jumping hurdles, and listening to music. These cans were very popular with consumers and collectors of Peanuts memorabilia. The images were used on regular A&W cream soda as well as Diet A&W cream soda cans.

Coca-Cola's first polar bear print advertisement made its debut in 1922, and for the next 70 years, polar bears appeared sporadically in print advertising. A&W, the leading root beer marketer, filmed their own commercial using polar bears in the summer of 1992. In that commercial, a real polar bear is seen in contrast to a mechanical polar bear that is ice-skating in a fancy skirt. The commercial used the polar bears to distinguish a difference between regular A&W cream soda and sparkling A&W cream soda. They use the real bear yawning to embody the regular cream soda, and they use the ice-skating polar bear to represent the sparkling cream soda. The polar bears are used as a marketing technique to appeal to a large audience. "They are white, which is the color of innocence, even though in this case it's 800 pounds of skin-ripping innocence," Mr. Gilbert said.

Also, in 1992 Pepsi-Cola International and A&W Brands Inc. worked together over a signed agreement to increase the spread of A&W's bottled products in Asia. The company anticipated to sell $500 million of A & W soft drinks in Asia within the span of ten years to make the company's brands as prevalent as Pepsi, which was already distributed in Guam and Indonesia. In 1994, A&W put $7 million into their marketing promotions. They partnered with the show Baywatch to produce greater sales for their product. Baywatch was ranked second among all of the popular TV shows, so they knew this was a great opportunity. In-show placement on four episodes of Baywatch appeared. The advertisement was shown as sponsors of a boogie board test during the episode. The winner of the boogie board contest on the television show would receive a year's supply of A&W.

A&W cream soda also spent $1.5 million in ads commemorating "a little sparkle in a vanilla world." A new A&W campaign from New York, which featured regular people, kids to grandparents, all describing their satisfaction of A&W. The campaign took a different direction from A&W's common and past humorous ads, using sepia-toned images. Their new tag-line introduced: “authentic.”

In addition to making A&W well known in different countries, using Snoopy, making new marketing campaigns with polar bears, and using the show Baywatch, A&W cream soda has had a few commercials. Joe Isuzu appeared in cream soda commercials as well as William Sanderson and the Sumangala Band.

== Nutritional information ==
=== A&W Cream Soda ===
Serving size: 12 fl. oz. (355 mL)
Amount per serving:

- Calories: 170
- Total fat: 0 g
- Sodium: 70 mg
- Total carb: 46 g
- Caffeine: 0 mg
- Sugars: 45 g
- Protein: 0 g

Ingredients: Carbonated water, high fructose corn syrup and/or sugar, sodium benzoate (preservative), natural and artificial flavors, caramel color, citric acid, yucca extract, flavored with vanilla extract.

=== A&W Diet Cream Soda ===
Serving size: 8 fl. oz. (240 mL)
Amount per serving:

- Calories: 0
- Total fat: 0 g
- Sodium: 160 mg
- Total carb: 0 g
- Sugars: NA
- Protein: 0 g

Ingredients: Carbonated water, sodium benzoate (preservative), aspartame, caramel color, citric acid, yucca extract, natural and artificial flavors.
