= Kevin Bazner =

American businessman (born 1955)

Kevin Bazner (born 1955) is an American businessman, working in the restaurant sector since 1970. Since 1985, he has worked at A&W Restaurants, first by assisting in its international operations, then acting as CEO from 1999 to 2025.

== Biography ==
Bazner was born in 1955.

In 1970, he started working at a kitchen restaurant. Over time, he became the director of Canadian operations of Magic Pan Restaurants. He was appointed president of the international branch of A&W Restaurants in 1985; by 1990, he was living in Kuala Lumpur, capital of Malaysia, where A&W has a strong presence.

On August 2, 1990, after being in the United States with his family for a month, he was held hostage in Kuwait on the day Iraq invaded the country. He was aboard a plane bound for Malaysia, which was refueling. He was taken to the Rashid Hotel in Baghdad during this period. He appeared in footage taken by Iraqi television at the end of the month. He was released in December.

In July 1999, Bazner became the president of A&W Restaurants during a corporate restructuring. He had a key role in the acquisition of the chain by A Great American Brand, LLC, alongside franchises in Asia and Dale Mulder, which took over A&W at the end of 2011.

On March 4, 2025, Bazner changed his role at A&W by becoming a chairman, when Betsy Schmandt took over as CEO.

== Education ==
Bazner attended Oakland Community College and the University of Michigan.

== Personal life ==
Bazner married Dawn, a British woman, and had two children, Elizabeth and David. While held hostage in Iraq, his son David had a hernial condition.
