= A&W Restaurants =

American fast food chain

A&W Concentrate Company

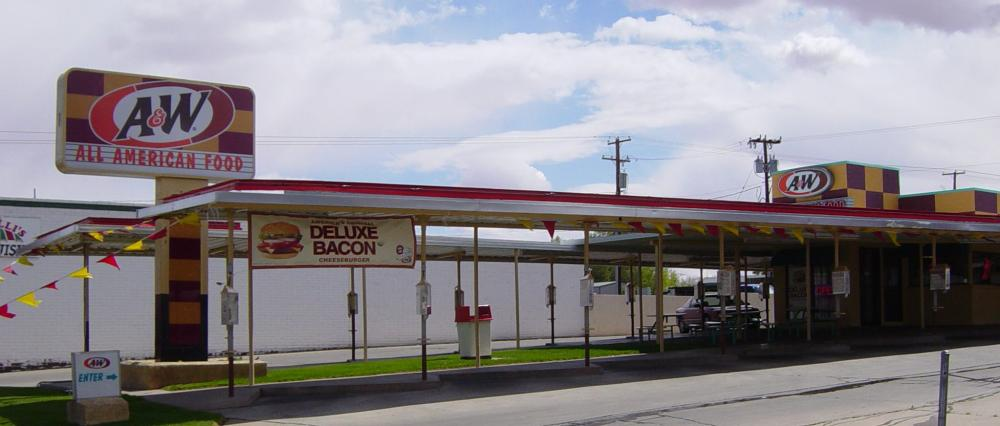
- A now closed A&W restaurant in Page, Arizona
- Trade name: A&W
- Type: Private
- Industry: Restaurant
- Genre: Fast food
- Founded: 1919 (as a root beer stand); 1923 in Lodi, California, U.S.
- Founder: Roy W. Allen; Frank Wright
- Headquarters: Lexington, Kentucky, U.S.
- Number of locations: 900+
- Area served: United States; Southeast Asia
- Key people: Kevin Bazner (Chairman of the Board); Betsy Schmandt CEO President )
- Products: Hamburgers, fried chicken and tenders, hot dogs, root beer, root beer floats, cheese curds, waffles, soft serve, french fries, milkshakes and rice
- Revenue: ▲$330 million (2020)
- Owner: A Great American Brand, LLC
- Number of employees: approx. 35,000 (2019)
- Website: awrestaurants.com

A&W Restaurants, Inc. is an American fast food restaurant chain distinguished by its "Burger Family" combos, draft root beer and root beer floats. A&W's origins date back to 1919 when Roy W. Allen set up a roadside drink stand offering root beer at a parade honoring returning World War I veterans in Lodi, California. Allen's employee, Frank Wright, partnered with him in 1922 and they founded their first A&W restaurant in Sacramento, California, in 1923. The company name was taken from the initials of their last names – Allen and Wright. The company became famous in the United States for its "frosty mugs" – the mugs were kept in a freezer and filled with A&W Root Beer just before being served to customers.

Evolving into a franchise in 1926, the company today has over 900 locations in 16 countries, with 460 in the United States, Southeast Asian countries and Germany, serving a fast-food menu of hamburgers, hot dogs and french fries. A number of outlets serve as drive-in restaurants that have carhops. Previously owned by Yum! Brands, the chain was sold in December 2011 to a consortium of A&W franchisees through A Great American Brand, LLC. A&W restaurants in Canada have been part of a separate and unaffiliated chain since 1972.

== History ==
=== Founding and early years ===
On June 20, 1919, Roy W. Allen opened his first root beer stand in Lodi, California. The first day was for a homecoming celebration of soldiers who returned from battle in World War I. The following day, his stand was open for regular customers, selling root beer glasses for 5 cents (equivalent to $0.93 in 2025). The following year, Allen opened a second stand in Stockton, California. Shortly afterward, the effect of the period of prohibition that existed in the United States from 1920 to 1933 gave Allen and his stand with a beverage with "beer" in the name a heavy rebound. Four years later, A&W began when Allen and Frank Wright opened their drive-in restaurant in Sacramento, California, combining both of their initials for the name, and selling the root beer from Allen's stand. Curbside service was provided by tray boys and tray girls. In 1924, Allen purchased Frank Wright's stake in the business. In 1925, Allen began franchising the root beer, while the franchisee added the other menu items and operated at their discretion. Most of the restaurants that opened under this scheme were on the highways of the Central Valley region, mainly for travelers. This may have arguably been the first successful food-franchising operation. Allen sold the company in 1950 and retired. A lot of World War I veterans eventually founded A&W franchises throughout the US, while some of their descendants still own franchises.

A&W's initial menu relied heavily on root beer and snacks, such as popcorn and peanuts, as well as sandwiches on sliced bread.

In 1927, J. Willard Marriott gained franchise rights for Washington, D.C., Baltimore and Richmond. Subsequently, he moved to Washington to open a root beer stand with Hugh Colton. These stands subsequently became Hot Shoppes, paving the way for the later creation of one of the largest hospitality corporations in the world. As of 1933, A&W had a total of 171 stands, increasing to 260 by 1941.

A&W survived the Great Depression and labor shortages during World War II but benefitted from the post-war recovery of the American economy, with fast food and drive-in restaurants beginning to take shape. The first franchise convention was held in La Crosse, Wisconsin in 1949, but was limited to Wisconsin franchisees.

=== Expansion ===
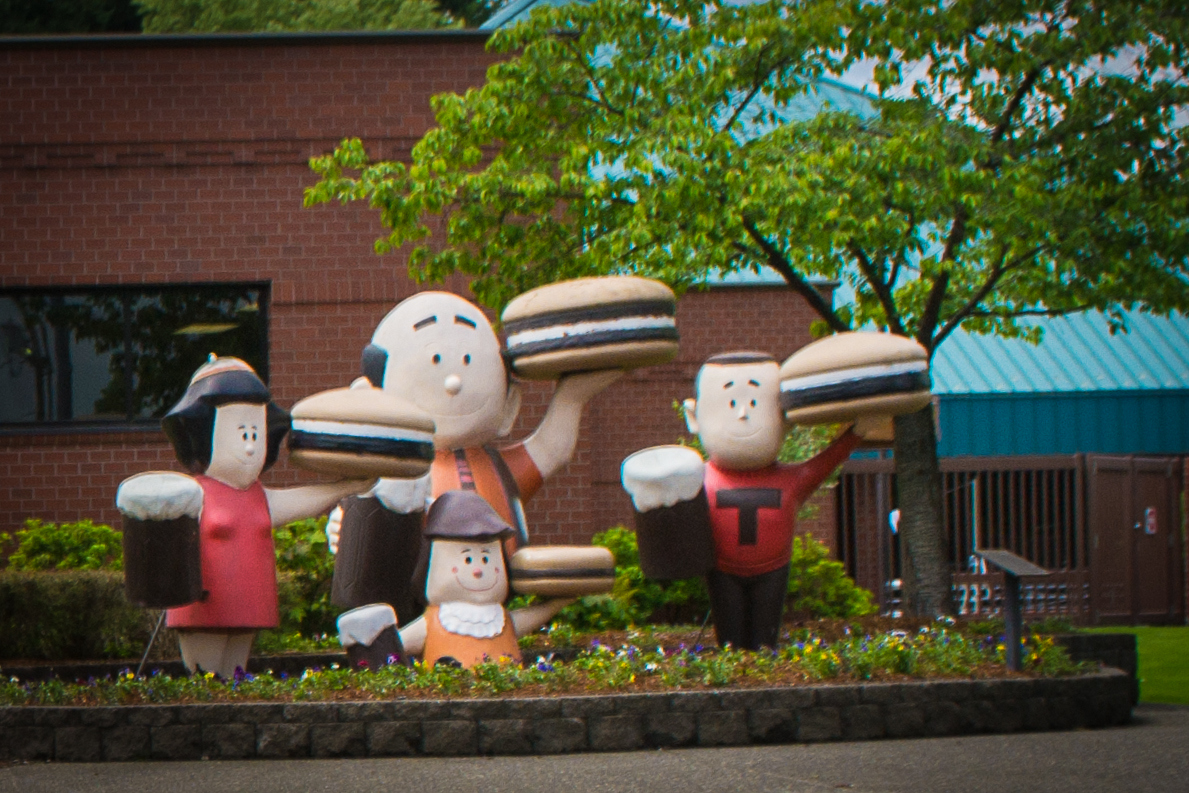
A 1950s A&W Burger Family display in Hillsboro, Oregon

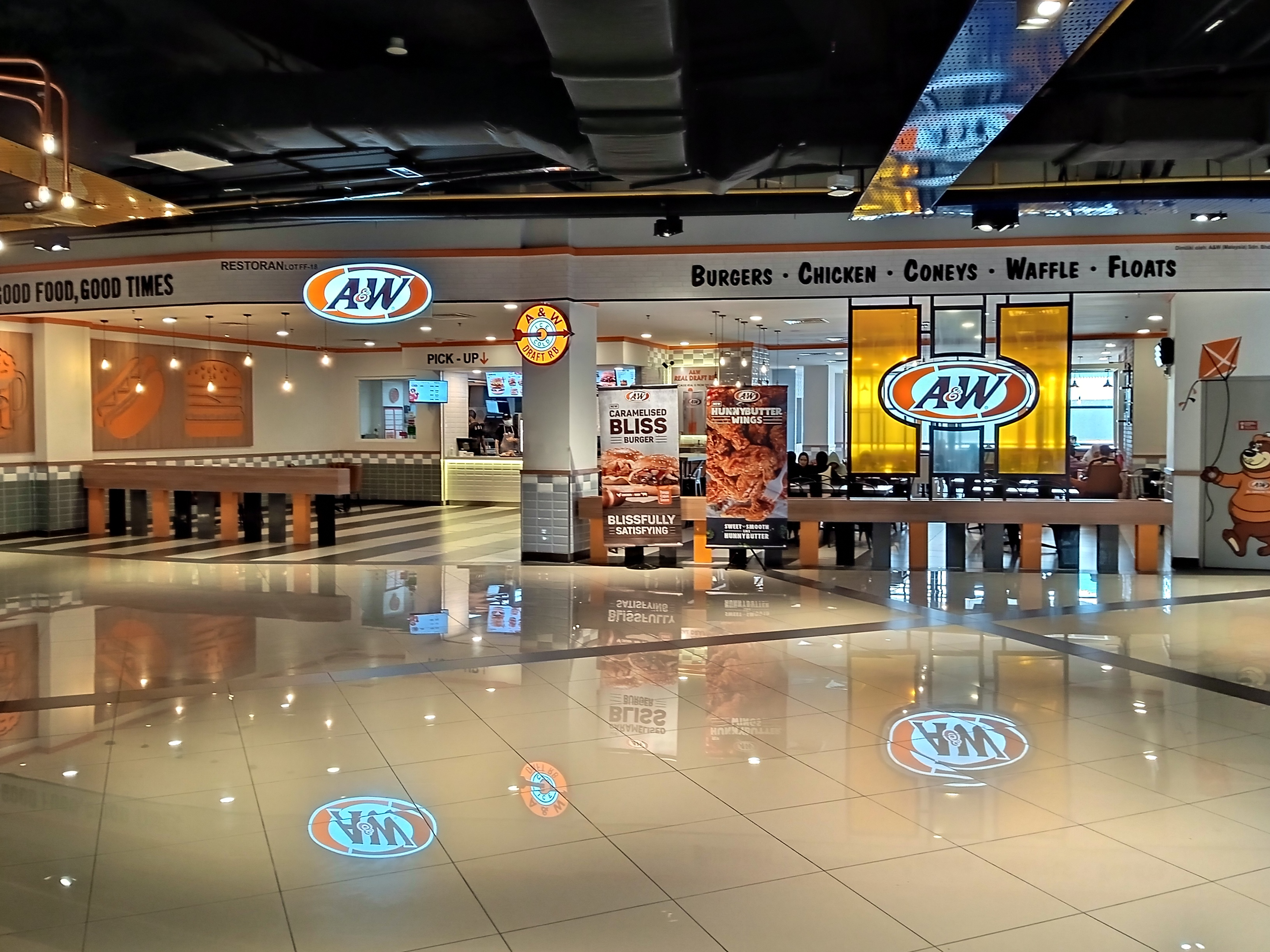
A&W Restaurant at the EkoCheras Mall, Kuala Lumpur, Malaysia

In the expansion years of the 1950s and 1960s, franchisees were signing 20- or 25-year contracts under the older model. The chain expanded into Canada in 1956, opening restaurants in Winnipeg and Montreal. By 1960, A&W had 2,000 restaurants. In November 1956, F. R. "Fran" Loetterle became the president of the chain.

In 1963, the chain opened its first store on Okinawa, which at the time was under American control. In the following years, the chain branched into other foreign markets, including Guam (first territory outside of the North American continent to open a restaurant, in 1961), opened by Scotty Moylan, Mexico, the Philippines (some sources say it opened in the 1990s) and Malaysia. The first restaurant in Malaysia (Malaya at the time) was opened on December 24 that year by Al and Geri Lieboff, a couple from Las Vegas, who got the franchising rights for Malaysia and Singapore. Setting up the chain seemed to be complicated, as they were unable to find a proper site, and in the recruitment process, Malayans had no consent to adorning Western "cabaret girl" style clothes. Already at the time of setup, kids were starting to favor chicken, burgers, and hot dogs rather than rice and curry, and within the next five years, would also see a rise in new locations up to 22 within five years.

The first restaurant in Europe opened in Mannheim (near Stuttgart), West Germany in 1962. At the time, a city influenced by US military presence, the restaurant was showing signs of success for its novelty, the first drive-in restaurant in Germany, and had already made headlines in German newspapers. At the time, it was the 2283rd overall founded by the chain. There were already plans to introduce restaurants and drive-ins in other key European markets, such as the United Kingdom, according to the chain's president.

Dale Mulder opened up a Lansing, Michigan A&W franchise in 1961. In 1963, Mulder added the bacon cheeseburger to his menu after a customer made repeated orders for bacon to be added to his cheeseburger. Thus A&W is credited with inventing the bacon cheeseburger.

=== United Fruit Co. and United Brands Company subsidiary ===
In 1963, the company was sold again, followed by another sale in 1967 to the United Fruit Co. conglomerate. AMK Corporation purchased United Fruit in 1970. Then AMK formed United Brands Company to hold A&W.

In 1971, A&W Beverages Inc.—a beverage subsidiary—began supplying bottled A&W products to grocery stores. The bottled products would become available nationally. In 1972, A&W's Canadian division was sold to Unilever.

A&W attempted to open restaurants in mainland Japan in the early 1970s, specifically in Fukuoka prefecture and the regions of Kanto and Kansai. The chain's performance on the mainland was sluggish in contrast to Okinawa due to several factors, such as the 1973 oil crisis, prompting the chain to withdraw from the market. A&W's Japanese operations are still handled from Okinawa. There were further fruitless attempts to bring the chain to the mainland: in the 1980s, the Okinawan branch briefly attempted to open restaurants in Kagoshima Prefecture but ended up limiting itself to Okinawa, while in the 2000s a pilot restaurant existed in Tokyo, which was quickly withdrawn.

1978 saw the introduction of a standard menu for use in all restaurants in the USA.

In the 1970s, A&W had more stores than McDonald's, with a peak in 1974 of 2,400 units. Oshkosh, Wisconsin, franchise manager Jim Brajdic said: "Problems back then, including a lawsuit, franchisee discontent, and inconsistencies in the operation, caused the chain to flounder and branches to close." A&W moved to a modern-style franchise agreement that introduced royalty payments and new standards. However, many franchisees refused the revised terms as their 20- or 25-year original agreements expired. In 1980, the number of restaurants had fallen to 1,300 in the United States (mostly in the Midwest and the North West), Asia, and Europe. In 1980, the Singaporean franchisee Temenggong Ltd. had increased the number of restaurants in the country, while nine new restaurants were planned in Malaysia. There were also plans to open restaurants in the Philippines and Hong Kong. Negotiations to sell the chain began in November 1981.

=== Taubman Investment Co. subsidiary ===
In 1982, A. Alfred Taubman purchased A&W and placed it under Taubman Investment Co. Taubman only purchased the restaurant company and not A&W Beverages. The chain dropped to fewer than 500 locations in the mid-1980s. A freeze on issuing franchises was put in place. Taubman wanted to restructure the chain by changing its "outdated" image. Franchisees were being neglected in the United Fruit phase. Taubman opted to withdraw agreements with 100 franchisees that were performing poorly and ousted 80% of its workforce. With this, the new management decided to split its fast-food restaurants into two units – the conventional orange roof A&W restaurants, which were still the majority, and A&W Great Food Restaurants.

In 1983, A&W opened its first restaurant in Thailand, at the Central Ladprao shopping mall in Bangkok.

In 1985, A&W began offering the Third Pounder to compete with McDonald's Quarter Pounder. As advertised, the Third beat the Quarter in taste tests and was less expensive by weight. In his 2007 memoir, former owner A. Alfred Taubman claimed research had revealed that it had been unsuccessful in part due to Americans' widespread innumeracy, specifically their inability to understand fractions: 1/3 was perceived as smaller than 1/4 (due to the smaller denominator) despite being a larger quantity. The burger was relaunched in 2021 as the 3/9 Pound burger, humorously attempting to capitalize on the now-popular fractions misunderstanding story.

In 1985, the chain struggled in Singapore, losing its relevance to newer, larger chains and its dominance in the fried chicken area to KFC. The chain was about to amp up its operations in the Asian region, with a possible launch in Hong Kong as well as three new restaurants in Thailand.

On April 21, 1985, its first restaurant opened in Indonesia, in the Melawai area of South Jakarta, its capital. Currently, Indonesia is the chain's largest international market, which as of February 2023 claimed 243 restaurants in 30 cities. A restaurant in Ximending, Taiwan opened on February 22, 1986. Its two units in Kuwait were closed in 1988 owing to security concerns. It was in Kuwait, during a US-Malaysia trip, that Kevin Bazner was held hostage in August 1990 when the plane he was on board was set for refueling; he was released in December.

Negotiations were held with Sonic Drive-In for a potential buying of the chain, but the plans fell in October 1986 due to a decline in franchises. Expansion plans were formulated in August 1987 with the opening of twenty new restaurants in a one-year period.

On March 6, 1988, the first conventional A&W outlet opened in the Philippines at Fiesta Carnival in Cubao, followed by a second at Gift Gate Center on November 26. The second restaurant's reputation was damaged by a fire of unknown origin that broke out in May 1990. Nonetheless, the chain expanded with new outlets and products by the end of 1990. The Philippine chain was the first A&W to introduce chicken nuggets, a product that even the American operations wanted from there. The chain also sponsored a team in the Philippine Basketball League, which they withdrew in 1992.

==== A&W Great Food Restaurants ====
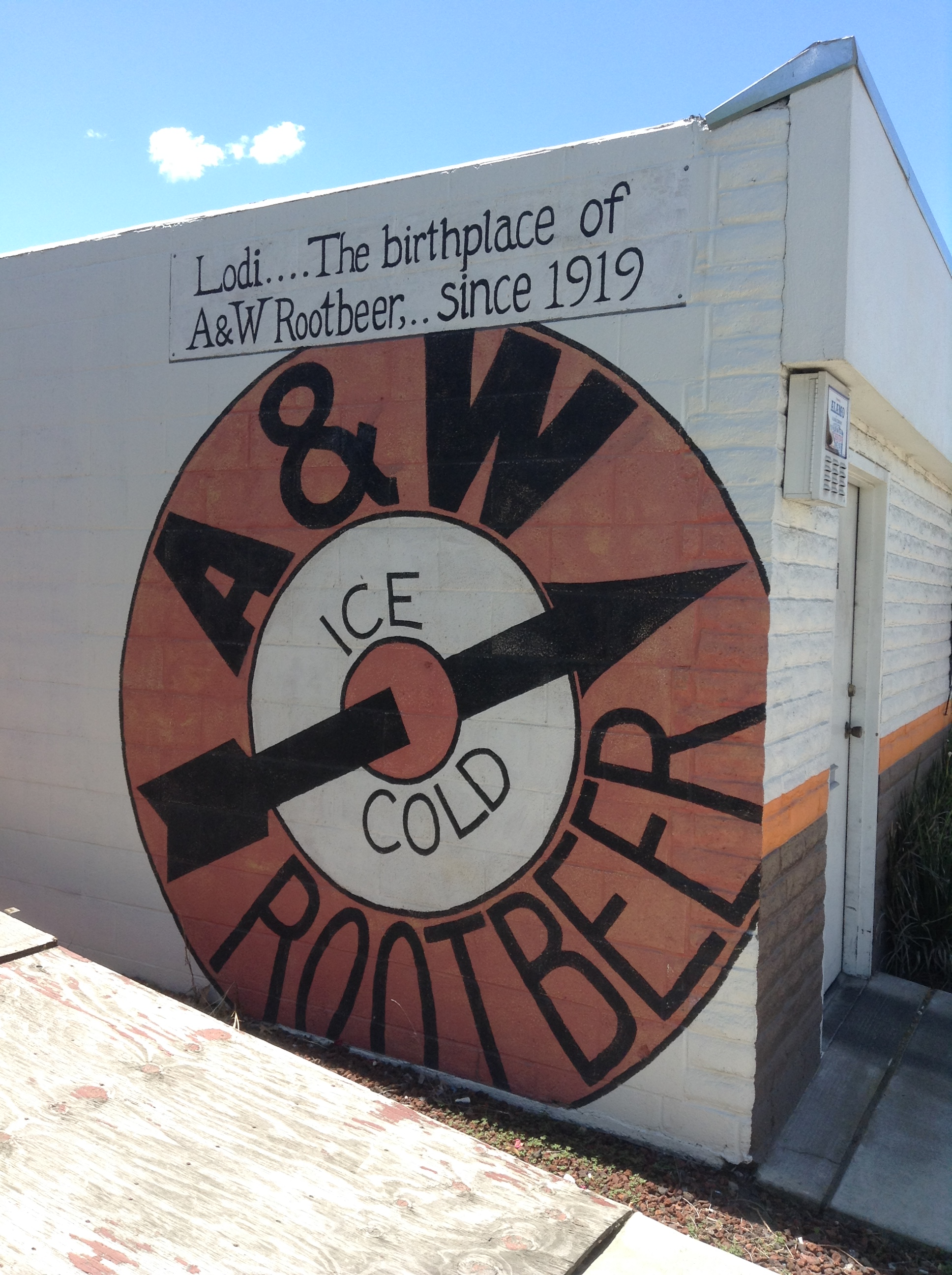
Lodi the birthplace of A&W Root Beer since 1919

A new format concept, A&W Great Food Restaurants, was developed. Ten corporate-owned locations were opened to test the concept: a sit-down, upscale, family-theme restaurant with a large salad bar and homemade ice cream. The first such branch opened in 1978 (1979, according to some sources) at the Lake Forest Shopping Mall in Gaithersburg, Maryland. Emphasis in these restaurants was made on low-calorie foods that covered almost the entirety of the foods found in the fast-food spectrum, except pizza. By 1986, there were plans to have 250 to 300 locations within ten years.

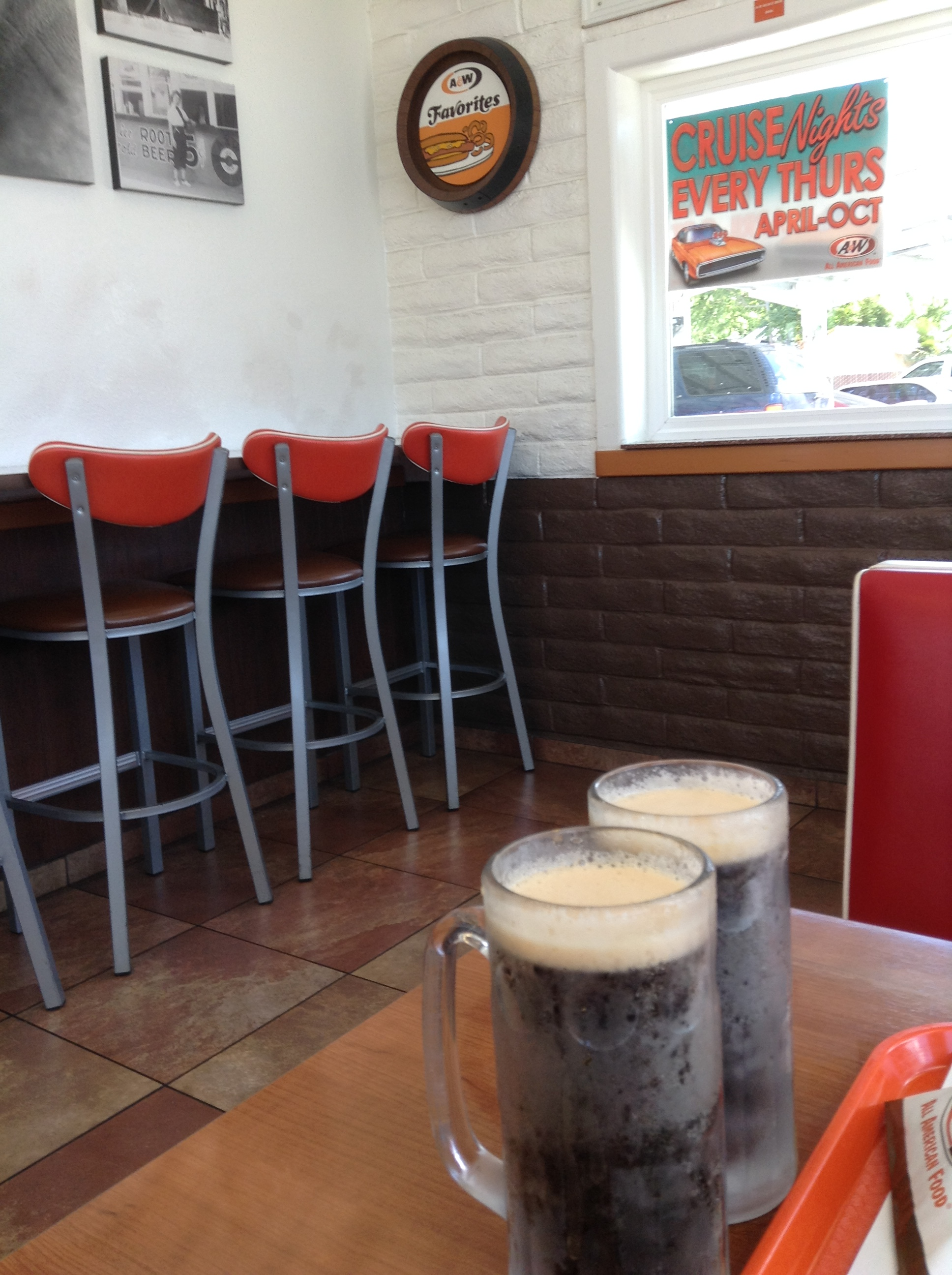
A&W Root Beer and restaurant in Lodi, California

In 1987, the company was headquartered in Livonia, Michigan, and Mulder became CEO and president. The freeze was lifted, and a push occurred in 1986, adding 60 franchise units. In March 1989, A&W made an agreement with Minnesota-based Carousel Snack Bars to convert that chain's 200 stores (mostly kiosks in shopping malls) to A&W Hot Dogs & More, Some A&W Hot Dogs & More are still operating. aiming to finish the conversion within two years. In the same year, A&W bought the Burger City chain, converting its nine drive-thru kiosks to A&W units.

George E. Michel, who had worked with the Canadian chain for twenty years, was appointed president of the American A&W Restaurants in January 1991, becoming CEO in January 1992. His presidency used its long history as a pretext for nostalgia both in the United States and abroad.

=== Sale to Sidney Feltenstein; Grotech subsidiary ===
In December 1994, Taubman sold A&W to Sidney Feltenstein, with the aim of pushing the chain's international expansion further, while still maintaining its headquarters in Livonia. At the time, there were 790 restaurants (688 in the United States and 102 abroad), with the bulk of the international locations located in Malaysia, Thailand and Japan, as well as in Mexico and the United Arab Emirates. Earlier in 1994, its hundredth international location opened at a tourist attraction in Bangkok: a crocodile farm. In January 1995, operations were taken over by Grotech Capital Partners, for a sum of $20 million, with Feltenstein as the chain's new CEO.

An agreement was signed in 1996 with Walmart to provide restaurants in seven locations. The menu would add items depending on the region, with the rest being its standard fare. That year, its restaurants were renovated to feature an aesthetic referred to by Feltenstein as "contemporary nostalgia". The move mirrored that of Dairy Queen, which had also opened a test location with a similar feel. A&W also operated restaurants in Monterrey, a key city in northern Mexico. In 1997, A&W acquired Carousel Snack Bars, including its 175 units in malls. The agreement made the chain the owner of these units, while continuing to franchise restaurants.

The chain aimed to increase its presence in the second half of 1996 by opening co-branded locations and nontraditional sites such as gas stations, while abroad it planned an increase in the number of units, having signed development agreements in Oman and had already opened stores in Dubai. There were also plans for the opening of units in Seoul and increasing its presence in Singapore, as well as attempting to target the Latin American market. For the Middle East, it made a licensing comeback after approximately a decade, after leaving the market in the late 80s due to political uncertainties. In early 1997, it announced the opening of locations in colleges and universities. The chain relocated its corporate headquarters to Farmington Hills on March 30, 1998. As part of an $80 million expansion plan, there were plans to open 500 restaurants in two years and close 100 outdated restaurants. A new location, which had previously housed an A&W site in Fargo from 1971 to 1980, opened in mid-March 1997 as a pilot restaurant for a new design to be implemented in new locations.

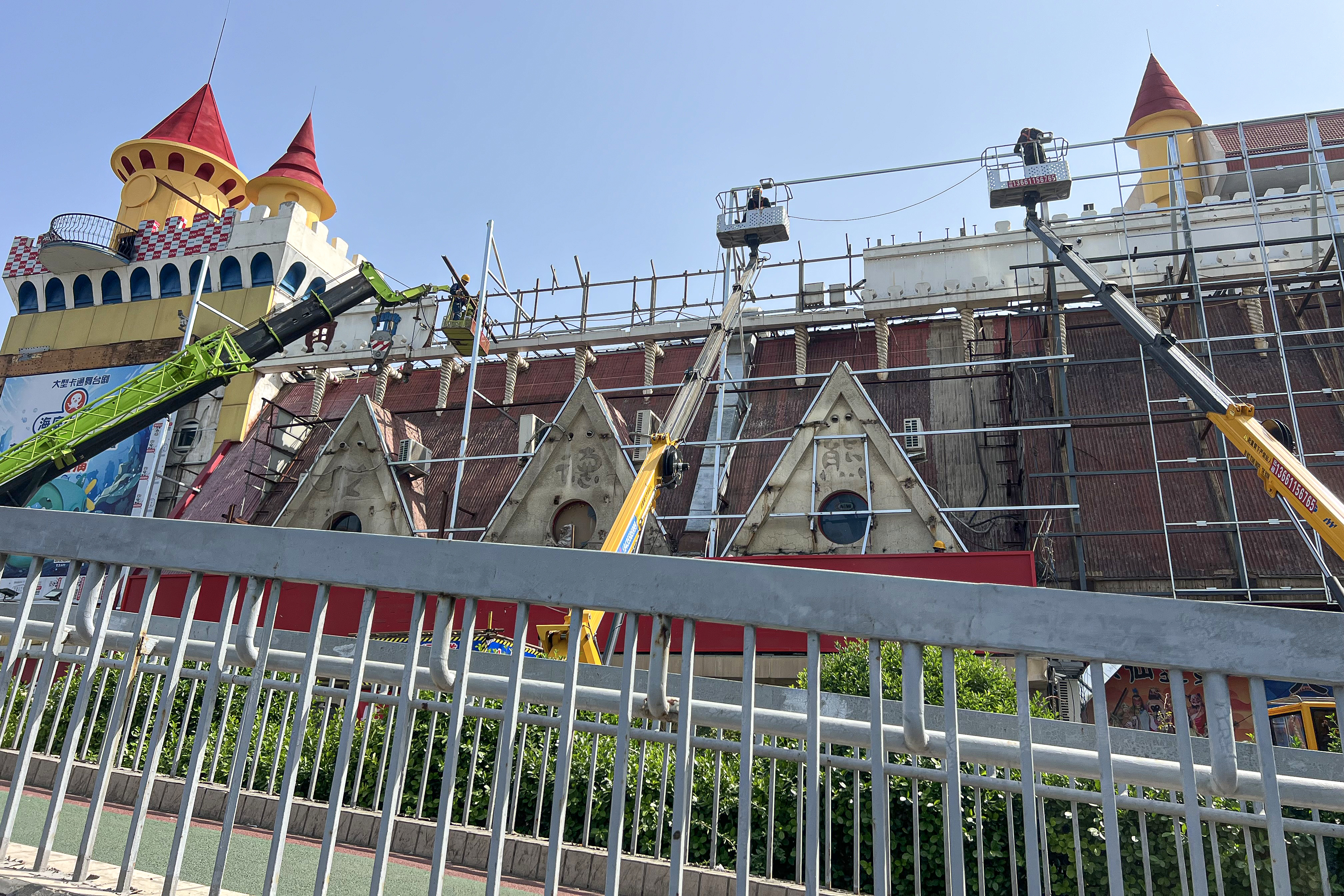
Remains of a former A&W restaurant at the Beijing Puppet Art Theatre, April 2024

A&W entered the mainland Chinese market in 1996, the franchisee for the country being Aidewei, and had eight restaurants in Beijing. Later, due to arrears of franchise fees since 2000, Aidewei lost the A&W trademark in 2002. The eight restaurants weren't operating well and were plagued by mismanagement. An outlet in Yansha with 140 seats in a crowded, strategic location turned out to have limited business, while the restaurant in Anzhen had few customers. Following the buyout of the parent chain by Yum! Brands in 2002, it was announced in March 2003 that negotiations with Aidewei had broken down, leading to the franchisee's bankruptcy that same year. The restaurants closed successively from October 2002 to September 2003. The "father of American fast food", as dubbed by the Chinese press, didn't convince the local culture and tastes, especially with the rise of local fast food. There were also concerns about the Chinese branch operating without authorization, refusing to pay franchise fees since September 2000.

In 1997 a small A&W restaurant opened in Festivalgate in Osaka, offering standard A&W fare. The restaurant closed in 1999.

The first Qatari restaurant opened on December 18, 1997 (Qatar's National Day) with Al-Muftah Group as the franchisee. There were also plans to open a second restaurant in the country, as well as two restaurants in Cairo and six more in the UAE during 1998. The fare was similar to most A&W restaurants, with the addition of local items. At the end of the month, it opened a unit in Seoul (owned by 2F Enterprises) and one in Brunei (owned by a subfranchise of A&W Singapore). As of June 1998, A&W only had two restaurants in Mexico. The Cairo branch opened on August 1, 1998, under local franchise American Egyptian Foreign Investments, with Egypt becoming the seventeenth country outside of the United States to open a location.

The first co-branded A&W restaurant, tied with Mexican food chain Amigos, opened in Lincoln in 1997. There were plans to increase the amount of co-branded locations across Nebraska by four in the second half of 1998. The goal of the co-branded restaurant was to allure more customers who did not prefer Mexican food. On March 16, 1999, it announced the opening of a restaurant in Dhaka with franchisee Global Supplies Limited due in September that year, with four more planned. The restaurant in Lodi took part in a world record for the largest root beer float of 2562.5 gallons on June 19, 1999, the eve of the eightieth anniversary of the chain. That same year, the chain attempted to enter the Korean market by finding local partners, aiming to grow in the Korean market in the first half of 2000. The plan was ultimately shelved.

A&W merged with Long John Silver's to form Yorkshire Global Restaurants based in Lexington, Kentucky in March 1999. Kevin Bazner was promoted president of the chain in July. In 2000, Yorkshire agreed to test multi-branded locations with Tricon Global Restaurants. A grocery location opened in February that year in Idaho. By March 2002, the Yorkshire-Tricon multi-branding test consisted of 83 KFC/A&Ws, six KFC/Long John Silver's, and three Taco Bell/Long John Silver's and was considered successful by the companies.

In December 2000, A&W announced new openings in less conventional locations, such as casinos, airports, gas stations, convention centers and convenience stores, for 2001, as part of its growth plans. At the time, the chain had more than 1,000 locations in 47 states and over 200 international locations in 14 countries. The chain around the time emphasized its aesthetics on "contemporized nostalgia". It also saw a success in co-branded restaurants, following the success of a trial in Butte in 1998, which, owing to its success, in the spring of 2000 led to the announcement of the opening of 300 joint KFC-A&W restaurants by 2005.

Tricon bought both A&W and LJS in March 2002, shortly before the merger with Yorkshire was finalized.

=== Yum! Brands subsidiary ===
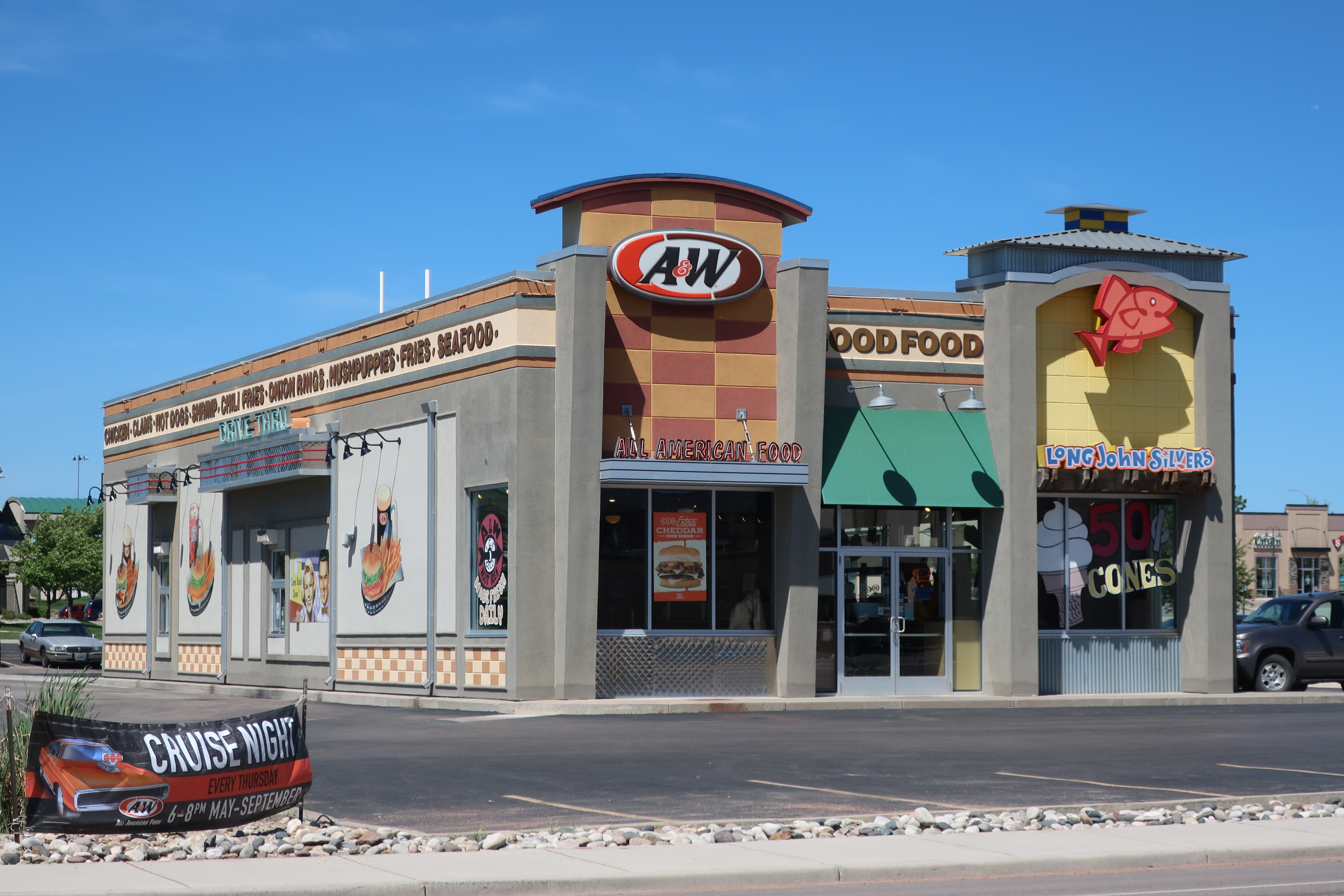
A co-branded A&W and Long John Silver's in Gillette, Wyoming.

In March 2002, Yorkshire merged with Tricon Global Restaurants to form Yum! Brands. A few weeks later, Malaysian company KUB took over the franchises in Southeast Asia, aiming to restore its prestige in Malaysia alone and increasing its market share. Subsequently, in January 2003, Yum! announced that A&W and Long John Silver's would move their operational base from Lexington to Louisville, as operating the chains from Lexington was considered "impractical and cost-inefficient", preferring to operate all of its chains from Louisville. Under Yum's management, A&W added franchises with a nostalgic look and modern technology. They have a carhop design with drive-thrus, and some have picnic tables. The chain didn't seek to compete against McDonald's, instead preferring to carve up its own niche. 2004 saw the return of the Papa Burger brand at a restaurant in Dayton - the Burger Family brand originally retired in the United States in the 1980s, being replaced by the Deluxe Burgers - and was the only name of the old line that was reinstated, with the other burgers having new names.

In September 2001 the Singapore branch was taken over by KUB, who also oversaw the restaurants in Malaysia. At the time of takeover, it had twelve restaurants, but by November 2002, the number had dwindled to eight. Its restaurants had already been downgraded: the Ang Mo Kio restaurant shut down, the Tampines restaurant refused to repair its air conditioning systems, and cable TV was switched off in all outlets. Food sales had decreased by about 5-12%. The chain quit the Philippine market in 2004 owing to several factors: lack of interest in its standard fare, lack of interest among locals, expensive cost and a general sense of unfamiliarity with local palates. The chain failed to adapt to local tastes and quietly shut down in the summer of 2004.

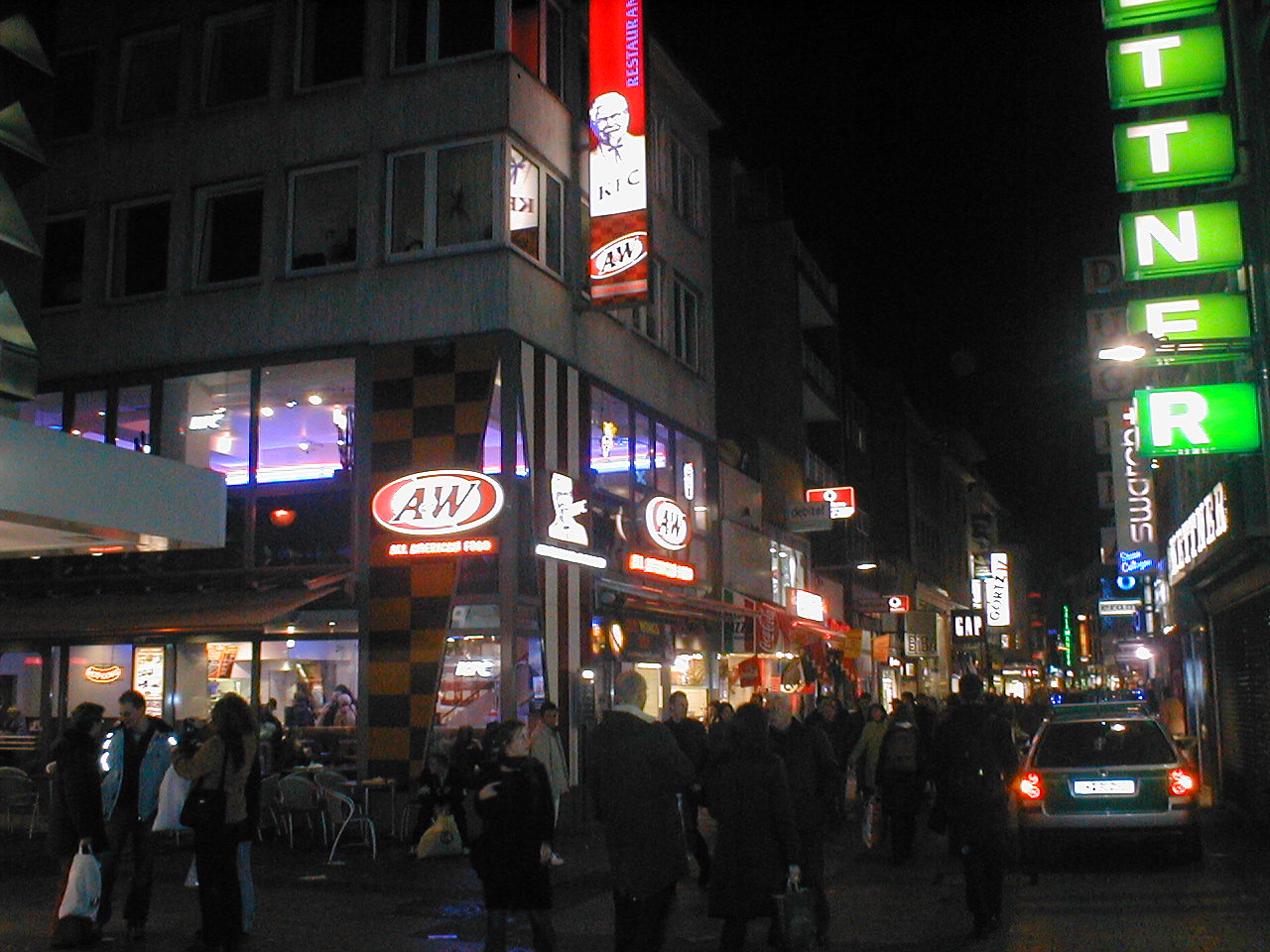
Joint KFC/A&W restaurant in Cologne, Germany, in November 2003

The chain attempted to enter large European markets thanks to joints with KFC. In Germany the first non-military A&W restaurant opened in Garbsen near Hanover on May 27, 2003 followed by a second in Cologne in July. A third in Berlin was scheduled for early September.

A&W opened its first outlet in Bangladesh on December 15, 2004. The outlet reportedly closed in 2024. Indonesia hit a record milestone, as the hundredth restaurant opened in Bintaro Utama on October 20, 2004. By the end of 2004, all A&W restaurants in the Philippines were closed.

Most A&W stores that opened in the U.S. during Yum!'s ownership were co-branded with another of Yum!'s chains—Long John Silver's, Pizza Hut, Taco Bell, or KFC.

In 2009, its operations in Southeast Asia were in a mixed situation. Operations in Indonesia and Bangladesh were thriving, while the restaurants in Thailand and Malaysia were facing uncertainties. The Malaysian franchisee KUB planned to increase the number of restaurants to 60, up from 37 in 2012, despite net losses of $1.5 million. For its 90th anniversary, A&W announced an expansion plan to open fifteen new drive-ins in a concept the chain dubbed "Three-D Drive In: Drive-In, Drive-Through, Dine-In". Growth was more expeted in the states of Wisconsin, Michigan and Oregon, where some of these Three-D units were set up in 2008.

=== A Great American Brand LLC ===
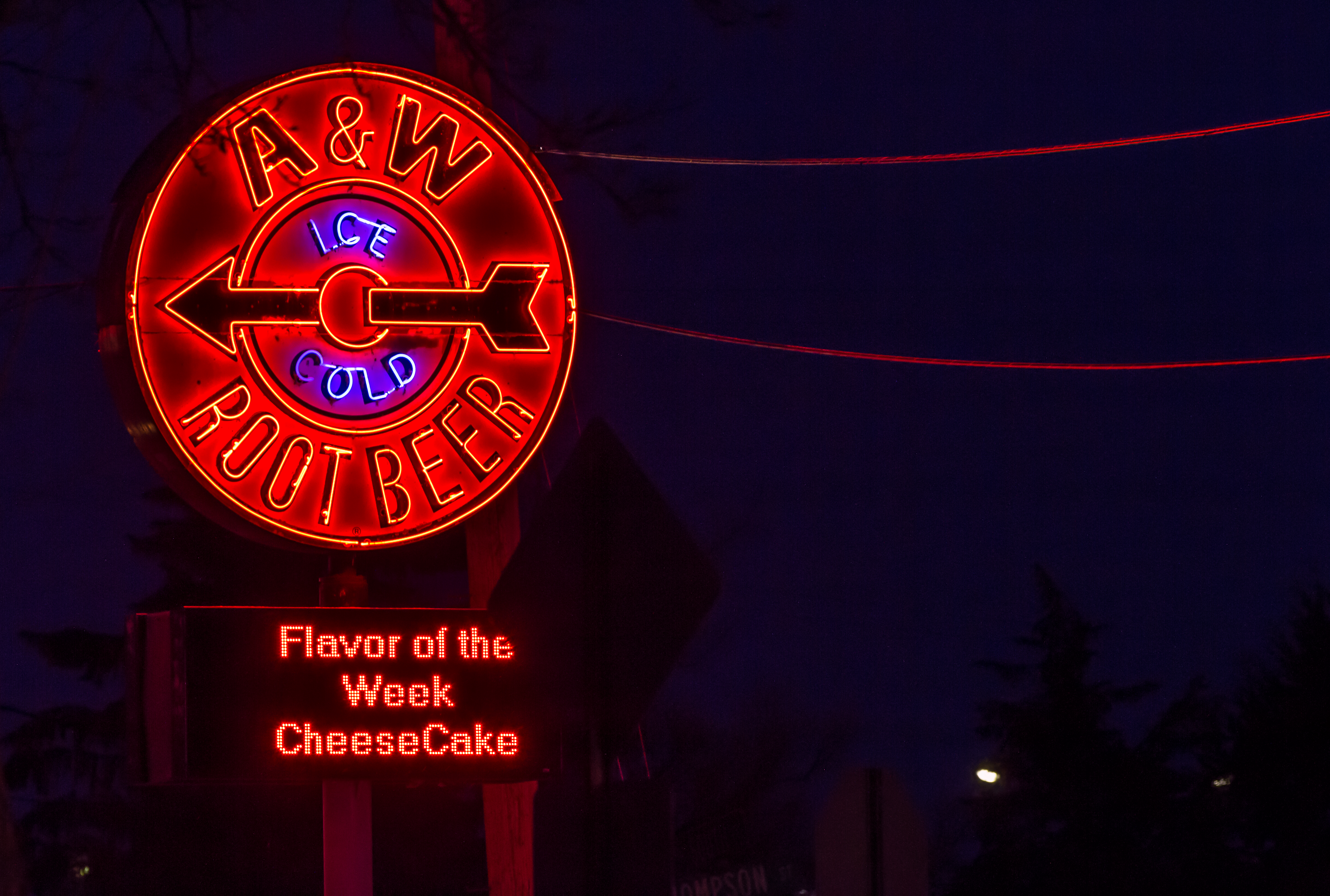
A&W Ice Cold Root Beer Restaurant Neon Sign - La Crosse, Wisconsin in 2016

In January 2011, Yum! Brands announced its intention to sell A&W along with Long John Silver's. Citing poor sales for both divisions and overshadowing by its other chains, Yum! planned to focus on international expansion for its remaining brands, with particular emphasis on growth in China. In September 2011, Yum! announced that it would sell the chain to A Great American Brand, a consortium of various A&W franchisees in the United States and overseas. The sale was finalized on December 19, 2011, under the leadership of returning CEO Kevin M. Bazner. Administration of A Great American Brand was divided between the national A&W franchisee association, the largest overseas franchisee and Bazner. With the purchase, A&W relocated its headquarters back to Lexington, employing a staff of 30 in late 2011, aiming to double to 60 within a five-year period while setting a growth target after that. Potential targets for growth were going to be small towns, as well as non-conventional locations, such as shopping malls, airports and universities. The chain had 1,200 restaurants at the time, 850 of which were in the US, with the remaining primarily in Asia. The chain, instead of competing heavily against larger chains, continued to rely on its core strength, smaller cities and towns of the USA.

In early 2013, A&W introduced its first new product in several years: a six-ounce version of its soft-serve blended dessert treat. Mini Polar Swirls were the first product to be launched on Vine. The following summer, 250 of A&W's restaurants began hand-breading their chicken tenders, moving towards higher-quality menu items and expanding their chicken category. In April 2014, the Hand-Breaded Chicken Tender Texas Toast Sandwich was added to the menu as a limited-time offering, along with a campaign to create the world's longest branded hashtag. In June 2014, A&W launched two new flavors of its Polar Swirl dessert treat: Sour Patch Kids and Nutter Butter.

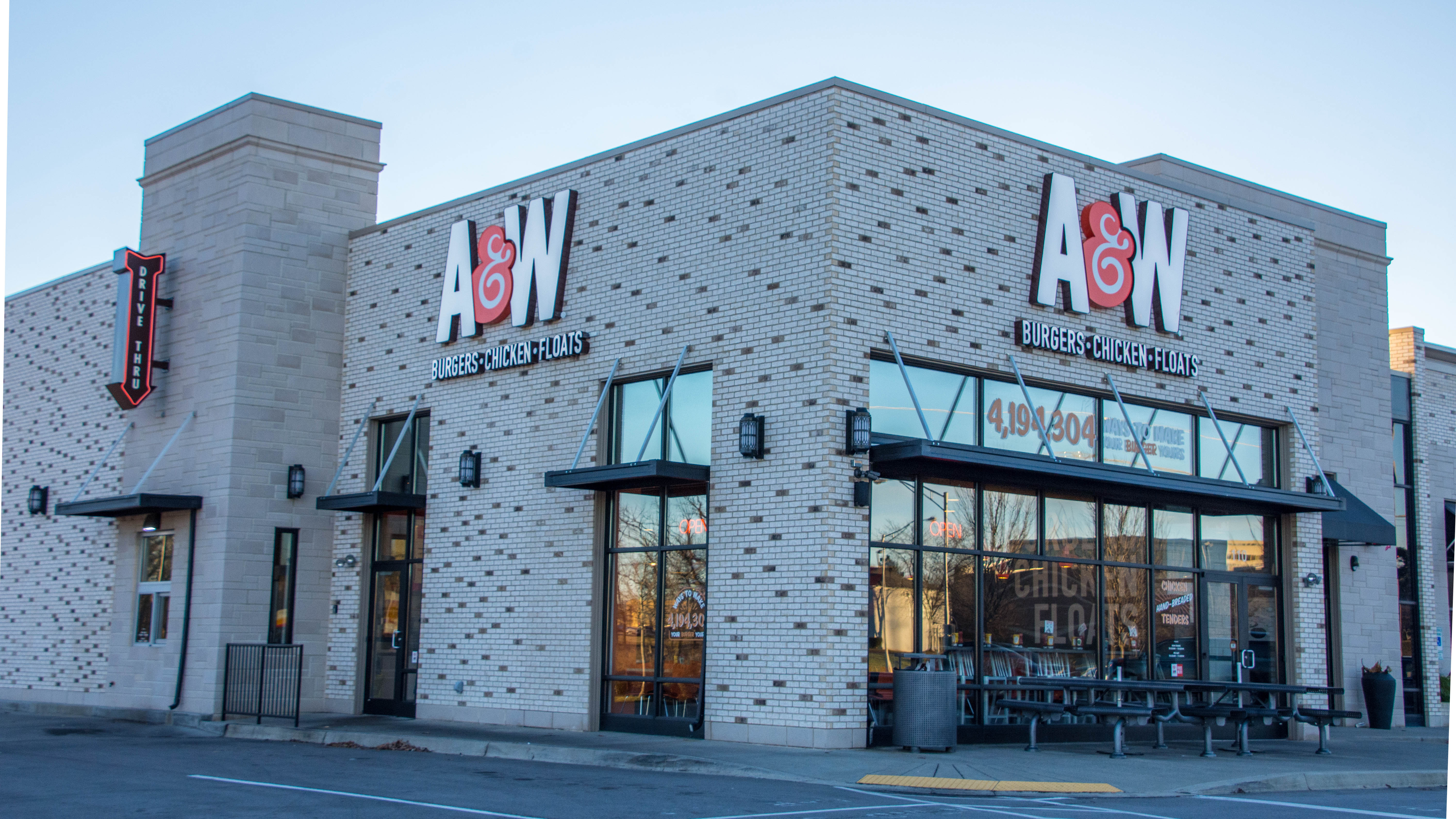
A&W Burgers Chicken Floats in Lexington, Kentucky in 2017

In October 2013, A&W opened its first new concept restaurant, A&W Burgers Chicken Floats. The new concept focuses on fresh made-to-order food and heavily emphasizes customer service. The menu features burgers made with fresh beef and a choice of toppings, hand-breaded chicken tenders, all-beef hot dogs, and several sides. The new management gave A&W a significant boost in the number of locations, with 2017 scheduled to have more openings than closures.

For 2018, A&W projected an increase in its franchising operations and opening new restaurants.

In April 2019, A&W returned to Singapore after a 16-year absence, its first location being at Jewel Changi Airport.

In June 2019, the A&W chain started moving its headquarters to the University of Kentucky Coldstream Research Campus in 2019.

A&W announced in March 2022 that it was going to withdraw from the Thai market due to economic losses. The restaurants shut down on March 20.

A franchise was given to western New York in early 2023, with three locations, the first of which in Niagara Falls, set to open between May and June of that year.

There are nearly 1,000 A&W Restaurants worldwide that are owned or franchised through A Great American Brand, with approximately 475 of these restaurants located in the U.S. as of October 2024.

A&W rebounded its profits in the first half of 2024, emphasis on its growth is given mainly to single-brand restaurants, as well as restaurants in less conventional locations. In November 2024, the chain announced its entrance to the Milwaukee and Madison markets in Wisconsin.

Betsy Schmandt took over the role of A&W's CEO and president from Kevin Bazner on March 4, 2025; Bazner continues as a chairman. Her strategy centers on "newstalgia", in an attempt at increasing the brand's relevance with younger people, by improving its marketing, as well as offering a more consistent brand identity, as well as more consistent operations. In April, an agreement was signed to open three restaurants in the Memphis metropolitan area, with the first of the three locations, the one in Millington, scheduled to open by the end of 2025.

In August 2026, the chain unveiled a prototype for a new restaurant design, as well as the introduction of the first proper chicken sandwich it has ever sold, following a years-long development process. Previous to the new crispy chicken sandwich, A&W's chicken sandwiches and sliders were created with their chicken strips.

== Operations ==
A&W is the only major fast-food chain in the United States to be owned entirely by franchisees since the 2011 sale from Yum! Brands to A Great American Brand, LLC., which is mostly under the control of the National A&W Franchisee Association (NAWFA). The current owners rely heavily on single-brand restaurants, in contrast to combined, co-branded restaurants, which came from prior administrations. As of December 2021, there were 900 restaurants in the US and Asia. In the United States alone, the states with the most restaurants are California, followed by Wisconsin and Michigan. As of year-end 2023, A&W has 455 franchised restaurants in the US market alone. The number of co-branded locations has been on the decline with 243 such units. As of January 2025, A&W has made it to the Franchise 500 list for six consecutive years, standing at 210th place in the 2024 ranking. The number of restaurants in the United States and in Asia is almost equiparable, with the chain steadily decreasing its number of units in the United States and increasing elsewhere, a trend that has been following since 2015.

=== Countries with A&W franchises ===
==== Current ====
Country/region	Year entered	Outlets	First outlet	Owner/major operator	Notes
United States	1919	455	Lodi, California	A Great American Brand, LLC.	
Cuba	2004	1	Guantanamo Bay Naval Base		Military location under US jurisdiction; co-branded with KFC and Taco Bell inside the Marble Head Lanes Bowling Center
Bahrain		1	Naval Support Activity Bahrain		Military location under US jurisdiction
Japan	1963	24			Available only in Okinawa Prefecture. First fast food restaurant in Okinawa (before the 1972 reversion agreement) and in the current territory of Japan (considering current borders).
Malaysia	1963	53	Jalan Tuanku Abdul Rahman, Kuala Lumpur	MUI Group	First fast food chain in Malaysia.
Singapore	2019		Jewel Changi Airport	A Great American Brand	Previously available in Singapore between 1966 and 2003, when it closed due to mismanagement from previous franchisee KUB.
Indonesia	1985		Melawai, Jakarta		

==== Former ====
Country/region	Year existed	Owner/major operator	Notes
Canada	1956–1972		Canadian operations were sold to Unilever in 1972, and continues to operate as an independent chain under A&W Food Services of Canada.
Guam	1961–	Scotty Moylan	First location outside of North America
West Germany	1962–		Military-centric locations with appeal to locals, opened in Mannheim in 1962.
Mexico	1963–		Little information known, it had restaurants in 1963; some information is known about there being two restaurants in Monterrey in the 90s.
Thailand	1983–2022	Nippon Pack Thailand	Opened in 1983 at the Central Ladprao mall. Closed in March 2022 after Nippon Pack refused to find a buyer for the franchise.
Kuwait	–1988		Closed in 1988 due to security concerns.
Taiwan	1986–		
Philippines	1988–2004	Hataw	Closed in 2004 due to declining sales.
United Arab Emirates			Operational before 1994
China	1996–2003	Adway	
Qatar	1997–		
Brunei	1998–	A&W Singapore	Singaporean subfranchise. As of 2025, the current Malaysian franchisee (PMC) plans to launch a restaurant in Brunei as part of its plans for Sabah and Sarawak.
Egypt	1998–	American Egyptian Foreign Investment	
Saudi Arabia	–2006		Operational before 2004, closed around 2006
United Arab Emirates			Operational before 1994
Germany	2003–		Civilian restaurants. Three restaurants opened in 2003–2004 as joint KFC-A&Ws. These later closed.
United Kingdom	2003–		Test run inside KFC restaurants
Australia	2003–		Test run inside LJS restaurants
Pakistan	2004–		
Bangladesh	2004–2022	Global Supplies	Franchise awarded 1999 and began operations in December 2004.

==== Entry considered but later withdrawn ====
Country/region	Year pondered	Owner/major operator	Notes
Hong Kong	1980; 1985		Entrance considered under British rule, first in 1980 and again in 1985.
South Korea	1997–1999	2F Enterprises	
Myanmar	2016–2017	Nippon Pack	Part of the Thai franchise; A&W wanted to enter the Burmese market to expand its business. Talks of an entry took place in 2017 but later collapsed.
Laos	2016	Nippon Pack	Part of the Thai franchise, entry considered.
Vietnam	2017	Nippon Pack	Part of the Thai franchise, talks with A Great American Brand to expand Nippon Pack's franchise area to Vietnam were due to take place in 2017.

== Advertising ==
A&W does not advertise nationally because of the lack of restaurants in certain parts of the United States. Its first attempt at doing a national television commercial was on June 16, 1969, when it booked for a slot on NBC's Monday Night at the Movies to advertise take-home gallons of root beer.

In 1976, A&W Restaurants participated in the Easter Seals Telethon, where money from large root beer mugs was collected by the local restaurant on behalf of the TV station broadcasting the telethon in the area.

In 1997, the chain adopted All American Food as its slogan in order to achieve widespread brand recognition. The chain increased its marketing budget in February 2000, eyeing for a new line of burgers in January 2001.

For the summer of 2007, the chain launched the Moove to American campaign, which was created to counter competing chains relying exclusively on foreign beef; the campaign started on June 28 with a stunt featuring 35 cows sent on a barge to the Statue of Liberty. The aim was to petition the National Cattlemen's Beef Association to support consumption of U.S. beef. There was also a campaign to set up a new custom burger, with the winner heading over to Louisville to work for its serving in restaurants.

A grassroots partnership with Green Bay Packers receiver Greg Jennings began in 2009, where Papa Burgers were sold at a price of 85 cents in Green Bay restaurants if Jennings made a touchdown. Due to its success, the campaign expanded to include all of Wisconsin in 2010. Jennings was also appointed as a pitchman for Wisconsin even outside the specialized burger promotion, in a contract signed on October 1, 2009; in exchange, A&W donated $10,000 to The Greg Jennings Foundation.

In January 2013, A&W Restaurants appointed Lexington-based advertising agency Cornett Integrated Marketing as its new agency of record. The contract was renewed in January 2024.

In January 2019, ahead of its hundredth anniversary, A&W removed the ampersand from its logo as part of a tongue-in-cheek campaign to bring back the ampersand to the alphabet as its 27th letter.

Beginning in October 2020, in order to recoup economic losses from the closure of several of its restaurants, A&W set up a series of quizzes on its website. For Halloween that year, it released a web stunt called The Onion Ring, a parody of The Ring.

A&W unveiled a new campaign in 2024, capitalizing on the ampersand of its logo and the tagline Burgers, Floats & Then Some. Packaging was also changed accordingly.

=== Collectors' Mug and free floats ===
The first time A&W Restaurants offered a day of free root beer floats was in 2004; under the old management, it was held on June 20, the date of A&W's anniversary, though it is unknown if it donated the proceeds, unlike the current administration. Mid-year, A&W announces the following year's Collectors' Mug, which has a single design for each year. In 2005, it had a full-color image of The Great Root Bear printed on it. By 2010, the event had changed to August 6. It was the chain's first attempt at a digital promotion, where users who liked its Facebook page would receive a digital coupon to redeem a free float.

A&W supports Disabled American Veterans and, since 2013, collects funds for it on National Root Beer Float Day, which is observed on August 6. Donation figures for 2019 were of a record $175,000. In the 2000s it was held in June and was known as National Float Day.

== Mascots ==
The roadside sign in front of the Middlebury, Vermont, location featuring the bear

In the 1960s, a character named Chubby Chicken appeared on all Chubby burgers.

In 1963, A&W introduced four choices of hamburgers and their corresponding Burger Family members: Papa Burger, Mama Burger, Teen Burger, and Baby Burger. Each burger had a wrapper featuring a cartoon image of the corresponding character.

The chain in the United States also used Dennis the Menace as a bespoke mascot in the 1960s, with special comics for the restaurants appearing mainly in print advertising.

A Rooty (Great Root Bear) statue at the Wittenberg, Wisconsin location in 1988

Rooty, the Great American Root Bear, originated as a prototype mascot in kids' meals in the US, but it was in Canada in 1974 that it gained further recognition, as a counter to the Ronald McDonald character of McDonald's and first appeared in the United States and in Asia shortly afterwards. However, the character's introduction was almost aborted when marketing received focus group research results that reported a poor reaction to him. In reaction, the marketing director, acting on instinct about the appeal of the character, ordered the researcher to return to Toronto with the cover story that he never presented the report. The researcher complied, and Rooty was presented to the franchisees as is. Rooty proved a popular marketing success. Rooty's adoption implied the phasing out of the Burger Family and the renaming of almost all of the burgers in the line outside of Canada.

Throughout the 1970s, '80s, and '90s, Rooty was the face of A&W, both the bottled drinks and the restaurant chain, on television and print advertising. His presence all but disappeared in the late 1990s, but in 2011, under A Great American Brand's ownership, Rooty came out of retirement. He has since been featured in print ads, on A&W's website, as the voice of their official Twitter account, and in a variety of YouTube and Vine videos. A bronze statue of the bear was erected at the lobby of the current headquarters. In 2013, Rooty became the first mascot to have an official LinkedIn profile, which was quickly shut down as Rooty was not considered "real" by the authorities at Linkedin.

The mascot made national headlines on January 24, 2023, when a parody tweet referencing the M&M's controversy was posted to its social media profiles, showing Rooty wearing pants, claiming that the mascot's lack of pants was "polarizing". Outrage started emerging from conservative sectors, including Fox News (the report also aired on sister network Fox Business), claiming it to be real. In a follow-up tweet, A&W said that the announcement was a joke. Spokesperson Liz Bazner said that the initial post was "purely in jest" and that A&W has no plans to change Rooty's outfit.

In March 1998, the characters from the comic strip Blondie, including Blondie and Dagwood Bumstead, were licensed for use at A&W franchises as part of an "All American Food" campaign. A tie-in burger was scheduled for July that year.

== Gallery ==
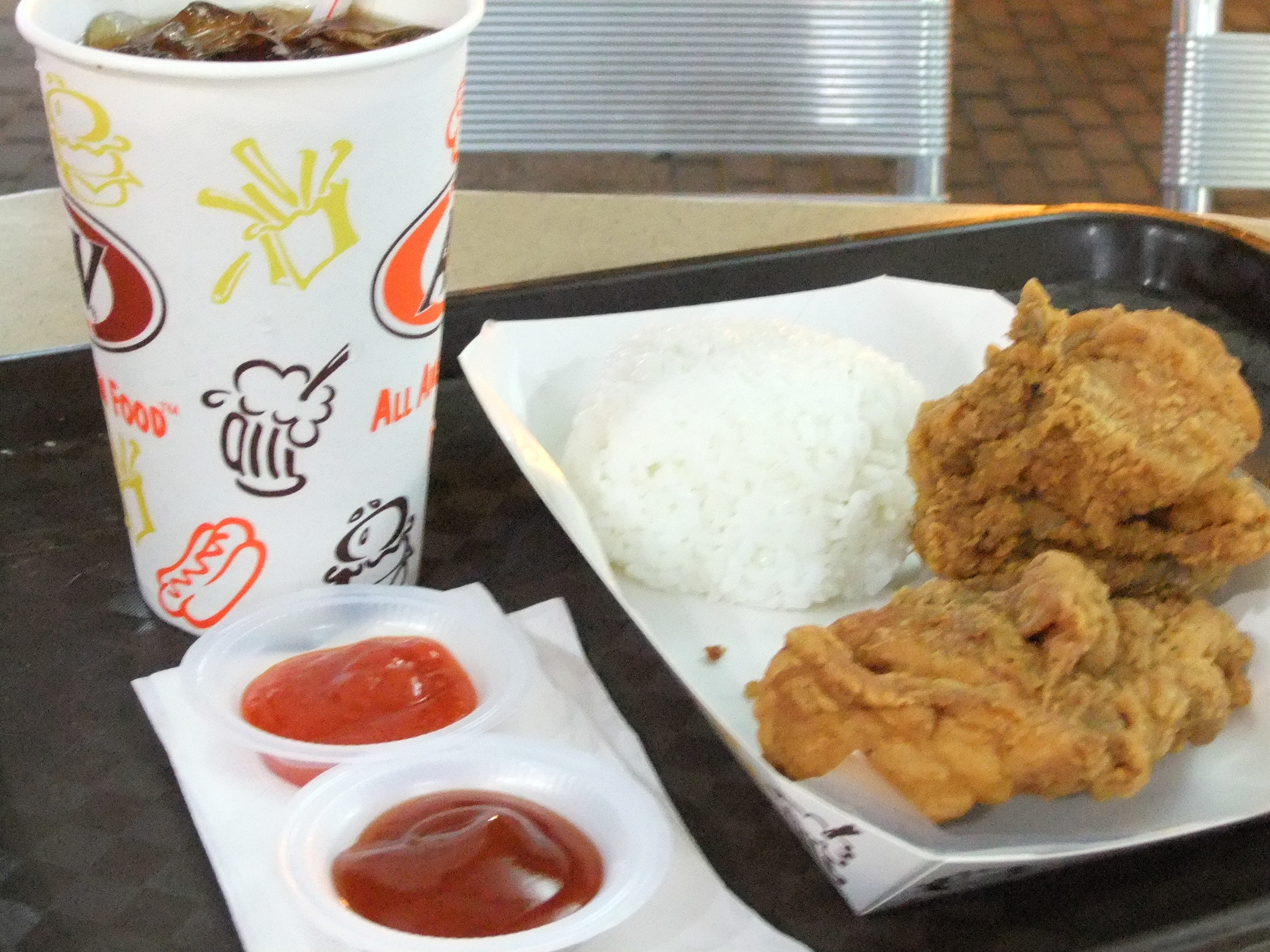
Fried chicken with rice, Jakarta, Indonesia

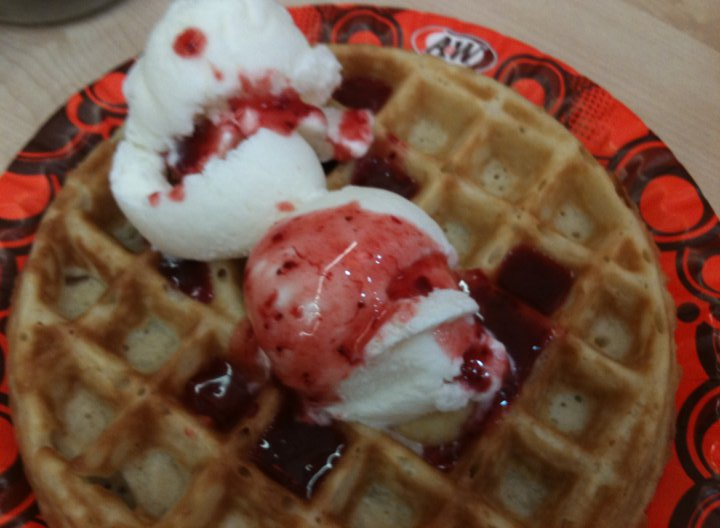
A&W waffles ice cream, Malaysia

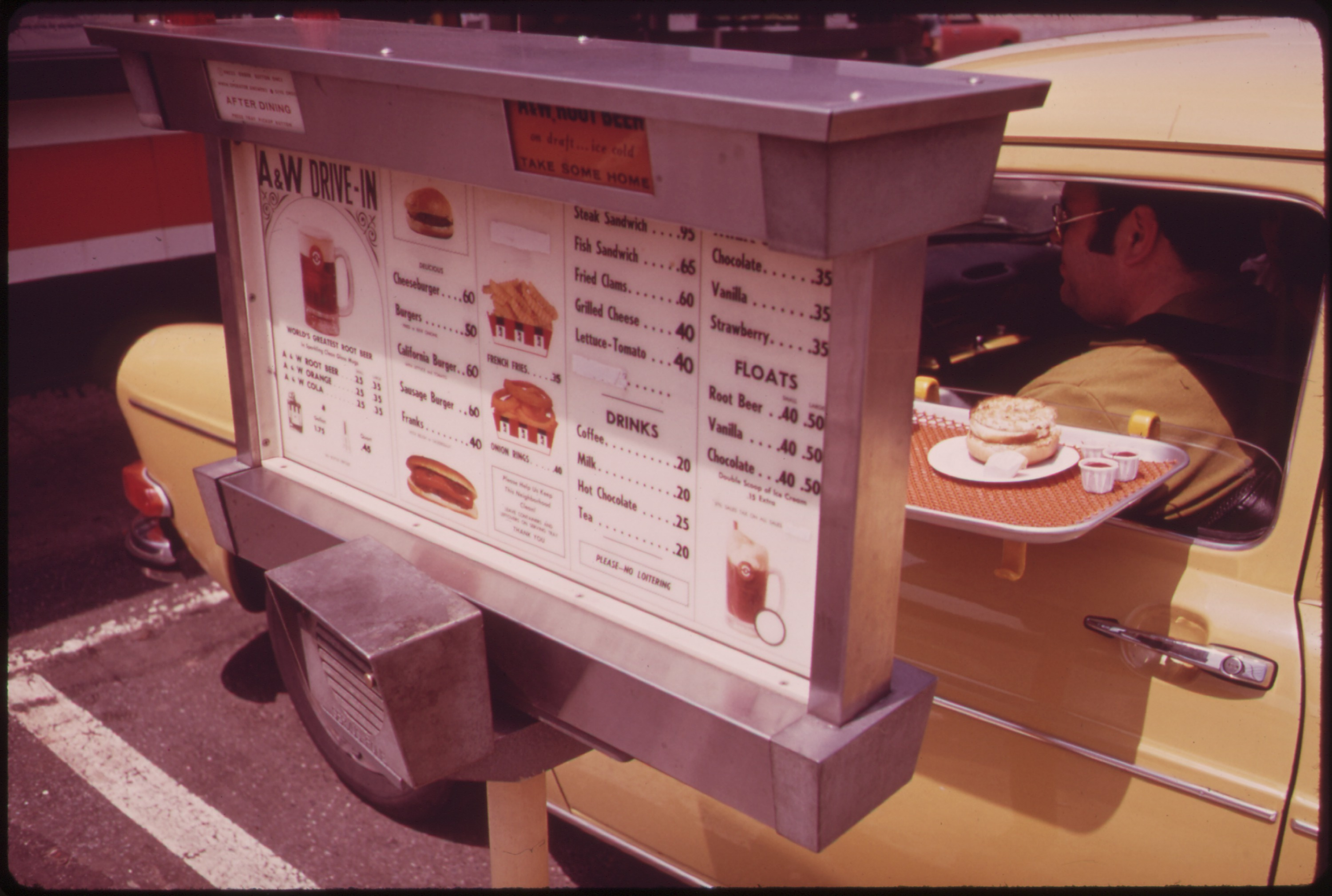
An A&W drive-in, in New York, 1973

== See also ==
- A&W (Canada)
- A&W Root Beer
- List of drive-in restaurants
- List of hamburger restaurants
- List of hot dog restaurants
