= Roy W. Allen =

American entrepreneur

- Born: September 30, 1882; Illinois, U.S.
- Died: March 26, 1968 (aged 85); Orange County, California, U.S.
- Known for: Founder of the predecessor of what is now A&W Restaurants, proprietor of A&W Root Beer
- Spouse: Luella Alice Allen

Roy W. Allen (September 30, 1882 – March 26, 1968) was an American entrepreneur who is best known for being a founder and namesake for A&W Root Beer and A&W Restaurants.

== Biography ==
=== Early life ===
Allen was born in Illinois in 1882 to a Mr. and Mrs. (née Davis) Allen. From there he headed west to California, working as a hotelier.

=== Career ===
During his time as a hotelier, Allen came across a chemist or pharmacist, while doing business in Arizona. He told Allen that he had allegedly perfected a mix for root beer. Intrigued by the prospect, Allen eventually purchased that recipe. He then opened a stand to sell it at Lodi, California in June 1919, originally charging 5¢. The first mugs of the drinks were sold to returning soldiers from the First World War. During that era, Prohibition had helped the sale of soft drinks across the United States, and Allen found success in his root beer stand. The drink gained the name "A&W Root Beer" in 1922 when an employee of Allen's stand in Stockton, Frank Wright, joined Allen in a partnership. The following year, A&W opened its first drive-in restaurant, located in Sacramento. Though Frank Wright was bought out another year later, the chain of root beer stands retained the same name. In 1925, with restaurants already in California, Texas and Utah, Allen set out to expand and franchise the chain, becoming the first franchise of drive-in restaurants in the United States, with just under 200 locations in the Western and Midwestern United States by 1930. To ensure a consistent product across franchises, Allen used a system where the top-secret root beer concentrate was sold to each franchise owner. By 1941, there were around 260 stands across the United States, though World War II created problems for Allen's chain due to shortages in product and employees, with multiple franchises going out of business. However, as the war came to an end, the chain went on to expand once again.

Allen retired in 1950, selling the root beer business to a Nebraskan businessman, Gene Hurtz. He died in 1968.
