= Long John Silver's =

Restaurant chain

Long John Silver's, LLC
- Current logo

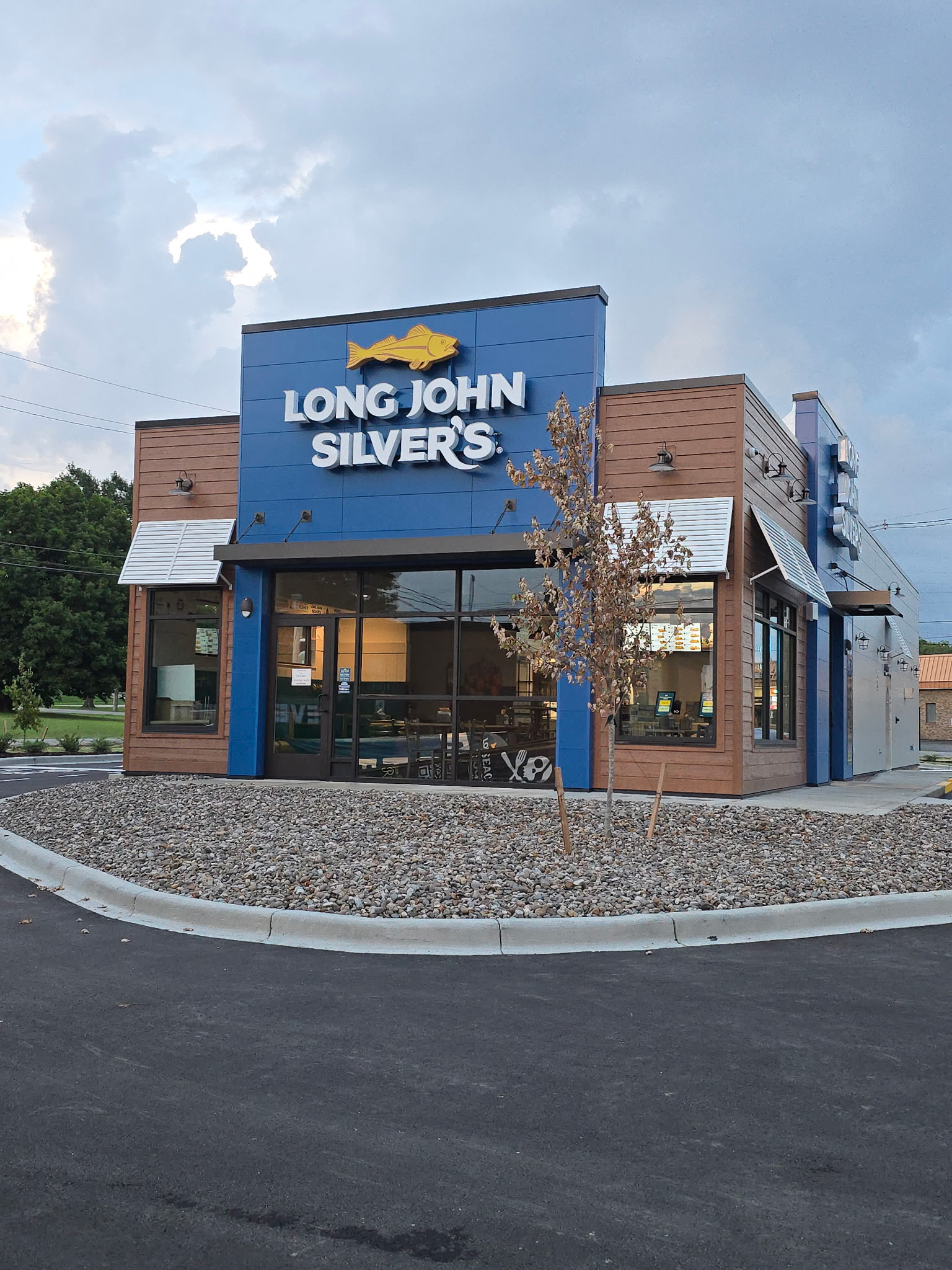
- The flagship LJS location in Louisville, Kentucky with the True North style structure in 2025.
- Trade name: Long John Silver's
- Formerly: Long John Silver's, Inc.
- Type: Private
- Industry: Restaurants
- Genre: Fast-food restaurant
- Founded: August 1969; Lexington, Kentucky, United States
- Founder: Jim Patterson
- Headquarters: Louisville, Kentucky, U.S.
- Number of locations: 486 (as of 2025)
- Area served: United States; Singapore; Indonesia; Malaysia; Thailand
- Products: Seafood
- Number of employees: 10,000+
- Parent: Independent (1969–1988); Jerrico Inc. (1988–1999); Yorkshire Global Restaurants (1999–2002); Yum! Brands (2002–2011); LJS Partners (2011–2022); Four Oaks Partners & Bob Jenkins (2022–present)
- Website: ljsilvers.com

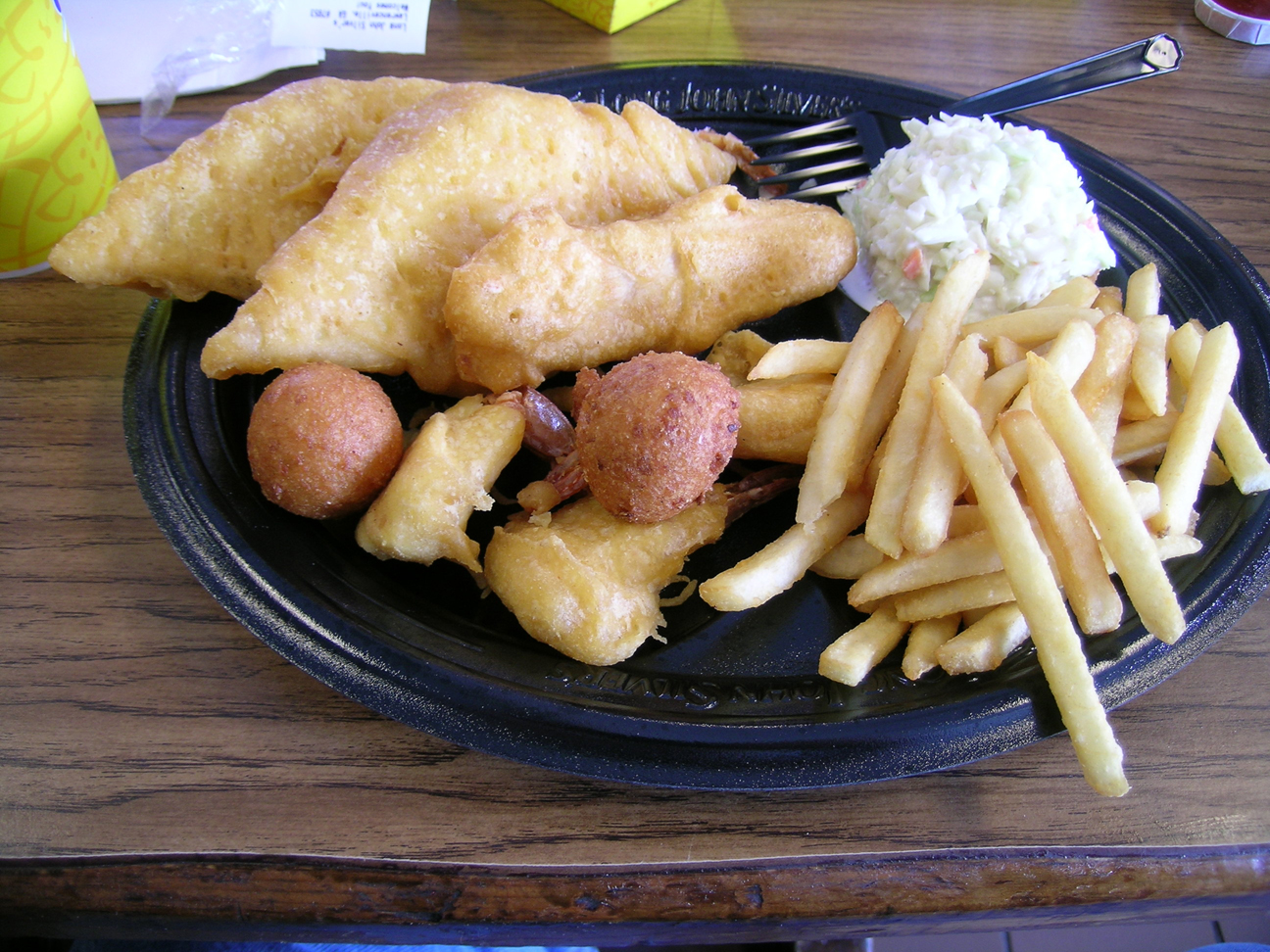
A typical meal from Long John Silver's: a platter with battered and fried fish and chicken, french fries, battered fried shrimp, hushpuppies and coleslaw

Long John Silver's, LLC is an American chain of fast-food restaurants that specializes in seafood. The brand's name is derived from the character of the same name from Robert Louis Stevenson's novel Treasure Island.

In November 2022, Long John Silver's was acquired by Four Oaks Partners, a group of investors led by Bob Jenkins, himself a Long John Silver's franchisee and president of Charter Foods.

In October 2025, Long John Silver's rebranded themselves as a chicken and seafood restaurant, revealing a new logo with chicken front and center. According to senior vice president Christopher Caudill, this change was made to let their "best-kept secret" out. The change was also made to bring in more customers as a response to a rise in the popularity of chicken across the United States.

== History ==
=== 1969–1999 ===
Long John Silver's was founded in 1969 by Jim Patterson in Lexington, Kentucky. The original location, on 301 Southland Drive, was previously the Cape Codder seafood carry-out restaurant. The original Cape Codder concrete block building was redesigned by architect Druce Henn, who created the New England style of Long John Silver's early chain restaurants. That original location is now a styling salon.

Earlier restaurants were known for their Cape Cod style buildings, blue roofs with square cupolas, wood benches/tables, lobster pots, and ship's wheels. Later, more nautically themed decorations were added such as seats made to look like nautical flags.

The chain arrived in Singapore in 1983 and has had a continuous presence in the country ever since. It remains one of 30 countries outside of the United States to have Long John Silver's outlets.

Early restaurants also featured separate entrance and exit doors, a corridor-like waiting line area, deep fryers with food heaters that were transparent so customers could view the food to be served, and wrought iron 'sword' door handles. These buildings had dock-like walkways, lined with pilings and thick ropes.

Long John Silver's was acquired by Jerrico in 1988. Jerrico was taken private in 1989 through a highly leveraged management buyout, and one year later, the other restaurant concepts were divested to focus on Long John Silver's.

After struggling for the next several years under its heavy debt load, Jerrico Inc. filed for Chapter 11 bankruptcy in June 1998. In September 1999, A&W announced to acquire the chain out of bankruptcy. As a result, Yorkshire Global Restaurants was formed.

=== 21st century ===
In 2000, Yorkshire Global Restaurants agreed to test multi-branded locations with Louisville, Kentucky-based Tricon Global, owner of the KFC, Pizza Hut, and Taco Bell chains.

The parent company of Long John Silver's and A&W, Yorkshire was acquired by Tricon Global and Tricon was renamed Yum! Brands, Inc in May 2002. By January 2011, Yum! announced it was seeking a buyer for its Long John Silver's and A&W Restaurants divisions, citing poor sales and a desire to shift its focus to international expansion.

In September 2011, Yum! announced the impending sale of Long John Silver's to LJS Partners – a group consisting of franchisees and other private investors.

In July 2013, the Center for Science in the Public Interest, a nutrition and health policy watchdog group, named Long John Silver's "Big Catch" meal the worst restaurant meal in America, noting that it contained 33 grams of trans fat, 19 grams of saturated fat, 1,320 calories, and almost 3,700 milligrams of sodium. The company announced that it had eliminated trans fats from its menu by January 2014.

In March 2015, James O'Reilly, who had previously worked for KFC (another Yum! Brands holding), was appointed as the CEO. He stated that he expected the chain to maintain its 1,132 stores, refocus its marketing following negative press about the fat and sodium content of the menu, and looked to the possibility of future expansion.

On May 22, 2018, Long John Silver's announced the acquisition of 76 franchised restaurants, primarily owned and renovated by ServUS, located primarily in Indiana. On October 19, 2019, Warren W. Rosenthal, former president of Jerrico and developer of 1,350 Long John Silver's restaurants, died, aged 96.

On January 18, 2021, Long John Silver's announced Blain Shortreed to take over as CEO.

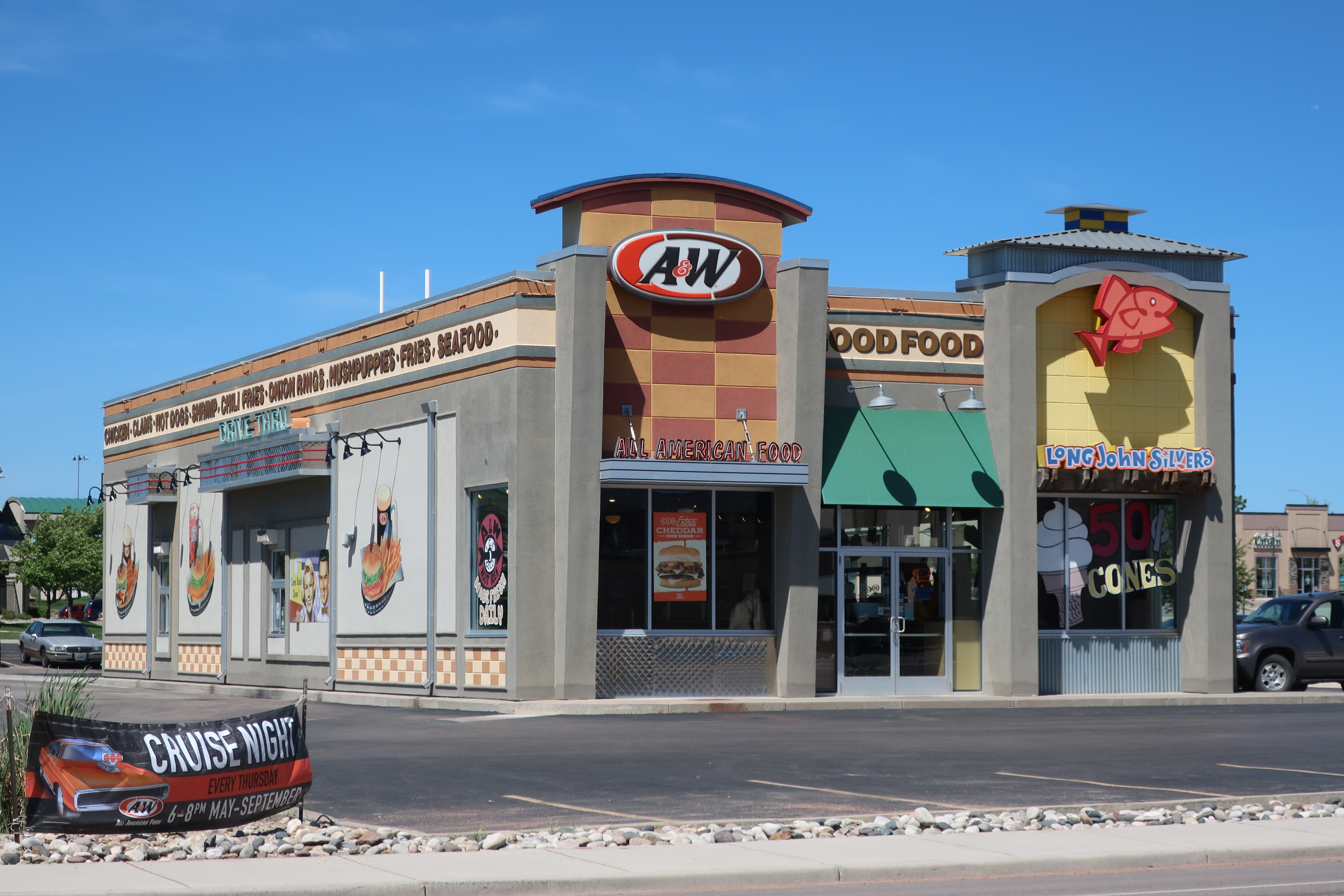
A co-branded LJS and A&W restaurant in Gillette, Wyoming, in 2018

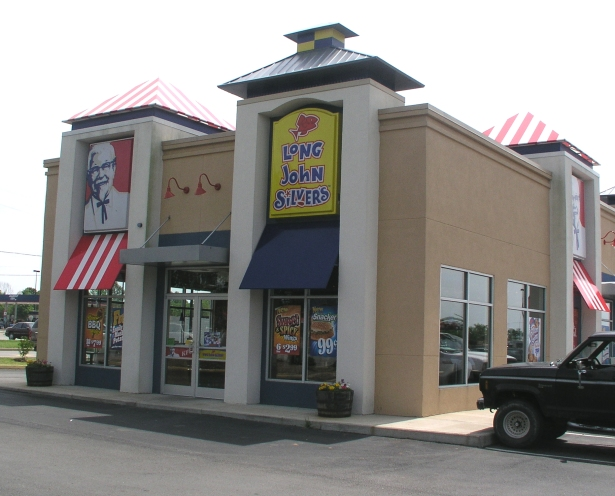
A co-branded KFC and LJS restaurant in Lafayette, Tennessee, in 2006

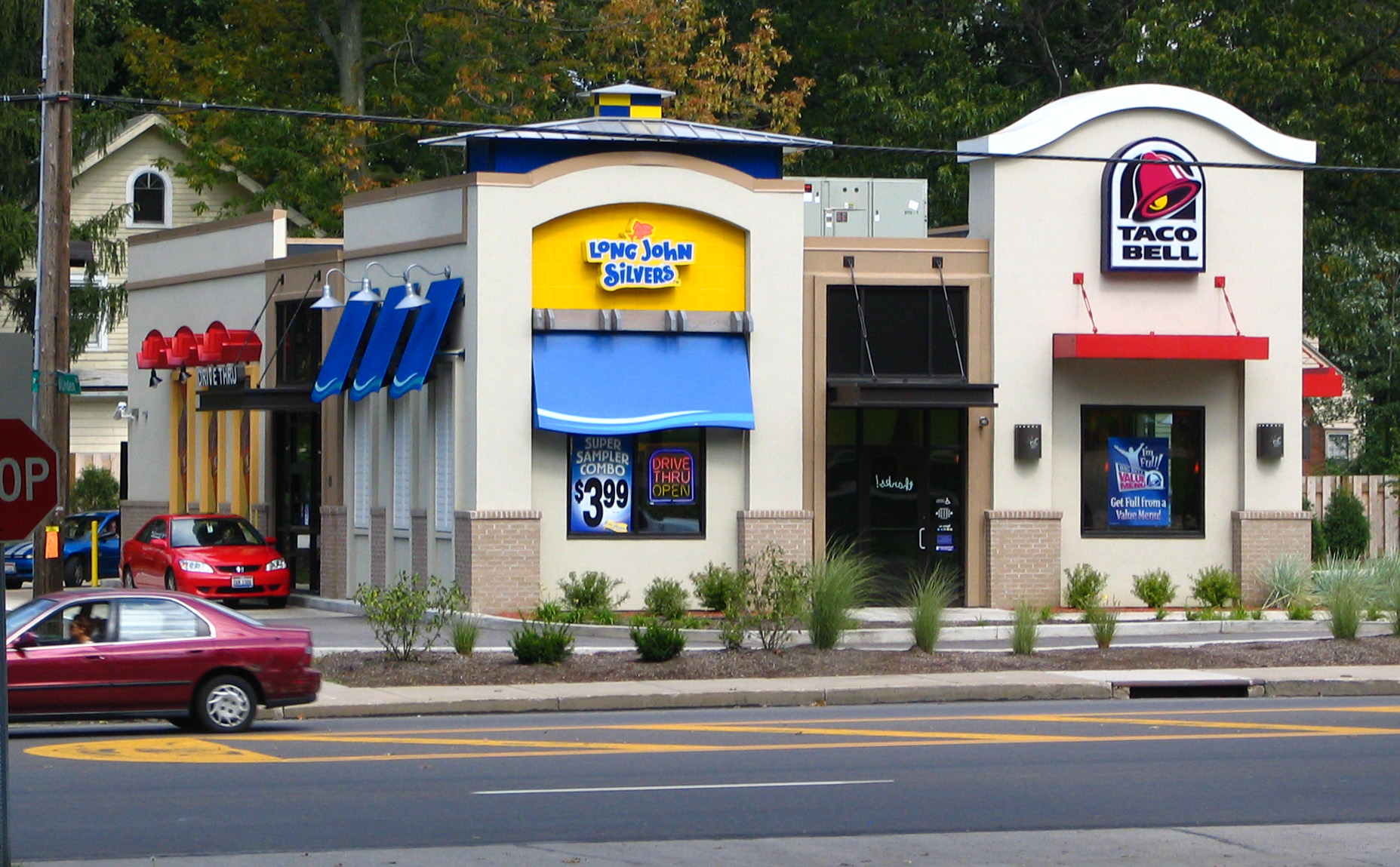
A former co-branded LJS and Taco Bell restaurant in Kent, Ohio, in 2006 before the location became entirely a Taco Bell premise

== Locations ==
Current

- United States (Since 1969)
- Singapore (Since 1983)
- Indonesia (Since 2023)
- Malaysia (Since 2024; previously since 2000s)
- Thailand (Since 2024; previously until 2020)

Former

- Canada (Closed 2006)
- Taiwan (Closed 2009)
- United Kingdom (Closed 2010s)
- Saudi Arabia (Closed 2000s)
- United Arab Emirates
- Vietnam
- Cambodia
- China (Closed 2000s)
- Australia
- Puerto Rico (Closed 2018)
- South Korea
- Qatar
- Oman
- Bahrain
- Hong Kong
- Kuwait (closed 2000s)
- Japan (closed 1984)

Planned

- Philippines (Previously closed 2019)
- Myanmar
- Brunei
- Laos

=== North America ===
The chain has 374 restaurants in 25 American states.

Long John Silver's expanded to Canada in the 1970s, but did not last long there. It returned in 2003 with one restaurant opening in Peterborough, Ontario, only to close down in 2006.

=== Asia ===
Singapore has remained as Long John Silver's most dominant international market.

The first Long John Silver's restaurant opened in Indonesia in May 2023 and plans to open up further outlets in the country.

Long John Silver's operated in Malaysia for some time, but shut down due to declining sales and being downplayed by competitors and rivals such as KFC and local seafood restaurants. It returned and opened a location in Putrajaya in February 2024.

Long John Silver's operated in Taiwan for some time but shut down by 2009.

Long John Silver's operated in Philippines at SM City Manila for a time but shut down in 2019 due to declining sales and low demand.

Long John Silver's was in Saudi Arabia for some time. However, similar to restaurants like Dairy Queen, Taco Bell and Red Lobster, it was not popular and shut down in the country.

Long John Silver's existed in Thailand for some time but shut down by 2020. In 2023, the company stated that they are planning to return to the country as part of the chain's Asian expansion. It returned to Thailand in 2024, with the first store opening in Mega Bangna shopping center.

Long John Silver's shut down in United Arab Emirates due to bad sales.

The chain also formerly had outlets in Vietnam, Cambodia, China, Australia, South Korea, Qatar, Oman, Bahrain, Hong Kong, Kuwait and Japan. It will also soon come to Myanmar, Brunei and Laos.

=== Europe ===
A location opened at Walsall in the United Kingdom in 2004, but it has since been closed.

== See also ==
- Arthur Treacher's
- Captain D's
- Popeyes
