= Shute Park Aquatic & Recreation Center =

Multi-pool facility in Hillsboro, Oregon

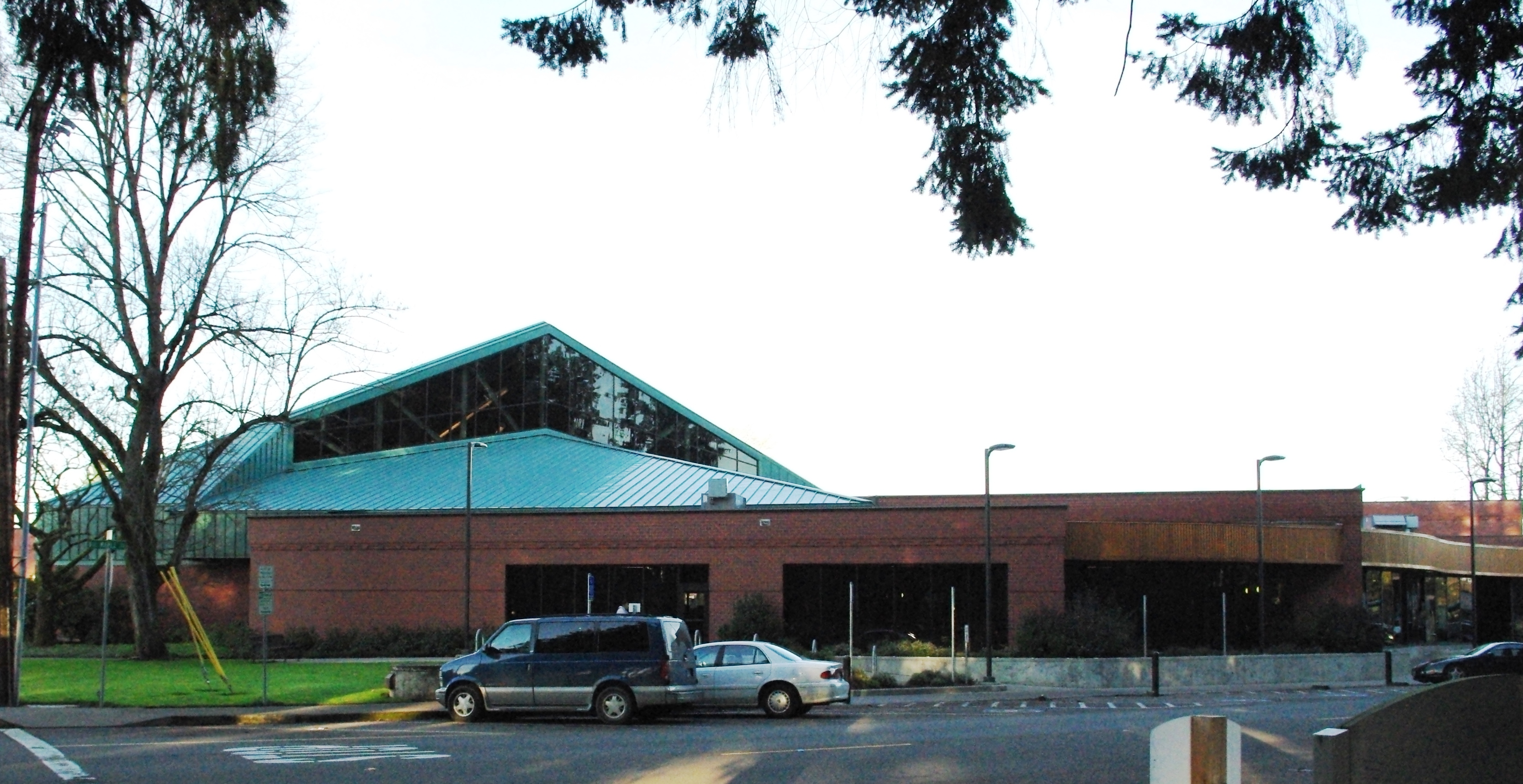
- Exterior of the Aquatic Center
- Alternative names: Hillsboro Aquatic Center

General information
- Location: Hillsboro, Oregon, 953 SE Maple Street
- Coordinates: 45.5155°N 122.9748°W
- Construction started: 1980
- Completed: 1981
- Renovated: 2004-2006
- Cost: $2.5 million
- Renovation cost: $9 million
- Owner: City of Hillsboro

Technical details
- Floor area: 43,480 square feet (4,039 m^{2})

Renovating team
- Renovating firm: Todd Construction

Website
- hillsboro-oregon.gov

The Shute Park Aquatic & Recreation Center (SHARC) is a multi-pool indoor and outdoor facility located in Hillsboro in the U.S. state of Oregon. Originally opened in 1954 as an outdoor at Shute Park, an indoor recreation center and pool opened in 1981. The indoor recreation center, which includes a weight room, spa, a wading pool, and classroom space, was expanded in 2006 at a cost of $9 million.

== History ==
Proposals to build a pool for the city began as early as 1934 when the city council referred one plan to the city’s budget committee. That proposal would have been paid for using bonds and be built by the New Deal's State Emergency Relief Administration at Shute Park. Plans to build a pool at Shute Park came to fruition in 1953 when the project was allotted about $90,000 in controlled materials by the National Production Authority, after $90,000 in bonds were approved by voters in June 1950 for construction of a pool. The pool then opened in 1954, and the next year the city decided to keep it operating seven days a week during the summer. That original outdoor pool is 150 feet (46 m) long and 51 feet (16 m) wide. During the early years of the facility, it hosted an annual water show that included diving, water ballet, and a comedy skit.

A $2.6 million bond measure went before voters in September 1979 to finance construction of an indoor pool, along with a second operating levy to pay for the operations. The plan called for a main pool, a sauna, racquetball courts, a shallow pool for children, and a hydrotherapy pool, among other amenities. Voters passed both of the measures for what would be a 26,777-square-foot (2,487.7 m^{2}) center, with construction beginning in summer 1980. The aquatics center was completed in 1981 and opened in September that year. The facility included an indoor pool with locker rooms, a weight room, and three racquetball courts. The new center cost $2.5 million to build, with C.A. Lantz Construction Co. serving as the general contractor. The project faced several delays due to leaks in the roof.

The main indoor pool is 75 feet (23 m) long and 25 feet (7.6 m) wide. In August 1988, the original pool house for the outdoor pool became the new headquarters for the Parks and Recreation Department after a $65,000 remodeling project. The city worked to repair the roof on the center in 1989 while also suing the original contractor over the leaking roof.

By 1998 pool usage had climbed to approximately 200,000 annual visits, so the city put forward a bond measure to voters to build a new pool at the aquatic center and to build a new 60,000 square feet (5,600 m^{2}) aquatic in the Ronler Acres area. The new center would include a wave pool and overall the bond would have allow for borrowing of $15.7 million for the projects. The bond went to voters in May and received more than 50% of the vote, but Oregon’s double majority rule prevented the measure from passing. The city tried again in November 1998, but the measure failed.

In September 2004, the center closed for renovations that included fixing the roof and plumbing. The center was to be closed until June 2005, though the outdoor pool was to remain open during the originally estimated $5.2 million project that would also expand the center. Although the center closed in September, a contract for the construction was not finalized until December 2004 when Todd Construction won with a $6.4 million bid. At that time, the pool was scheduled to re-open in November or December 2005.

While the Shute Park facility was under renovation, the city began plans to build a second aquatic center for the city. In January 2006, the city announced plans to build a center at Northeast 53rd Avenue where they had purchased 41 acres (17 ha), including a storage building once used by Soloflex. That property became 53rd Avenue Park that opened in 2008.

The Shute Park center re-opened in March 2006 after a $9 million expansion and renovation. After the expansion, SHARC was then 43,480 square feet (4,039 m^{2}) in size that allowed for expanding indoor activities such as group exercise, more classrooms, and other classes that had been held at the Tyson Recreation Center. In August 2008, employees used an automated external defibrillator to help save a visitor's life. By 2011 the center served approximately 230,000 people each year.

== Amenities ==
Located at southwest Maple Street at Tenth Avenue, SHARC has a variety of water based and indoor features. Pools include the original outdoor pool that measures 50 yards (46 m) by 17 yards (16 m) and has two diving boards, but is only opening during the summer except for members of various swim teams. Indoors are the main pool and a smaller wading pool designed for children and beginning swimmers. The main pool is 25 metres (82 ft) by 25 yards (23 m) and L-shaped that includes a slide and one diving board. The smaller wading pool includes an elevated teacup.

As a recreation center, SHARC has a weight room, a cardio room, and multipurpose rooms where various classes are offered. There is also a spa pool and dry sauna. Other amenities include locker rooms, including a family changing area, child care, and a snack bar.

== Burger family ==
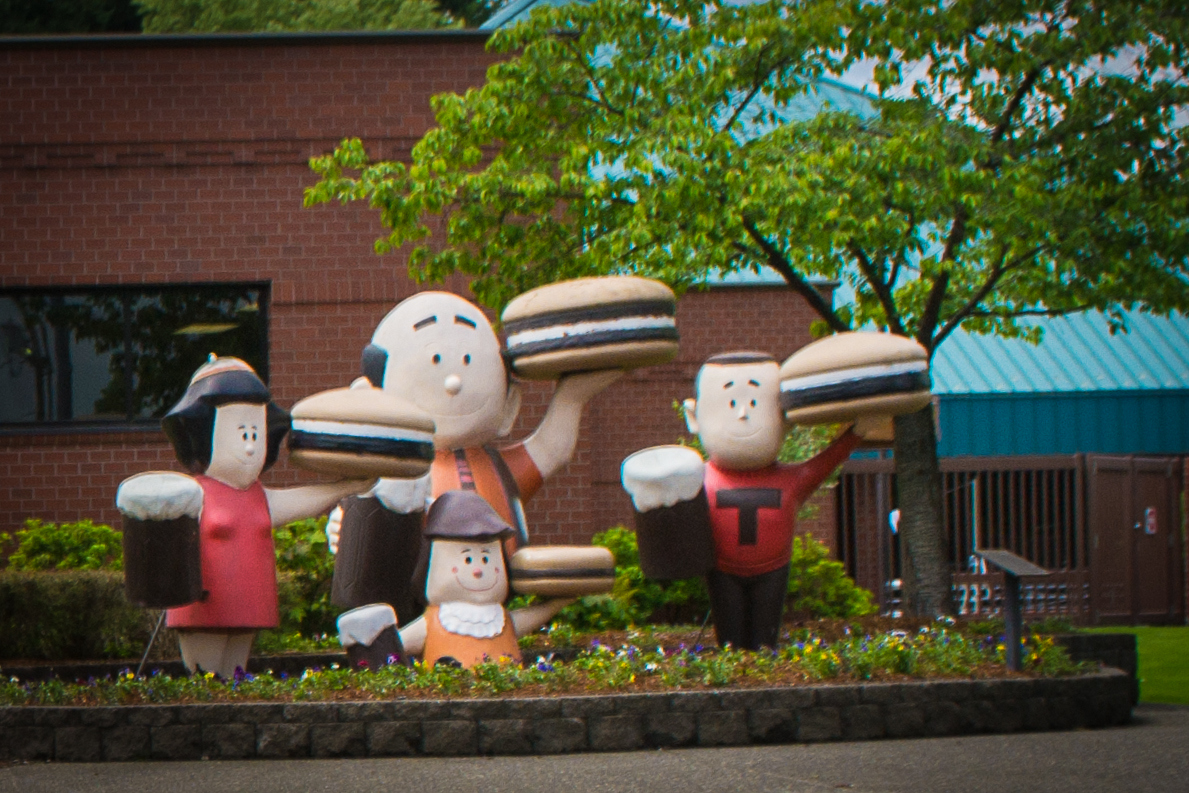
The Burger Family at the Aquatic Center

A family of three A & W Burger statues were moved to the grounds of the center in 1991 from the Papa Aldo’s restaurant across the street. Considered a temporary move at the time, the family was missing the Teen Burger character when the former restaurant owner donated the fiberglass statues to the city. A replacement Teen Burger character was later acquired from a mall in Longview, Washington to complete the family.

== See also ==
- List of sports venues in Portland, Oregon
