= High Road to China =

High Road to China or The High Road to China may refer to:

- High Road to China (novel), a 1977 novel by Jon Cleary
- High Road to China (film), a 1983 American adventure film based on Cleary's novel
- The High Road to China (book), a 2007 nonfiction book by Kate Teltscher
- "The High Road to China" (The Drew Carey Show), a 1998 episode of the American sitcom The Drew Carey Show
