= The Burger Family =

Name given to a group of mascots used by A&W Restaurants

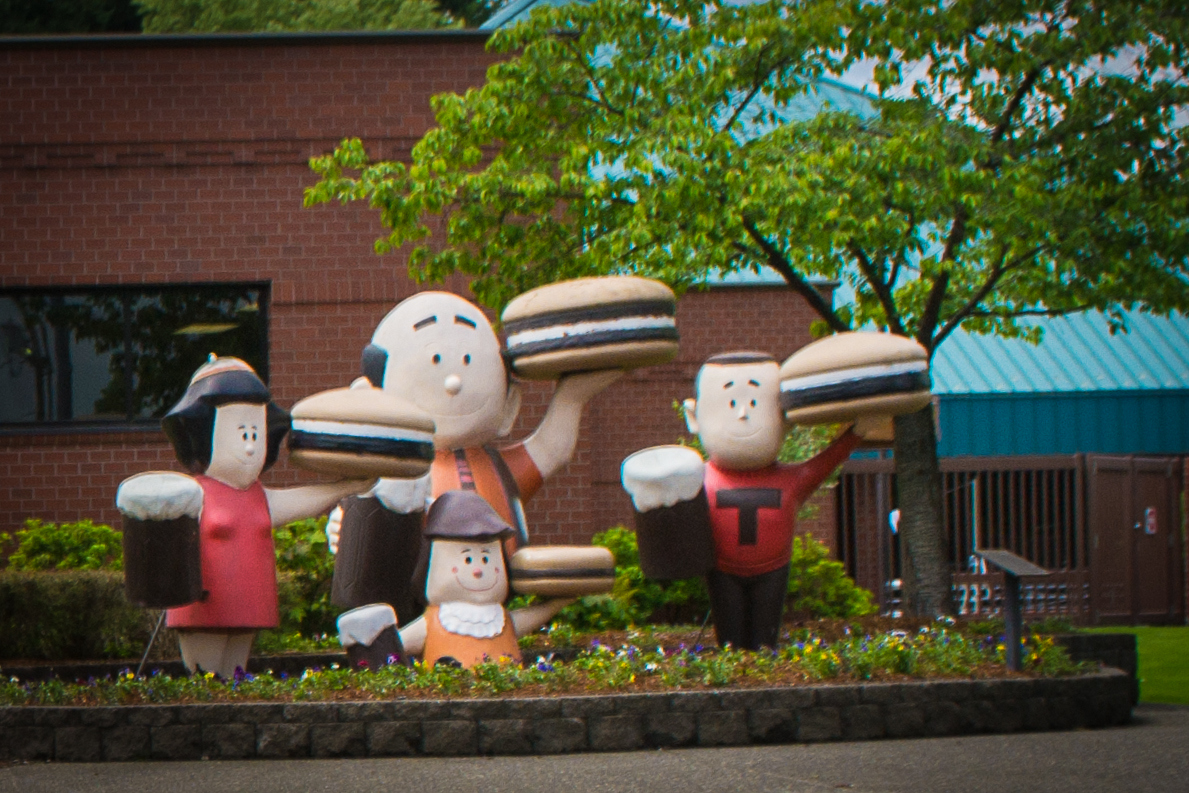
A 1950s A&W Burger Family display at the Shute Park Aquatic & Recreation Center in Hillsboro, Oregon

The Burger Family was a name given to a group of mascots used by A&W Restaurants in the United States beginning in 1963, and successively used by the Canadian chain, where the mascots remained in use for longer and still have their respective burgers on the menu. The characters were made obsolete gradually starting in 1974, when A&W decided to prioritize The Great Root Bear as its mascot.

== Overview ==
The Burger Family consisted of four characters, each of them named after the line of hamburgers A&W introduced in the 1960s (Papa, Mama, Teen, Baby), often seen in fiberglass statues holding a burger on one hand and a mug of root beer on the other. The characters were created following a 1950s and 60s trend for burger restaurants to have their own mascots. Each burger had a wrapper featuring a cartoon image of the corresponding character.

Following the introduction of The Great Root Bear, the role of the family downsized, so were the names of the burgers. A&W's president started issuing orders to destroy the mascots. Years after the mascots were displaced, several A&W franchise owners kept the statues. In 1983, the Hillsboro Planning Commission declared the Burger Family as an official Cultural Resource. The burgers were renamed in the 1980s, becoming the Deluxe Burgers line, although the chain did a minor reprieve in 2004 by reinstating the Papa Burger as A&W's flagship burger. The other burgers of the former line still exist, but under new names. As of 2025, out of the original 1,100 statues, only 50 are still on display, while there are more believed to be in private collections. Some of the surviving mascots have been repainted for other uses, becoming humanoids or lumberjacks. Damaged statues were later given to private collections.

A&W still holds the copyrights to the mascots, making knock-offs impossible.

== In Canada ==
The burger line is still in use in Canada. In 2024, A&W Canada introduced a new advertising campaign involving the abstract concept of the Burger Family but putting it in interpersonal relationships.

Canada also expanded the burger family with the additions of the Grandpa Burger, Grandma Burger, Uncle Burger, Buddy Burger and Sirloin Baby Burger Twins.

== See also ==
- List of American advertising characters
