= Turner Creek Park =

Public park in Hillsboro, Oregon, United States

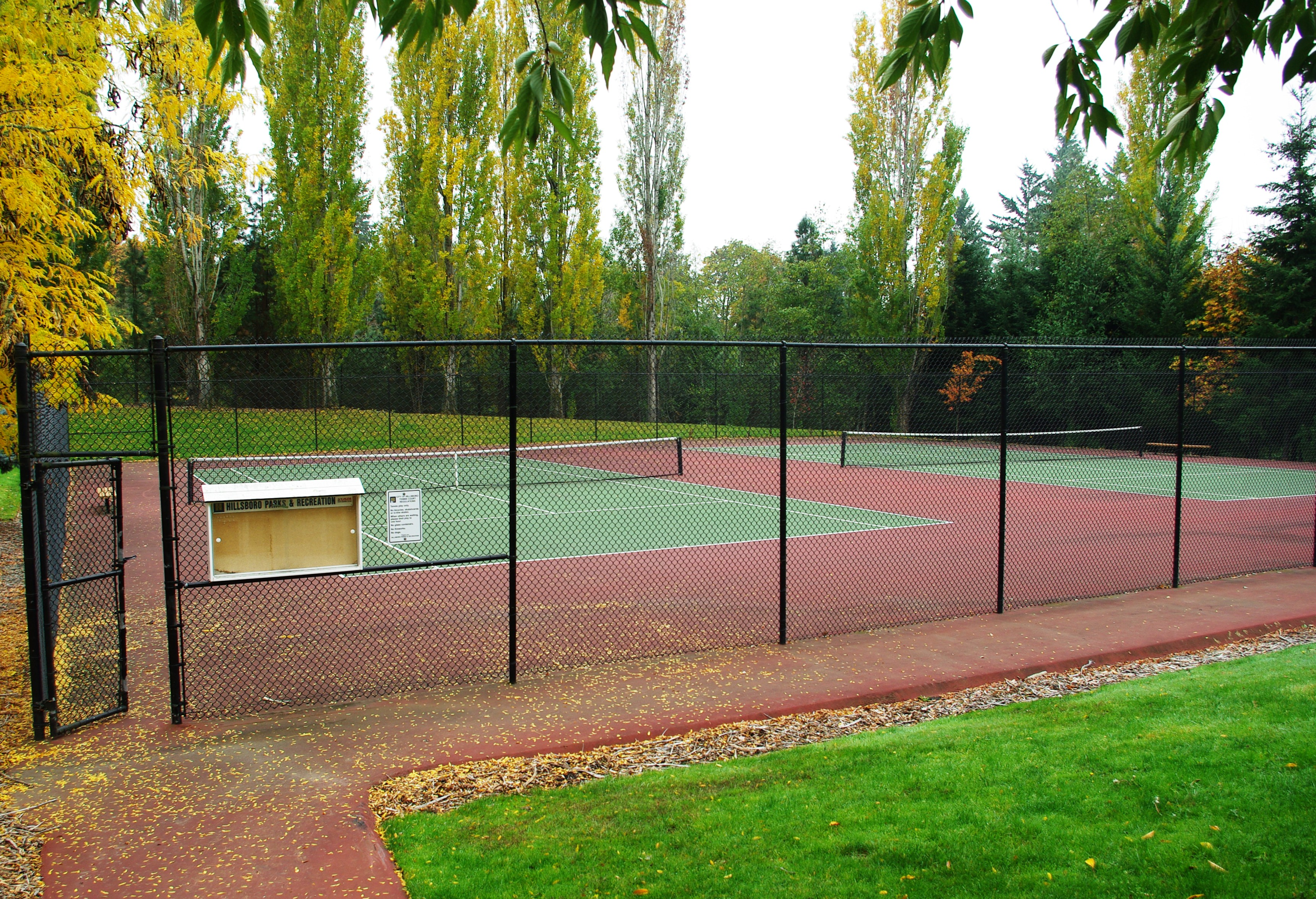
- Tennis courts at the park
- Interactive map of Turner Creek Park
- Type: Public, city
- Location: Hillsboro, Oregon; United States
- Coordinates: 45°30′45″N 122°57′14″W
- Area: 12.5 acres (51,000 m^{2})
- Created: 1990
- Operator: Hillsboro Parks & Recreation Department
- Status: open
- Website: Turner Creek Park

Turner Creek Park is a municipal park in Hillsboro in the U.S. state of Oregon. Opened about 1990, the 12.5-acre (51,000 m^{2}) park is located in the middle of the city along Turner Creek near southwest 32nd Avenue between Tualatin Valley Highway and Main Street. The park includes a playground, restrooms, several sports facilities, and natural areas with trails.

== History ==
Turner Creek Park opened about 1990 near W. L. Henry Elementary School and southwest 32nd Avenue in the center of Hillsboro. Construction included building dams and trails along the creek, with some labor provided by an alternative school program paid for by the federal government. During construction the city received donation of nearly 100 trees from a local nursery and Portland General Electric, with volunteers providing the labor to plant the trees. During the summer of 1992 some trees at the park died due to a drought. The city sought to receive 75 live former Christmas trees in donations from local residents after Christmas in 1992 to plant at the park to replace those that died.

From 1993 to 1994, the city’s parks and recreation department worked with civic groups and used a grant to improve the natural areas of the park, which included consolidation of a variety of trails, plantings, and adding bird houses. A wildflower garden was added in 1997. Bisected by Turner Creek, the wetlands area of the park and the creek have experienced numerous sewer overflows beginning around 1995. An older sewer line runs along the creek and passes through the park on its way south to the wastewater treatment plant operated by Clean Water Services at Rock Creek. The city was fined $32,000 by the state over its clean up of spills in 2006.

The park played host to Heritage Christian School’s Latin Olympika games in 2003. City residents rejected a bond measure in November 2008 that would have paid for improvements at Turner Creek Park among six other parks as well as a recreation center at 53rd Avenue Park. As of August 2009, Turner Creek was one of only three parks in the city that had not been adopted under the parks departments adopt a park program. A new playground was installed in a single day by volunteers in August 2018.

== Amenities ==
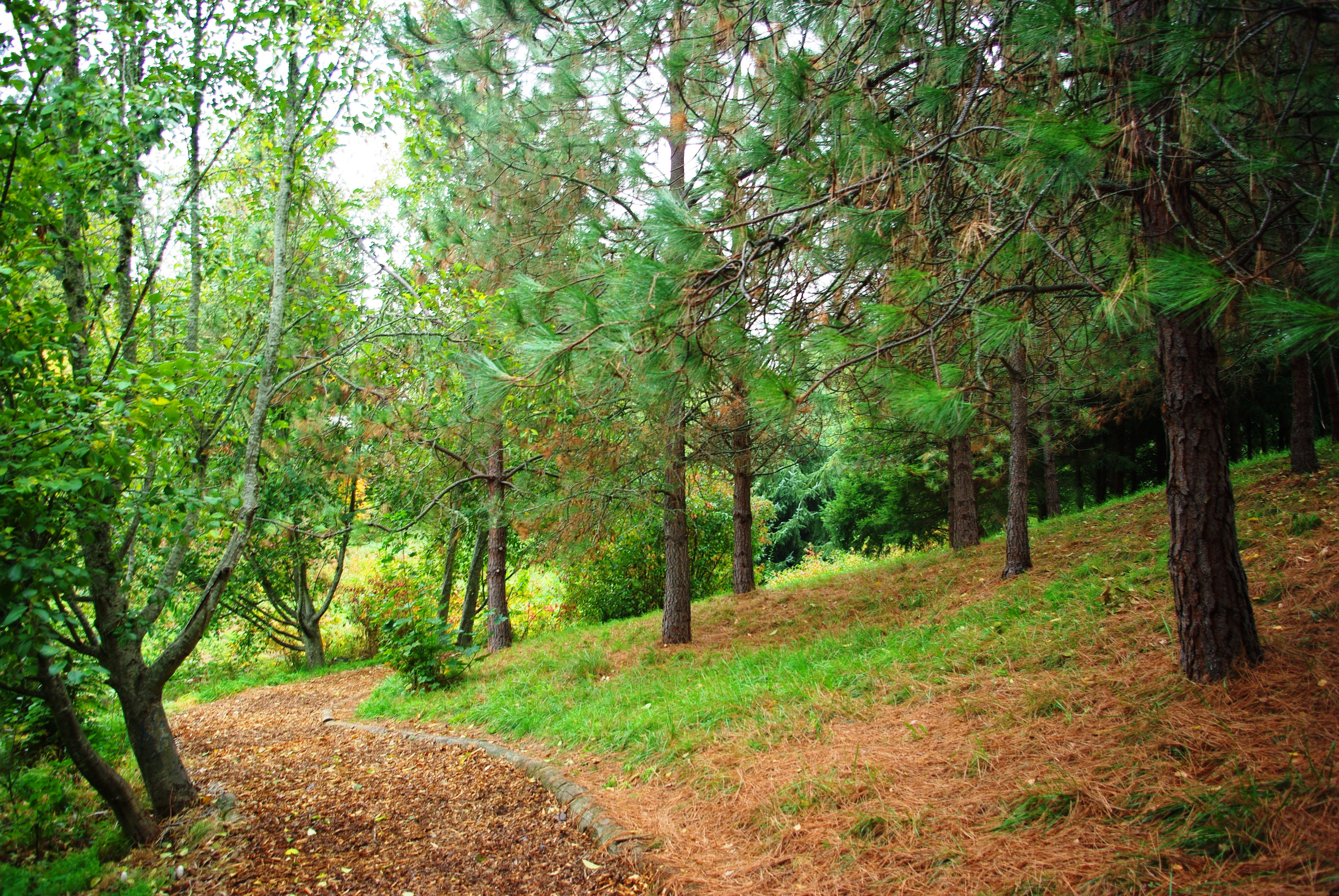
Trail down a small canyon

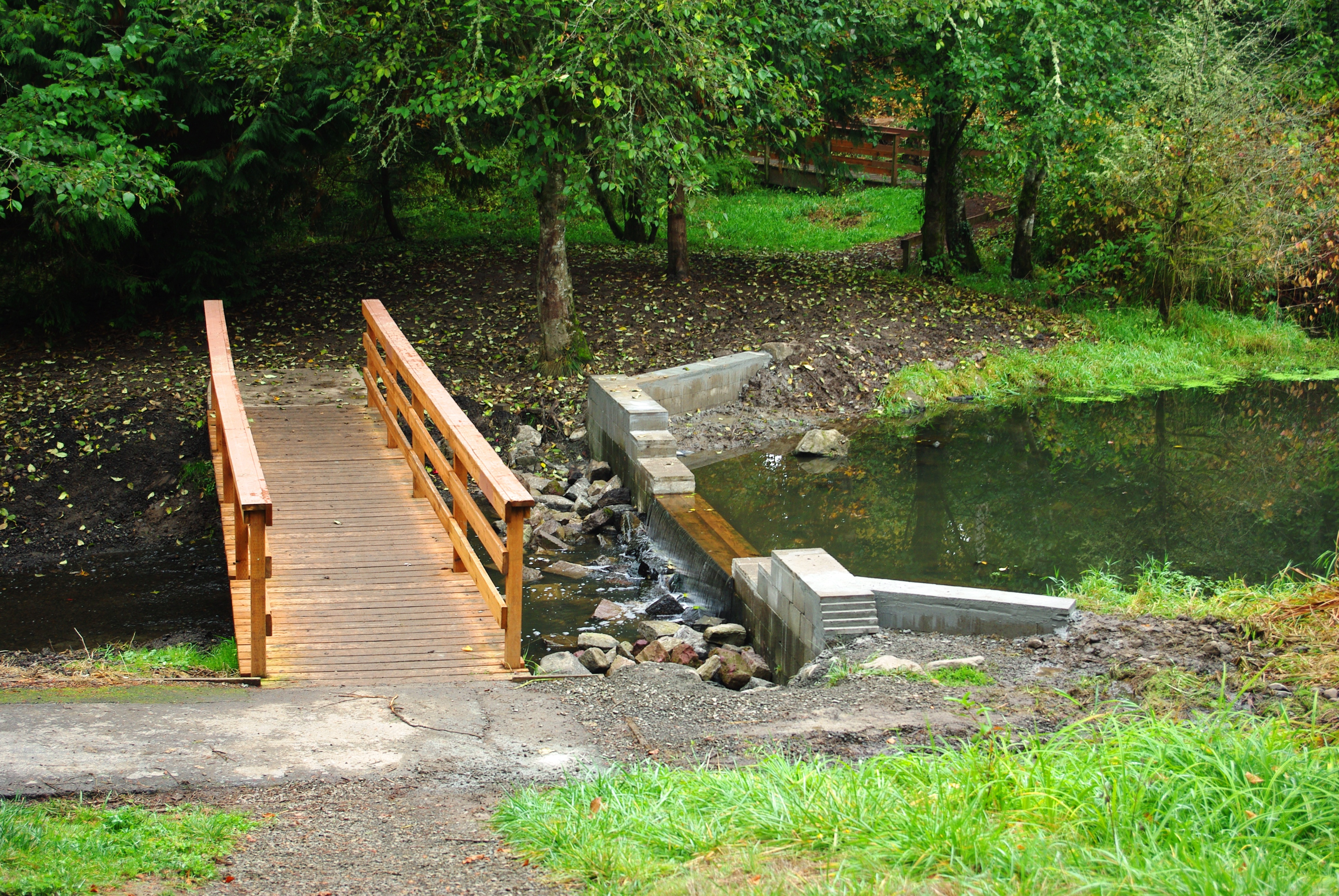
Bridge and dam

The west section of the park contains natural areas

The 12.5-acre (5.1 ha) park includes athletic facilities, wetlands, and wooded sections. Features include play equipment for children, picnic areas, restrooms, and parking. Sports features are two tennis courts, one soccer field, and two softball fields.

The natural area on the west side of the park has paved and wood chip trails leading to a boardwalk and bridge across Turner Creek. These trails run down a small canyon that separates the improved portions of the park from the creek and connect to the elementary school. About four acres are along the creek, which was changed to meander through the area which includes ponds and islands. The city changed the stream by building small dikes that are closed in the summertime to collect water and create pools for use by wildlife, including great blue herons. Other animals at the park include garter snakes, gulls, frogs, fish, and blackbirds among others. Flora include purple iris, sedges, nodding beggar-tick, knotweed, jewelweed, and Veronica.
