= The Great Root Bear =

Mascot of A&W American restaurant chain

Rooty the Great Root Bear
- A&W Restaurants character
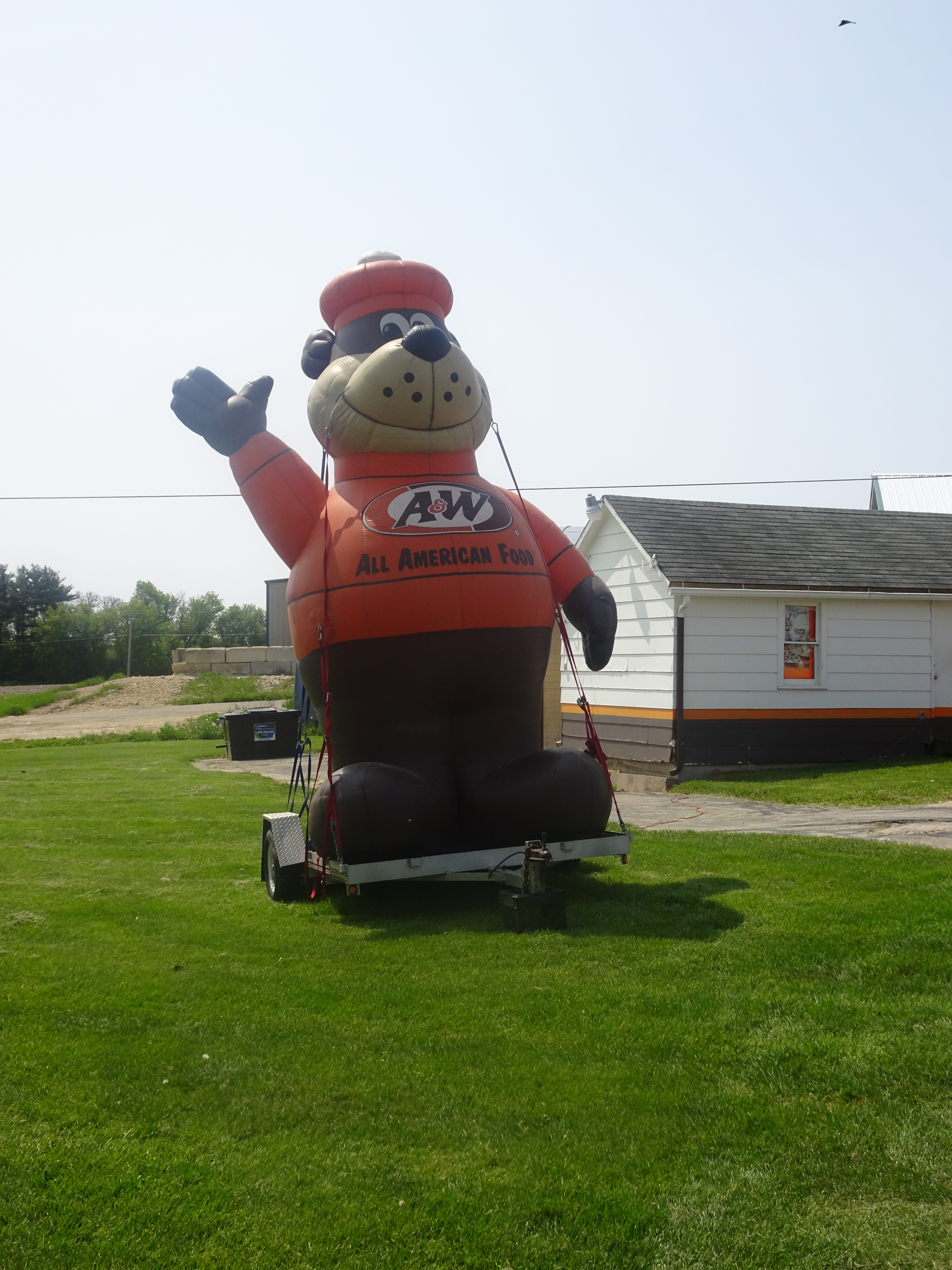
- Rooty in his American version, in a statue photographed at the Iowa County, Wisconsin location in 2016
- First appearance: 1973; 53 years ago

In-universe information
- Species: Brown bear
- Gender: Male
- Occupation: Bear mascot for the A&W Restaurants fast food chain

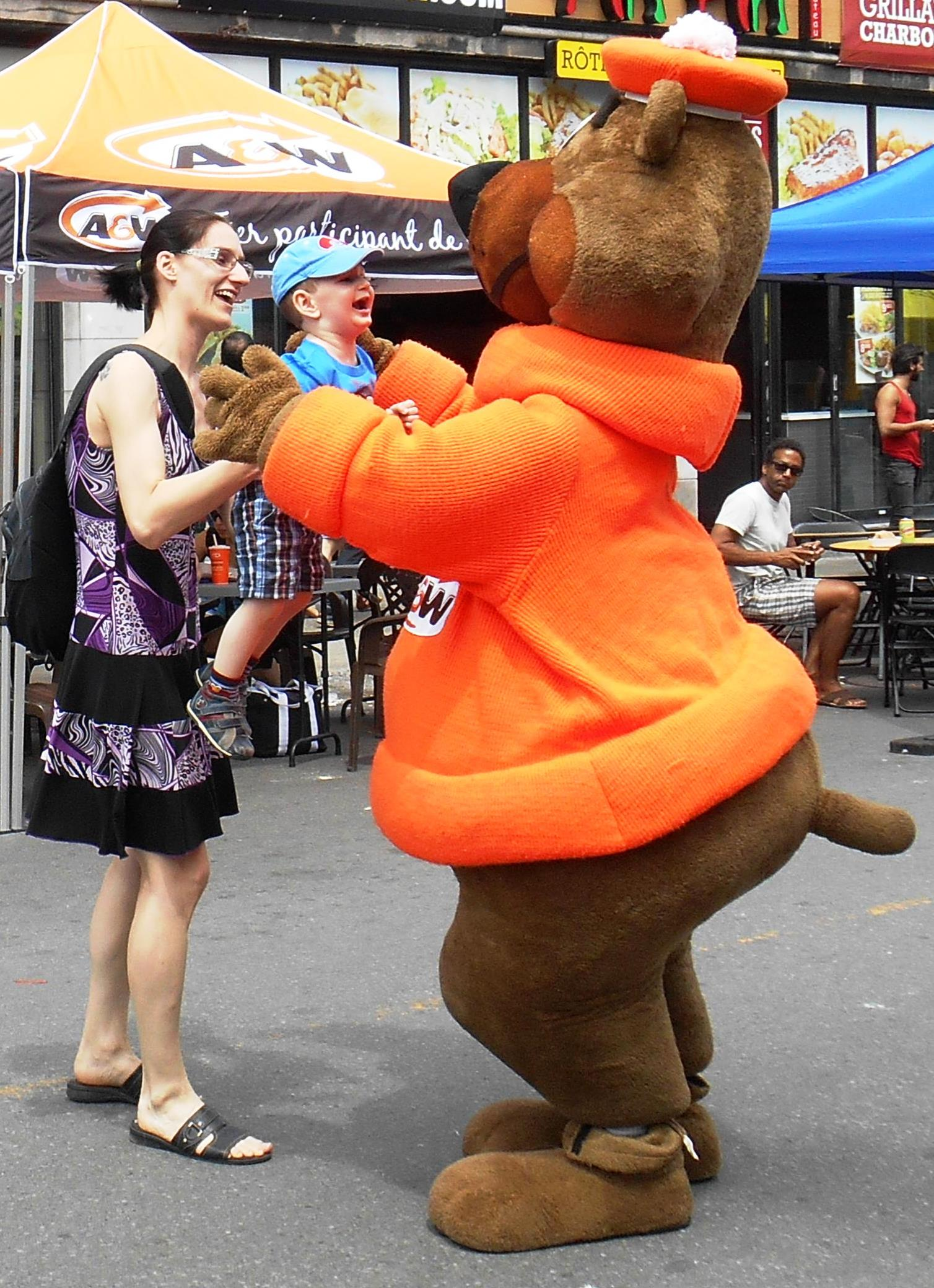
Rooty in his Canadian version

The Great Root Bear, or Rooty, also known as Grand Ours A&W in Quebec, is an anthropomorphic brown bear used as the mascot (or "spokesbear") of A&W Restaurants in the United States, Canada, and parts of Asia. Canadian operations use a region-specific version of the character. The mascot was introduced in 1973. In the United States, the mascot went out of use in the 2000s but resurged in 2012.

== Appearance ==
Rooty's appearance is nearly identical in the United States and Asian branches. He is a 7-foot bipedal brown bear with a tan snout, orange hat, and orange pullover sweater bearing the A&W logo. The Canadian version has a modified face and a brown snout. Some have compared his appearance to Yogi Bear.

== History ==
=== Creation and early development ===
By the early 1970s, A&W was losing sales to McDonald's and KFC in both the United States and Canada. The Canadian operations were sold to Unilever in an attempt to keep the chain profitable. In 1972, A&W's newly independent Canadian branch appointed Ron Woodall to develop a television commercial and a new mascot. The goal was to create a campaign that did not show food or specific eating habits. If the campaign failed, Unilever would sell the chain.

Woodall sketched concepts and went to Smuggler Cove Marine Provincial Park, north of Vancouver, to film the first commercial and pitch the new mascot. A focus group was set up in Toronto to gather public opinions, and the results of the earlier test in Vancouver were discarded. A prototype of the first commercial was shown to a test audience and performed well enough for Unilever to proceed. With a limited budget, a commercial was planned in Alberta. Edmonton was initially considered as a site for shooting the commercial, but rapid development led to rejection, and nearby rural areas experienced heavy traffic. Pincher Creek was ultimately selected. For the shoot, hotels were booked past their seasonal closing. The bear was performed by a ballerina (Katherine) and characters resembling the Marx Brothers, along with Hulk Hogan and Evel Knievel following the bear.

=== International adoption ===
Statue of The Great Root Bear photographed at the Wittenberg, Wisconsin location in 1988

Before long, the Great Root Bear was adopted by the American A&W chain and its restaurants in Asia. In the United States the previous A&W mascots, the Burger Family, were phased out beginning in 1973. Earlier press materials given to franchisees support the claim that he was created in September 1973. The costume, with an animated-style appearance, was designed by the same company that made costumes for Disneyland. The design cost $25,000 (equivalent to $163,208.50 in 2025).

The Great Root Bear began making public appearances, including television performances, visits to hospitals and schools, and events at the chain's restaurants, starting in the summer of 1974. He also took part in activities related to the Easterseals Telethon in 1976 and 1977. Restaurants handed out Great Root Bear-branded Hocus-Pocus Magic Kits during the campaign.

By 1976, the mascot had become successful, and merchandise such as straws featuring the bear was available. A hand puppet of the bear was introduced during the 1977 Christmas season. In 1978, the company's newsletter, the A&W News Dispenser, was renamed A&W News Bearer. At birthday parties hosted at its restaurants, balloons were called "bearloons" and straws "bearstraws". Beginning in 1975, A&W printed coupons known as "The Great Root Bear Buck" (now "Bear Bucks"), modeled after U.S. dollar notes with Rooty's face in the center.

Until 2012, the mascot had no official name. In its first year of usage in the United States, a franchisee in Walla Walla named him "Rudy" in a newspaper advertisement for take-home gallons of root beer, a name similar to the current Rooty.

The bear also lent his name to a playground, called Bearland, at restaurants in Malaysia starting in 1990. By early 2004, the Bearland playground had lost most of its attractions.

=== In Canada ===
The Great Root Bear, with a distinct design, continued to appear in television commercials for the separate Canadian chain. The Canadian chain registered its own trademark for the mascot in 1978, and on September 11, 1995, for his French name, Grand Ours A&W.

The bear and the tuba jingle that accompanied him became a long-running campaign, created by Griffiths-Gibson of Vancouver (the tune, entitled "Ba-Dum, Ba-Dum", was released as a single in April 1977 by Attic Records, credited to "Major Ursus," a play on Ursa Major, or "great bear"). Composer and B.C. Hall of Fame inductee Miles Ramsay helped compose the song. The jingle was performed by Vancouver jazz, classical, and session trombonist Sharman King and was often accompanied by the slogan "Follow the Great Root Bear to A&W".

During 1997 and 1998, Drew Carey served as a spokesperson for the chain, appearing in TV ads alongside the bear. He was dismissed (with legal action ensuing) after a November 1998 episode of The Drew Carey Show featured Carey eating at a McDonald's location in China.

Following the reintroduction of The Burger Family, the bear was phased out from advertising. Only in 2025 did A&W Canada start officially calling him Rooty, in line with his 50th anniversary. A special birthday party was held at locations in Toronto and Calgary on October 18.

=== Decline and resurgence ===
In 2000, A&W donated 30 teddy bear versions of its mascot to the Bears on Patrol children's safety program in Oakland County, Michigan.

In 2009, as the bear was being downplayed nationally, the Lodi restaurant (owned by Peter Knight) registered the @awrestaurants Twitter username, which the national chain adopted within a couple of years. Some posts in spring 2009 were written in the bear's voice (then unnamed). The mascot also appeared at the opening of a new restaurant in Garden City, Kansas, in early 2009.

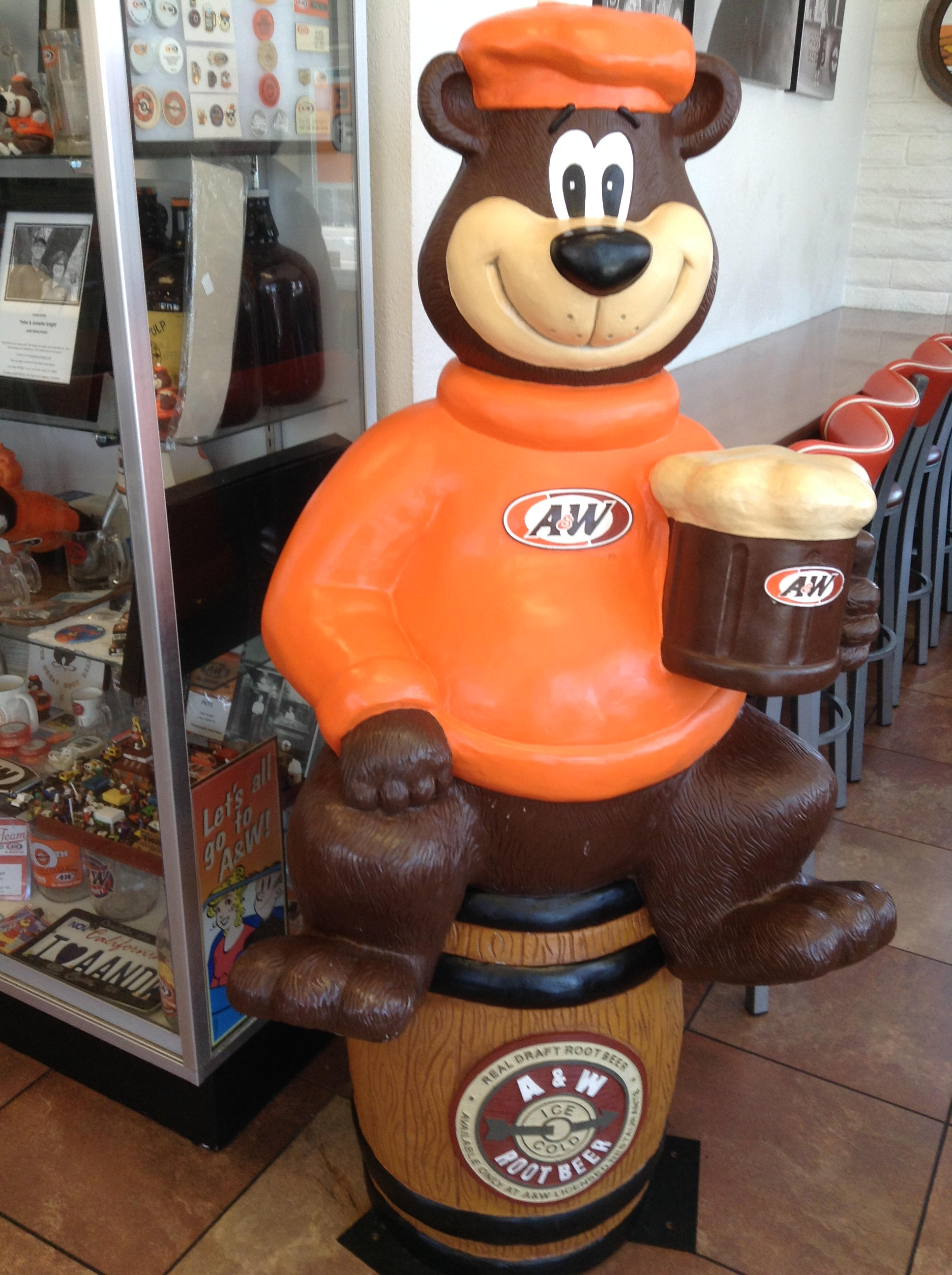
A statue of Rooty holding a mug of root beer while sitting on a barrel

A new administration took over A&W in the United States in 2011. Liz Bazner described it as "criminal" that the chain was not using the mascot and put him in charge of the Twitter account. A bronze statue of the bear holding a mug was erected in the lobby of the new headquarters in Lexington. In March 2012, A&W released a video showing the bear working at the building during construction, with comedic mishaps. Around this time, the name Rooty appeared and became official. In June 2012 (the de facto 93rd anniversary of A&W), Lexington media house uHAPS Media produced a faux news item depicting Rooty emerging from hibernation.

The earliest known use of Rooty as the mascot's name, previously just the Great Root Bear, was a Facebook post on January 30, 2012, in which A&W jokingly signed him up for Skype.

The resurgence formed part of a broader relaunch under the new owners. Liz Bazner, who was in charge of the tweets, created a running joke that Rooty had been "hibernating" before 2012. In January 2013, A&W launched a new website following a new creative marketing agreement with Cornett Integrated Marketing. Executives worked with franchisees in Asia, where the mascot remained prominent, to incorporate him into birthday parties at U.S. restaurants. Rooty also received a Vine account and a smartphone app, "Burping Rooty". A&W's website featured a "bear cam" that "streamed" Rooty's daily activities. Rooty also featured in the first product release on Vine.

In 2013–2014, four episodes of a fictional reality series involving Rooty, The Bear is Back, were released on A&W's YouTube channel, filmed at the company's headquarters.

A CGI version of Rooty was created in 2022 with the aim of being easily rigged for animation and motion capture.

== Personality and role at A&W ==
From the beginning, Rooty was intended to be A&W's "ambassador of fun" or "goodwill ambassador". The chain suggests that Rooty embodies "fun and nostalgia" associated with the brand. He is described as "funny" and "goofy", and was seen as "not polarizing, but lovable". In 1992, a franchisee owner described Rooty as "very fuzzy, very friendly and plump".

Two books published in 1990 described Rooty as "a fun-loving adventurer" and "a friend to children everywhere".

Whether Rooty has a family is unclear. At the entrance of the former A&W restaurant in Petaling Jaya, an illustration of Rooty (seen with a pentagonal hat, akin to the design used by the costume in Malaysia) appears with his supposed wife and two cubs. A 1987 print advertisement for the American branch's lunch boxes in that year's back-to-school season depicted Rooty and his wife behind a cub.

== Controversies ==
=== 2013 LinkedIn scandal ===
In February 2013, Rooty became the first mascot to have a LinkedIn profile. However, LinkedIn removed the profile after about a week on the grounds that Rooty is not real. A&W protested the decision.

=== Rooty pants incident ===
In response to public debate over the sexiness of its Green M&M character, M&M's announced in a January 23, 2023 social media post that it would "indefinitely pause" the use of its "spokescandies" characters. The next day, A&W issued a similarly formatted post.

America, let's talk. Since 1963, Rooty the Great Root Bear has been our beloved spokesbear. We knew people would notice because he's literally a 6-foot tall bear wearing an orange sweater. But now we get it — even a mascot's lack of pants can be polarizing. Therefore, we have decided that Rooty will wear jeans going forward.

— A&W, January 24, 2023

Though intended as a parody of the M&M's post, A&W's intent was not immediately clear, and some believed the pants change to be true. Segments on Fox News and Fox Business presented it as real news, with one host exclaiming "the woke police cancel culture has gone ridiculous!" A&W clarified that the post was a joke and that no changes were planned for Rooty's outfit.

== See also ==
- List of American advertising characters
- The Burger Family
