= A&W (Canada) =

Canadian fast food restaurant chain

A&W Food Services of Canada Inc.

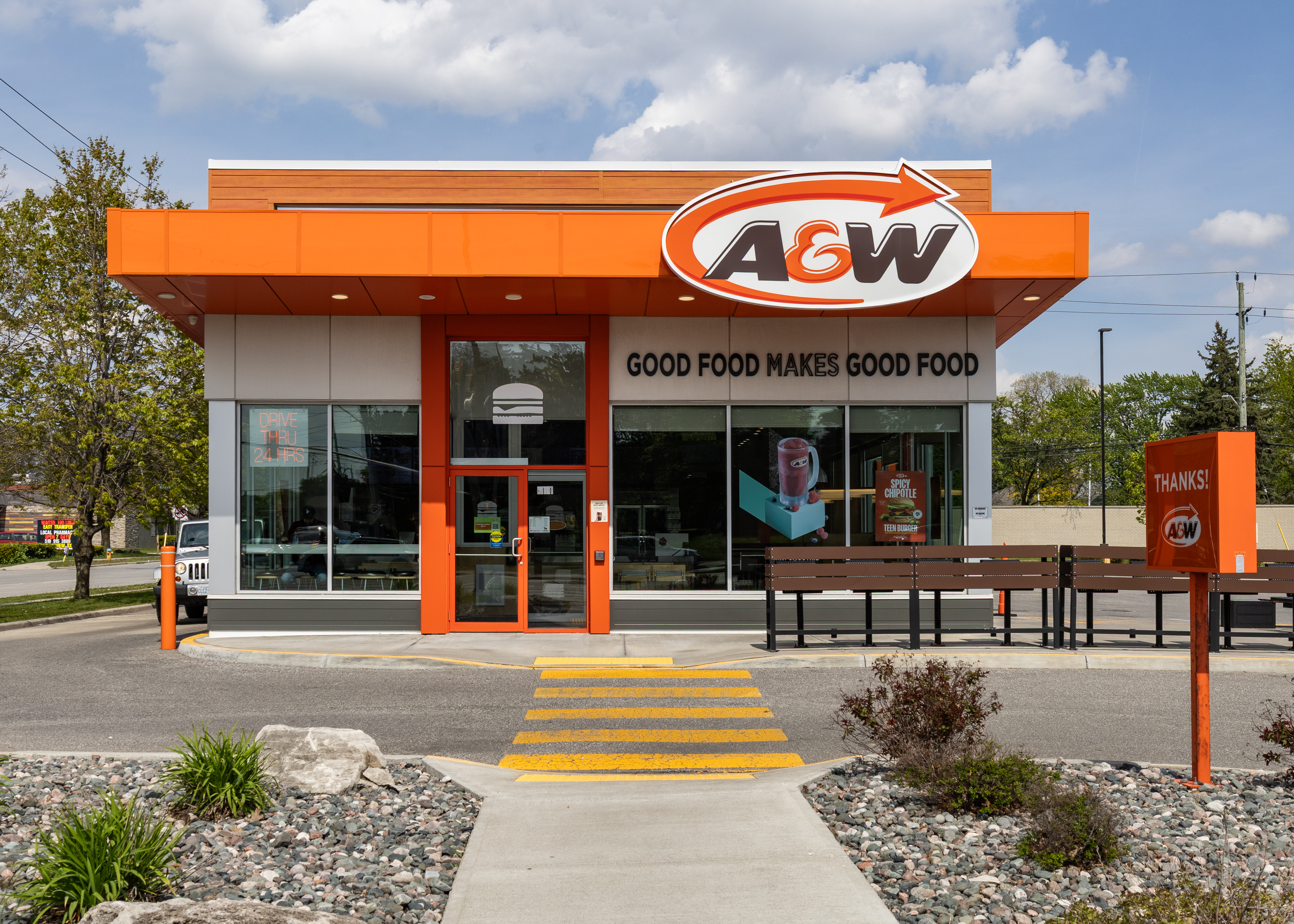
- Type: Public
- Traded as: TSX: AW (A&W Food Services of Canada Inc.)
- Industry: Restaurant
- Founded: 1956; 70 years ago
- Headquarters: 171 Esplanade West, North Vancouver, British Columbia
- Number of locations: 1,029
- Area served: Canada
- Key people: Susan Senecal (CEO & president)
- Products: Root beer, hamburgers, chicken burgers, veggie burgers, onion rings, french fries, sweet potato fries, breakfast items, fried chicken, and previously, hot dogs
- Revenue: CA$1.34 billion (2020)
- Net income: CA$28 million (2020)
- Number of employees: 20,000 (2020)
- Parent: A&W Restaurants (1956–1972); Unilever (1972–1995); A&W Trade Marks Limited Partnership (Trademark only)
- Website: aw.ca

A&W is a fast-food restaurant chain in Canada, franchised by A&W Food Services of Canada Inc.

The company was initially a subsidiary of the U.S.-based A&W Restaurants chain, with the subsidiary opening its first franchise in Winnipeg in 1956. In 1972, Unilever acquired A&W's Canadian operations, leading to the subsidiary's separation from the U.S.-based company. In 1995, a Canadian management group made up of A&W franchisees took ownership of the chain from Unilever.

A&W Food Services of Canada Inc. is a publicly traded company headquartered in North Vancouver. As of 2022, A&W was Canada's second-largest fast-food hamburger chain, with 1,029 franchises, after McDonald's.

== History ==
The first Canadian A&W restaurant opened in Winnipeg, Manitoba, in 1956. It spread across Canada with over 200 locations in the next ten years. The Canadian restaurants were part of the American chain until 1972 when they were sold to Unilever.

In 1975, facing competition from the growing Canadian operations of McDonald's, the company launched an advertising campaign starring an orange-clad mascot, The Great Root Bear. The bear and the tuba jingle that accompanied him became a long-running campaign (the tune, entitled "Ba-Dum, Ba-Dum", was released as a single by Attic Records, credited to "Major Ursus", a play on Ursa Major or "great bear"). The famous Canadian composer and B.C. Hall of Fame winner Robert Buckley helped compose the song. The mascot was so successful that he was eventually adopted as the mascot by the American A&W chain as well. The famous tuba jingle was played by famed Vancouver jazz, classical and session trombonist Sharman King.

In the early 1980s, the drive-in style of restaurant was phased out. It was replaced with a modern, pastel-coloured fast food outlet which included marginally healthier options. While the chain continued to open some standalone restaurants, A&W also aggressively pursued shopping mall locations, and as a result A&Ws are still commonly found in Canadian malls of various sizes.

=== Management buyout and retro theming (1995–2001) ===
In 1995, the chain was bought from Unilever by senior management. During 1997 and 1998, Drew Carey served as a spokesperson for the chain, appearing in TV ads alongside the Great Root Bear; he was dismissed (with legal action ensuing) after a November 1998 episode of The Drew Carey Show featured Carey eating at a McDonald's location in China.

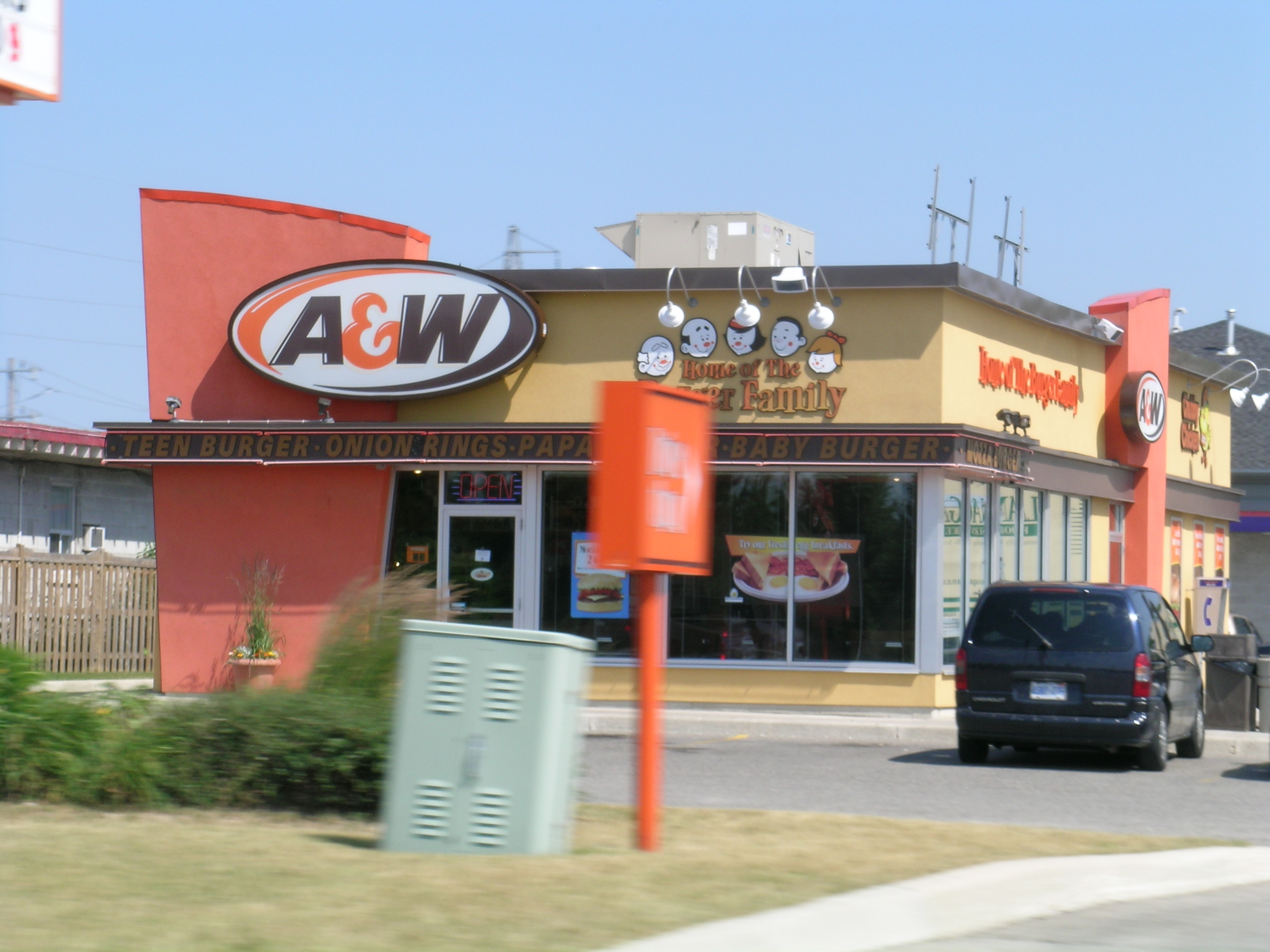
A standalone A&W restaurant with bright orange and yellow exterior in Stratford, Ontario, in 2007

By the end of the 1990s, marketing and products began to take on a more retro approach. Former menu items, such as the Burger Family, were reintroduced, and marketing became more targeted toward the baby boomer generation. The Great Root Bear and (in English Canada) the "ba-dum ba-dum" theme were also retired from most advertising (the tuba theme is still used in French-language ads). A new restaurant design was introduced, featuring a bright orange and yellow exterior, reminiscent of the 1950s, while the interior is decorated with memorabilia associated with the same period. Existing restaurants were renovated to match the new style. Meanwhile, with malls in decline, A&W began to focus on opening new standalone restaurants, particularly in smaller markets where McDonald's was often the only major hamburger chain. The last drive-in style restaurant closed in 2000, in Langley, British Columbia.

=== Stock market listing and "Good Food" focus (2002–present) ===
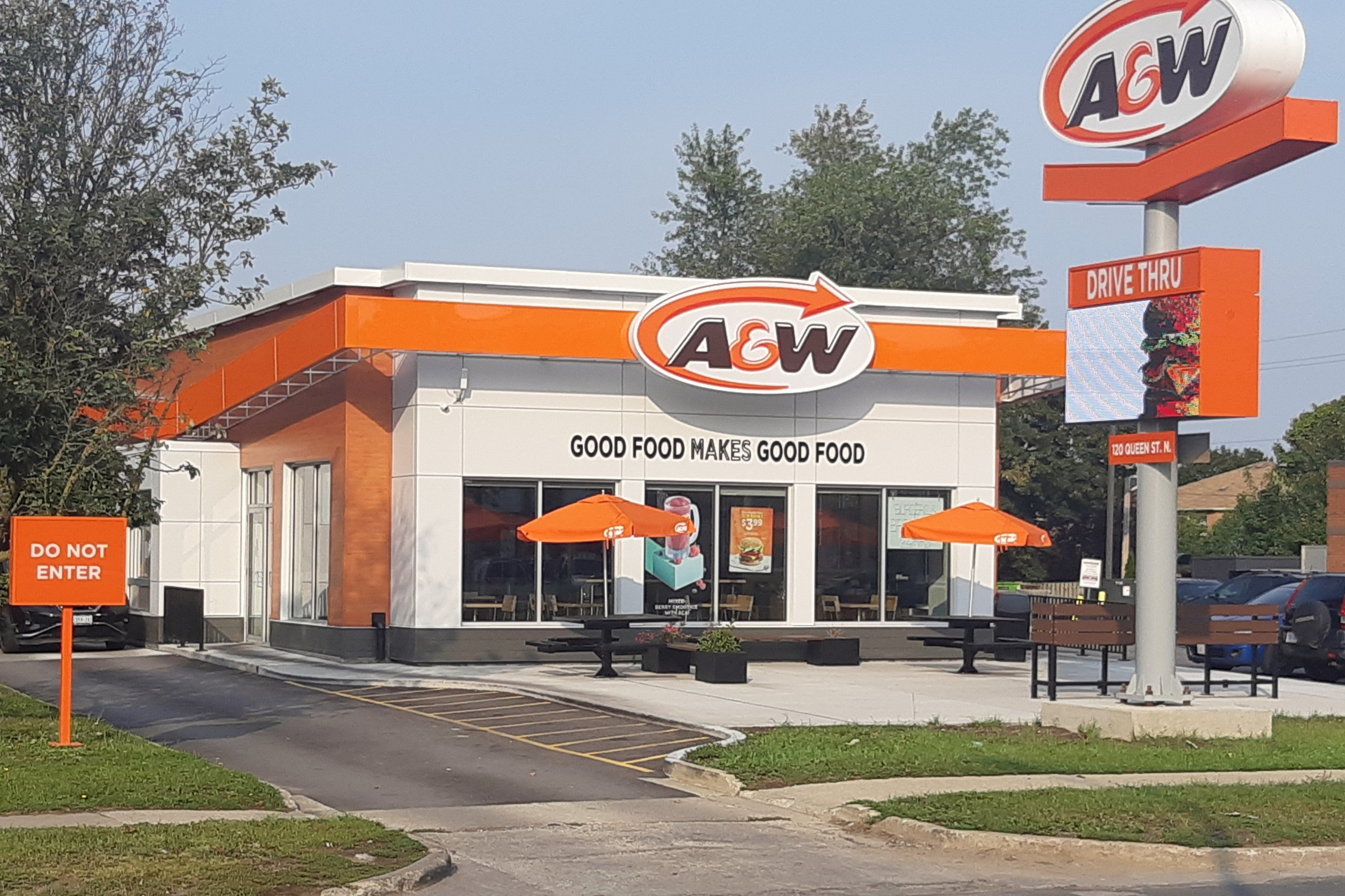
A standalone A&W restaurant in Tottenham, Ontario, in 2022

On February 15, 2002, the A&W Revenue Royalties Income Fund was listed on the Toronto Stock Exchange. The initial public offering was 8.34 million units at $10 each. The fund owns the A&W trademarks in Canada and licenses them to A&W Food Services of Canada Inc. Revenue is generated by charging a three percent royalty on gross sales of each restaurant. Television advertisements are filmed at locations in the Fraser Valley. In June 2006, A&W celebrated 50 years in Canada. Some Quebec A&W locations were co-branded with Dunkin' Donuts until Dunkin' Donuts closed most locations in Quebec.

Two new restaurant concepts were introduced in the fall of 2009. The new standalone restaurant design is ultra modern but with some architectural markings reminiscent of the design in the earlier buildings erect from A&W back in time. There is also a new separate format for urban (i.e., downtown) locations, where some of the baby-boomer aspects are scaled back in favour of a more modern look. On November 21, 2013, the chain opened its 800th location in downtown Montreal. The company's advertising also shifted to a focus on animal welfare, such as chicken and beef raised without antibiotics.

In February 2018, Susan Senecal became the company's chief executive officer.

In June 2018, A&W announced that they were replacing plastic straws in their locations with paper ones, becoming the first fast food chain in North America to make the switch.

In 2019, senior executives from A&W, presenting at a conference organized by LabourWatch, were recorded sharing the anti-union measures that the franchisor allegedly takes when made aware of potential unionization activity at any franchisee or corporate-owned locations. Nancy Wuttunee, the Vice President, People Potential and Mike Atkinson, then-Regional Vice President, Eastern Canada, divulged that A&W's Home Office keeps a "'watch list' of franchises that are 'high risk for unionizing'" and that, when alerted of potential unionization efforts, Wuttunee described that the company has a “fire drill” reaction, which is "a rapid-response 'crisis management process' for responding to things that 'worry us.'" News of the presentation was released by PressProgress (a left-wing news site launched by the Broadbent Institute, a social democratic think tank in Canada). Some local politicians in Toronto, where the conference took place, criticized the company and its executives' remarks, including Toronto City Councillor Gord Perks who tweeted "Hey [A&W Canada], I'm never buying from you again, and I will tell as many people as I can to avoid you too. Canadians have a constitutional right to bargain collectively. Leave Canada." A&W continues to grow its number of locations within the province of Ontario and Atkinson is now the dedicated Vice President, Ontario.

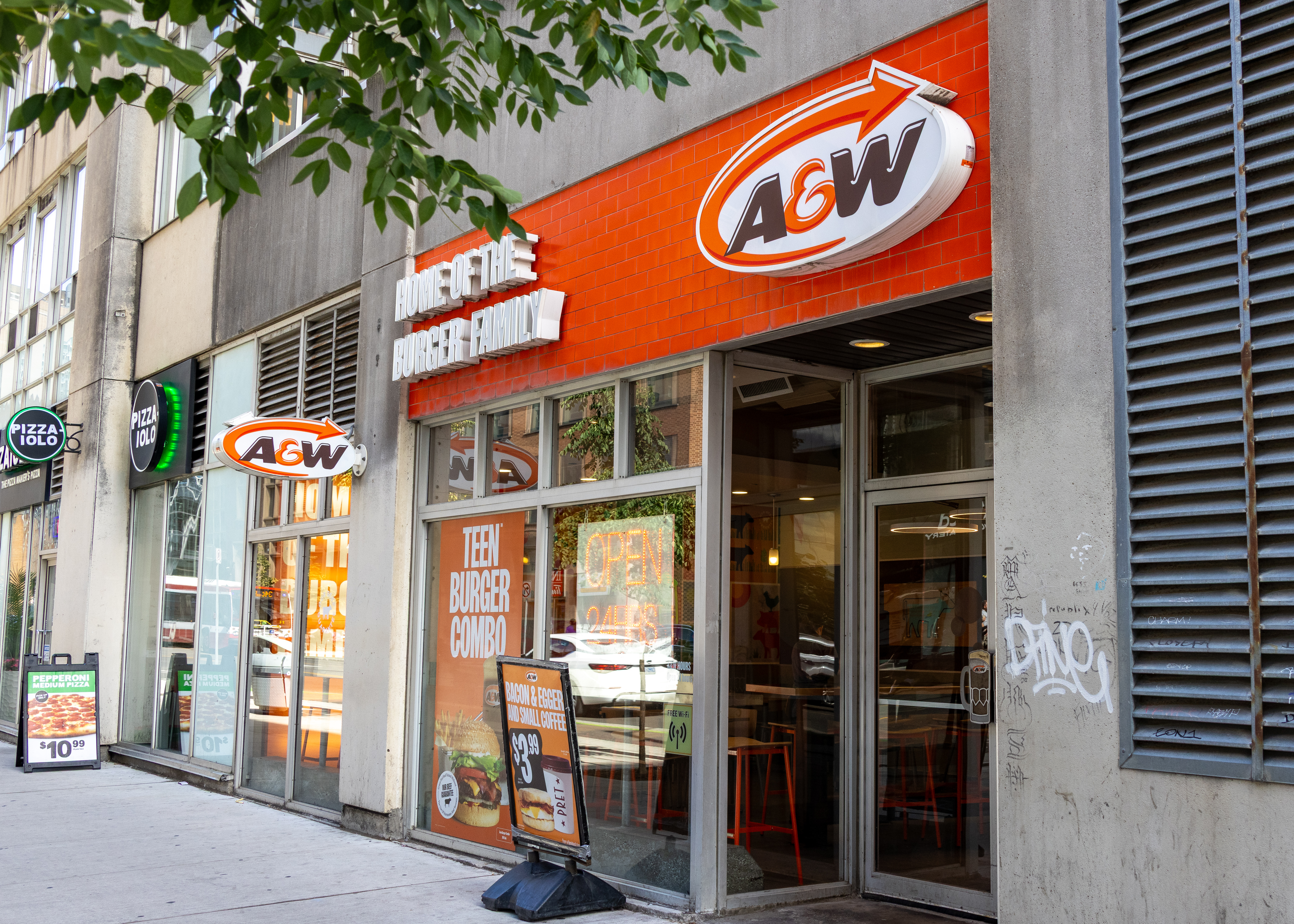
An A&W Restaurant in Midtown Toronto, in 2025

On July 22, 2024, the company announced via press release that A&W Food Services of Canada and the A&W Revenue Royalties Income Fund "have agreed to a strategic combination," which will lead to a new publicly traded QSR franchisor entitled A&W Food Services NewCo. The transaction was expected to close in October 2024, pending approval of the TSX and regulatory approval under the Competition Act (Canada).

== Products ==
Apart from the namesake brand of root beer, the A&W menu is focused on "The Burger Family", a lineup of hamburgers introduced by the U.S. A&W chain in the early 1960s, mostly discontinued in the 1980s in favour of a more standard menu, then reintroduced in Canada and expanded upon beginning in the late 1990s.

=== The Burger Family ===
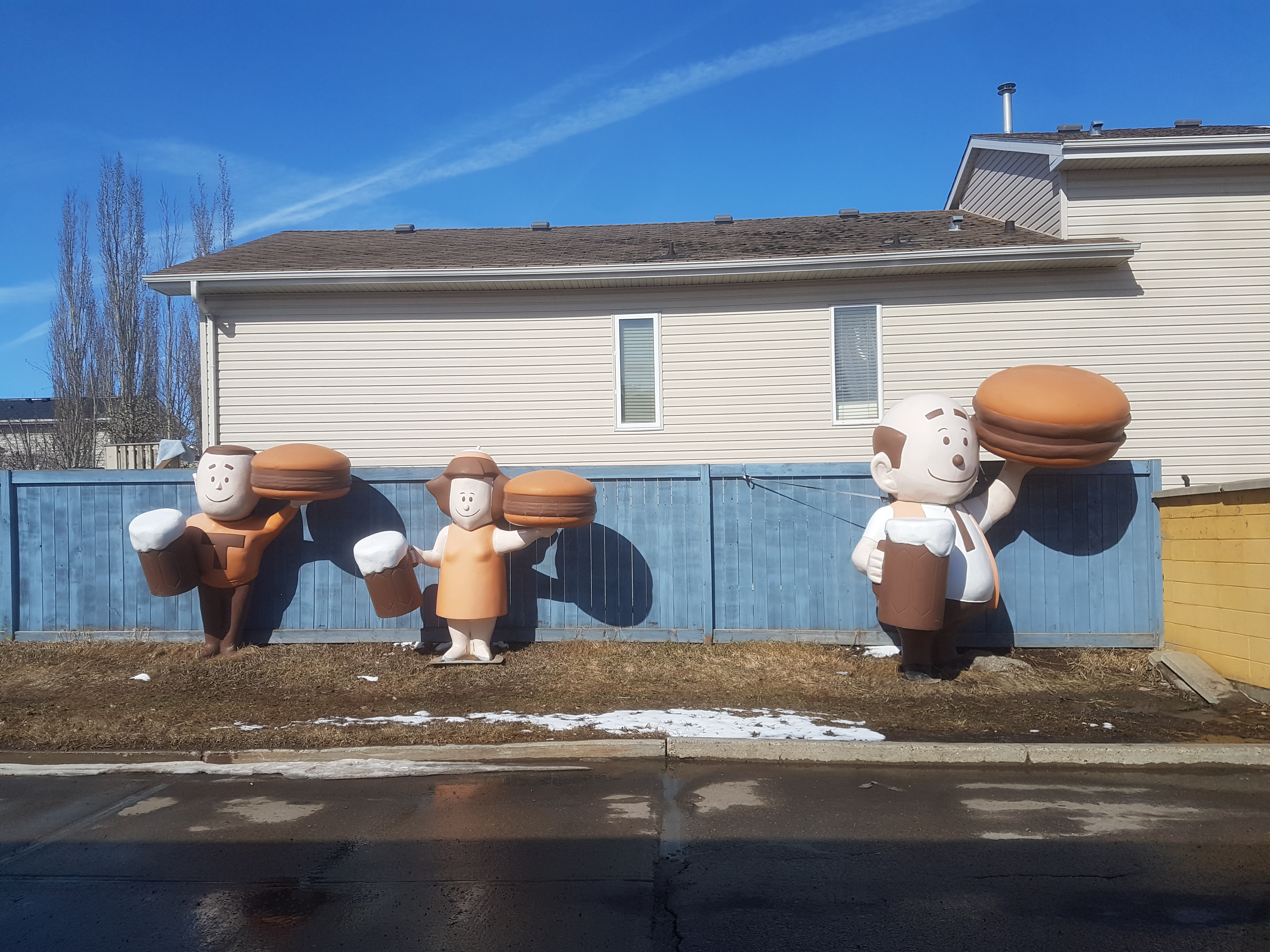
Displays of "The Burger Family" outside an A&W in Morinville, Alberta, in 2022

The original Burger Family lineup consists of the Baby, Mama, Teen, and Papa burgers. They are still sold today along with other burgers named after other family members:

- Baby Burger: small beef patty (1.6 ounces (45 g)), ketchup, unseeded hamburger bun, (optional) cheese slice
- Mama Burger: regular beef patty (3 ounces (85 g)), onion slice, pickles, ketchup, mustard, Teen Sauce, sesame seed bun, (optional) cheese slice
- Teen Burger: regular beef patty (3 ounces (85 g)), onion slice, pickles, ketchup, mustard, bacon, Teen Sauce, lettuce, tomato, sesame seed bun, cheese slice
- Papa Burger: two regular beef patties (6 ounces (170 g) total), onion slice, pickles, ketchup, mustard, Teen Sauce, sesame seed bun, (optional) cheese slice
- Grandpa Burger: three regular beef patties (9 ounces (260 g) total), onion slice, pickles, ketchup, mustard, Teen Sauce, sesame seed bun, (optional) cheese slice

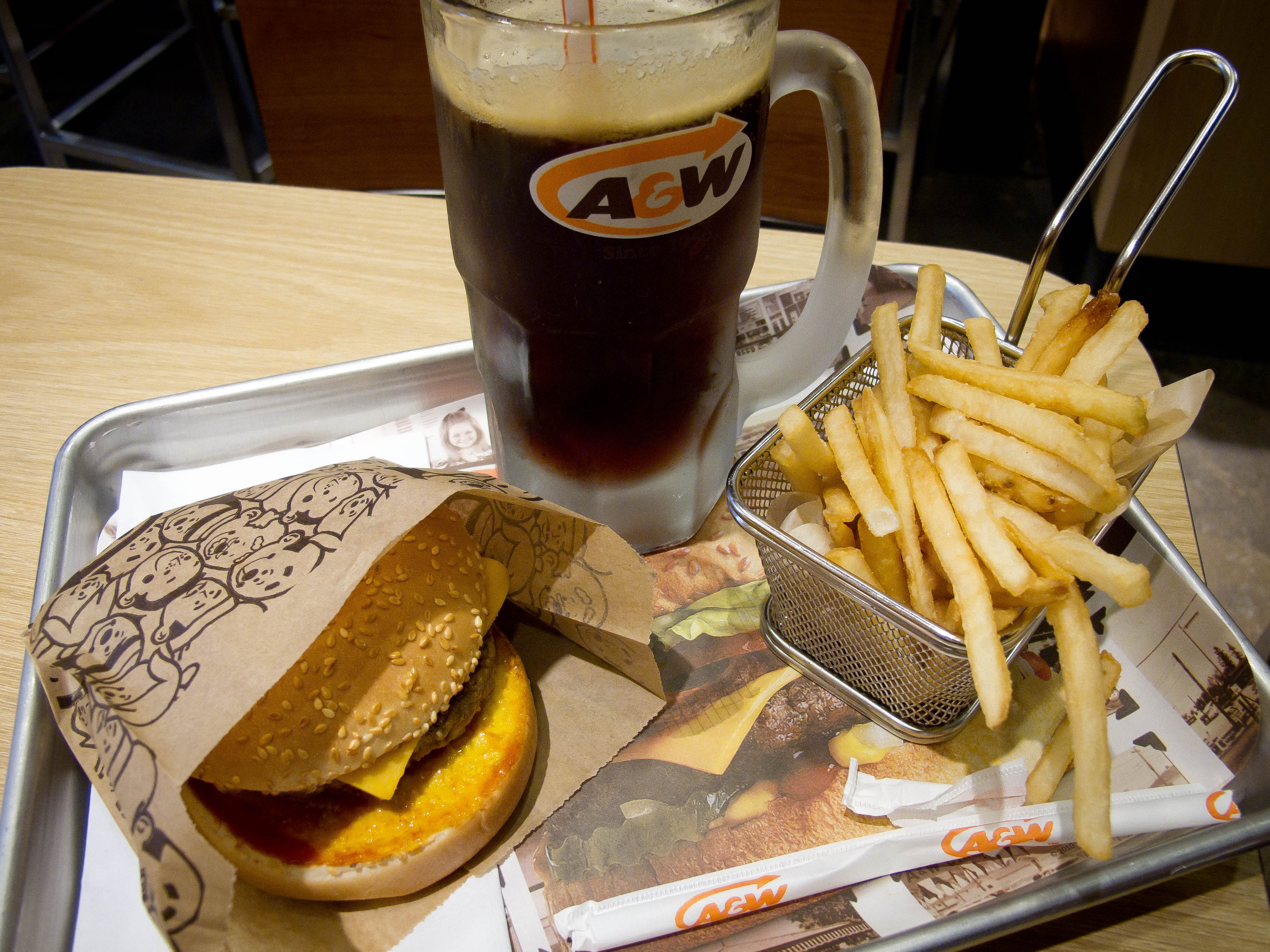
An Uncle Burger, french fries, and root beer in Okanagan, British Columbia, in February 2011

- Uncle Burger: large beef patty (5 ounces (140 g)), red onion slice, pickles, ketchup, Chubby mayo, Uncle Sauce, lettuce, tomato, sesame seed bun, cheese slice x2
- Double Teen Burger regular beef patty (3 ounces (85 g)×2), onion slice, pickles, ketchup, mustard, bacon, Teen Sauce, lettuce, tomato, sesame seed bun, cheese slice

Discontinued members of the Burger Family include the Grandma Burger, a prime rib burger topped with caramelized onions and horseradish sauce; and the Sirloin Burger Twins, which were a pair of sliders.

=== Chubby Chicken ===
Another 1960s-era offering, Chubby Chicken, returned to the menu shortly after the reintroduction of the Burger Family. Chubby burgers are breaded all white-meat chicken breasts. There are three varieties offered:

- The Original Chubby Burger which is made on sesame seed bun, and comes with Chubby Mayo (Hellmann's Mayo), and lettuce.
- The Spicy Habanero Chicken Burger is made on a seeded bun with a spicy chicken portion, and comes with jalapeño aioli, lettuce and tomato.
- BLT Chubby Burger is made on a 7-grain bun, and comes with Chubby Mayo (Hellmann's Mayo), two slices of bacon, lettuce, and tomato.

These can be ordered by themselves, or in combos. They also offer all white-meat chicken strips which come in either 3 or 5, by themselves, or in combos. The chicken strips may also be ordered in wraps such as the "Chipotle Chicken wrap" and the "Bacon Ranch wrap". Some locations used to offer fried chicken bone-in pieces however, the bone in chicken was discontinued as an optional item in 2020.

=== Value Menu ===
In 2012, A&W introduced its first value burger, the Buddy Burger, and its double patty variant, the Double Buddy burger. Both can be ordered with or without cheese. The release of the Buddy burger made A&W more competitive against McDonald's, who already had value burgers like the McDouble.

In 2015, A&W piloted the new Chicken Buddy burger at some select locations. It was successful and was added to the value menu permanently in 2016.

- Buddy Burger: one or two small beef patties (1.6 ounces (45 g)), mustard, ketchup, Teen Sauce, grilled onions, unseeded hamburger bun; available in double or single patty versions, and with cheese or without cheese.
- Chicken Buddy Burger: one or two breaded chicken patties, mayonnaise, pickles, unseeded hamburger bun; value burgers, available in double or single patty versions

=== Breakfast ===
A&W launched a revamped version of their breakfast offering in the summer of 2014. In addition to the Bacon N' Egger (called Chef-d'œuf in Quebec), Sausage N' Egger, and Classic Bacon N' Eggs, they launched several new items including The All-Canadian Special and pancakes. Customers can choose to have their breakfast sandwiches made with either English muffins or with buns. In 2017, A&W announced that it would offer their breakfast sandwiches as part of an All-Day Breakfast Menu to compete with McDonald's.

=== Beyond Meat ===
In July 2018, A&W locations began serving Beyond Meat's vegan Beyond Burger. The chain had a shortage of the Beyond Burger in August 2018, but announced that all locations would receive stock by October 2018. In 2019 A&W expanded its Beyond Meat offerings with the release of the Beyond Meat Sausage N' Egger.

- Beyond Meat Burger: Beyond Meat patty, mustard, ketchup, mayonnaise, red onion, pickles, lettuce, tomato, sesame seed bun, A&W seasoning
- Beyond Meat Sausage N' Egger: Beyond Meat sausage patty, margarine, egg, cheddar cheese, English muffin

=== Other products ===
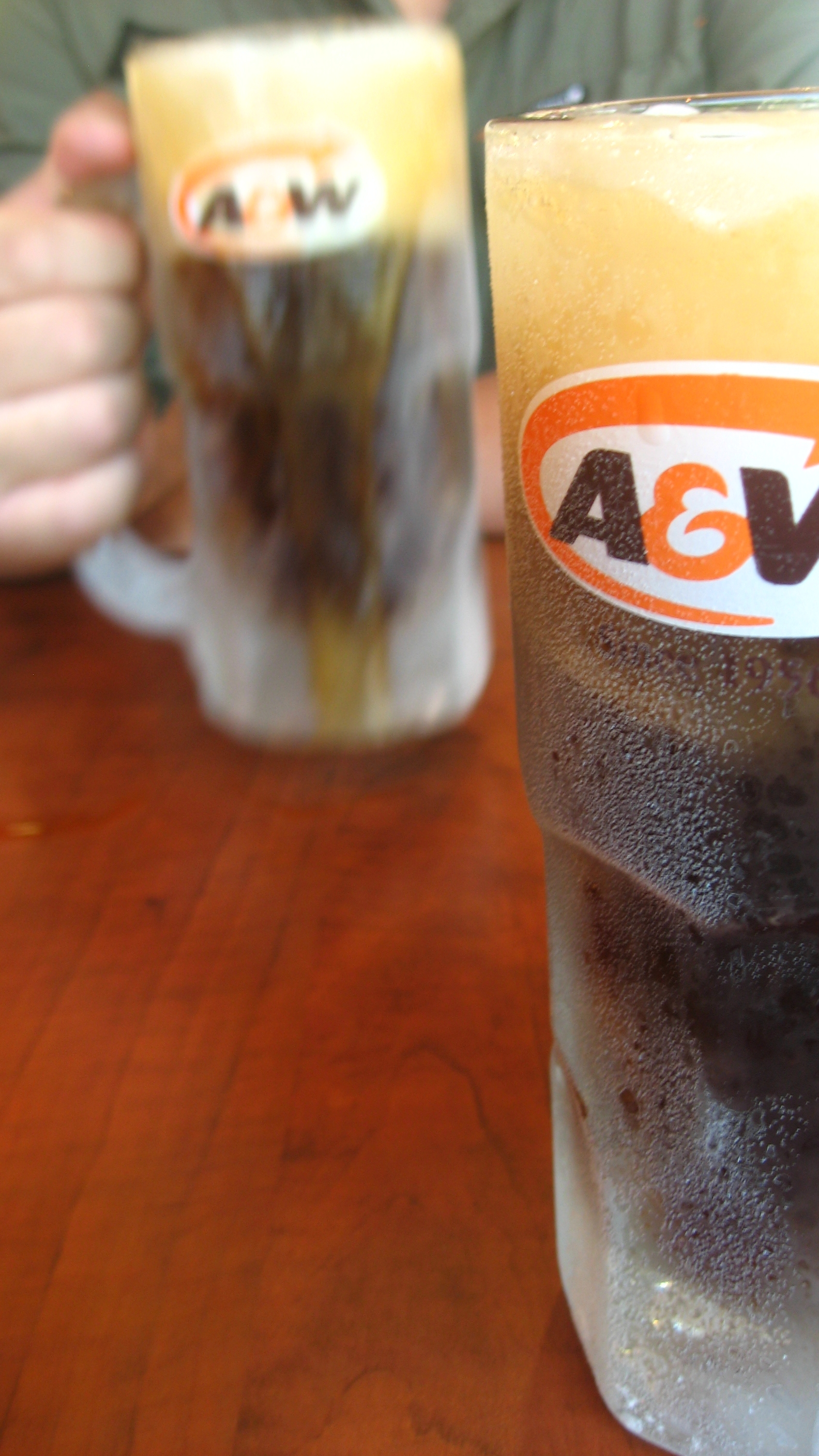
Glasses of A&W Root Beer in British Columbia, 2010

A&W also sells their Mozza Burger, which is not part of the burger family nor the value menu. It consists of a beef patty, lettuce, tomato, bacon, mozzarella cheese, and their special Mozza sauce on a sesame seed bun.

Discontinued offerings include Bone-in Chubby Chicken (sold in 2-3 piece combos, buckets of 10, with a "family box" of fries/onion rings, and a side of potato salad/coleslaw (also discontinued options)), discontinued members of the Burger Family: Grandma Burger, a prime rib burger topped with caramelized onions and horseradish sauce; and the Sirloin Burger Twins, which were a pair of sliders, the Veggie Deluxe (veggie burger with mozzarella cheese, lettuce, tomato, onion, and pickles), traditional hot dogs, and the Whistle Dog (topped with cheese and bacon).

The ketchup and mustard served at A&W location are processed by French's at their Ontario facility and use only Canadian ingredients.

The Whistle Dog, a hot dog dressed with cheese, bacon and relish, was available in Canada, but was discontinued at the end of 2016; the regular hot dog was similarly discontinued. In July 2022, all Canadian A&W locations brought back the Whistle Dog for a limited time.

=== Divergences with A&W (Great American Brand) ===
The Canadian menu diverges significantly from their international counterparts franchised through A Great American Brand. This divergence is due to the brand's separate management and ownership. The only Burger Family product available by name in U.S. locations is the Papa Burger. The Papa Burger differs significantly between Canada and the U.S. Notable products on the U.S. menu not available in Canada include deep-fried cheese curds and soft serve-based products such as sundaes.

== Animal welfare ==
The chicken and eggs served at A&W are from hens who lived in enriched cages and were fed a vegetarian diet, as chickens are omnivores. Antibiotics are only used in the company's animals when medically necessary, and those animals are taken out of production. Moreover, A&W claimed to be trying to use 100% open housing by 2021. A&W has also announced plans for their meat production to meet Global Animal Partnership's level 2 certification, but did not provide a timeline.

== Trademark ==
The A&W trademarks are owned by A&W Trade Marks Limited Partnership. The Partnership licenses the trademarks to A&W Food Services of Canada Inc. in exchange for a royalty of 3% of the sales of A&W restaurants in Canada. A&W Food Services owns ~21% of A&W Trade Marks Inc. which is the sole general partner in the Partnership, while the rest is owned by A&W Revenue Royalties Income Fund.

== See also ==
- List of hamburger restaurants
