= The High Road to China (book) =

2007 book by Kate Teltscher

The High Road to China: George Bogle, the Panchen Lama and the First British Expedition to Tibet
- Author: Kate Teltscher
- Language: English
- Subject: History
- Genre: Nonfiction
- Published: 2007
- Publisher: Bloomsbury
- Publication place: United Kingdom
- Media type: Hardcover
- Pages: 374
- ISBN: 9780747584841

The High Road to China: George Bogle, the Panchen Lama and the First British Expedition to Tibet is a nonfiction book by Kate Teltscher, a historian and academician at the University of Roehampton.

== Overview ==
In 1774, merchants from the British East India Company (EIC) were very eager to start trading with Tibet and China. To assess Tibet's commercial potential and Lhasa's relationship with China, Warren Hastings, then Governor-General of Bengal, dispatched twenty-eight year old Scotsman George Bogle to Tibet to act as an envoy on their behalf.

The EIC was crippled by a combination of a growing domestic demand for Chinese goods and China's extremely restrictive trading practices. The Imperial court's arrogance had to be overcome in order to open up trade, and a diplomatic opening with the Tibetans seemed to provide an opportunity to initiate bilateral trade talks with China.

Once Bogle reached Lhasa, he was able to form a friendship with the Panchen Lama of that time. This friendship and persuasion from Bogle led to Panchen Lama's state visit to China, which was a major focus for the Britishers.

By piecing together fragments from Bogle's private documents, Tibetan histories of the Panchen Lama, the testimony of a travelling Hindu monk, and the Emperor's own accounts, Teltscher tried to "[reconstruct] the momentous meeting of these very different worlds."

== Reception ==
Tristram Stuart wrote in The New York Times that "[the book] lucidly relates how Britain tried to circumvent trade barriers by opening a back door to China through the mysterious land of Tibet."

Patrick French, a British historian, wrote in The Sunday Times: "A splendid and fascinating account [...] Teltscher has made remarkable use of her source material, aided by the constantly perceptive and witty tone of Bogle’s own writings."

Noel Malcolm, wrote in The Sunday Telegraph: "An impeccably well-researched book, and it is hard to imagine this fascinating story being told with greater sensitivity or skill."
