= Hidden Creek Park East =

Municipal park in Hillsboro, Oregon

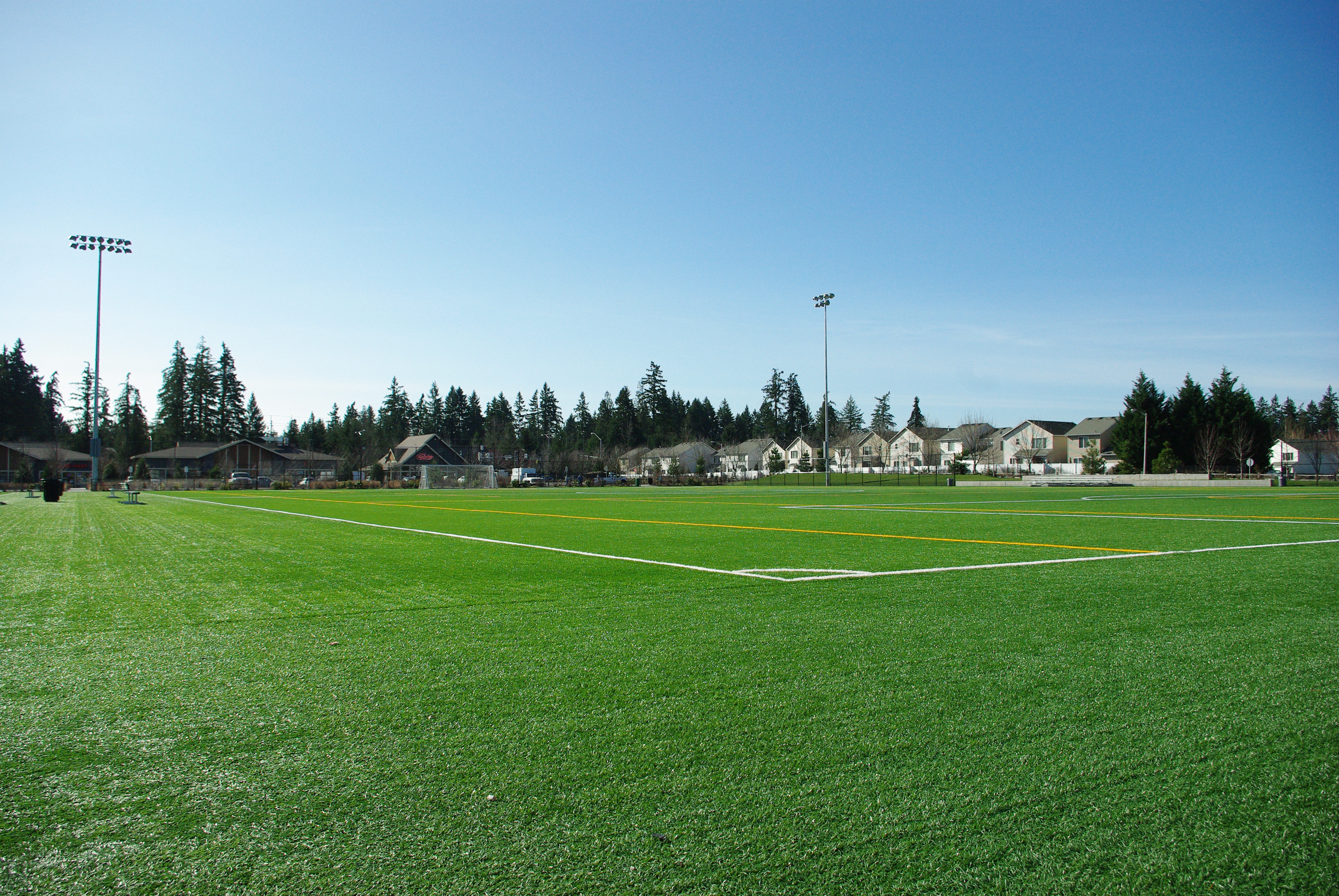
- Sports fields at the park
- Interactive map of Hidden Creek Park East
- Type: Public, city
- Location: Hillsboro, Oregon; United States
- Coordinates: 45°31′16″N 122°55′42″W
- Area: 43.5 acres (176,000 m^{2})
- Created: 2008
- Operator: Hillsboro Parks & Recreation Department
- Status: Open
- Website: https://www.hillsboro-oregon.gov/Home/Components/FacilityDirectory/FacilityDirectory/54/3979

Hidden Creek Park East, formerly known as 53rd Avenue Community Park, is a municipal park in Hillsboro, Oregon, United States. Partially opened in 2008, the park covers 43.5 acres (17.6 ha) along northeast 53rd Avenue in the middle of the city. The park includes two multi-purpose sports fields covered with artificial turf along with basketball courts, tennis courts, and a water fountain. Its neighboring park, Hidden Creek Park West, contains an indoor recreation center which include exercise facilities and a gymnasium along with outdoor park items that include children's play equipment, a combined futsal/pickleball court, and walking trails. Plans call for an aquatics center to be built in the near future. Land for both parks were purchased from exercise equipment maker Soloflex beginning in 2001.

== History ==
Hillsboro began negotiating with Soloflex in January 2001 to purchase 21 acres (8.5 ha) owned by the company. The company was asking for $5 million for the land along northeast 53rd Avenue near Intel's Hawthorn Farm campus. By February the city had purchased the land for a future park. A second parcel was purchased from Soloflex in 2004 and brought the total land at the site to 33 acres (13 ha), with a total of $6.7 million paid for the land.

In June 2005, the city agreed to purchase eight more acres from Soloflex that included a 44,000-square-foot (4,100 m^{2}) building for $3.3 million pending a feasibility study. The city planned to convert the building and the other park land into a recreation complex that would include amenities such as indoor basketball and tennis courts, workout rooms, and possibly a pool. The deal was approved in August, and Hillsboro used money from system development fees to purchase all of the land at the park site.

Planning for the park began in 2006, with the city hoping to begin construction by 2007. Plans called for the park to be developed in phases, with early cost estimates for the first phase at up to $7 million. The plans called for a community park at the site along with an indoor recreation center. The park plans proposed building sports fields, a dog park, tennis and basketball courts, paths, play equipment, and garden space among other items. The city took input from over 100 residents during the planning process. Total costs for the entire project were estimated at between $44 million and $51 million, with construction to occur in four phases.

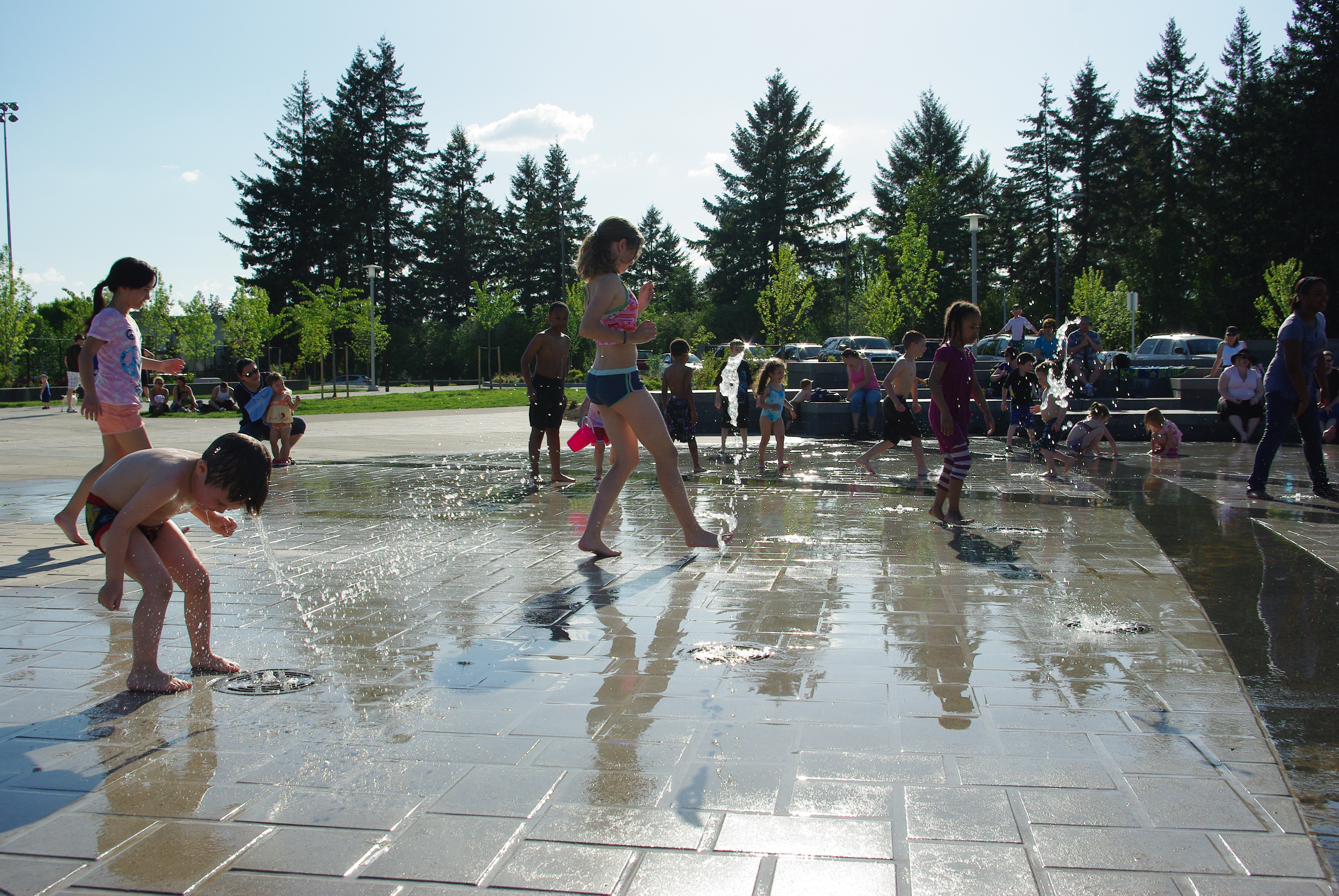
Children playing in the water feature

Plans for a dog park at the site were dropped in July 2006 when the city decided to build what became Hondo Dog Park at a different location. Plans for 53rd Avenue Park were completed by December 2006, but construction did not begin as the city examined how to pay for the park's construction. Funding for the first phase began to take shape in 2007 when the state gave Hillsboro a $500,000 grant from lottery funds for the initial construction. This phase would cost $4 million and develop 10 acres (40,000 m^{2}) at the 41-acre (170,000 m^{2}) park with amenities including sports fields, two tennis courts, restrooms, parking, two basketball courts, lighting, and a courtyard that would include a fountain. The Hillsboro Soccer Club also pledged $10,000 towards the project. Construction began that year with the installation of an artificial turf covering to soccer fields.

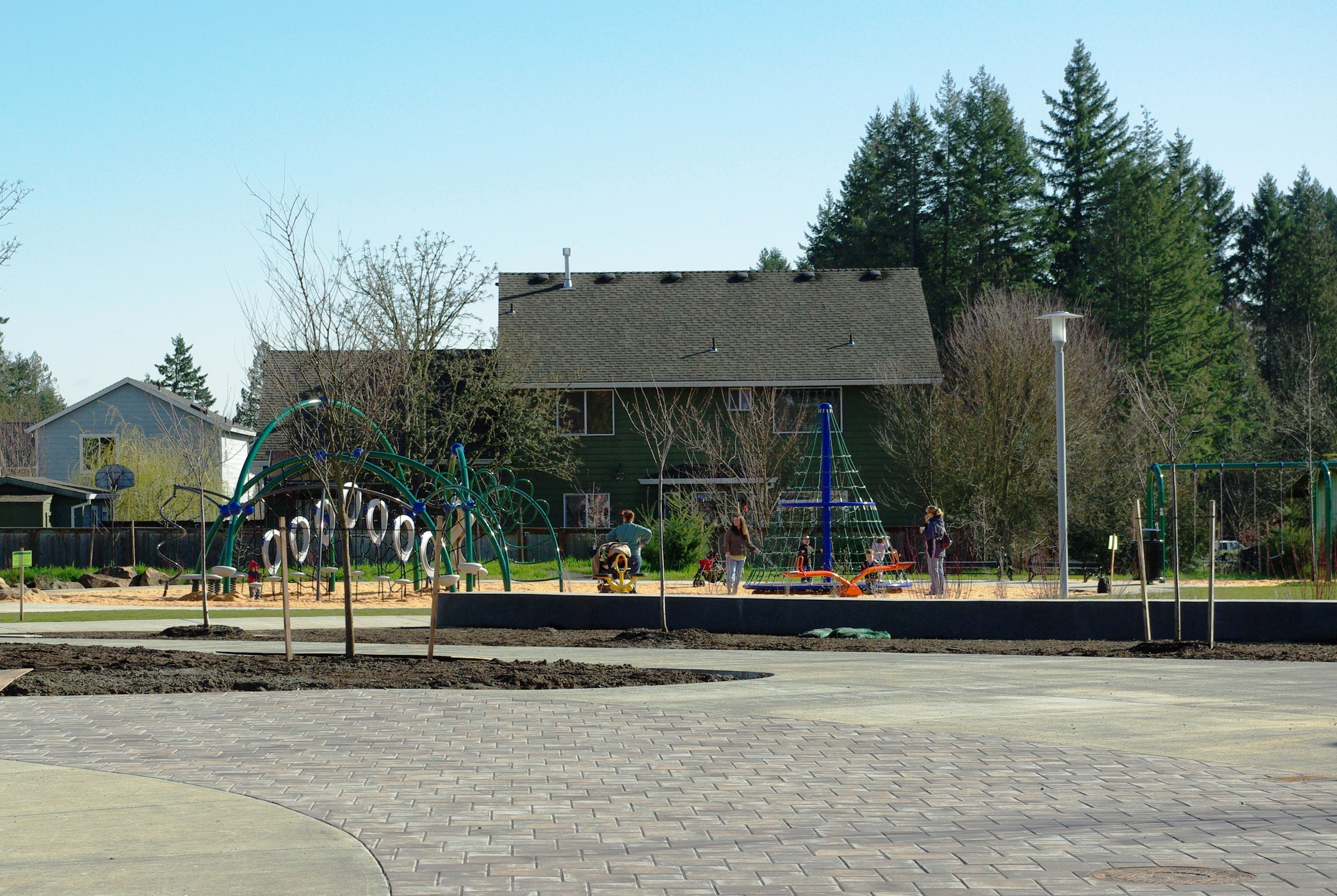
Playground at the park

The city then proposed using a bond to fund nearly $40 million of the project that would go mainly toward building the indoor recreation center at the cite. The first phase of the indoor recreation center would include a soccer field, a pool, basketball courts, a climbing wall, and workout facilities that would open at the end of 2010 if the bond measure was passed by voters. A later expansion was planned to add an Olympic-size swimming pool. In June 2008, the FieldTurf installation was completed and construction began on restrooms and concession stands at the park, and the next month the fields opened for use.

In July 2008, the city council approved putting a $44.5 million bond measure on the fall ballot, with $39.5 million of those funds earmarked for use at 53rd Avenue Park to build the recreation center. The bond would pay for a 121,000-square-foot (11,200 m^{2}) facility if passed, with plans calling for later expansion to include other items such as racquetball courts, an indoor skatepark, and an indoor golf area. The bond measure was defeated in November 2008. The concession stands and restrooms were completed in Spring 2009, and construction of the remaining parts of the first phase began. Amenities such as the interactive water fountain, outdoor basketball courts, and parking were scheduled to be completed by the winter of 2009.

In September 2009, the city began looking at the park again to determine how they would proceed with developing the remained of the park including examining how to pay for it and if design changes were needed to reduce the costs. The following month the city solicited ideas for a new name for the park, as the official name had been 53rd Avenue Community Park. Hillsboro parks decided to go with the slightly shorter name of 53rd Avenue Park in January 2010.

== Amenities ==
The park includes a multi-sport FieldTurf artificial surface sports field. This is the size of two soccer fields and includes lighting for nighttime use. Other amenities are public restrooms and a concessions area.
