= The High Road to China (The Drew Carey Show) =

- The Drew Carey Show episode
- Episode no.: Season 4 Episode 9
- Directed by: Gerry Cohen
- Written by: Katherine Green
- Production code: 467508
- Original air date: November 18, 1998

Guest appearances
- Lin Liu as Ming; James Hong as the Government Worker; Ming Lo as the Manager; Nghia Luu as the Cashier; Harrison Liu as the Chinese Worker; Wang Tiao Tiao as the Kid; Kong Rui as the Ox Cart Driver; Zhen Li Qiang as the Policeman; Yang Sheng Yi as the Crowd Person

Episode chronology
← Previous "Drew's New Car"	Next → "Drew's Dance Party"

"The High Road to China" is the ninth episode of the fourth season of the American sitcom The Drew Carey Show, and the 83rd overall. The episode's plot sees Drew (Drew Carey) stranded in China without money or his passport by his enemy Mimi Bobeck (Kathy Kinney), after he plays an elaborate practical joke on her. Drew finds help from Ming (Lin Liu), a local woman who speaks English, who offers him shelter and a job. Meanwhile, Drew's friends struggle to come up with a plan to get him back home to Cleveland.

The episode was written by Katherine Green and directed by Gerry Cohen. It first aired on November 18, 1998, on the ABC network in the United States. The episode explored the cultural differences between the United States and China, with the humor coming from a character stuck in a culture that he does not understand. "The High Road to China" was filmed in October 1998 and Carey was the only cast member to travel to the country. The episode also marked the first time an American sitcom had ever been made in China. Filming took place at several ancient landmarks, including the Great Wall of China, the Forbidden City and the Temple of Heaven.

"The High Road to China" was seen by an estimated 11.2 million viewers, finishing inside the top 20 in the ratings for the week of November 16–22, 1998. It was the fourth-highest-rated show on ABC that week. The episode received a mixed to positive response from critics, with several naming it a highlight of the week. A Newsweek reporter thought the episode had "a bizarre plot twist", while Paul Brownfield from the Los Angeles Times called it "outlandish". Rachel Browne from The Sun-Herald thought the episode was "worth watching".

== Plot ==
After Drew plays an elaborate practical joke on his office enemy Mimi Bobeck, he gloats and says that she will not be able to better it. Mimi seeks revenge on Drew and a couple of days later, he wakes up on the Great Wall of China without his passport. Drew finds a tape recorder in his pocket and listens to a message from Mimi, who taunts him about his predicament. Drew manages to gets a ride into the nearest village, where he meets Ming, a young woman who speaks English. She offers him shelter and gets him a job selling chickens, so he can make enough money to get a bus ride to the U.S. embassy in Beijing. Meanwhile, Drew's friends Kate O'Brien, Lewis Kiniski and Oswald Lee Harvey become concerned when they learn Drew did not make it to his meeting in Winnipeg. Mimi then brags about how she had Drew drugged and placed him in a shipping crate bound for China. Kate, Lewis and Oswald struggle to come up with an idea to help Drew get back home.

Back in China, Ming agrees to drive Drew to Beijing, but he finds the embassy is closed for Thanksgiving. Drew then tries to make money by putting on a sock puppet show in the Forbidden City, but some police officers take him away to an office where he must apply for a vendor permit. Drew manages to call his friends, but is cut off before he can give them any information. After leaving the permit office, Drew meets an elderly woman who offers him a French fry from McDonald's. Drew finds the restaurant, but soon learns that he does not have enough money for food. Drew realizes that McDonald's is an international company and believes they can help him return home and asks for the manager's help. When the manager turns him down, Drew starts singing and dancing to McDonald's "You Deserve a Break Today" jingle, then breaks down crying. The manager takes pity on him and gives him the phone number of their customer service line and offers to buy him some food. Elated, Drew runs up the stairs of the Temple of Heaven, but gets winded before reaching the top and lies down on a stone carving.

== Production ==
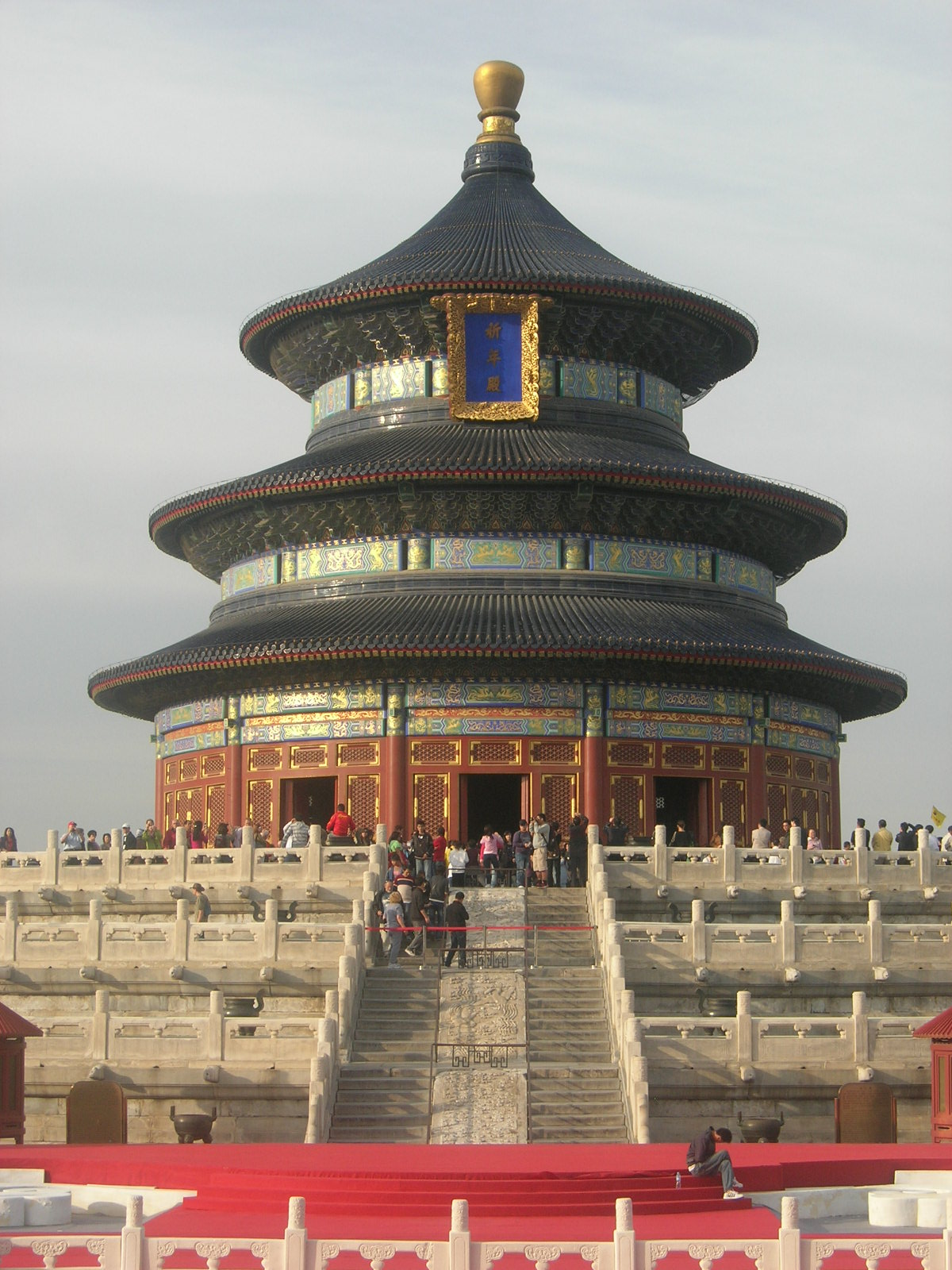
The Temple of Heaven was one of several Chinese landmarks featured in the episode.

On September 20, 1998, Paul Brownfield from the Los Angeles Times reported that Drew Carey and executive producers Deborah Oppenheimer and Clay Graham would be travelling to China during October to film scenes for an upcoming episode of The Drew Carey Show. Carey explained that the premise of the episode would poke fun at the cultural differences between the United States and China, with the humor coming from seeing his character "stuck in a culture that they don't understand", being unable to speak the language, and working out how they will get home. While thinking of "remote and outlandish" countries for Drew to wake up in, director Gerry Cohen believed China was ideal as it was far away from the United States. He said "In America we think of China as the other end of the Earth and the joke we wanted to do here was that Drew got sent as far away as possible and China seemed like the natural place." Graham believed that if the show was set in a country such as Sweden it would not have worked as well.

"The High Road to China" was scheduled to air in mid-November in a bid to capitalize on the sweeps week ratings period. It was written by Katherine Green. The plot sees Drew (Carey) stranded in China without money or his passport, as part of a practical joke executed by his office enemy Mimi Bobeck (Kathy Kinney). Carey described the joke as "the ultimate Mimi thing to do" to Drew. Carey was the only cast member to travel to China. Prior to filming, Chinese bureaucrats had to give their consent to the script, before they issued permits to shoot at landmarks within the country. The producers called the process "complex and time-consuming", but Carey was aware that the Chinese would not put up with them insulting their country and customs. "The High Road to China" marked the first time an American sitcom had ever been filmed in the country.

Carey regretted not visiting China before the script was written, as it caused problems during the filming of the village scenes in the Hubei province. As they had imagined what a Chinese village would look like, it meant that they had to redress the actual village in which they filmed. After discovering Tiananmen Square had been closed off for renovations, the crew were forced to film scenes in a side street. Other locations used during filming included the Great Wall of China and the Forbidden City. Chinese extras were also employed during the shoot. While filming the final scene of the episode, Carey laid down on a stone carving at the Temple of Heaven, causing the Chinese police to halt the shoot and issue him with a fine. Of the situation, Cohen commented "I guess the system is different. We thought, 'OK, we had a permit for this, we are ready for this, we are going to be here on a certain day at a certain time and everybody knows, right?'" The majority of the scene had already been filmed and Carey was not made to pay the fine. The finale is an imitation of Rocky Balboa's (Sylvester Stallone) run up the steps of the Philadelphia Museum of Art in Rocky.

== Reception ==
In its original broadcast, "The High Road to China" finished 15th in the ratings for the week of November 16–22, 1998, tied with the CBS program JAG. The episode had a Nielsen rating of 11.3, equivalent to approximately 11.2 million viewing households. It was the fourth highest-rated show on ABC that week, following Monday Night Football, NYPD Blue and Rear Window.

The episode received a mixed to positive response from critics. Kevin McDonough from the Charleston Daily Mail chose the episode as one of his television highlights. A reporter for The Washington Post also named "The High Road to China" as one of their television highlights for November 18, 1998. Norman Chad from the same publication compared Carey's appearance in China to the Atlanta Falcons making the Super Bowl, saying "It is a statistical and sociocultural improbability. It should not happen, cannot happen, will not happen." The Florida Times-Union's Nancy McAlister opined that sweeps week "brings out the absurd and the hyperbolic", and wrote "The Drew Carey Show takes a road trip to China for some inexplicable reason for a frothy sitcom."

Paul Brownfield from the Los Angeles Times branded the episode "outlandish", while a Newsweek writer thought it was "a bizarre plot twist". A Beaver County Times reporter observed that "Mimi's scheming against Drew reaches an all-time high" during the episode and also named it as a highlight of the day. Rachel Browne from The Sun-Herald gave the episode three out of five stars, and commented "Midwesterner Drew Carey (Drew Carey) in China? Do we smell a stunt? Well, yes, but this episode – the first American sitcom to be filmed in mainland China – is worth watching anyway."

== Lawsuit ==
A few months after the episode aired, Carey became involved in a legal battle with A&W Food Services of Canada, Inc. because his character was shown wanting to eat the food at rival restaurant chain McDonald's. Carey had signed a deal to endorse A&W in February 1998, but following the episode, in which Carey also sang a McDonald's jingle, the chain ended its deal with the actor. They also demanded he repay $450,000 and refused to pay him a further $600,000. Carey launched his own lawsuit against the company for compensation. He maintained that he did not eat at McDonald's while he was in China, instead he ate at an A&W near to his hotel.
