= Soloflex =

Type of exercise equipment

Coordinates: 45.526585°N 122.928429°W

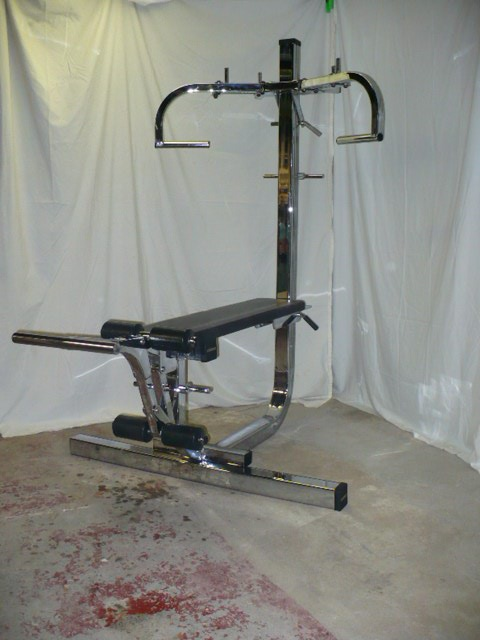
- Place of origin: United States

Production history
- Designer: Jerry Wilson
- Designed: 1978; 47 years ago
- Manufacturer: Soloflex
- Produced: 1978-April 2023

Soloflex refers to both the Soloflex exercise machine and to Soloflex, Inc., the company that created and produces it. Instead of pulleys, the Soloflex used an elastomer Weightstrap made of heavy-duty rubber to create variable resistance. The company started out as Bucksteel Mfg in Roswell, New Mexico, in a small plant on the old Army Air Force base south of town. It is now based in Hillsboro, Oregon.

== History ==
Soloflex, Inc. was established in 1978 by Jerry Wilson. The idea behind the weight straps came from Jerry's days flying small airplanes. The resistance on the plane's controls came from the bungee cord. Jerry used this idea to create the Weightstraps that provide enough resistance to equal large amounts of free weight.

In 1980, the company relocated to Hillsboro, Oregon. After the move to Oregon, Bucksteel changed its name to Soloflex. The company then used model Scott Madsen in an infomercial to promote their product. By 1984, the company's sales had grown to $18 million annually. Over time, several additions to the machine were made, such as butterfly attachments and leg extensions. The newest product addition is the Soloflex Whole Body Vibration (WBV) Platform. Vibrating while you are lifting weights is thought to magnify the conditioning effects to help promote faster muscle growth.

== Products ==
Soloflex home gym machines use an elastic element to provide resistance. The product also comes with an instructional DVD.

Soloflex's WBV Platform made news in July 2007 for a Consumer Reports review that demonstrated it had been using claims from research that may not apply to their machine. "At press time, even the research on its Website involved competitors' products and lab machines. Some research suggests that certain vibrating machines might help improve strength and balance, but our experts said it's unclear whether the Soloflex would. Its vibration levels differ from those studied."

Soloflex disputed the article's comments on burning calories, but did not comment on other claims.

As of April 29, 2023, the Soloflex website was shut down and an email sent from the company confirmed they are shutting down operations

== See also ==
- Bowflex
- NordicTrack
